= Josua Harrsch =

Josua Harrsch, also known as Joshua Kocherthal (30 July 1669 – 27 December 1719), was a German Lutheran minister who led German emigrants to New York.

== Biography ==
Joshua Harrsch was born at Fachsenfeld in Aalen, in the Ostwürttemberg region of Baden-Württemberg. He was the youngest of 23 children of Hans Jörg Harrsch (1610-1675). Educated to the ministry, he served as a Lutheran pastor at Landau in Palatinate. The Palatinate in Germany had been ravaged by the Thirty Years' War (1618 and 1648) and the subsequent Nine Years' War (1688–97). Refugees from the war, occupation by the French army and the unpopular political and religious policies of Johann Wilhelm, Elector Palatine sought a new life elsewhere. Harrsch became the leader of a group of these Palatines and traveled to London to secure permission for them to settle under the British crown. Queen Anne supported Protestantism as did her Lutheran husband, Prince George of Denmark.

The first group, which arrived in New York during 1708, consisted of 53 persons. Unjustly deprived of food, a portion of his congregation settled for a time in the Mohawk Valley. Harrsch sailed back to return with a second group, which arrived in June 1710. Although he left with 3,000 persons, 800 of them died on the way or shortly afterward while in quarantine. Many of them first were assigned to work camps along the Hudson River to work off their passage. Newly arrived Palatines were settled in the West Camp, (Saugerties) near the mouth of the Esopus Creek. Others were settled across the river in the East Camp on the east side of the Hudson River. Reverend Josua Harrsch was the Lutheran minister on both sides of the river. He died in Ulster County. Upon his death, he was succeeded by Justus Falckner, the first Lutheran minister to have been ordained in America.

== Other sources ==
- Nelson, Clifford E. (1975) Lutherans in North America (Fortress Press) ISBN 9781451407389
- Stievermann, Jan; Oliver Scheiding (2013) A Peculiar Mixture: German-Language Cultures and Identities in Eighteenth-Century North America (Penn State Press) ISBN 9780271069739
