= Johann Hartman Windecker =

- Born: before 5 November 1676; Düdelsheim, Büdingen, Hesse
- Died: Montgomery County, New York
- Occupation: Soldier
- Known for: German Palatine settler
- Spouses: Anna Catharine Birx (m. 1700; died 1710) Barbara Elisabetha Bellinger (m. 1710)
- Parent: Nicolaus Windecker

Johann Hartman Windecker (1676–1754) was a German Palatine settler and soldier who came to America in the early eighteenth century. He was the founder of the Palatine settlement Hartman's Dorf (Hartmannsdorf).

He was the son of Nicolaus Windecker and Anna Elisabeth Stroh. He married Anna Catharine Birx in 1700 in Ortenberg, Hesse and they had two children, born at Stockheim, Hesse.

Windecker immigrated to America in 1710, but his wife died during the journey. He married again in America to Barbara Elisabetha Bellinger, daughter of Nicholas Bellinger, and had at least seven more children. He was recorded as staying at Livingstone's Manor during the winter of 1710-11 and spring of 1711.

Windecker became a prominent Palatine leader. On July 5, 1711, Windecker was appointed List master of Annsbury (now Germantown). He was the leader and namesake of the Palatine settlement, Hartman's Dorf (Hartmannsdorf).

In 1711, Windecker served as a captain in an attempted invasion of Canada, the Quebec Expedition. He served under Colonel Nicholson with 300 other Palatines.

On September 21, 1731, Windecker and others were granted land in New York. On November 12, 1731, Windecker was granted 2,000 acres of land in New York in what was known as Windecker's Patent.
