= St. James Lutheran Church (Pohatcong Township, New Jersey) =

Historic church in New Jersey, United States

- St. James Lutheran Church and Cemetery
- U.S. National Register of Historic Places
- U.S. Historic district
- New Jersey Register of Historic Places
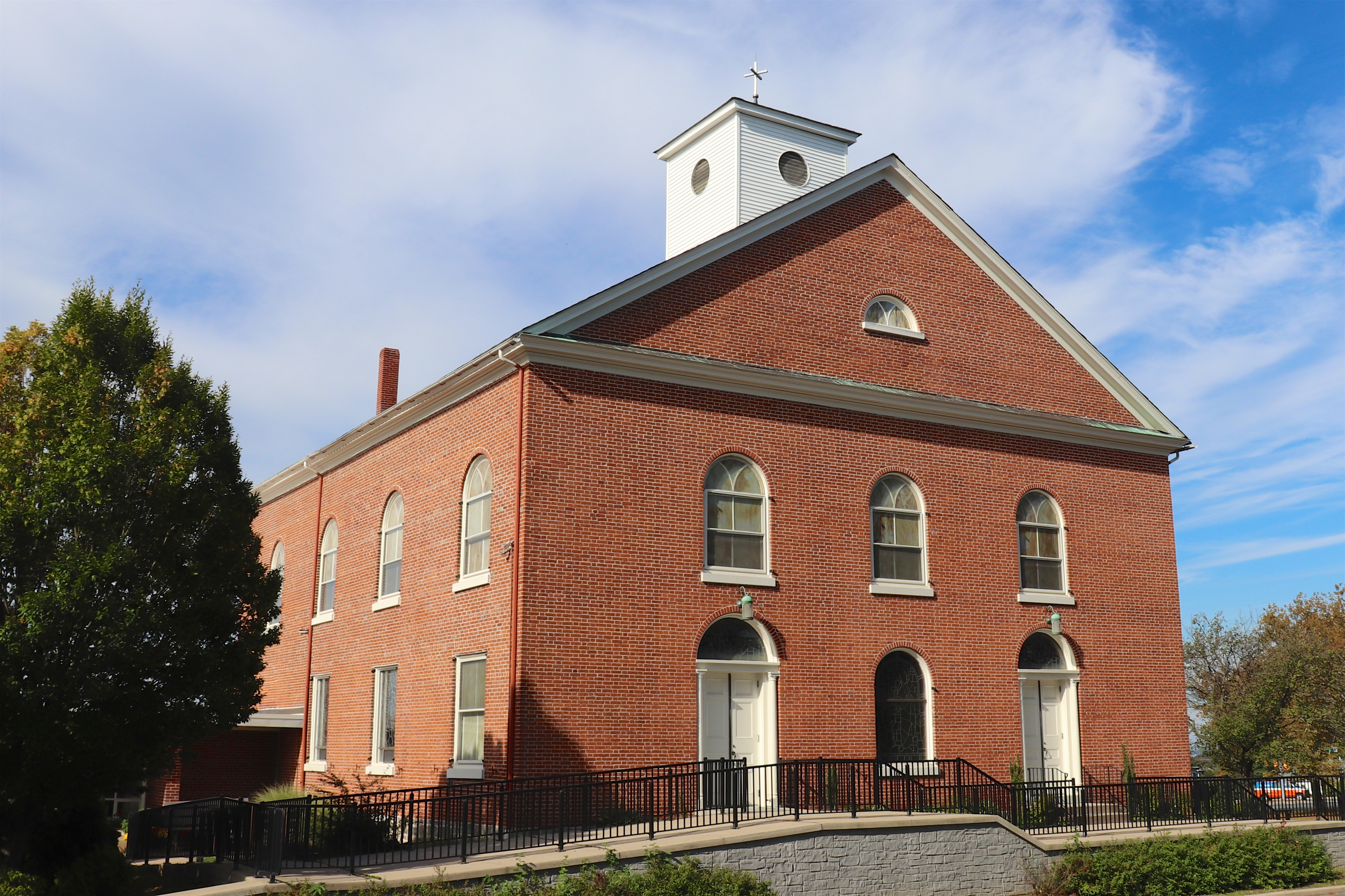
- St. James Lutheran Church in 2017

- Location within Warren County, New Jersey Location within New Jersey Location within the United States
- Location: 1213 U.S. Route 22, Pohatcong Township, New Jersey
- Coordinates: 40°40′49″N 75°8′45″W
- Area: 2.5 acres (1.0 ha)
- Architectural style: Early Republic (Federal)
- NRHP reference No.: 16000737
- NJRHP No.: 5521

Significant dates
- Added to NRHP: October 24, 2016
- Designated NJRHP: August 25, 2016

St. James Lutheran Church, also known as Straw Church, is a historic church built in 1834 and located at 1213 U.S. Route 22 in Pohatcong Township, Warren County, New Jersey. St. James Lutheran Cemetery is located across the street in Greenwich Township. The church and cemetery were added as a historic district to the National Register of Historic Places on October 24, 2016 for their significance in architecture and exploration/settlement. The adjoining building, Fellowship Hall, and the schoolhouse by the cemetery entrance are not part of this listing. The one-room brick schoolhouse, built 1858, is listed separately on the state register.

== History ==
The congregation was founded c. 1760 as a union church of German Lutheran and German Reformed Protestant settlers. By tradition, the first church was called Straw Church, a log building with a straw thatched roof, built c. 1767 in the cemetery area. Christian Streit preached here and at the nearby Lutheran church in Easton, Pennsylvania. The second church was built with stone starting in June 1790. The third church, the current building, was built with brick and has a cornerstone dated May 1, 1834.

The first regular, resident pastor, starting in 1769, was John Peter Gabriel Muhlenberg, eldest son of Henry Melchior Muhlenberg, considered the patriarch of American Lutheranism.

The cemetery is fronted by a low limestone wall with the date June 1790 engraved in a stone by the gateway. The earliest identified headstone is a brown sandstone, dated 1771, for the child David Metz. The obverse of the headstone for Peter Heintz, dated 1777, features a tree of life motif, carved by an anonymous German craftsman from Northampton County, Pennsylvania.

== Description ==
The church is a brick building designed with Federal architecture style and featuring Flemish bond on the front. The wooden cupola was added in 1960. It is the third church building at this location.

== Gallery ==
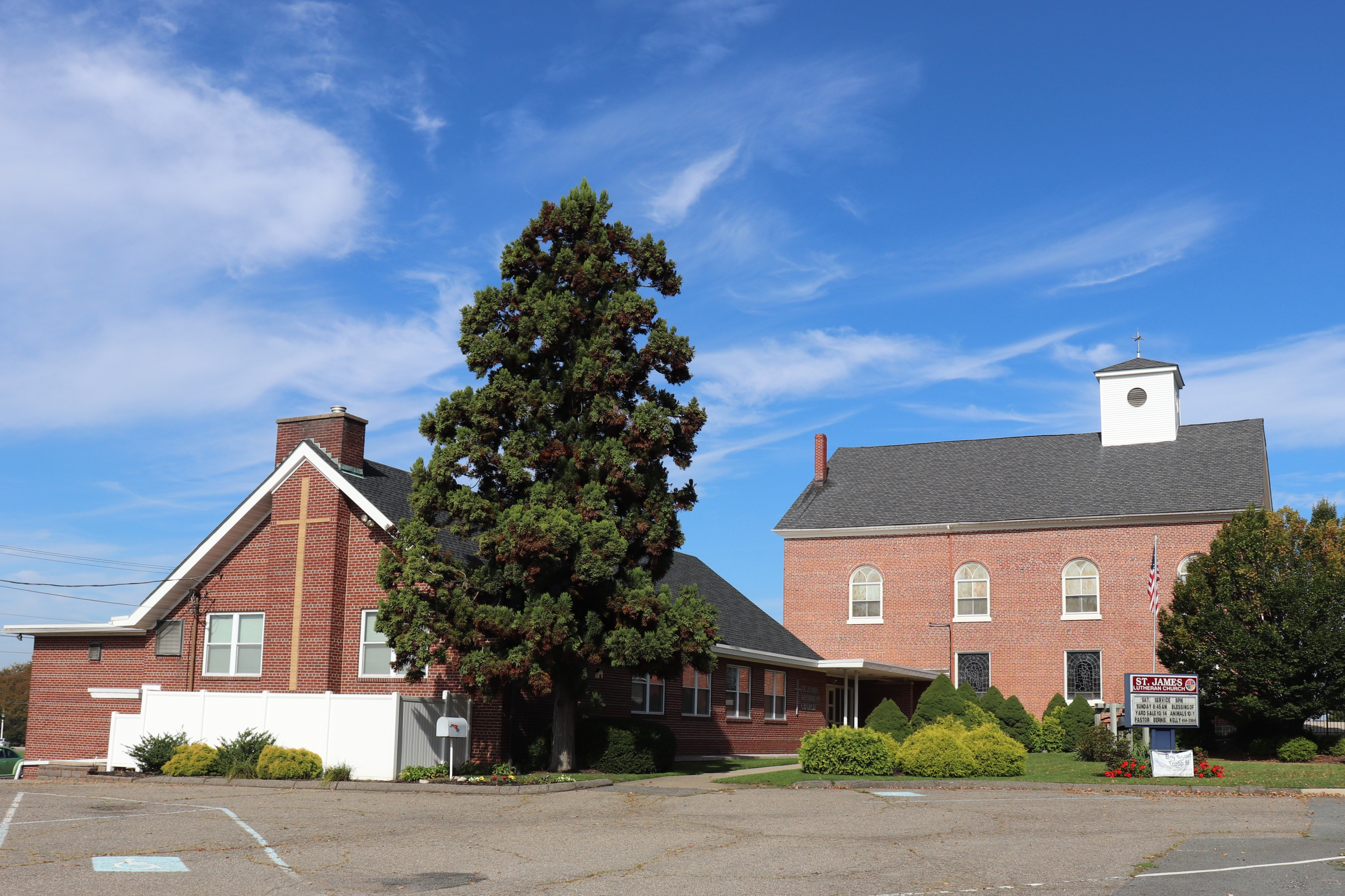
Fellowship Hall and Church

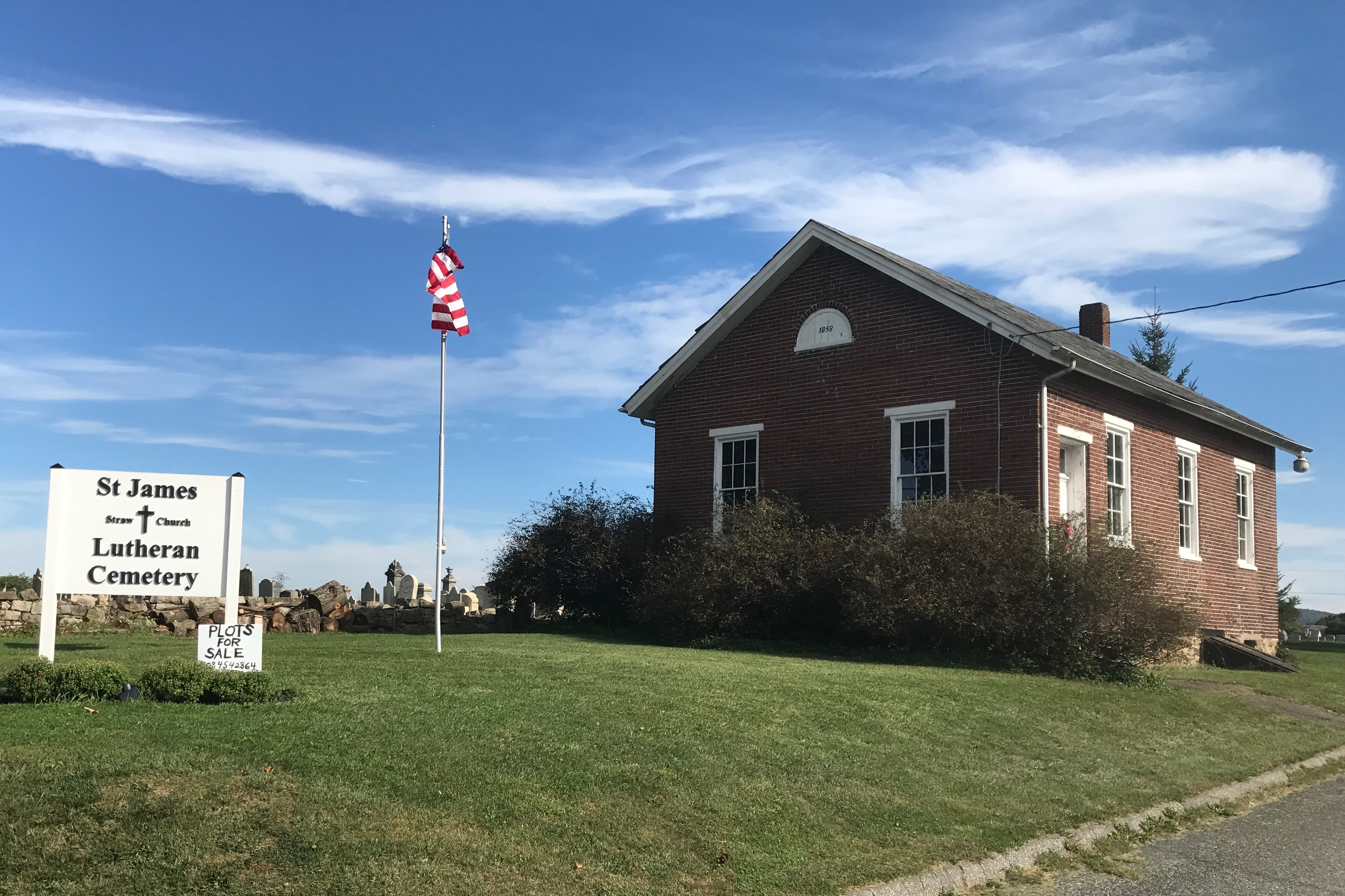
One-room schoolhouse, built 1858, by entrance to cemetery

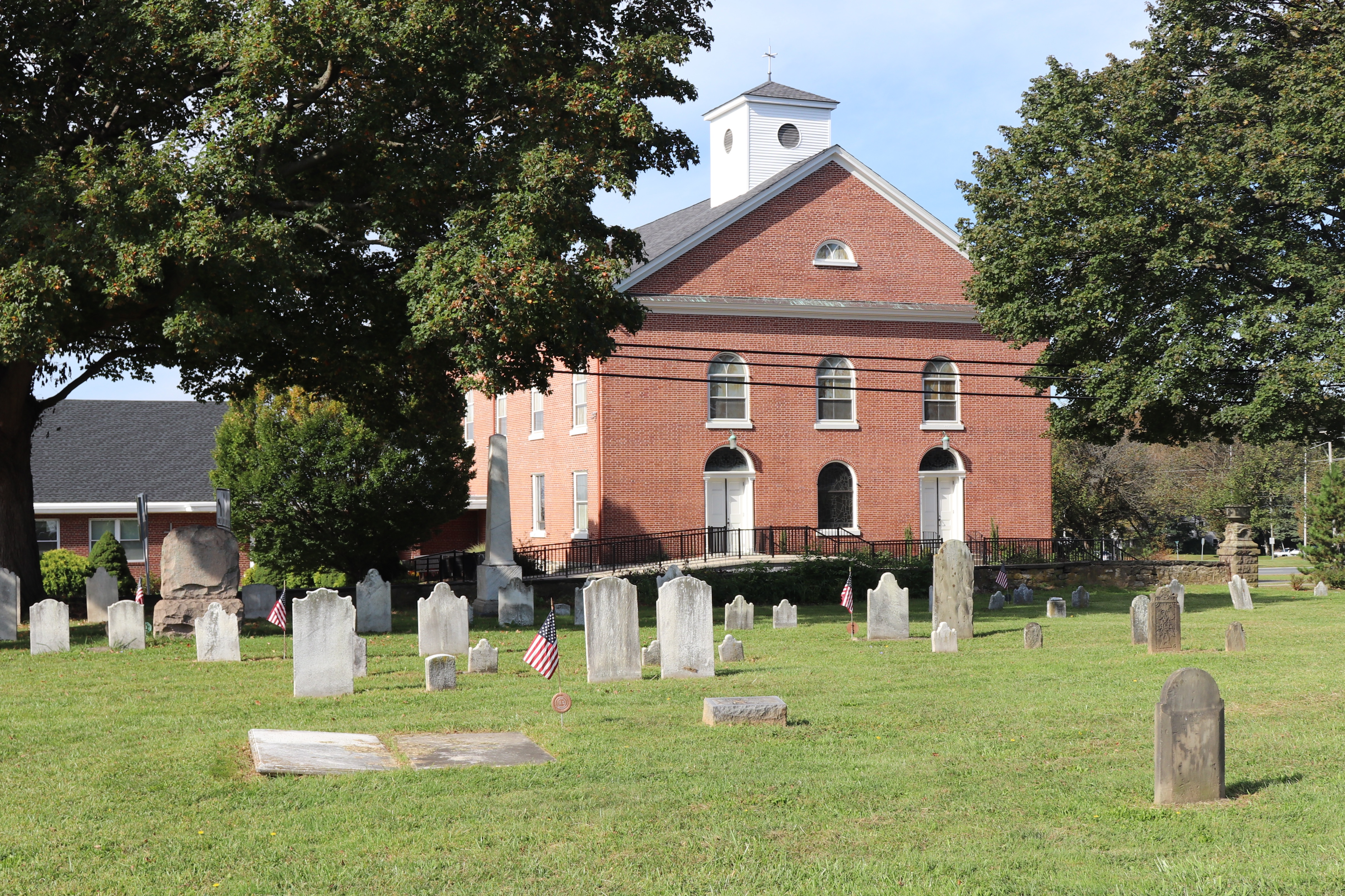
Cemetery and Church

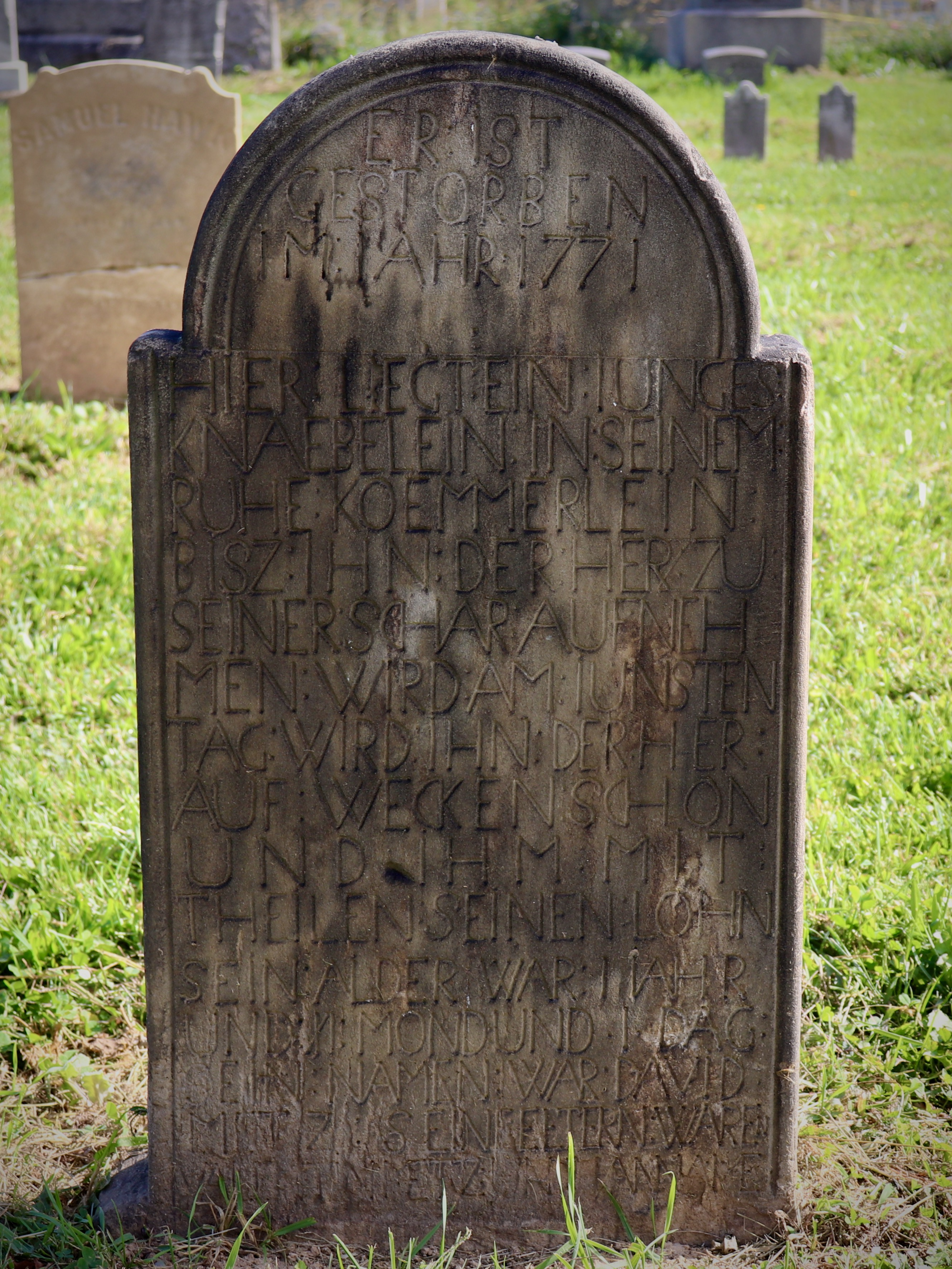
Headstone for David Metz, dated 1771

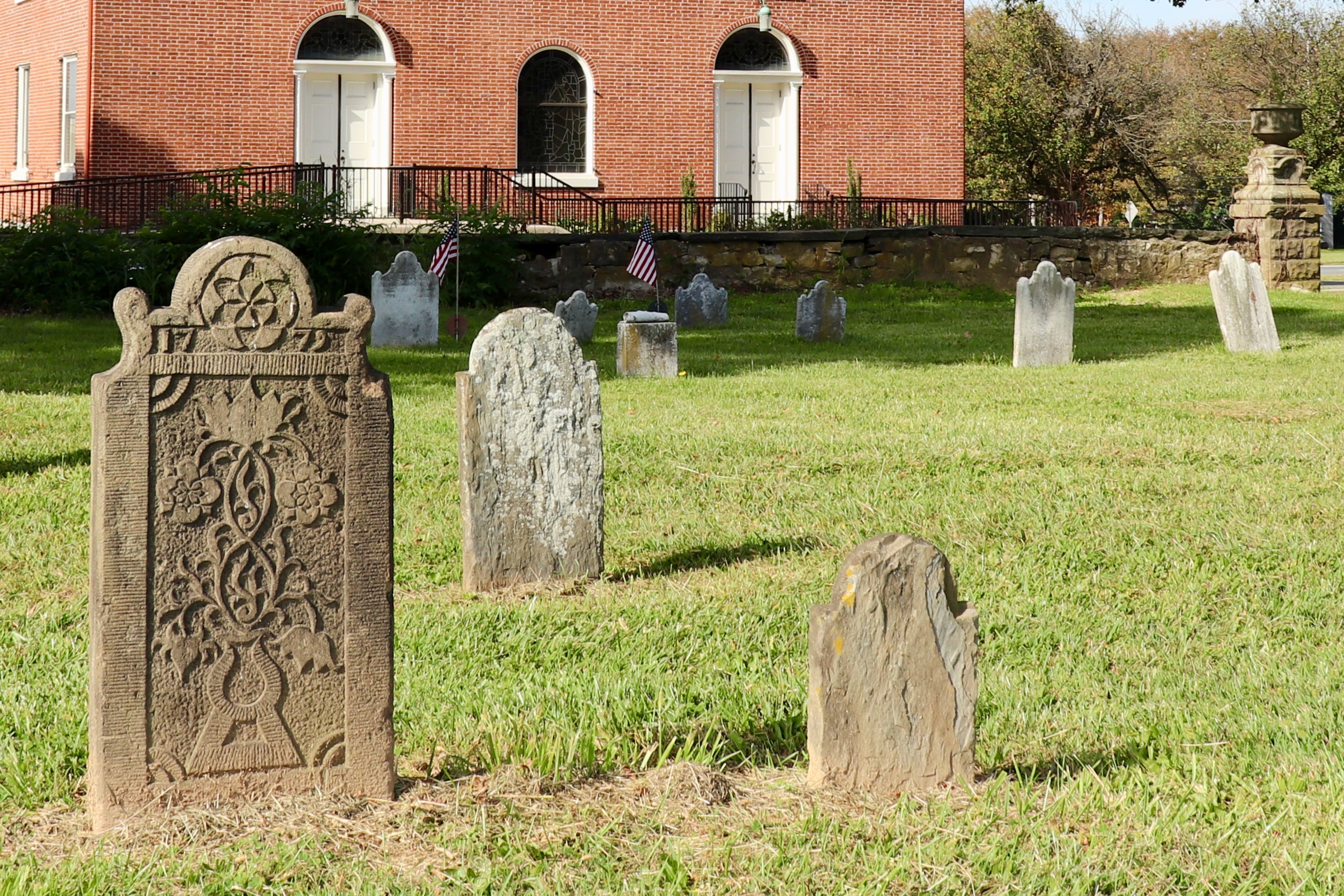
Obverse of headstone for Peter Heintz, dated 1777

== See also ==
- German Palatines
- List of Lutheran churches in the United States
