= Teskey =

Family name

Teskey is a family name that can be found in many countries of the English-speaking world. Around 80% to 90% of the Teskeys in the world today are descended from the "Irish Palatine" family of that name, founded by the man now referred to as Jacob Teskey, or Jacob 1659 (after his apparent year of birth). The term "Irish Palatine" was given to families that left the German Pfalz (also known as the Southern or Rhenish Palatinate) in 1709 and eventually settled in Ireland. Around 100 of these German-speaking families settled on the Southwell estate near Rathkeale in County Limerick. Amongst them was Jacob, with his wife and two sons.

The Teskey spelling first appeared in Ireland a few years after 1709. There has been much conjecture as to the original spelling before the family migrated to Ireland, and indeed much speculation about their specific place of origin. During their arduous and eventful migration the family was recorded as Feske in Rotterdam and Teske in London. After settling in Ireland they were recorded as Teshine in 1715, but soon afterwards the name seemed to become settled as Teskey.

In 2004 Hank Jones, a leading researcher into Irish Palatine family history, put forward a strong argument that before 1709 the family lived in a village called Osthofen, one mile from the west bank of the River Rhine and five miles north of the city of Worms. There, the 'founder' Teskey, Jacob 1659, was recorded as Jacob Tesch. This theory is based on somewhat circumstantial evidence, but all other theories have been purely conjecture.

During the great Irish migrations, especially from around 1840 until the early 20th century, several members of this Irish Palatine branch of the Teskey family emigrated to Canada, the northeastern United States, England and Australia. The migration continued later to many parts of the world. Today the greatest concentration of Teskeys is in Toronto, Ontario, Canada. However, there are still Teskeys, descendants of the first Teskey family, living and farming in the area of the original Palatine settlements near Rathkeale, Co. Limerick.

In the 19th century a branch of the family moved from Rathkeale to nearby Adare, where they were recorded as Tuskey. The Irish who migrated to North America in the 19th century included both Teskeys and the related Tuskeys. Today both spellings can be found in Canada and the USA. Research into people with the name Tuskey might conclude that they too are mostly descended from Jacob 1659 Teskey.

In addition to the major group of related Teskeys, there are other families bearing the name, mostly in Canada and the USA. These are the descendants from a number of immigrants who did not come from Ireland. They include at least two families who came directly from Germany with the name Teske and another originally called Teschke. A family from Russia was originally Tesske, whilst the families Tzrebietowski, Tyski and Tutzke came originally from Poland. A Tutefski emigrated from Romania and the origin of the Titieskey branch remains a mystery. All are known to have changed their name to Teskey either upon immigration or shortly afterwards. The largest of these non-Irish Teskey families comprises descendants of Stephen 1815 and Johanna, who came from Prussia and settled with their family in Collingwood, Ontario some time before the 1871 Census. Then their name was recorded as Teske; in the 1881 census it was Tesky; and by the 20th century it had become established as Teskey.

The wife of Canada's Prime Minister from 2006 to 2015, Stephen Harper, is Laureen Teskey. Her ancestry has been traced back to the Irish Palatine Teskeys.

The popular Australian group The Teskey Brothers includes two Teskey brothers who descend from the Irish Palatine Teskeys.

This article was submitted by Ken McDonald, whose late mother was born Doreen Teskey in England in 1914. He has researched the family since 1989, corresponded with more than 500 family members and met more than 600. He most recently reviewed the article in November 2022.
