= Justus Falckner =

American Lutheran minister (1672–1723)

Justus Falckner (November 22, 1672 – September 21, 1723) was an early American Lutheran minister and the first Lutheran pastor to be ordained within the region that became the United States. Falckner's published works include Grondlycke Onderricht, which first appeared in the Dutch language during 1708. This was the first Lutheran catechism to be published in North America. He is commemorated in the Calendar of Saints of the Lutheran Church on November 24 together with Jehu Jones and William Passavant.

== Background ==
Falckner was the fourth son of Daniel Falckner, a Lutheran pastor at Langenreinsdorf, a subdivision of Crimmitschau in Saxony. In 1693, he entered the University of Halle, where he studied theology under August Hermann Francke. He completed his studies, but determined that he was not truly prepared to follow a career in the ministry. He went to Rotterdam, where he and his brother Daniel accepted power of attorney to sell the land of William Penn in Pennsylvania.

== Career ==
In 1701, 10,000 acres (40 km^{2}) of land along the Manatawny Creek were sold to Swedish Lutheran Pastor Andreas Rudman and other Swedish settlers. After working with Pastor Rudman, Falckner reconsidered entering the ministry. He was ordained on November 24, 1703, at Gloria Dei Church, the Swedish Lutheran Church in Wicaco, today South Philadelphia. His first pastoral assignment was with the settlers on the Manatawny Creek in New Hanover Township, Pennsylvania.

On February 23, 1704, King Carl XII of Sweden issued an order formally confirming Rudman as Superintendent of the Swedish Lutheran Church in America. Shortly thereafter, Falckner was reassigned by Rudman to serve as the pastor of the Dutch Lutheran congregations in Manhattan and Albany County, New York and Hackensack, New Jersey. He learned the Dutch language and also preached in English and later in German after he succeeded Joshua Kocherthal in the ministry of German Lutheran immigrants. In 1714, Falckner led worshippers at the founding of Zion Evangelical Lutheran Church in Oldwick, New Jersey's oldest Lutheran congregation. In time he was serving fourteen congregations in the Hudson River valley.

== Personal life ==
Justus Falckner was married to Gerritje Hardick in 1717. Three children were born to the couple: Anna Catharina (1718), Sara Justa (1720), and Benedictus (1723). Justus Falckner died during 1723 in Orange County, New York.

== Other sources ==
- Sachse, Julius Friedrich (1903) Justis Falckner, Mystic and Scholar, Devout Pietist in Germany (Lancaster, PA: The New Era Printing Company)

== Related reading ==
- Williams, Kim-Eric (2003) The Journey of Justus Falckner. 1672-1723. (Delhi, New York: American Lutheran Publicity Bureau) ISBN 9781892921055
- Kessler, Martin (2003) Fundamental Instruction: Justus Falckner's Catechism. The First Lutheran Catechism Written and Published in North America A. D. 1708 (Delih, NY: American Lutheran Publicity Bureau) ISBN 9781892921048
