= Fachsenfeld =

- Borough of Aalen
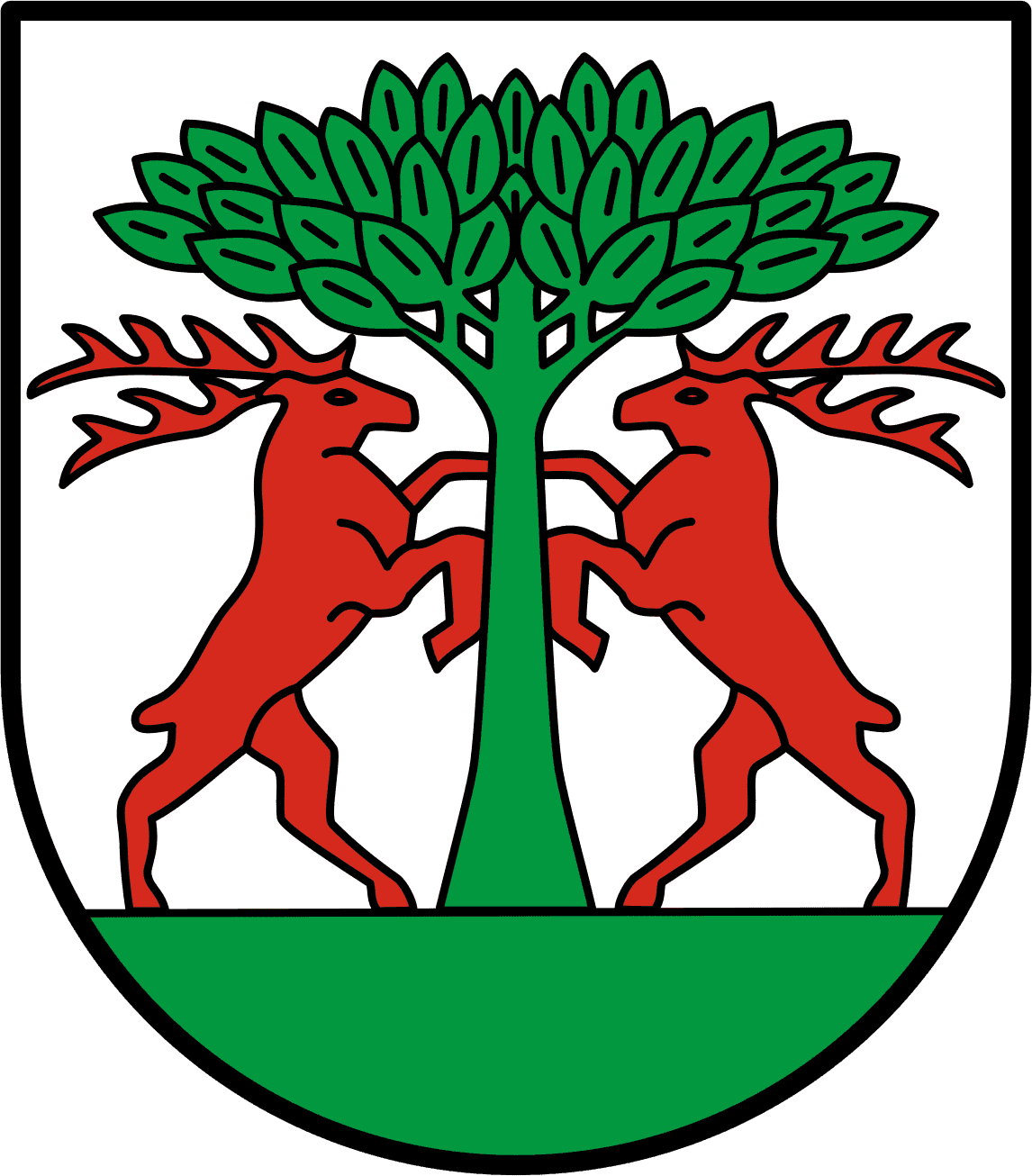
- Coat of arms

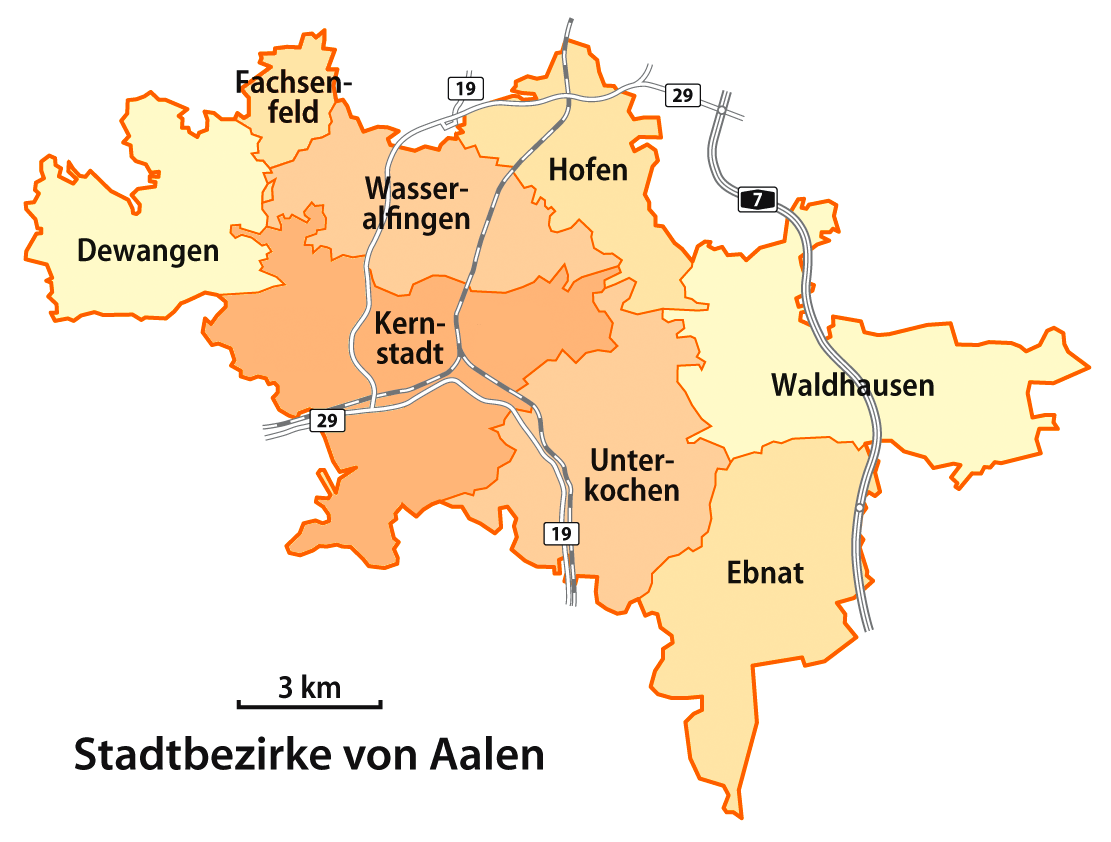
- Location of Fachsenfeld within Aalen
- Interactive map of Fachsenfeld
- Location within Germany Location within Baden-Württemberg
- Coordinates: 48°53′04″N 10°02′48″E
- Country: Germany
- State: Baden-Württemberg
- Admin. region: Stuttgart
- District: Ostalbkreis
- Town: Aalen

Government
  - Mayor: Jürgen Opferkuch

Area
  - Total: 3.949 km^{2} (1.525 sq mi)
- Elevation: 536 m (1,759 ft)

Population (2020-12-31)
  - Total: 3,569
  - Density: 903.8/km^{2} (2,341/sq mi)
- Time zone: UTC+01:00 (CET)
  - Summer (DST): UTC+02:00 (CEST)
- Postal codes: 73434
- Dialling codes: 07366
- Website: www.aalen-fachsenfeld.de

Fachsenfeld is a borough (Stadtbezirk) of the town Aalen in the German state of Baden-Württemberg.

== Geography ==
=== Location ===
From Fachsenfeld it is approximately 5 km linear-distance to the City Center of Aalen. The next districts are Dewangen (2 km) and Wasseralfingen (4 km). The Municipalities Hüttlingen and Abtsgmünd lie each 3 km apart.

== Expansion of the Fachsenfeld District ==
Fachsenfeld consists of the following parts and places

- Himmlingsweiler
- Scherrenmühle
- Schlossreute
- Spitz
- Steinfurt
- Waiblingen
- Pfannenstiel
- Kocherschafhaus
- Mühlhäusle
- Sanzenbach
- Bodenbach
- Frankeneich

== History ==
Fachsenfeld was first mentioned in a document in 1230. Originally Fachsenfeld only was a small hamlet. One part of the town was owned by knightly families, the rest belonged to the prince provost of Ellwangen. In the end of the 16th century the knights and their peasants became evangelic (Lutheran); the Evangelical church was built in 1591. The part which belonged to Ellwangen remained Catholic. In 1894 the foundation was laid for the Catholic Herz-Jesu Church, whereupon it was sanctified on September 28, 1895.

In 1972 Fachsenfeld was incorporated into Aalen.

The hamlets Himmlingsweiler and Waiblingen belong to Fachsenfeld.

Himmlingsweiler was established in the 18th century; its name was originally „Pfannenstiel“ (meaning "Panhandle"), Waiblingen located by the River Kocher, lies on the remains of a ring shaped castle stead.

== Religion ==
Approximately 65% of the people of Fachsenfeld are Catholic, 22% Evangelical and 13% belong to other religious communities or made no statements.

== Municipal administrator ==
Since July 29, 2009 Jürgen Opferkuch is the municipal administrator of Fachsenfeld.

== Music clubs ==
- Liederkranz Fachsenfeld 1855 e. V.
- Musikverein Fachsenfeld 1956 e. V.

== Sport clubs ==
- SV Germania Fachsenfeld 1912 e. V.
- Hundesportverein Aalen-Fachsenfeld e. V.
- Reit- und Fahrverein Aalen-Fachsenfeld und Umgebung e. V.
- Schützenverein Hubertus Fachsenfeld 1956 e. V.

== Transport ==
Half-hourly bus connection with the OVA (Omnibus-Verkehr Aalen) to the city center of Aalen.

== Public institutions ==
=== Library of Fachsenfeld ===
The Fachsenfeld library is the smallest of the four Aalen libraries.

=== Police ===
After the closing of the Fachsenfeld Police Outpost the Abtsgmünd Police became in charge of Fachsenfeld.

== Education ==
Reinhard-von-Koenig-Schule (elementary and secondary modern school) Fachsenfeld

After a recommendation of the local council of Aalen in 2008 the Grund- und Hauptschule Fachsenfeld became renamed in Reinhard-von-Koenig-Schule Fachsenfeld.
