= Herman II (archbishop of Cologne) =

Roman Catholic archbishop

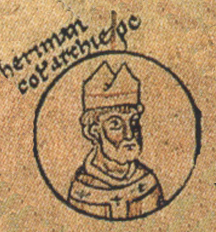
Herman II

Herman II (c. 995 – 11 February 1056), a member of the Ezzonid dynasty, was Archbishop of Cologne from 1036 until his death. According to historian Henryk Zieliński, Hermann was the most influential of the German metropolitans.

== Life ==
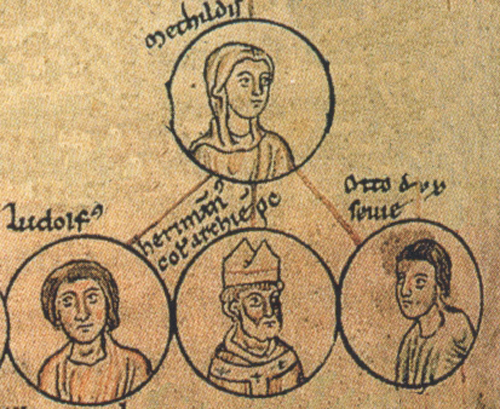
Herman with his mother Matilda and his siblings Liudolf and Otto

He was the son of the Lotharingian Count Palatine Ezzo (955–1043) and his wife Matilda of Germany, Countess Palatine of Lotharingia (979–1025), a daughter of Emperor Otto II and his consort Theophanu. He was a member of the Ezzonian dynasty. Herman's younger brother Otto became Duke of Swabia in 1045; among his sisters were Richeza, who married the Polish King Mieszko II Lambert, and Theophanu, Abbess of Essen.

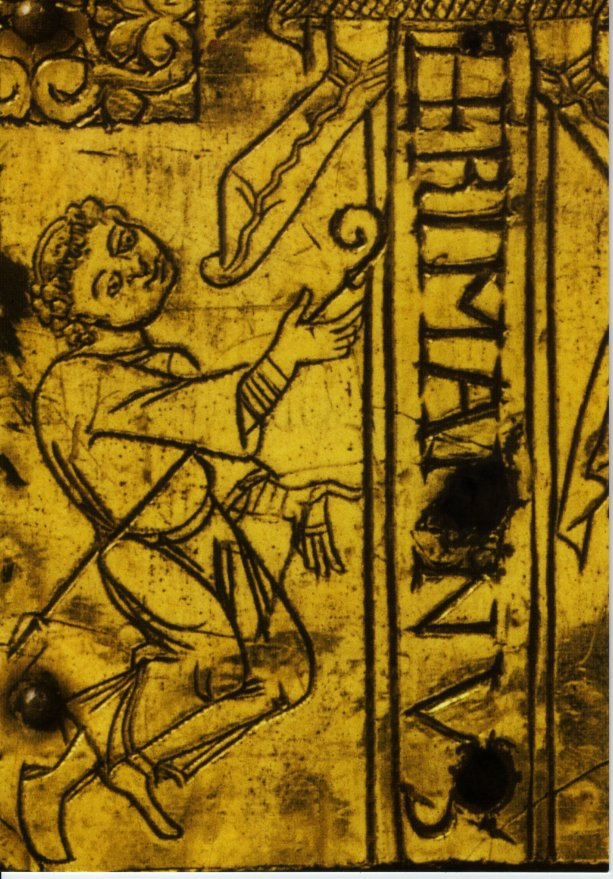
Detail from an 11th-century processional cross (Hermann-Ida-Kreuz), Kolumba museum

Pope Benedict IX elevated him to the College of Cardinals around 1036, at the same time the Salian Emperor Conrad II appointed him Archbishop and granted important privileges to the Church in Cologne. Herman accompanied Conrad on his Italian campaign and remained loyal to his successor Henry III.

In 1049 he received Pope Leo IX in Cologne and in 1051 consecrated Goslar Cathedral. His claritas generis allowed him to baptise and crown the emperor's newborn son Henry IV, a privilege that was disputed by Archbishop Luitpold I of Mainz. Herman also supported the emperor during the revolt led by Herman's nephew Duke Conrad I of Bavaria.

As Cologne archbishop he served as Archchancellor of the Italian kingdom (Regnum Italicum) and is also mentioned as protector of Brauweiler Abbey (1053). He evolved plans to rebuild Cologne Cathedral modelled on St. Peter's in Rome. He and his sister Ida had the Romanesque St. Maria im Kapitol church built from about 1040 onwards, following the example of the Basilica di Santa Maria Maggiore. He also built St. Maria ad Gradus, where his sister Richeza was initially buried. In 1050 he dedicated the collegiate Church of St. Simon and St. Jude in Goslar.

Archbishop Herman II died in Cologne and is buried in Cologne Cathedral. In the 13th century, the present-day Romanian city of Sibiu received its German name Hermannstadt in his honour.

== Literature ==
- Lewald, Ursula, 'Die Ezzonen. Das Schicksal eines rheinischen Fürstengeschlechts', in Rheinische Vierteljahrsblätter 43 (1979) pp. 120–168

Herman II (archbishop of Cologne) Ezzonids Born: c. 995 Died: 11 February 1056
Catholic Church titles
Preceded by Pilgrim	Archbishop of Cologne; 1033–1056	Succeeded by Anno II
