= Gertrude of Poland =

Gertrude
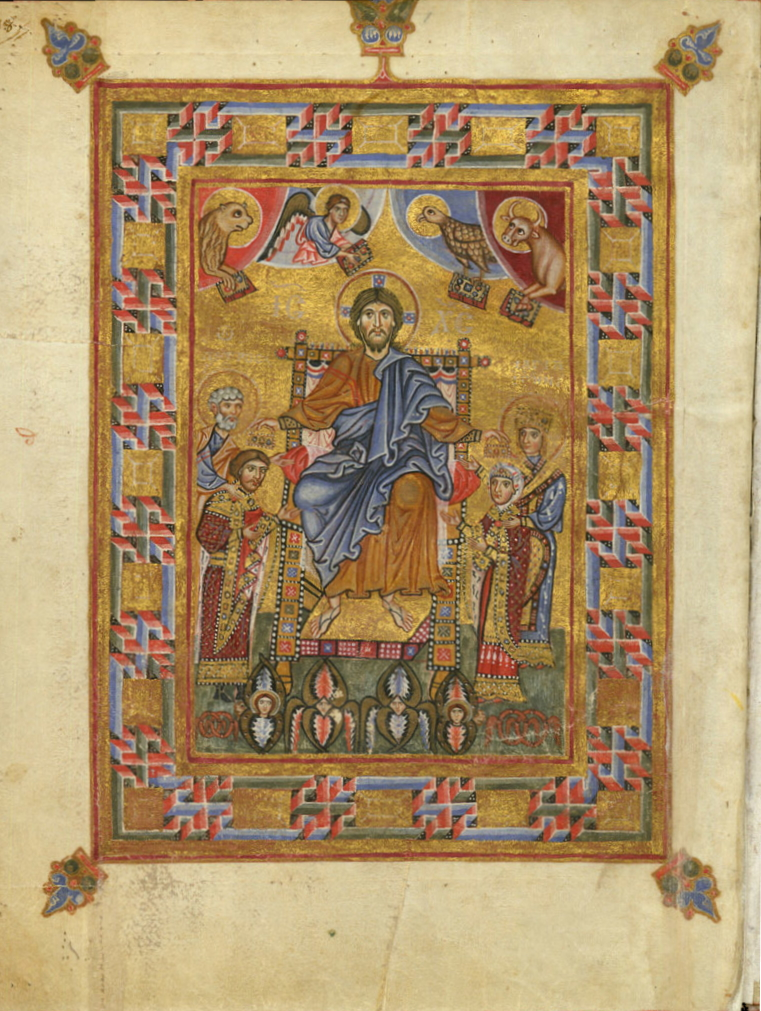
- Christ crowning Gertrude and Yaropolk, 11th-century illumination from the Trier Psalter

Grand Princess consort of Kiev
- Tenure: 1054–1073
- Born: c. 1025
- Died: 4 January 1108 (aged 82–83)
- Spouse: Iziaslav I of Kiev
- Issue: Yaropolk Izyaslavich; Mścisław Iziasławicz; Eupraxia
- House: Piast
- Father: Mieszko II Lambert
- Mother: Richeza of Lotharingia

Gertrude-Olisava (c. 1025 – 4 January 1108), was a Polish princess and the grand princess consort of Kiev by marriage to Iziaslav I. She was the daughter of Mieszko II Lambert and Richeza of Lotharingia, and the great-granddaughter of Otto II, Holy Roman Emperor.

== Early life ==
Gertrude was probably born just before or just after the royal coronation of her father Mieszko II as King of Poland, which probably took place on April 18, 1025. Her grandfather King Boleslaw II the Brave died shortly thereafter, leaving his son as the sole ruler of the Kingdom of Poland. Gertrude's mother was Richeza, the daughter of Count Palatine of Lorraine Ezzo and Matilda of Germany. Matilda was the daughter of Roman Emperor Otto II and Theophanu of the Macedonian dynasty ruling Byzantium. Through these colligations, Gertrude was related to the most important families of Europe at the time.

Gertrude probably grew up in the royal residence in Gniezno, along with her siblings, about a decade older: brother Casimir and a sister unknown by name. Two languages were probably spoken at court: Polish and German, while Latin was the language of liturgy and learning, taught at the cathedral school, where members of the royal family also studied.

Soon the reign of Mieszko II began to plunge into crisis. The conflict with Emperor Conrad II was exploited by Grand Prince of Kiev Yaroslav the Wise, who invaded Poland from the east. The situation was exploited by the ousted royal brothers raising a revolt. The king had to flee to Bohemia, where, however, he was captured and probably castrated. Power in Poland was assumed by his brother Bezprym, who gave up the royal crown. The royal insignia was taken out of Poland and given to Emperor Conrad II Richeza, who left Poland with her children.

Gertrude received her education at one of the German Benedictine monasteries, whose abbesses were many of the sisters of Richeza. At that time Mieszko II reassumed power in Poland, but Richeza did not join him. She was, however, interested in the succession of her son Casimir. When Mieszko II died Casimir attempted to take power in Poland shortly thereafter, but had to flee to Hungary. In 1039 he made another attempt, supported by the Emperor, this time successful. He made his capital in Kraków (Gniezno was destroyed by the Czechs in 1038).

== Grand princess consort ==
In 1043, Gertrude married Iziaslav I of Kiev, a son of Yaroslav the Wise.

She had two sons, Yaropolk Iziaslavich and Mstislav, and a daughter, Eupraxia, who later married the Prince of Kraków, Mieszko Bolesławowic of the Piast dynasty. Often acknowledged as her son, Sviatopolk II of Kiev may have been a son of Iziaslav and a concubine.

On 15 September 1068, Iziaslav suffered a defeat and both she and her husband were expelled from Kiev and settled in Poland. It was then that Gertrude inherited a medieval illuminated manuscript, known as the Egbert Psalter or Trier Psalter, which had been created in the late 10th century for archbishop Egbert of Trier. She included her prayer book as part of the codex. In the prayer book she prays six times for Yaropolk, unicus filius meus (translated as either "my favourite son" or "my only son").

On 2 May 1069, Bolesław II the Generous, Gertrude's nephew, helped Iziaslav regain control of Kiev. Though on 22 March 1073, the princely couple with their children had to flee to Poland again. This time Bolesław had sided with the Ruthenian opposition, and forced the family to leave for Germany. However, he himself was forced by the pope to reconcile with the couple, which was to be a condition for granting him the royal crown. On 25 December 1076, Gertrude and her husband took part in the coronation of Bolesław in Gniezno .

On 15 July 1077, the couple settled, once again, in Kiev.

== Later life ==
After her husband's death in 1078, Gertrude stayed at the court of the youngest son of Yaropolk, the prince of Turov and Volhynia. In 1084, she became a hostage of Vladimir II Monomakh, who had captured Lutsk, where she had taken refuge, abandoned by her son.

She died on 4 January 1108. The place of her burial is unknown.

== Bibliography ==
- Michałowska, Teresa (2001). Ego Gertruda. Studium historycznoliterackie [Ego Gertruda. A historical and literary study] (in Polish). Warsaw: PWN.

Gertrude of Poland Piast Dynasty Born: ~1025 Died: 1108
New title	Princess Consort of Turov; 1045–1078	Succeeded by Kunigunde
Preceded by Irina	Grand Princess Consort of Kiev; 1054–1073	Succeeded by Cecilia
