= Otto II of Swabia =

German aristocrat (c. 995 – 1047)

Otto II
- Duke of Swabia
- Reign: 1045–1047
- Predecessor: Henry I
- Successor: Otto III
- Born: c. 995
- Died: 7 September 1047
- Buried: Brauweiler Abbey, Cologne
- Noble family: Ezzonids
- Spouse: a daughter of Hugh IV, Count of Eguisheim
- Father: Ezzo, Count Palatine of Lotharingia
- Mother: Matilda of Germany

Otto II (c. 995 – 7 September 1047), a member of the Ezzonid dynasty, was Count Palatine of Lotharingia from 1034 until 1045 and Duke of Swabia from 1045 until his death.

== Life ==
Otto was the son of the Lotharingian count palatine Ezzo (955–1034) and his wife Matilda (979–1025), a daughter of Emperor Otto II and his consort Theophanu. He was a member of the Ezzonian dynasty. Otto's elder brother Herman became Archbishop of Cologne in 1036; his sister Richeza married the Polish king Mieszko II Lambert in 1013.

Upon the death of his father in 1034, Otto succeeded him as count palatine as well as count in Deutz and in the Rhenish Auelgau, as his elder brother Liudolf had died already in 1031. He also served as protector (Vogt) of Brauweiler Abbey near Cologne, which had been founded by his parents.

In the conflict with Duke Godfrey III of Lower Lorraine, Otto remained a loyal supporter of the Salian king Henry III. In turn Henry vested him with the princeless Duchy of Swabia, which he had seized upon the early death of Duke Herman IV. At Easter on 7 April 1045 in Goslar, the ducal title was awarded to Otto; in exchange, he gave up the office of count palatine, which was bestowed on his cousin Henry I. Also, his territories in Kaiserswerth and Duisburg devolved onto the crown.

== Marriage and children ==
Otto married a daughter of Count Hugh IV of Nordgau. He had a daughter, Richenza (c. 1025 – 1083), who married, firstly, Herman, Count of Werl, and, secondly, Otto of Nordheim. Another daughter, Hildegard of Egisheim, married Frederick of Büren, and they were the parents of Duke Frederick I of Swabia. Recently, any matrimonial alliance of Otto has been disputed.

On 7 September 1047, Otto died unexpectedly at his castle, the Tomburg, while preparing an imperial campaign against the invading forces of Count Baldwin V of Flanders and Count Dirk IV of Holland. He was buried in Brauweiler Abbey; the ceremony was held by his brother-in-law, Bishop Bruno of Toul, the later Pope Leo IX. In 1048, Emperor Henry III appointed Otto of Schweinfurt his successor as Duke of Swabia.

== Sources ==
- Commire, Anne; Klezmer, Deborah, eds. (2000). Women in World History: A Biographical Encyclopedia. Yorkin Publications.
- Robinson, I. S. (1999). Henry IV of Germany 1056-1106. Cambridge University Press.
- Robinson, I.S. (2008). Eleventh-century Germany: The Swabian chronicles. Manchester University Press.
- Robinson, I.S. (2015). The annals of Lampert of Hersfeld. Manchester University Press.
- Wilson, Peter H. (2016). Heart of Europe. Harvard University Press.

Otto II of Swabia Ezzonids Died: 1047
Preceded by Ezzo	Count Palatine of Lotharingia; 1034–1045	Succeeded by Henry I
Preceded by Henry I	Duke of Swabia; 1045–1047	Succeeded by Otto III
