= Tomburg Castle =

Tomburg
- Rheinbach-Wormersdorf
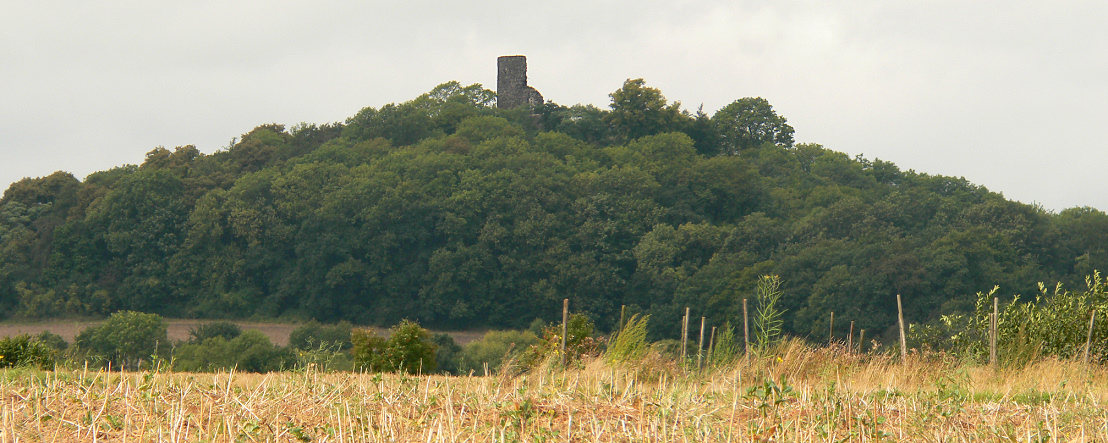
- Ruins of the Tomburg on the hill of Tomberg

Site information
- Type: Hill castle
- Code: DE-NW
- Condition: The well and remains of the keep are still present

Location
- Coordinates: 50°35′44.9″N 6°58′25.49″E
- Height: 316 m above sea level (NN)

Site history
- Built: c. 900

Garrison information
- Occupants: Noblemen, counts, robber barons

The Tomburg is a castle ruin near Wormersdorf, a village in the municipality of Rheinbach near the German city of Bonn. It is located in a small nature reserve that contains a number of rare plant species, on the 316 m above sea level (NN) high Tomberg hill. The Tomberg is a relic of the Tertiary. Liquid lava rose up in a volcano; erosion has since removed the outer layers and left a basalt dome.

== History ==
The earliest traces of settlement on the Tomberg date to the 4th century and point to its use by the Romans. The hill castle was constructed around the year 900 and was expanded in later centuries.

Around 1000, Count Palatine Ezzo of Lotharingia and his wife Matilda, a sister of Emperor Otto III, resided at the Tomburg. Their daughter Richeza became Queen of Poland. Her brother Otto inherited the Palatinate. He became Duke of Swabia in 1045 and died at the Tomburg in 1047. Ownership changed to the Duke of Cleves in 1090 and to the Lords of Müllenark in 1230. From that point onwards, they called themselves von Tomburg.

After a turbulent history, the castle lost its military importance beginning from the 14th century, due to the introduction of black powder in the artillery. It was still used as a fall-back position by the von Tomburgs who by that time acted as mere robber barons, like many former noble families during the decline of the Middle Ages. After an inheritance division in 1420, the castle had several owners. It was conquered by Duke Gerhard VII of Jülich after a fight with Frederick of Tomburg and Landskron. It was almost totally destroyed by shellfire on 7 September 1473 and never rebuilt.

== Current situation ==
Until modern times, the castle ruins and Tomberg hill were used as a basalt quarry. Nevertheless, about 70% of the hill and some elements of the castle's bergfried have been preserved. The 46-metre-deep castle well still exists; it was excavated in 1883 by a local society. Many archeological finds were made, such as stone cannonballs.

A stylized Tomberg is depicted on the packaging of the sugar beet syrup produced by a factory in nearby Meckenheim. A Bundeswehr barracks in Rheinbach was named after the Tomburg, as was a local secondary school.
