= Henry I, Count Palatine of Lotharingia =

Henry I (German: Heinrich; d.1061), was Count Palatine of Lotharingia from 1045 until 1060. He was the son of Hezzelin I, Count in Zülpichgau, and a member of the Ezzonid dynasty. Historians have given several nicknames to Heinrich: Furiosus (the Violent/the Insane), because he murdered his wife, and Monachus (the Monk), because he was confined into an abbey to treat his insanity.

== Life ==
Henry was the son of Hezzelin I and his wife, whose name is unknown and who was probably a daughter of Conrad I of Carinthia.

Around 1048 Henry married Mathilda of Verdun (born abt 1025, died 27 July 1060), daughter of Duke Gozelo of Lotharingia, and sister of pope Stephen IX.

He received the Mosellan castle of Cochem from his cousin, Queen Richeza of Poland. He was elected as successor for the German kingdom during Emperor Henry III's illness.

Shortly after 1058, Henry began to show signs of insanity, for which he was confined to the abbey of Gorze. He escaped however, and thinking that his wife Matilda had been unfaithful to him, he killed her (27 July 1060). Henry then was definitely enclosed into the abbey of Echternach, where he died in 1061. His office and counties were confiscated by Anno II, archbishop of Cologne, who became the guardian of their only son, the later count palatine Hermann II (1064-1085).

Preceded by Otto I	Count Palatine of Lotharingia; 1045–1060	Succeeded by Hermann II
