= Conrad I of Bavaria =

Conrad I (c. 1020 – 5 December 1055), also known as Cuno or Kuno, was the duke of Bavaria from 1049 to 1053. He was of the Ezzonen family, his parents being Liudolf, Count of Zütphen and eldest son of Ezzo, Count Palatine of Lorraine, and Matilda. For this, he is sometimes called Conrad of Zutphen.

After eighteen months of vacancy since the death of Henry VII, the duchy of Bavaria was filled on 2 February 1049 by the Emperor Henry III with Cuno. Cuno was the possible successor of the childless emperor. He was not the choice of the Bavarian nobility, but was intended to draw the duchy closer to the crown. This failed, for Cuno married against the will of the emperor when he wed Judith of Schweinfurt, daughter of Otto III, Duke of Swabia. He tried to increase his power in Bavaria and was in conflict with Gebhard III, Bishop of Regensburg. Finally, he was summoned to a Christmas court at Merseburg in 1052–1053 and there deposed. He was replaced early the next year by Henry's unexpectedly newborn son, later the Emperor Henry IV. Cuno, who had not come to blows with the bishop, returned to Bavaria and rebelled. He was in league with the rebellious Welf of Carinthia and Andrew I of Hungary. He died in exile after trying to assassinate the Emperor and seize the throne, having been abandoned by Welf, in 1055. He was buried in St Mariengraden in Cologne in 1063.

His enumeration is a little confused. He is sometimes not considered a Conrad, thus Conrad II is numbered Conrad I.

== Sources ==
- Lyon, Jonathan R., ed. (2017). Noble society: Five lives from twelfth-century Germany. Manchester University Press.

Conrad I of Bavaria Ezzonen Born: c. 1020 Died: 1055
Preceded by Henry VII	Duke of Bavaria; 1049–1053	Succeeded by Henry VIII
