= Erenfried II =

- Died: c. 970
- Noble family: Ezzonids
- Spouse: Richwara of Zülpichgau
- Issue: Herman I, Count Palatine of Lotharingia; Erenfried
- Father: Eberhard I, Count of Bonngau

Erenfried II (died c. 970) was a Lotharingian nobleman, from the Rhineland area in what is now Germany. His existence is based on the assumption that several records of a person with this name all represent the same person.

According to one proposal, he was a son of an earlier count name Eberhard, who held comital jurisdiction near Bonn, and Zülpich. He could otherwise be the same as Ehrenfrid, son of Ricfrid, from the northern Rhineland.

One or more people of this name are known from tenth-century records, holding comital status in the Keldachgau, Zülpichgau (942), Bonngau (945), and in Hubbelrath (950).

Possibly he was also the count of this name in the Hattuariergau (947) and in the neighbouring Tubalgau (Duffelgau) (948), further north.

In this period there was also count of this name in the Belgian county of Huy, who was possibly also Vogt of Stavelot Abbey.

It is proposed that he married Richwara (died 10 July 963) and had issue:

- Hermann I, Count Palatine of Lotharingia. Although there is record of Hermann's mother being Richwara, the proposal concerning who his father was is likely but not certain.
- Erenfried, Abbot of Gorze (same as Poppo II Bishop of Würzburg (961-983)?) (fl. 999).

== See also ==
- Duchy of Berg
- Ezzonids
