= St. Maria ad Gradus =

Coordinates: 50°56′28″N 6°57′36″E

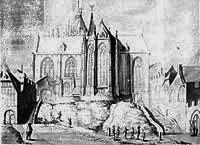
Drawing by Johannes Vinkenboom, 1660

St. Maria ad Gradus ("Our Lady of the Steps", also colloquially called Mariengraden in German language) is the name of a former church located East of the Cathedral of Cologne, Germany, situated between the cathedral and the Rhine.

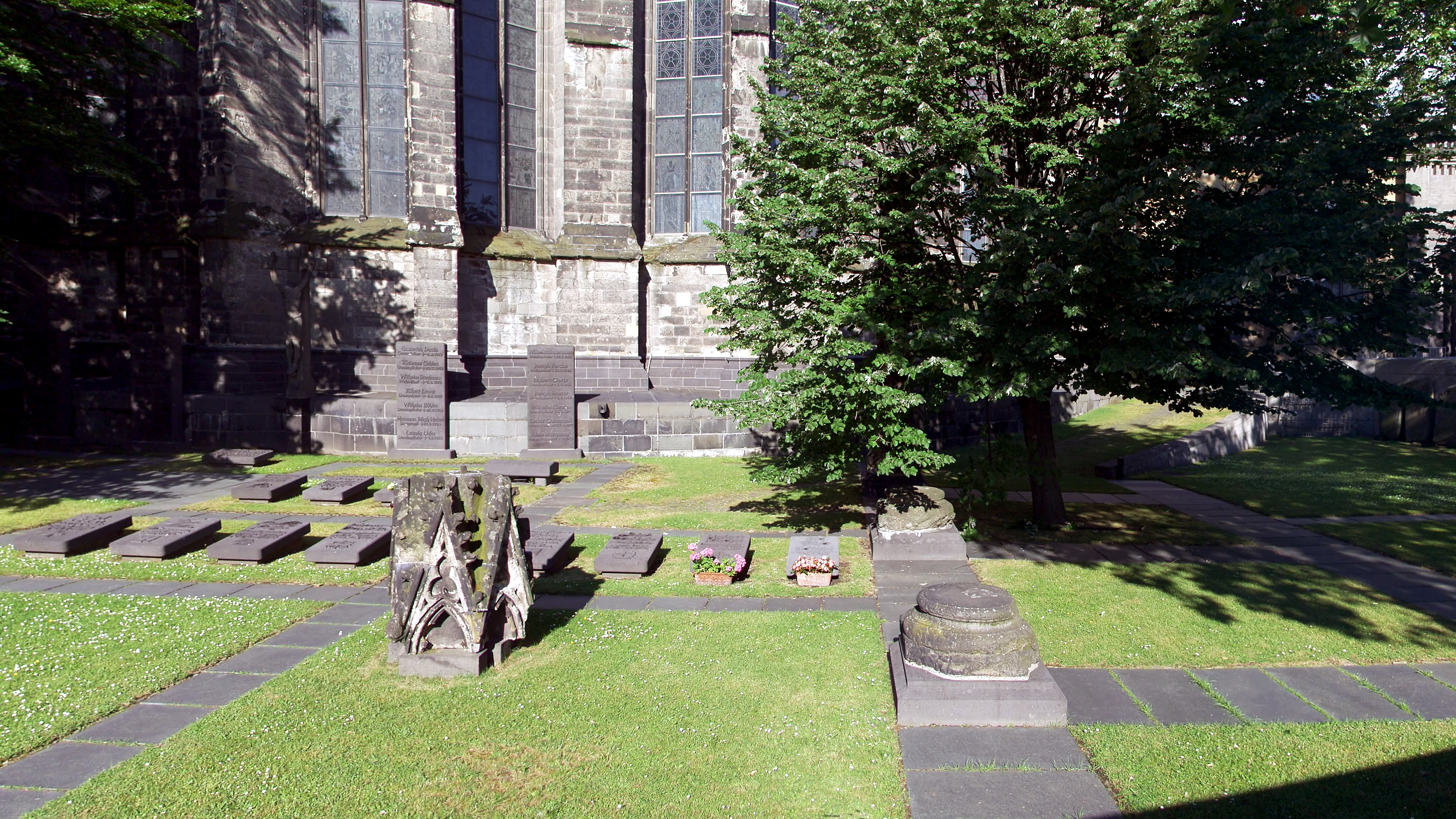
The site of the church, with the east end of the cathedral in the background

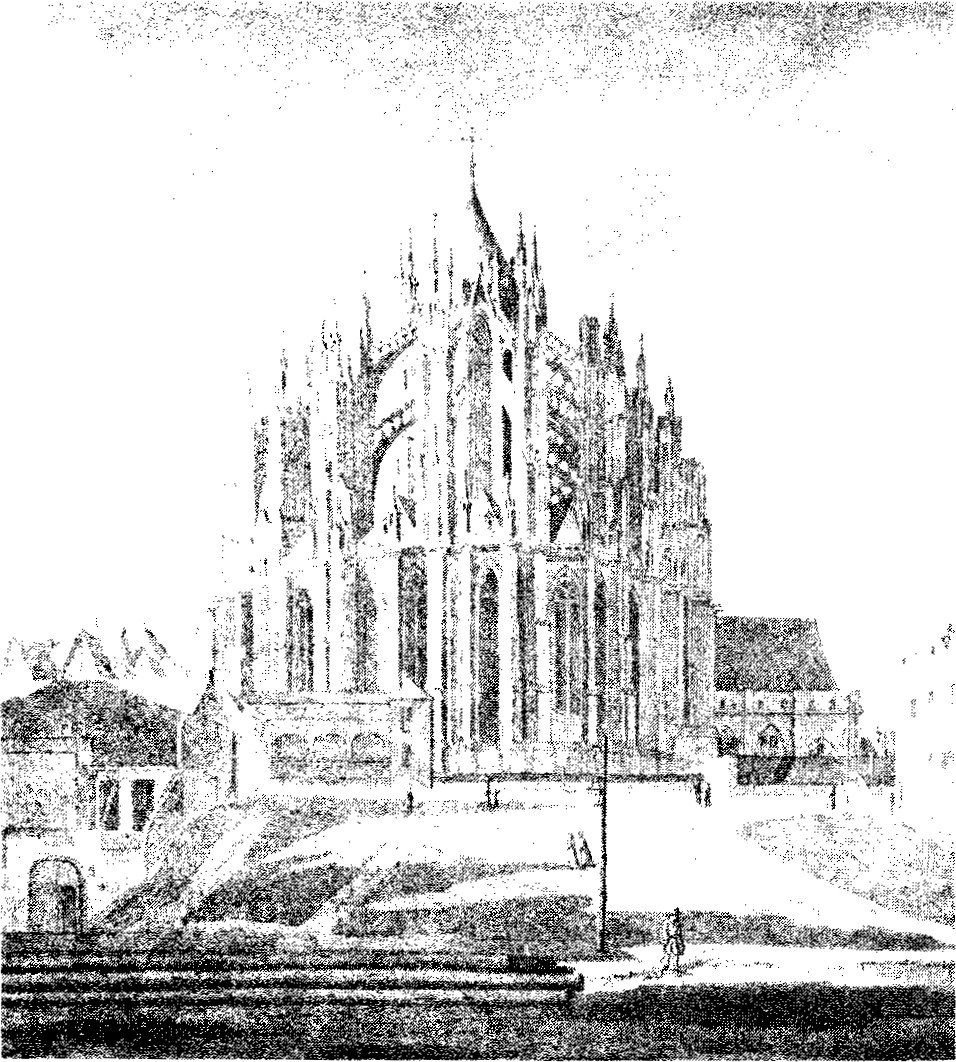
The remains of the church, with the cathedral in the background, before 1825

Founded by Herman II, Archbishop of Cologne, the church was the burial site of blessed Richeza of Lotharingia (died March 1063), a former Queen of Poland and a grandchild of Otto II, Holy Roman Emperor and his wife Theophanu. The Romanesque building, 55m long and 42m wide, was probably completed by Archbishop Anno II in 1075, when the relics of St. Agilulfus of Cologne (died 750) were transferred there. St Mary's functioned as a ceremonial reception church. In 1080 it burned down, but was rebuilt in 1085 and later expanded. Also on the premises was the separate Afrakapelle, a chapel dedicated to Saint Afra.

The remains of Richeza and others were later translated to the cathedral, which had been begun in 1248. Konrad von Hochstaden was canon of St. Maria ad Gradus and Archbishop of Cologne at this time, from 1238 to 1261.

Following the French occupation of the Rhineland in 1794, monasteries and religious foundations were dissolved, and churches abandoned. Most of the members left the monastery, which was dissolved in 1802.

As St. Maria ad Gradus was too close to other churches (the cathedral, Great St. Martin's, and St. Andreas), it was partially demolished in 1817; and most of what remained was removed in 1827 when the area was cleared to allow the cathedral's restoration and completion. Only a few fragments remain. After excavations at the cathedral in 1866, finds related to St. Mariengraden were sent to various museums.

== Other burials ==
- Conrad I, Duke of Bavaria
- Agilulfus of Cologne
