= Ezzonids =

Dynasty of Lotharingian stock

Ezzonids Ezzonens
- Country: Holy Roman Empire
- Founded: Ninth Century
- Founder: Erenfried I
- Titles: Imperial Count
- Estates: Count Palatine of Lotharingia, County of Berg, Altena, Isenberg, County of Limburg, Gemen, Styrum, Wisch, Bronkhorst and Borculo, Oberstein, County of Limburg, Broich, etc.
- Cadet branches: Berg, House of La Marck, House of Limburg-Stirum

The Ezzonids (German: Ezzonen, French: Ezzonides) were a dynasty of Lotharingian stock dating back as far as the ninth century. They attained prominence only in the eleventh century, through marriage with the Ottonian dynasty of Holy Roman Emperors. Named after Ezzo, Count Palatine of Lotharingia from 1015 to 1034, they dominated the politics of the middle and lower Rhine and usually represented the royal interests. Under the Salian Emperors, they even briefly held the dukedoms of Swabia, Carinthia, and Bavaria.

== History ==
The Ezzonids first appear with Erenfried I (866–904), count of the Bliesgau, Keldachgau, and Bonngau, and perhaps also of the Charmois. He may have had Carolingian ancestors, although some historians prefer to link him to the former Thuringian kings. The political ascent of the Ezzonid dynasty becomes historically visible with the number of counties they acquired in the second half of the tenth century. They ruled most of the Rhenish counties and were eventually granted Palatine status over the other counts of the district. In spite of their military accomplishments in the service of the Emperors, the Ezzonids did not succeed in building a territorial entity in Lotharingia.

The cadet branch of the Ezzonids was the House of Berg who ruled as Counts of Berg. Adolf I, Count of the Mark belonged to a collateral line of the counts of Berg and was founder of the new noble House of La Marck branch of the Counts de la Mark.

Another cadet branch of the Ezzonids is the House of Limburg-Stirum. The family adopted its name in the 12th century from the immediate county of Limburg an der Lenne in what is now Germany. It is the eldest and only surviving branch of the House of Berg, which was among the most powerful dynasties in the region of the lower Rhine during the Middle Ages.

== Counts Palatine of Lotharingia ==
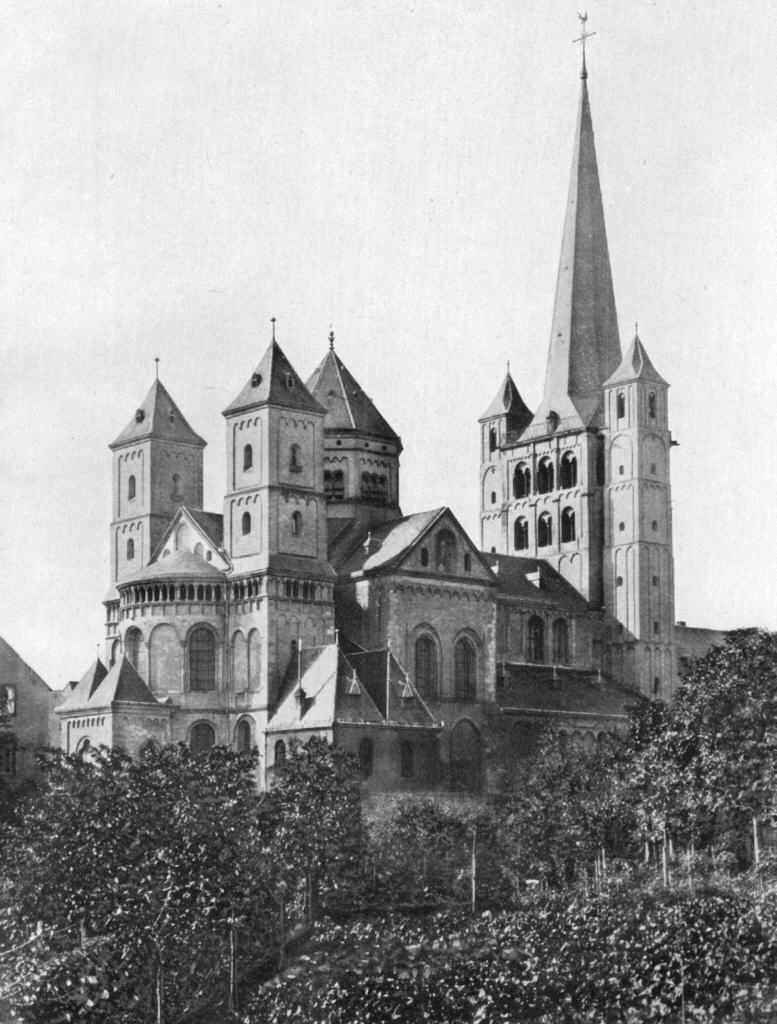
The Abbey of Brauweiler was founded by Ezzo, Count Palatine of Lotharingia.

- Hermann I, Count Palatine of Lotharingia.
- Ezzo, Count Palatine of Lotharingia (1015–1034) was one of the most important figures of the Rhenish history of his time. According to the Brauweiler chronicle, he failed to succeed to the monarchy after the death of emperor Otto III (983–1002) in a rivalry with duke Henry II of Bavaria (1002–1024). The succession war between Ezzo and Henry II continued for over ten years. The two men came to an agreement after a battle at Odernheim in 1011. Kaiserswerth, Duisburg and the surrounding imperial territories were granted as a fief to Ezzo for renouncing the throne (after 1016).
- Otto I, Count Palatine of Lotharingia (1035–1045) and Duke of Swabia (1045–1047). In 1045, after a successful campaign against the rebel count of Flanders, the margrave of Valenciennes and Ename, Otto received the duchy of Swabia, in exchange however for the cities of Kaiserswerth and Duisburg, which went back to the crown.
- Heinrich I, Count Palatine of Lotharingia (1045–1060, †1061), son of Count Hezzelin I (1020–1033).
- Hermann II, Count Palatine of Lotharingia (1064–1085), Count of the Ruhrgau, Zulpichgau and Brabant. His territorial power was importantly reduced by his guardian, Anno II, Archbishop of Cologne. Hermann is assumed to be the last of the Ezzonids. After his death at Dalhem on September 20, 1085, the Palatinate of Lotharingia was suspended. His widow remarried the first count palatine of the Rhine, Henry of Laach.

The Ezzonid line probably survived in the counts of Limburg Stirum, who are believed to descend from Adolf I of Lotharingia, youngest son of Hermann I.

== Other illustrious Ezzonids ==
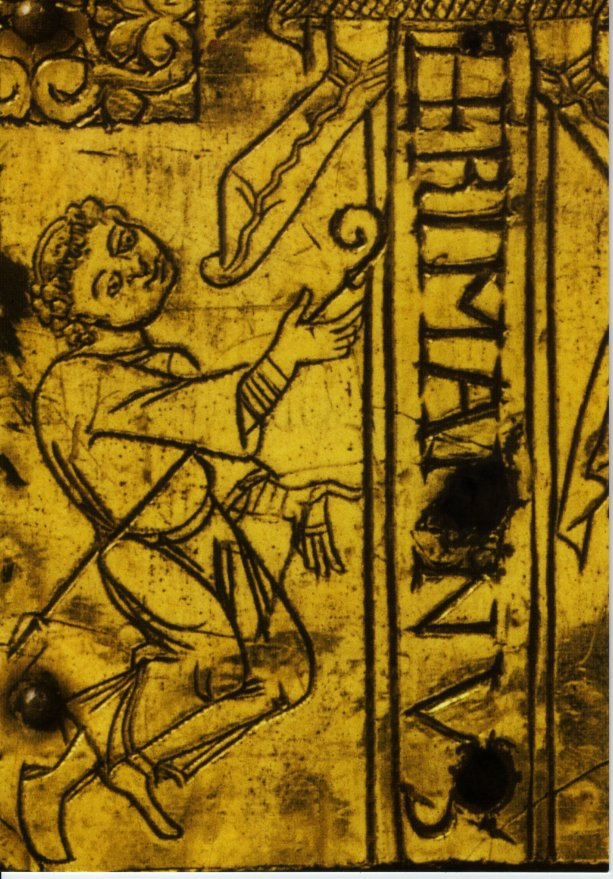
Hermann II, Archbishop of Cologne

- Richeza of Lotharingia, Queen of Poland (Bl. Richenza, whose Feast is celebrated in Roman Catholic Church on March 21), wife of Mieszko II Lambert, King of Poland.
- Conrad I, Duke of Bavaria, heir of Henry III, Holy Roman Emperor, died in exile after an attempt to assassinate the Emperor and seize the throne.
- Conrad III, Duke of Carinthia.
- Hermann I, Archbishop of Cologne, Chancellor of King Zwentibold of Lotharingia.
- Hermann II, Archbishop of Cologne and Chancellor for Italy.
