= Liudolf of Lotharingia =

11th-century German nobleman

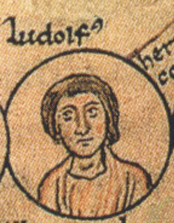

Liudolf of Lotharingia, also Ludolf (c. 1000 – 10 April 1031), was Count of Zutphen and Waldenburg.

He was born in Saxony about 1000, the eldest son of Ezzo, Count Palatine of Lotharingia and Matilde of Germany, daughter of the Emperor Otto II and Theophanu. Besides being Count of Zutphen and Waldenburg, Liudolf was military commander of the army of the Archbishop of Cologne, and protector (Vogt) of the abbeys of Brauweiler, Münster and Borghorst.

He died on 10 April 1031, and was buried with his parents in Brauweiler Abbey.

Liudolf married Matilda of Zutphen, by whom he had issue:

- Heinrich, d. 1031;
- Conrad I (also called Kuno or Cuno), Count of Zutphen and Duke of Bavaria (died in 1055, buried in Cologne);
- Adelheid (born in Zutphen, Gelderland, about 1030), heiress of her brothers to Zutphen, Waldenburg, etc. She married Godeschalk, Count of Zutphen in right of his wife (b. ca. 1030, died 1063/4), mother of Otto II, Count of Zutphen.

== Sources ==
- Wilson, Peter H. (2016). Heart of Europe. Harvard University Press. ISBN 9780674058095.
