= Eberhard I of Bonngau =

Eberhard I, count of Bonngau and count in Zülpichgau and in Keldachgau (fl. 904 – 937), son of Erenfried I of Maasgau.

He left children:

- Hermann I count in Auelgau (922/48), who had children:
  - Eberhard II count in Auelgau (died 966), and
  - Gottfried count in Auelgau (966/70).
- Erenfried II count in Zülpichgau;
- Dietrich, count in Drente and in Salland, count of Hamaland (died before 964). He married Amalrada van Hamaland.
