= Richeza of Lotharingia =

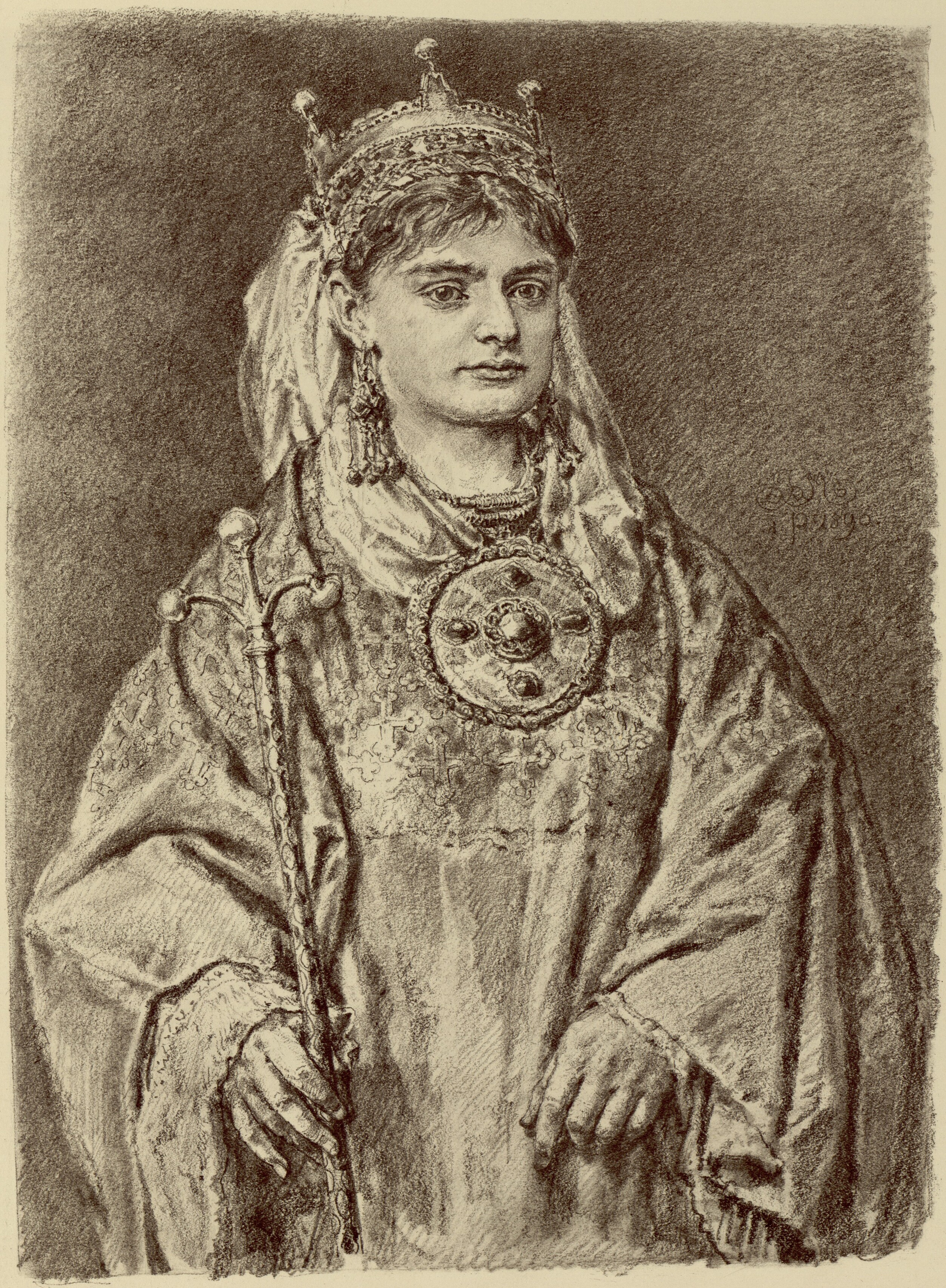

Queen consort of Poland
- Tenure: 1025–1034
- Coronation: 25 December 1025
- Born: c. 996/1000
- Died: 21 March 1063; Saalfeld, Germany
- Burial: Cologne Cathedral, prev. Church of St. Maria ad Gradus, Cologne
- Spouse: Mieszko II Lambert
- Issue: Casimir I, Duke of Poland; Richeza of Poland, Queen of Hungary; Gertrude, Grand Princess of Kiev
- House: Ezzonen
- Father: Ezzo, Count Palatine of Lotharingia
- Mother: Matilda of Germany
- Religion: Roman Catholicism

Richeza of Lotharingia (also called Richenza, Rixa, Ryksa; born about 995/1000 – 21 March 1063) was a member of the Ezzonen dynasty who became queen of Poland as the wife of Mieszko II Lambert. Her Polish marriage was arranged to strengthen the ties between Mieszko and her uncle Emperor Otto III. She returned to Germany following the deposition of her husband in 1031, either divorcing or separating from him. Upon the death of her brother Duke Otto II of Swabia and the consequent extinction of the male line of her family, Richeza became a nun, worked to preserve the Ezzonen heritage, and funded the restoration of the Abbey of Brauweiler. She has been beatified.

== Family and betrothal ==
She was the eldest daughter of Count Palatine Ezzo of Lotharingia by his wife, Matilda, daughter of Emperor Otto II and Empress Theophanu. Richeza's parents were married in 993. Polish historian Kazimierz Jasiński supposed that she was few years younger than her husband Mieszko II Lambert.

In 1000 during the Congress of Gniezno, an agreement was apparently made between Bolesław the Brave and Richeza's uncle Emperor Otto III. Among the usual political talks, they decided to strengthen ties through marriage. Otto's childlessness meant that the seven daughters of his sister Mathilde (the only of Otto II's daughters who married and produced children) were the potential brides for Mieszko, Bolesław I's son and heir; the oldest of Otto III's nieces, Richeza, was chosen. However, Otto's unexpected death in 1002, the reorientation of the Holy Roman Empire politics by his successor, Henry II, and wars between Henry and Bolesław led to the delay of the wedding. The Emperor took the opportunity of a settlement with the Ezzonen family and in Merseburg negotiated a temporary peace with Poland. The marriage between Mieszko and Richeza took place in Merseburg, probably during the Pentecost festivities.

== Queenship ==
After the final peace agreement between the Holy Roman Empire and Poland, which was signed in 1018 in Bautzen, Richeza and Mieszko maintained close contact with the German court. In 1021 they participated in the consecration of part of the Bamberg Cathedral.

Bolesław I the Brave died on 17 June 1025. Six months later, on Christmas Day, Mieszko II Lambert and Richeza were crowned king and queen of Poland by the archbishop of Gniezno, Hipolit, in the Gniezno Cathedral. Mieszko's reign was short-lived: in 1031, the invasion of both German and Kievan troops forced him to escape to Bohemia, where he was imprisoned and castrated by orders of Duke Oldrich. Mieszko II's half-brother Bezprym took the government of Poland and began a cruel persecution of the followers of the former king. The Brauweiler Chronicle indicated that soon after the escape of her husband, Richeza and her children fled to Germany with the Polish regalia, which were given to Emperor Conrad II. She subsequently played an important role in mediating a peace settlement between Poland and the Holy Roman Empire. However, modern historians discount this account.

Richeza and Mieszko II never reunited; according to some sources, they were either officially divorced or separated. After Bezprym was murdered in 1032, Mieszko II was released from captivity and returned to Poland, but was forced to divide the country between himself, his brother Otto and their cousin Dytryk. One year later (1033), after Otto was killed and Dytryk expelled from the country, Mieszko II reunited Poland under his domain. However, his rule lasted only one year: on 10 or 11 July 1034, Mieszko II died suddenly, probably killed as a result of a conspiracy.

Richeza's son Casimir was at that time at the court of her brother Archbishop Hermann II of Cologne. In 1037 Casimir returned to Poland in order to claim the throne; apparently, Richeza also returned with him, although this is disputed. Soon after, a barons' rebellion — coupled with the so-called "Pagan Reaction" of the commoners — forced both Casimir and Richeza to flee to Germany again. She never returned.

== Return to Germany ==
The return of Richeza to Germany forced a redistribution of her father's inheritance because at the previous arrangement, it was not contemplated that Richeza would need a place to live. She received Saalfeld, a possession that did not belong to the Lower Rhine area in which the Ezzonen dynasty tried to build a coherent dominion. Richeza still called herself queen of Poland, a privilege that was given to her by the emperor. In Saalfeld she led the Polish opposition that supported her son Casimir, who in 1039, with the help of Conrad II, finally obtained the Polish throne. During the years 1040–1047, Richeza lived in Klotten in the Moselle region.

On 7 September 1047 Richeza's brother Duke Otto II of Swabia, the last male representative of the Ezzonen dynasty, died, and with him the territorial and political objectives of his family. Richeza now inherited large parts of the Ezzonen possessions.

Otto's death seems to have touched Richeza. At his funeral in Brauweiler, according to Bruno of Toul (later Pope Leo IX), she put her fine jewellery on the altar. She declared that she would spend the rest of her life as a nun to preserve the memory of the Ezzonen dynasty. Another goal was probably to secure the remaining Ezzonen rights.

A charter dated 17 July 1051 noted that Richeza participated in the reorganization of the Ezzonen properties. Her sister Theophanu, Abbess of Essen, and her brother, Hermann II, Archbishop of Cologne and Richeza transferred the Abbey of Brauweiler to the Archdiocese of Cologne. This created a dispute with the Emperor, as this transfer had already occurred under the reign of Ezzo. This was successfully challenged by Ezzo's surviving children. The reason for the transfer was likely that the future wasn't secured for the descendants of the Ezzonen: From Ezzo's ten children, only Richeza and Otto had children. None of these children was in a position of real power over the Ezzonen inheritance. The transfer to the diocese, headed by Hermann II with one of the younger Ezzonen, ensured the cohesion of the property. In 1054 in connection with some donations to the Abbey of Brauweiler, Richeza expressed her desire to be buried there beside her mother. This reorganization, which apparently emanated from the hope that Hermann II would survive his siblings, failed because he died in 1056. The Archbishop of Cologne, Anno II, tried to increase the power of his diocese at the expense of the Ezzonen.

Richeza responded to Anno II's ambitions with the formal renunciation of her possessions in Brauweiler to the monastery of Moselle, while reserving the lifelong use of the lands. Brauweiler was the center of Ezzonen memory and she wanted it protected regardless of the economic position of the family. Then Richeza went to Saalfeld, where she found similar arrangements in favour of the Diocese of Würzburg. Anno II protested against these regulations unsuccessfully. In the end, Richeza only maintained direct rule over the towns of Saalfeld and Coburg, but retained the right to use until her death seven other locations in the Rhineland with their additional incomes, and 100 silver pounds per year by the Archdiocese of Cologne. Richeza died on 21 March 1063 in Saalfeld.

== Heritage ==
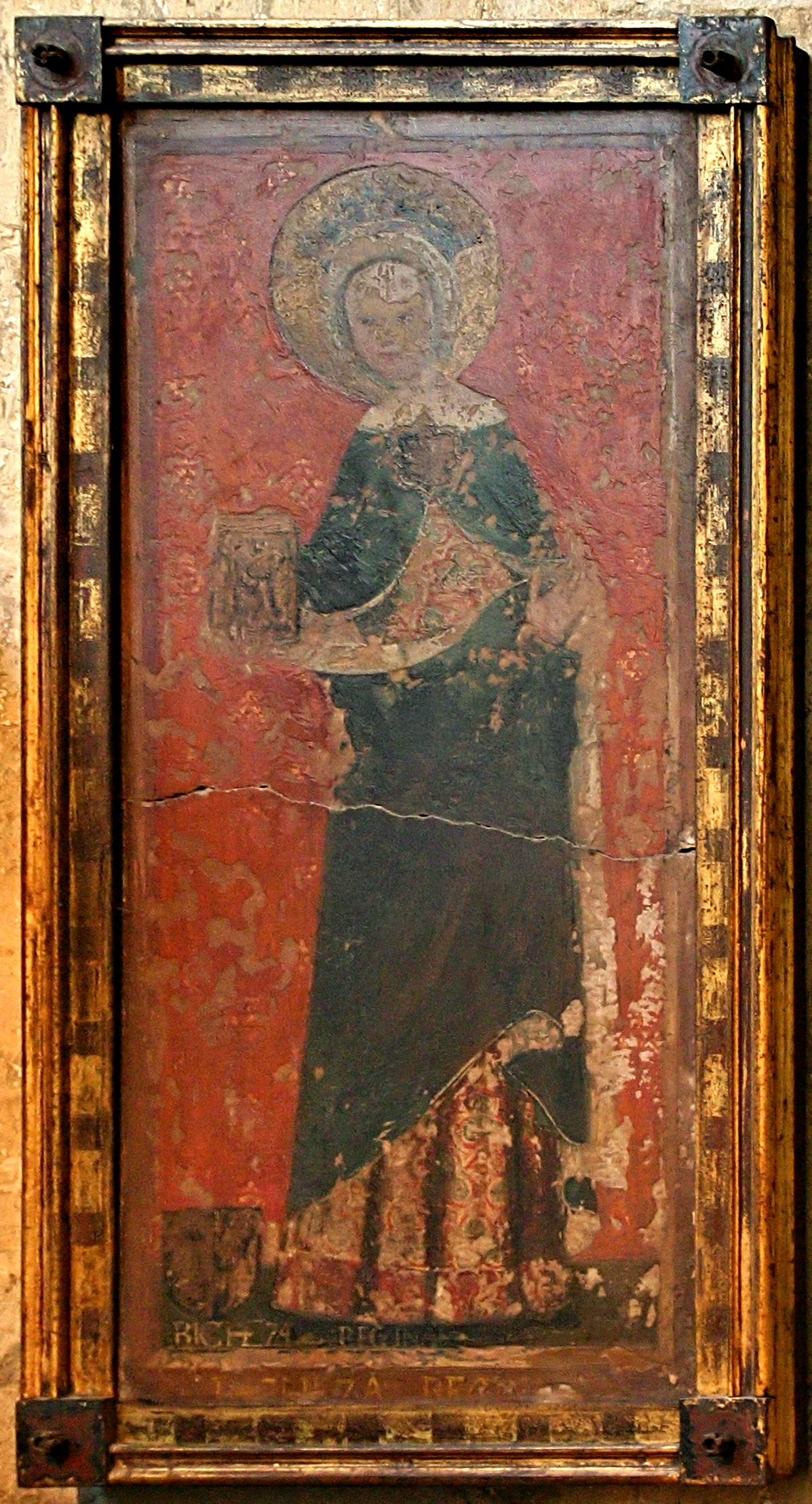
Image of Richeza in Cologne Cathedral

Richeza was buried in Cologne's church of St. Maria ad Gradus and not, as she had wished, in Brauweiler. This was prompted by Archbishop Anno II, who appealed to an oral agreement with Richeza. The Klotten estate donated her funeral arrangements to St. Maria ad Gradus, whose relationship with Richeza, Hermann II and Anno II is unclear. Possibly St. Maria ad Gradus was an unfinished work of Richeza's brother and completed by Anno II, who wanted to secure part of the Ezzonen patrimony in this way. The Brauweiler Abbey claimed the validity of the 1051 charter and demanded the remains of the Polish Queen.

The dispute ended in 1090 when the then-current archbishop of Cologne, Hermann III, ruled in favour of the monastery of Brauweiler. However, Richeza's grave remained in St. Maria ad Gradus until 1816, when it was transferred to Cologne Cathedral. Her grave was placed in the chapel dedicated to St. John the Baptist in a classic wooden sarcophagus. Beside the coffin hang two medieval portraits of Richeza and Anno II that originate from the medieval grave in St. Maria ad Gradus.

Her grave was opened multiple times after the transfer to Cologne Cathedral. The last opening was in 1959 and revealed her bones. According to witnesses, Richeza had a small and graceful stature. Her collarbone showed traces of a fracture. Richeza's relics were located in St. Nicholas church in Brauweiler and were moved to the Klotter parish church in 2002.

== Marriage and issue ==
Richeza and Mieszko had:

- Richeza (born 1013) - married Béla I of Hungary
- Casimir (born 1016) - Duke of Poland
- Gertruda (born 1025), married Grand Prince Iziaslav I of Kiev
- possibly Agatha, wife of Edward the Exile, whose origins are unknown. One theory that has been put forward is that she was the daughter of Mieszko II and Richeza.

== Legacy ==
The most important of Richeza's projects was the rebuilding of the Abbey of Brauweiler. Her parents had founded Brauweiler, but the original church was modestly furnished, which was incompatible with the dynasty's territorial objectives. After Otto's death, Richeza decided to make Brauweiler the centre of Ezzonen memory. Since the original building didn't suit this purpose, Richeza built a new abbey, which remains in good condition. When the construction began a three-aisled pillared basilica was planned with a projecting transept to the east apse across a crypt. The aisles were groined vaults with flat ceilings in the central nave. Inside, the nave had five Pfeilerjoche, each of which was half as large as the square crossing. Throughout the Abbey the cross-vaulted ceiling could be seen (for example in the aisles, pillars or the crypt), which can be found in many Ezzonen buildings. The crypt was consecrated on 11 December 1051. The rest of the construction was consecrated on 30 October 1063, seven months after Richeza's death.

The building has distinct references to the Church of St. Maria im Kapitol in Cologne, founded by Richeza's sister Ida. Both crypts are laid out identically, the two bays in Brauweiler, however, were shorter. In the upper church, there are clear references. Brauweiler is seen as a copy of the Cologne Cathedral, probably thanks to the influence of Richeza's brother Hermann II, who in 1040 consecrated Stavelot Abbey. Richeza planned to make Brauweiler the Ezzonen family crypt, in 1051 interring the remains of her sister Adelaide, Abbess of Nivelles. In 1054 she transferred the remains of her father from Augsburg to be buried next to her sister.

The Gospel Book of Queen Richeza (today in possession of the Universitäts- und Landesbibliothek Darmstadt), comes from St. Maria ad Gradus, where Richeza had a space reserved in the central nave, normally occupied by the Donors. It is not clear whether this was done at the behest of Anno II, or by Richeza. An indication of the latter thesis, however, is the Gospel Book. The manuscript is made of 153 pages in the pergamin style in an 18 x 13.5 cm format. In 150 of the pages of the book, a prayer is recorded, which suggests a high-born owner. The following pages contain entries about the Ezzonen memorial. In addition to Richeza, Anno II and her parents were named. The entries can be counted among drawings in the Codex style recognized around 1100. The Codex itself was built around 1040, probably in Maasland, with incomplete ornamentation: the Mark and Luke are drawn completely, but only in a preliminary sketch. Matthew wasn't drawn. Another possible indication is the Codex date: After 1047, Richeza took her monastic vows and had no need for a personal representative signature. It is unknown whether it remained in her possession and was used together with other relics of Anno II from her estate of St. Maria ad Gradus, or had already been donated to her brother before her death.

== Sources ==
- Bernhardt, John W. (2002). Itinerant Kingshiop & Royal Monasteries in Early Medieval Germany, c.936-1075. Cambridge University Press.
- Wilson, Peter H. (2016). Heart of Europe. Harvard University Press.

Richeza of Lotharingia Ezzonids Born: c. 995/1000 Died: 21 March 1063
Royal titles
Preceded by Oda of Meissen	Queen consort of Poland; 1025–1034	Vacant Title next held by Wyszesława of Kiev
