= Pilgrim (archbishop of Cologne) =

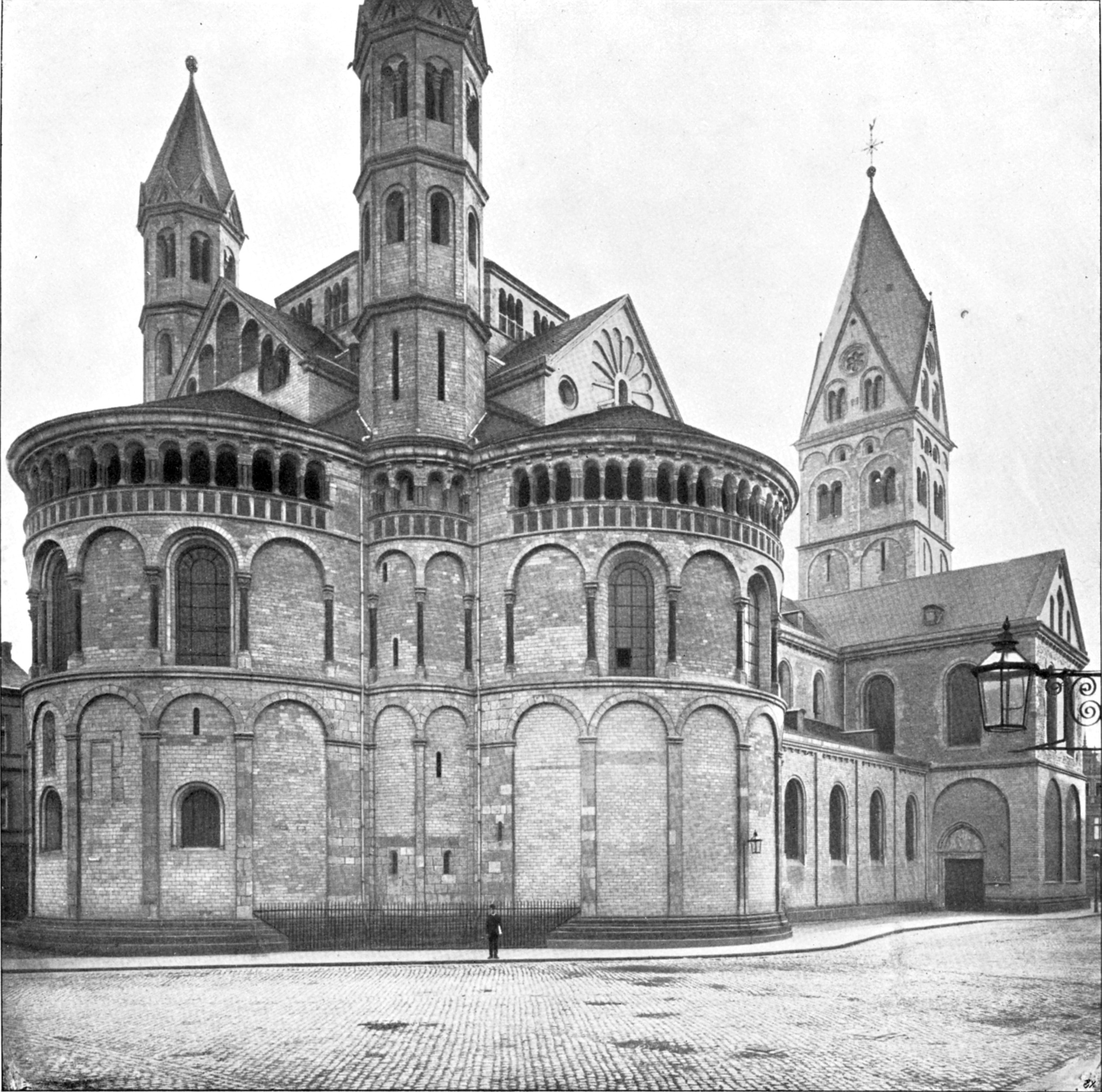
Sankt Aposteln in Cologne, founded by Pilgrim, c. 1023

Pilgrim (Latin: Pilgrimus; c. 985 – 25 August 1036) was a statesman and prelate of the Holy Roman Empire. In 1016 he took charge of the chancery of the Kingdom of Italy, and became the first archchancellor in 1031. In 1021 he became Archbishop of Cologne. For his part in the imperial campaign against the South Italian principalities in 1022, the chronicler Amatus of Montecassino described him as "warlike".

== Early life ==
Pilgrim belonged to a Bavarian family of the Aribonids. He was born around 985. His father was Chadalhoh IV (died 11 September 1030), count of Isengau. His older brother, Chadalhoh V (died 29 October 1050), inherited the Isengau, while Pilgrim entered the church. He had important relations in the church, since his uncle Aribo was the archbishop of Mainz and his great-uncle Hartwig was the archbishop of Salzburg. Pilgrim's primary education began at Salzburg Cathedral under the direction of Hartwig, and there he became a canon as a young man.

In 1015, through Hartwig's intervention, Pilgrim was appointed to the royal chapel. In 1016, when the Emperor Henry II founded Bamberg Cathedral he named Pilgrim its provost. After defeating his rival, Arduin, for the Kingdom of Italy, the emperor placed Pilgrim in charge of his separate Italian chancery. In 1016 Pilgrim undertook a journey to northern Italy to reconcile the emperor to those magnates who had supported Arduin. He was so successful that in January 1017 an Italian embassy travelled to the assembly then in session at Allstedt to greet the emperor. In the October or November 1017 Pilgrim returned to Germany, and in January 1018 the last hostage of the Otbertine family, which had supported Arduin, was released by Henry.

On 17 April 1020, when Pope Benedict VIII celebrated Easter at Bamber, Pilgrim was present. In 1021 Pilgrim was rewarded with the archbishopric of Cologne. His appointment was made while his predecessor, Heribert (died 16 March), was still on his deathbed. He received his episcopal ordination on 29 June in the emperor's presence.

== Italian campaign of 1021–22 ==
In December 1021, the Emperor Henry invaded Italy with a large army. He divided into three columns, the centre under himself and the wings under Pilgrim of Cologne and Poppo of Aquileia. Pilgrim's column marched down the Tyrrhenian coast towards the Principality of Capua, passing through Rome on its way. According to the Chronica monasterii Casinensis, this force numbered some 20,000 strong. Pilgrim was sent to arrest the abbot of Monte Cassino, Atenulf, and the prince of Capua, Pandulf IV. The former escaped and the latter, abandoned by his supporters and his Norman mercenaries, surrendered after the citizens opened the gates to the imperial army. Pilgrim then besieged the city of Salerno for forty days. When its prince, Guaimar III, offered to give hostages, Pilgrim accepted the prince's son and co-prince, Guaimar IV, and lifted the siege. Duke Sergius IV of Naples also offered hostages to Pilgrim to avoid a siege.

Pilgrim then led his army east to join the siege of Troia already in progress. At Troia the emperor condemned Pandulf to death, but the archbishop intervened to get the sentence commuted to one year's imprisonment north of the Alps. Pilgrim also intervened to have Count Pandulf of Teano appointed prince of Capua in Pandulf IV's place. This was confirmed by an imperial diploma that, at Pilgrim's request, specifically mentioned the good relations between the imperial court and the Capuan princely dynasty. The siege of Troia dragged on from 12 April until late June, when the emperor, in pain from a gall stone, lifted it in order to attend a church council.

== Coronations of 1024 and 1028 ==
After the campaigning in southern Italy was done (1022), Pilgrim went to Rome to receive his pallium from Pope Benedict VIII, who also bestowed on him the dignity of Apostolic Librarian (bibliothecarius). It is possible that the pope also bestowed on Pilgrim the right to crown the king of Germany on this occasion. He had returned to Germany by April 1024. On 4 September 1024, the princes of the Empire elected Conrad the Elder of the Salian dynasty as king and future emperor. At the meeting of the princes held at the field of Kamba on the Rhine, Pilgrim, as de facto leader of the Lotharingian contingent, supported Conrad's cousin, Conrad the Younger. He further offended the emperor elect by leaving the assembly early.

Conrad was crowned on 8 September by Aribo of Mainz, who refused to crown his wife, Gisela, on the grounds that their marriage was invalid and consanguineous. On 21 September Pilgrim crowned Gisela queen in Cologne Cathedral, which led to a rapid rapprochement between king and prelate. He tried to reconcile Duke Gothelo I of Lotharingia, but was unsuccessful.

Pilgrim continued to benefit from Aribo and Conrad's estrangement when, at Aachen on 14 April 1028 (Easter Sunday), he crowned Conrad and Gisela's son, Henry III, following his election as King of Germany to replace his father, who had been crowned emperor by the pope. A convention was established, and from this point on the archbishops of Cologne, not those of Mainz, crowned the kings of Germany. In June 1031, Conrad appointed Pilgrim archchancellor for Italy, an honour that remained with the archbishops of Cologne throughout the Middle Ages.

== Diocesan projects ==
Pilgrim was a reformer and a builder, extending the western suburbs of his city by the foundation of the Romanesque basilica of the Holy Apostles (1022/4), a mint (c. 1027) and a new market. On 8 November 1029 he consecrated the abbey of Brauweiler. His extensive influence in the Rhineland involved him a dispute over the right to the tithes of the land between the Rhine and the Ruhr with Sophia, abbess of Gandersheim and Essen. His wealth and learning are evident in his rich donations to his own cathedral and to Monte Cassino. The musical theorist Berno of Reichenau dedicated his work on the tonarius to Pilgrim.

Pilgrim supported the Cluniac reforms, and took part in the negotiations between Henry II and King Robert II of France in August 1023. He attended the council of Frankfurt in September 1027. His last major action was to oppose the appointment of Conrad the Younger to the Duchy of Carinthia in 1035. Pilgrim died suddenly in Nijmegen while attending the wedding of Henry III and Gunhilda of Denmark. He was buried in the church he had founded dedicated to the Holy Apostles.

== Sources ==
- Amatus (2004). Loud, Graham A. (ed.). The History of the Normans. Translated by Dunbar, Prescott N. Woodbridge: Boydell Press.
- Ennen, Edith (1989). The Medieval Woman. Translated by Jephcott, Edmund F. N. Oxford: Basil Blackwell.
- Gwatkin, H. M.; Whitney, J. P.; Tanner, J. R.; Previté-Orton, C. W. (1922). The Cambridge Medieval History: Germany and the Western Empire. Cambridge: Cambridge University Press.
- Korth, Leonard (1888). "Piligrim, Erzbischof von Köln". Allgemeine Deutsche Biographie. Vol. 26. Bayerischen Akademie der Wissenschaften. pp. 129–31.
- Norwich, John Julius (1967). The Normans in the South. London: Longman.
- Seibert, Hubertus (2001). "Pilgrim". Neue Deutsche Biographie. Vol. 20. pp. 440f.
- Warner, David A. (1995). "Thietmar of Merseburg on Rituals of Kingship". Viator. 26: 53–76. doi:10.1484/J.VIATOR.2.301135.

| Preceded by Heribert | Archbishop of Cologne; 1021–1036 | Succeeded by Herman II |
