= Ezzo, Count Palatine of Lotharingia =

German count (c. 955–1034)

Ezzo
- Count Palatine of Lotharingia
- Born: c. 955; Lotharingia
- Died: 21 March 1034; Saalfeld, Thuringia
- Noble family: Ezzonen
- Spouse: Matilda of Germany
- Issue: Liudolf of Lotharingia; Otto II, Duke of Swabia; Herman II (archbishop of Cologne); Theophanu, Abbess of Essen; Richeza of Lotharingia
- Father: Herman I, Count Palatine of Lotharingia
- Mother: Heylwig of Dillingen

Ezzo (c. 955 – 21 March 1034), sometimes called Ehrenfried, a member of the Ezzonid dynasty, was Count Palatine of Lotharingia from 1015 until his death. As brother-in-law of Emperor Otto III, father of Queen Richeza of Poland and several other illustrious children, he was one of the most important figures of the Rhenish history of his time.

== Life ==
Ezzo was the son of the Lotharingian count palatine Herman I and his wife Heylwig of Dillingen. He was sent as a child to be educated by Bishop Ulrich of Augsburg (episcopate 923–973), a relative of his mother. Nothing is known about his youth.

Having married Matilda of Germany (died 1025), a daughter of Emperor Otto II and his consort Theophanu, Ezzo became prominent during the reign of his brother-in-law, Emperor Otto III. The marriage was expressly consented by the Dowager Empress Theophanu, probably to rally the powerful family of Ezzo to the throne. Matilda received as dowry out of Ottonian possessions lands in Thuringia and in the Duchy of Franconia (Orlamünde and the East Franconian territories of Coburg and Salz), while her husband gave her as dowry the family estate of Brauweiler near Cologne.

At the death of his father in 996, Herman's rich allodial property was shared between his sons. Ezzo received lands in Cochem on the Mosel river, in Maifeld, the Flamersheimer Wald and estates around Tomburg Castle near Rheinbach, as well as half the usufruct of Villewaldin. About the same time, he must have received the Palatinate and previous comital rights, as he is referred as count in the Auelgau in 1015 and as Count Palatine in the Bonngau in 1020. He also received the county of Ruhrgau with tutelage of Essen Abbey.

Unsuccessful candidate to the imperial throne upon the death of Emperor Otto III in 1002, his relation with the new Ottonian king Henry II was immediately very tense. Henry disputed Ezzo's ownership of territories, that he defended as his wife's inheritance of late Otto III. The conflict dragged on for years and reached its peak in 1011. Facing disturbances in Lotharingia, and in need for Ezzo's military support, Henry was forced to come to terms. Ezzo's victory led the king to make concessions and to a complete transformation of its policy. He reconciled with Ezzo, recognized its rights of inheritance and gave him the royal territories of Kaiserswerth, Duisburg as well as Saalfeld in Thuringia for renouncing to the throne. He also associated the Ezzonid dynasty to his Eastern policies, and mediated the marriage of Ezzo's daughter Richeza with the heir to the Polish throne Mieszko II Lambert.

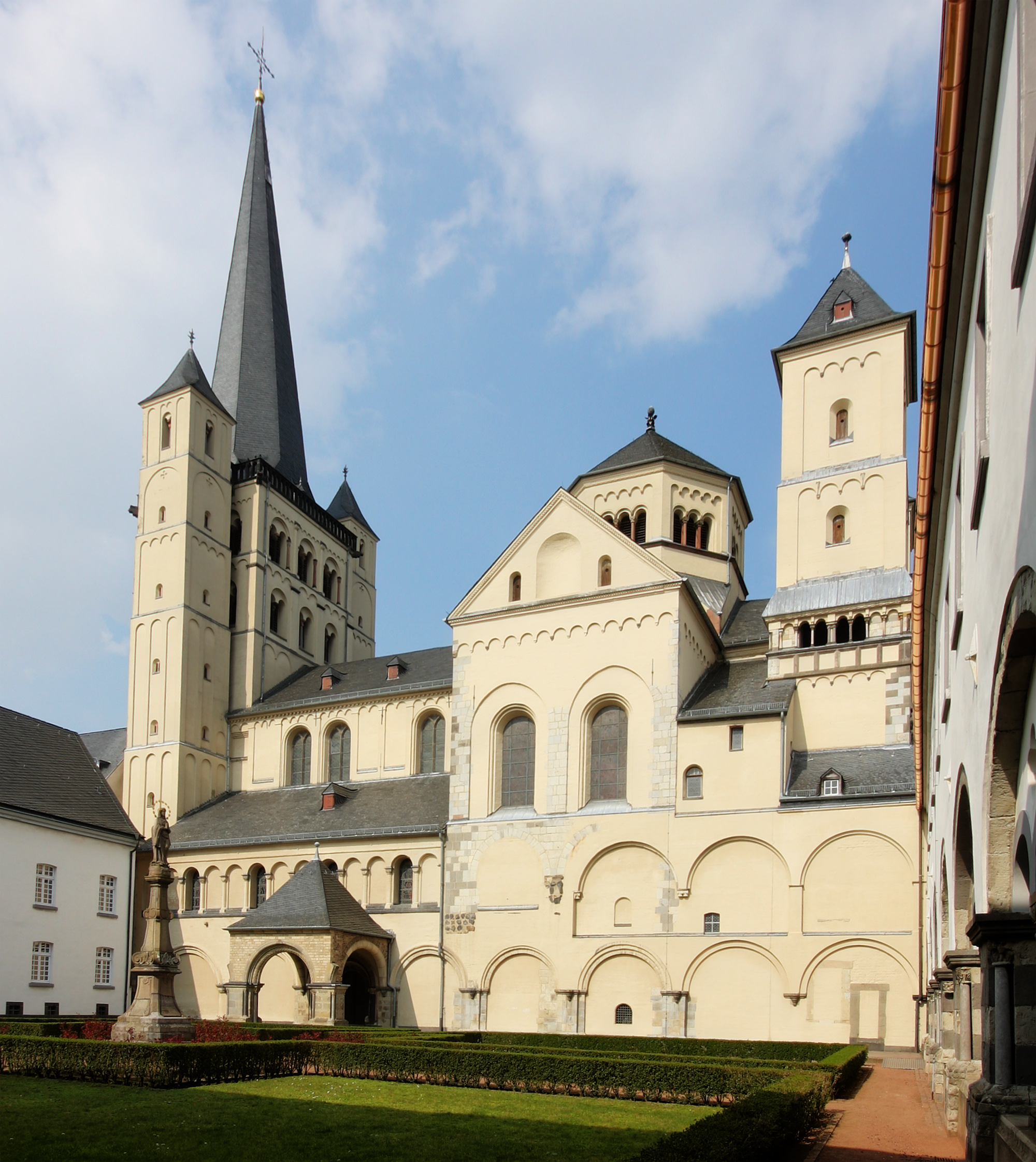
St. Nicholas' Church at Brauweiler Abbey, founded by Ezzo in 1024

These huge territorial concessions made Ezzo one of the most powerful princes in the Empire. Ezzo's growing power and the increased prestige of his house were reflected in the founding of the family, Brauweiler Abbey, the place where his marriage had been celebrated and whose construction begun after a trip to Rome of the couple in 1024. The Benedictine monastery, which was consecrated in 1028 by Archbishop Pilgrim of Cologne, was to be the grave and spiritual centre of the Ezzonid dynasty.

Henry II died in July 1024 without an heir. Conrad, a great-grandson of Liutgard of Saxony, daughter of Otto I, was elected King of the Romans. In November 1025, Ezzo, who was a supporter of Conrad, invited the Lotharingian nobles to Aachen where they paid homage to the new king, included some, such as Pilgrim, (archbishop of Cologne), who had previously withheld their support. Ezzo's wife Matilda died unexpectedly during a visit to Ezzo's brother Hermann in Echtz, while Ezzo was in Aachen. She was buried at Brauweiler Abbey.

Very little is known about Ezzo's later life, but we are told that he died at a great age at Saalfeld on 21 March 1034, and was buried in Brauweiler.

Ezzo life and offices are described in the Fundatio monasterii Brunwilarensis. He was mostly active in political affairs when it came to his own interests and the standing of his house, and where he could increase his territories and authority. His management of the favours of Empress Theophano, Emperor Otto III and later Henry II, testify of his personal ambition and political dexterity.

== Children ==
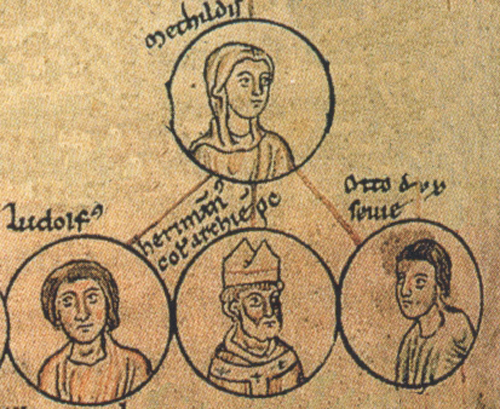
Ezzo's wife Matilda with her sons Liudolf, Herman and Otto, Chronica sancti Pantaleonis (1237)

Ezzo and Mathilda had:

- Liudolf (c. 1000–10 April 1031), Count of Zütphen.
- Otto II (died 1047), Count Palatine of Lotharingia and later Duke of Swabia as Otto II.
- Herman II (995–1056), Archbishop of Cologne.
- Theophanu (died 1058), Abbess of Essen and Gerresheim.
- Richeza (died 21 March 1063), Queen of Poland, married with King Mieszko II Lambert.
- Adelheid (died c. 1030), Abbess of Nivelles (Nijvel).
- Heilwig, Abbess of Neuss.
- Mathilde, Abbess of Dietkirchen and Vilich.
- Sophie, Abbess of St. Maria, Mainz.
- Ida (died 1060), Abbess of Cologne and Gandersheim Abbey (founded in 852 by her ancestor Liudolf, Duke of Saxony).

== Sources ==
- Bernhardt, John W. (2002). Itinerant Kingship & Royal Monasteries in Early Medieval Germany, c.936-1075. Cambridge University Press.
- Warner, David, ed. (2001). Ottonian Germany: The Chronicon of Thietmar of Merseburg. Manchester University Press.
- Wolfram, Herwig (2010). Conrad II, 990-1039: Emperor of Three Kingdoms. Penn State Press.
- Kimpen, E., 'Ezzonen und Hezeliniden in der rheinischen Pfalzgrafschaft', Mitteilungen des Österreichischen Instituts für Geschichtsforschung. XII. Erg.-Band. (Innsbruck 1933) S.1–91.
- Lewald, Ursula, 'Die Ezzonen. Das Schicksal eines rheinischen Fürstengeschlechts', Rheinische Vierteljahrsblätter 43 (1979) S.120–168.
- Steinbach, F., 'Die Ezzonen. Ein Versuch territorialpolitischen Zusammenschlusses der fränkischen Rheinlande', Collectanea Franz Steinbach. Aufsätze und Abhandlungen zur Verfassungs-, Sozial- und Wirtschaftsgeschichte, geschichtlichen Landeskunde und Kulturraumforschung, ed. F. Petri en G. Droege (Bonn 1967) S.64–81.
- Van Droogenbroeck, F.J., 'Paltsgraaf Herman II (†1085) en de stichting van de abdij van Affligem (28 juni 1062)’, Jaarboek voor Middeleeuwse Geschiedenis 2 (Hilversum 1999) S.38–95.
- Van Droogenbroeck, F.J., 'De betekenis van paltsgraaf Herman II (1064–1085) voor het graafschap Brabant', Eigen Schoon en De Brabander 87 (Brussels 2004) S.1–166.
- Wolter, Heinz, Ezzo Pfalzgraf von Lothringen, http://www.rheinische-geschichte.lvr.de/persoenlichkeiten/E/Seiten/Ezzo.aspx.

Ezzo, Count Palatine of Lotharingia Ezzonids Born: c. 955 Died: 21 March 1034
Preceded by Hermann I	Count Palatine of Lotharingia; 1015–1034	Succeeded by Otto I
