= Herman I (archbishop of Cologne) =

Archbishop of Cologne

Herman I (died 11 April c. 924) served as Archbishop of Cologne from 889, until his death around 924. He was the son of Erenfried I of Maasgau, of the Ezzonian dynasty. As chancellor of Zwentibold, King of Lotharingia, he helped to execute in 911 his kingdom's annexation to West Francia. In 921, he was a signatory of the Treaty of Bonn and, in 922, participated in the Synod of Koblenz.

He died around 924 and was buried in the Hildebold Dom in Cologne.

Catholic Church titles
| Preceded by Wilbert | Archbishop of Cologne; 889–c. 924 | Succeeded by Wigfrid |
