= Herman I, Count Palatine of Lotharingia =

Herman I "the Slender"

Count Palatine of Lotharingia
- Reign: 945-996
- Predecessor: new title
- Successor: Ezzo (Erenfried)
- Died: 996
- Noble family: Ezzonids
- Spouses: Heylwig of Dillingen; Dietbirg of Swabia
- Issue: Ezzo, Count Palatine of Lotharingia; Hezzelin I, Count of Zülpichgau; Hermann II im Keldachgau, Vogt of Deutz; Adolf I of Lotharingia; Richenza of Lotharingia, Abbess of Nivelles
- Father: Erenfried II
- Mother: Richwara of Zülpichgau

Herman I (died 996), called Pusillus or the Slender, was the Count Palatine of Lotharingia, and of several counties along the Rhine, including Bonngau, Eifelgau, Mieblgau, Zülpichgau, Keldachgau, Alzey and Auelgau, from 945 until his death in 996.

He was the son of Erenfried II and Richwara of Zülpichgau. He was first married to Heylwig von Dillingen; secondly, to Dietbirg of Swabia. He left four sons and one daughter:

- Ezzo (Erenfried), Count Palatine of Lotharingia from 1015 until 1034
- Hezzelin I (sometimes called Hezilo, Hermann or Heinrich) Count of Zülpichgau (d. 1033). He married a daughter of Conrad I, Duke of Carinthia.
- Hermann II im Keldachgau, Vogt of Deutz (d. 1040)
- Adolf I of Lotharingia, Count of Keldachgau, Vogt of Deutz (1008–1018)
- Richenza of Lotharingia, Abbess of Nivelles.

== Sources ==
- Gerstner, Ruth, 'Die Geschichte der lothringischen Pfalzgrafschaft (von den Anfängen bis zur Ausbildung des Kurterritoriums Pfalz)', Rheinisches Archiv 40 (Bonn 1941)
- Kimpen, E., 'Ezzonen und Hezeliniden in der rheinischen Pfalzgrafschaft', Mitteilungen des Österreichischen Instituts für Geschichtsforschung. XII. Erg.-Band. (Innsbruck 1933) p. 1–91.
- Lewald, Ursula, 'Die Ezzonen. Das Schicksal eines rheinischen Fürstengeschlechts', Rheinische Vierteljahrsblätter 43 (1979) p. 120–168
- Steinbach, F., 'Die Ezzonen. Ein Versuch territorialpolitischen Zusammenschlusses der fränkischen Rheinlande', Collectanea Franz Steinbach. Aufsätze und Abhandlungen zur Verfassungs-, Sozial- und Wirtschaftsgeschichte, geschichtlichen Landeskunde und Kulturraumforschung, ed. F. Petri en G. Droege (Bonn 1967) p. 64–81.

Herman I, Count Palatine of Lotharingia Ezzonids Died: 996
New title	Count Palatine of Lotharingia; 945–996	Succeeded by Ezzo (Erenfried)
