= Egbert Psalter =

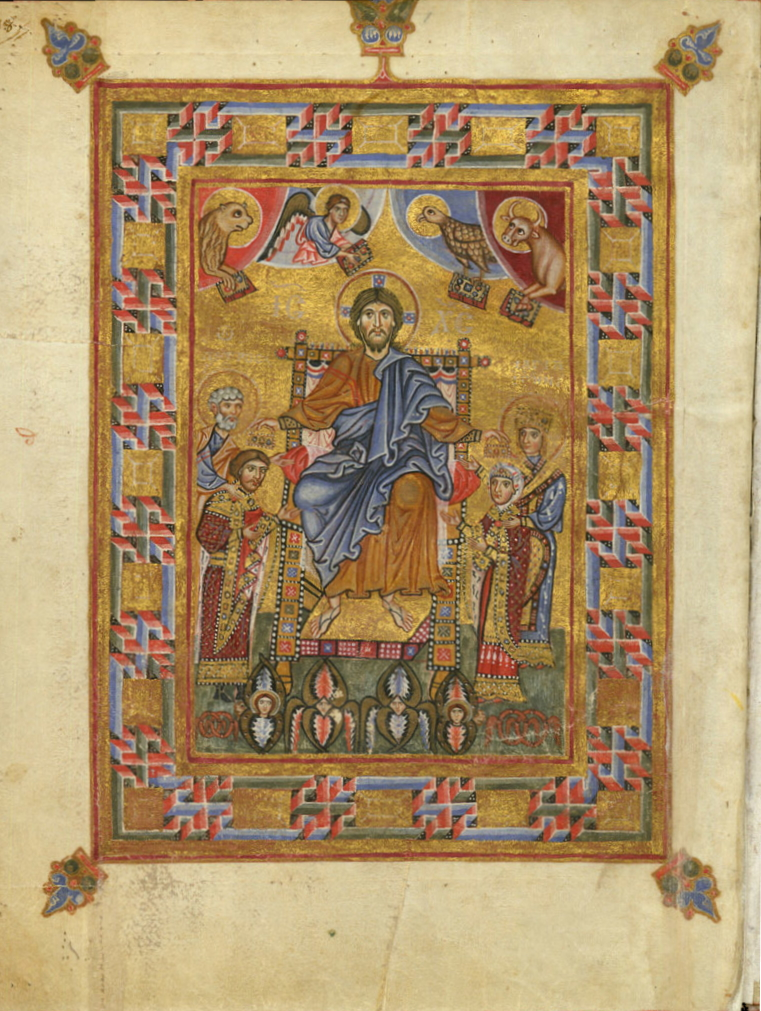
Christ crowning Gertrude and Yaropolk, illumination from the Trier Psalter

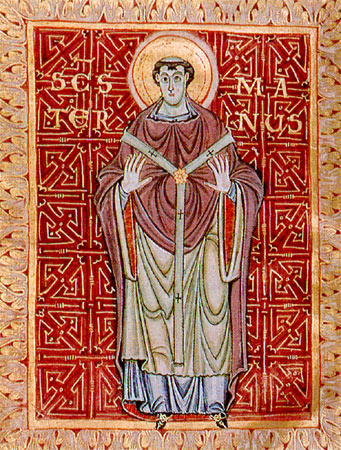
Maturnus of Cologne, from the earlier illuminations

The Egbert Psalter (also known as the Gertrude Psalter or Trier Psalter) is a medieval illuminated manuscript Psalter preserved in the municipal museum of Cividale, Italy (Ms. CXXXVI). The psalter is an example of the illuminated manuscripts associated with the Ottonian Renaissance.

It was originally created around the year 980 by the monks of the Abbey of Reichenau (a monk named Ruodprecht is mentioned in the original dedication) for Archbishop Egbert of Trier. In the mid-11th century, the book passed to Gertrude of Poland, wife of Iziaslav of Kiev. She included her prayer book as part of the codex and commissioned its illuminations, which blend Byzantine and Romanesque traditions.

In the 12th century, the codex was in the possession of the Andechs-Merania family, and was given to Elizabeth of Hungary either by her mother, Gertrude of Merania, or by her aunt, Saint Hedwig of Andechs. According to a 16th-century note on folio 8r, Saint Elizabeth gave the codex to the cathedral of Cividale in 1229.

The book features a large picture of Apostle Peter venerated by Gertrude and her son Yaropolk, whose Christian name was Peter. It is known that Yaropolk was the first to build a church to St Peter in Kiev and that he placed an image of that saint on his coins. In 1075 he was sent by his dethroned father to Rome in order to secure the Pope's support in recompense for bringing Rus' under the patronage of St Peter ("patrocinium beati Petri"). There are two letters of Pope Gregory VII to the king of Poland and to Svyatoslav II of Kiev admonishing them to return the Kievan throne to Iziaslav.

== See also ==
- List of illuminated manuscripts
