= Erenfried I =

Erenfried I of Maasgau was the count of Bliesgau, Keldachgau, Bonngau, and the count of Charmois (fl. 866–904). He married Adelgunde of Burgundy (860–902), a daughter of Conrad II, Duke of Transjurane Burgundy, Count of Auxerre, and Judith de Frioul.

They left children:

- Eberhard I, Count of Bonngau, count in Zülpichgau and in Keldachgau,
- Hermann I, Archbishop of Cologne (890–924), Chancellor of King Zwentibold of Lorraine,
- Ermenfried.
