= Brauweiler Abbey =

Coordinates: 50°57′40″N 6°46′58″E

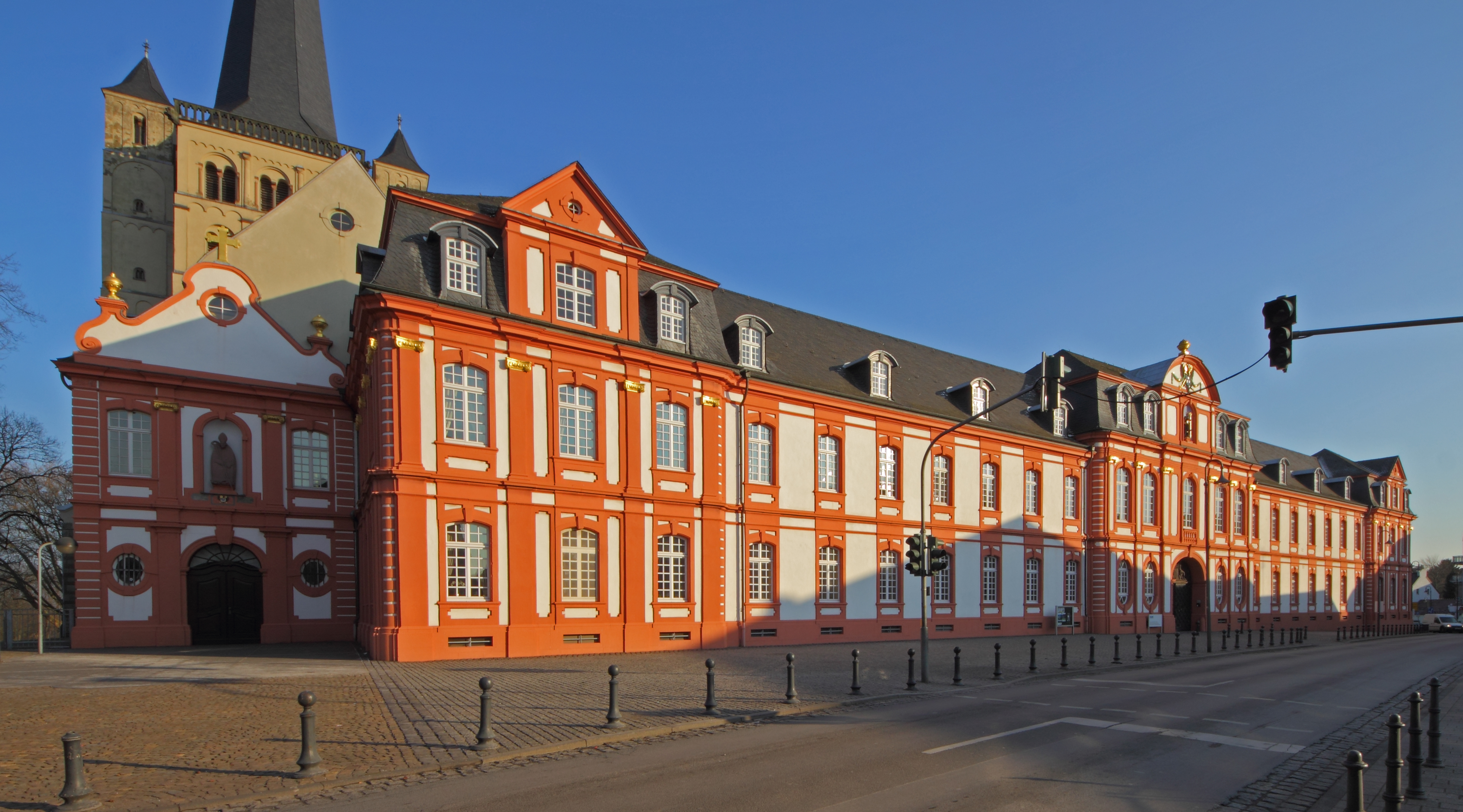
Brauweiler Abbey as seen from outside

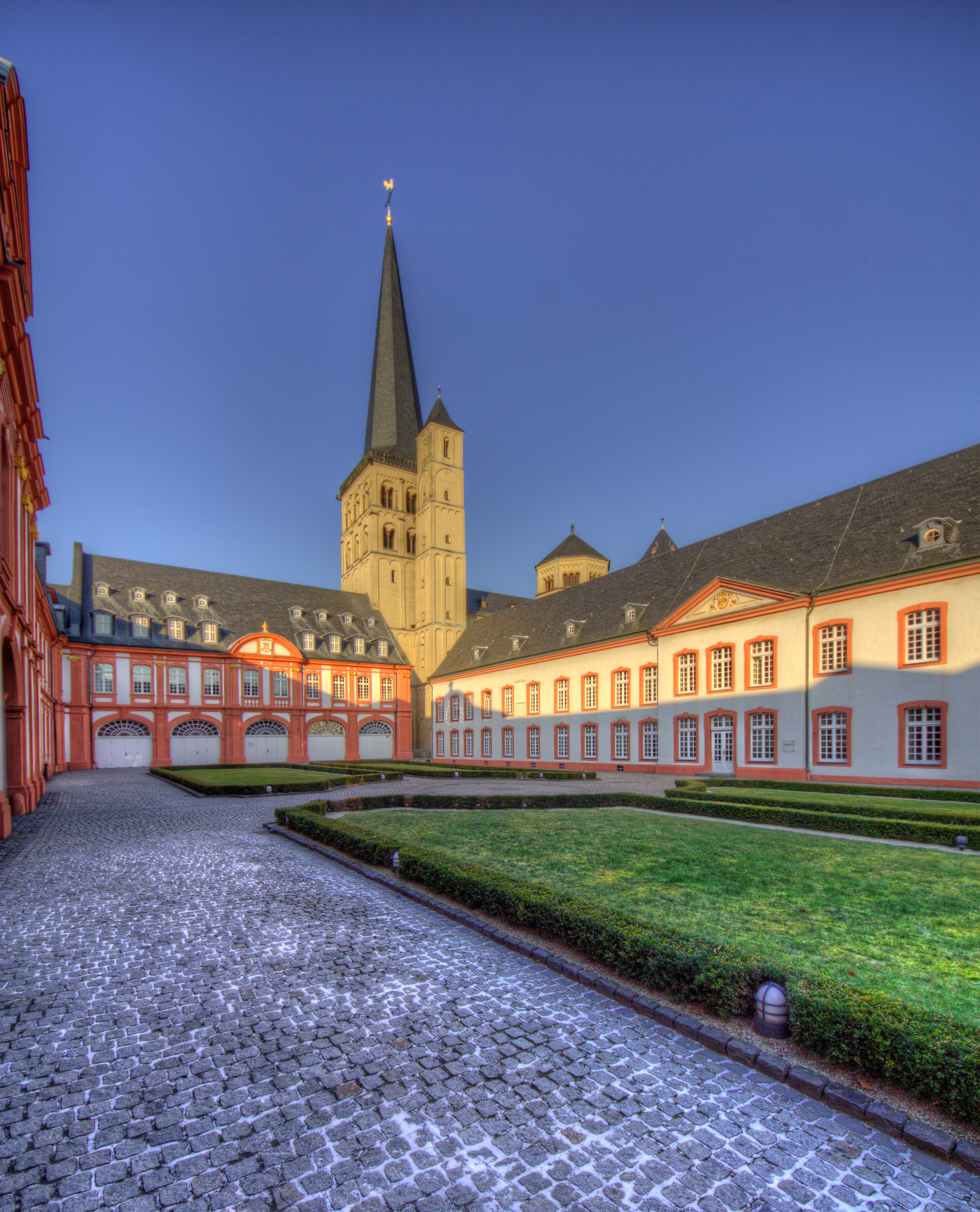
Inner yard with St. Nicholas' church, formerly the church of Brauweiler Abbey, in the background

Brauweiler Abbey (German: Abtei Brauweiler) is a former Benedictine monastery located at Brauweiler, now in Pulheim near Cologne, North Rhine-Westphalia, in Germany. It is now used as a regional cultural center.

== History ==
The monastery was founded and endowed in 1024 by Pfalzgraf Ezzo, count palatine of Lotharingia of the Ezzonian dynasty and his wife Matilda of Germany, a daughter of Emperor Otto II and Theophano. There was already at the time, a chapel dedicated to St. Medardus on the estate. Ezzo and Matilda were buried here, as were their two eldest sons Liudolf, Count Palatine of Lotharingia (d. 1031) and Otto II, Duke of Swabia (d. 1047).

In 1048 Richeza of Lotharingia, eldest daughter of Ezzo and Matilda, built a new abbey church dedicated to Saints Nicholas and Medardus. From 1065 until his death in 1091, Wolfhelm of Brauweiler, later Saint Wolfhelm, was abbot here. His relics were enshrined in the abbey church, and miracles were reported at his tomb, but all traces of them were lost centuries ago.

The present abbey church, now the parish church of Saint Nicholas and Saint Medardus, is the third building on the site, built between 1136 and 1220, using part of the previous church. Bernard of Clairvaux visited the abbey in 1147. In 1547, Charles V, Holy Roman Emperor bestowed upon the abbey the title Reichsabtei. Construction on the baroque courtyard began in 1780.

The abbey was occupied by the French in 1794, and abolished by Napoleon in 1802. The premises were subsequently used, under a Napoleonic law, as a hostel for beggars, and the abbey church became a parish church. From 1815 under the Prussian regime it was used as a workhouse.

From 1933 to 1945 the buildings were used for the internment, torture, and murder of political and social "undesirables" by the Gestapo and the civil authorities of the Nazi government. Prisoners included Konrad Adenauer, the former mayor of Cologne and first Chancellor of the Federal Republic of Germany. From 1945 to 1949, it was an open camp for displaced persons administered first by the British Army and then by UNRRA (United Nations Relief and Rehabilitation Administration). In 1969 it was used a regional state specialist clinic for psychiatry and neurology. The hospital closed in 1978.

== Present day ==
As of 1985, after extensive restoration, the building became the headquarters of the cultural departments of the Rhineland Regional Council, the Rhineland Archive and Museum Office with restoration workshops, and the Rhineland publishing and operating company.

The Rheinisches Amt für Denkmalpflege ("Rhenish Department for the Care of Historic Monuments") hosts various events such as concerts, fine arts exhibitions, symposiums, and theatre performances on the abbey grounds.

== Burials at the Abbey ==
- Matilda of Germany, Countess Palatine of Lotharingia
