= Hezzelin I =

Hezzelin I (also called Hezilo or Hermann), Count in Zülpichgau (died 1033), son of count palatine Hermann I of Lotharingia.

He married a daughter of Duke Conrad I of Carinthia and had:

- Heinrich I Count Palatine of Lotharingia from 1045 until 1060;
- Herman, Count of Avelgau
- Conrad III of Zulpichgau, Duke of Carinthia from 1056 until 1061 (died 1061).

== Sources ==
- Jackman, Donald C. (2009). Hochstaden: Public Succession in Ripuaria of the High Middle Ages. Editions Enplage.
- Jackman, Donald C. (2012). The Kleeberg Fragment of the Gleiberg County. Editions Enplage.
