= Brauweiler =

Locality in Pulheim, North Rhine-Westphalia, Germany

Coordinates: 50°58′N 6°47′E

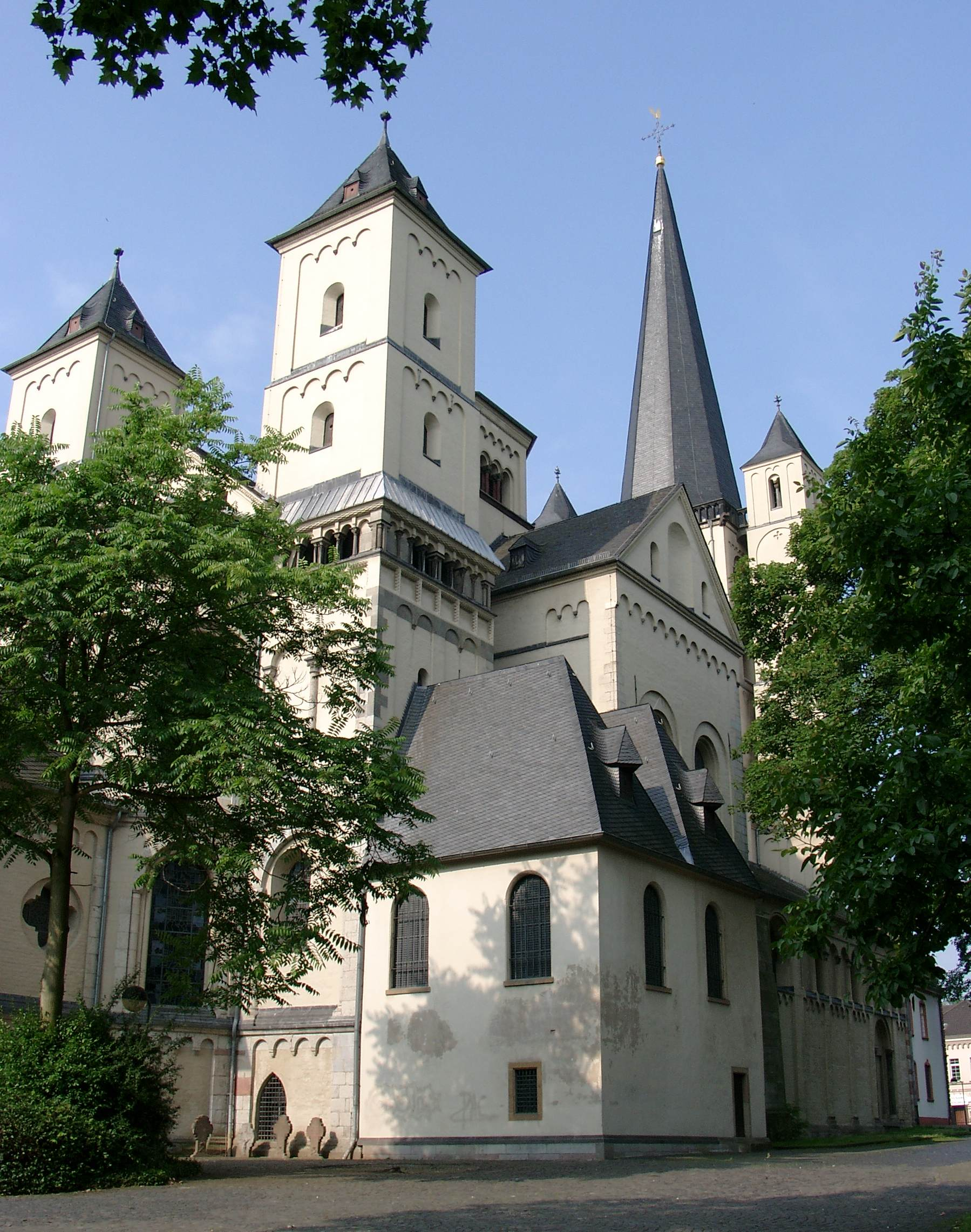
St. Nikolaus, church of the former Brauweiler Abbey

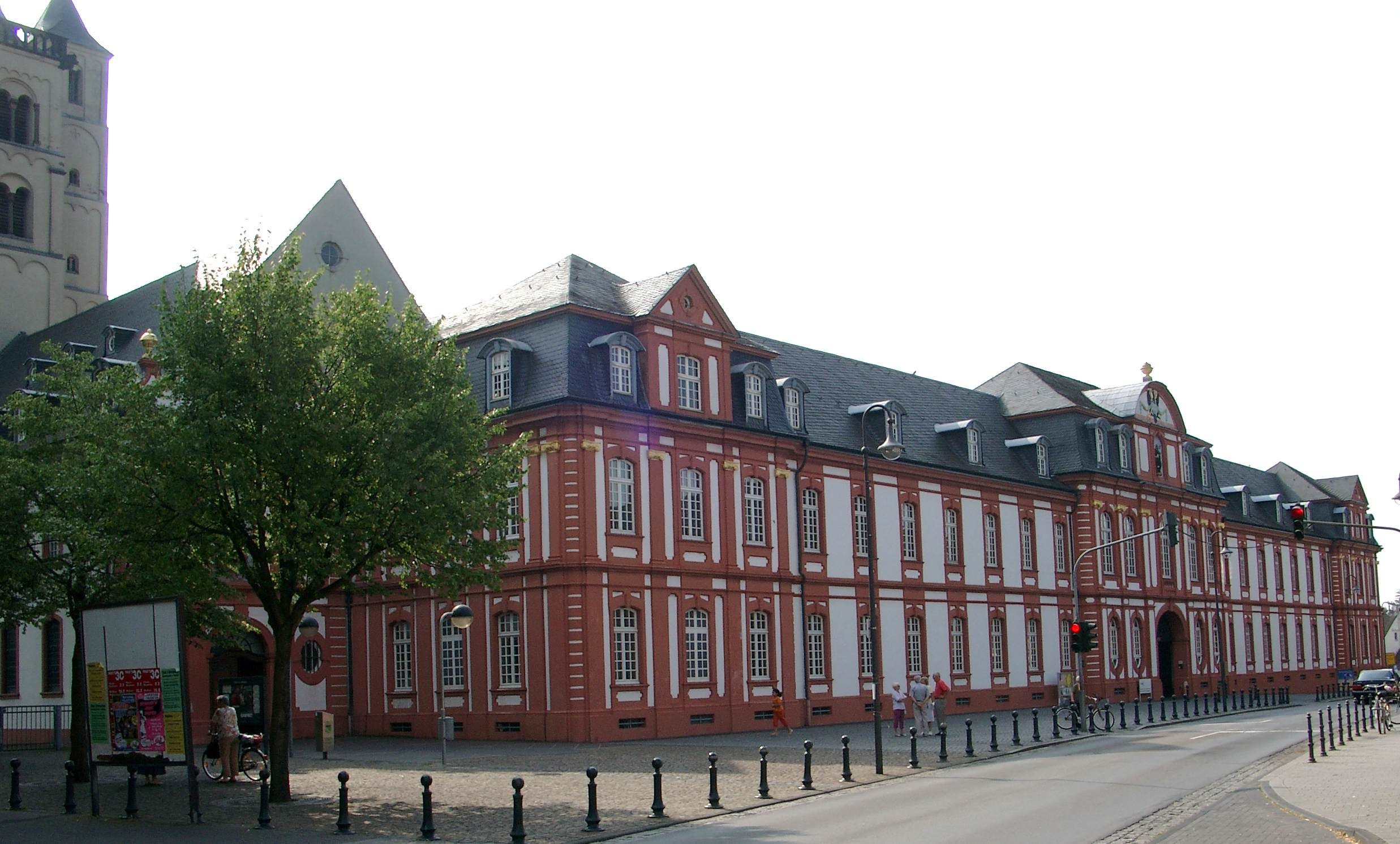
Brauweiler Abbey

Brauweiler is a part of Pulheim, west of Cologne, North Rhine-Westphalia in Germany.

The former Benedictine abbey, Brauweiler Abbey, founded 1024, is used today by the Rhein Department for the Care of Historic Monuments.

In Brauweiler in the 1920s a large power transmission station was built, which supplied up to 380 kV. It was also the starting point of the north south powerline. Also in the area of this transformer station is the main control room of the RWE, from which nearly the entire high-voltage transmission system of the RWE AG is supervised by remote control. This control is also used to coordinate the power transmission in continental Europe.

== See also ==
- Brauweiler Abbey
