= Matilda of Germany, Countess Palatine of Lotharingia =

Matilda
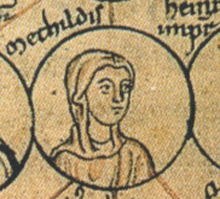

Countess Palatine of Lotharingia
- Born: Summer 979
- Died: November 1025
- Burial: Brauweiler Abbey, North Rhine-Westphalia
- Spouse: Ezzo, Count Palatine of Lotharingia
- Issue More...: Liudolf of Lotharingia; Otto II, Duke of Swabia; Hermann II, Archbishop of Cologne; Richeza, Queen of Poland
- Dynasty: Ottonian
- Father: Otto II, Holy Roman Emperor
- Mother: Theophanu

Matilda (Summer 979 – November 1025), was a member of the Ottonian dynasty, Countess Palatine of Lotharingia by marriage to Ezzo, Count Palatine of Lotharingia.

== Early life ==
Matilda was the third daughter of Emperor Otto II and Empress Theophanu. Shortly after her birth, Matilda was sent to Essen Abbey, where her paternal aunt Matilda was abbess. Matilda was educated here. It was presumed that Matilda would stay in the abbey and become an abbess like her older sisters Adelaide and Sophia.

== Countess Palatine of Lotharingia ==
Matilda lived a different life from her two sisters; she was to marry Ezzo, Count Palatine of Lotharingia. According to the historian Thietmar of Merseburg, Matilda's brother, Emperor Otto III, did not like the idea of Matilda marrying at first. The family gave the couple large gifts to secure an adequate standard of living. Empress Theophanu consented to the marriage. Ezzo then took Matilda out of the abbey where she had lived. However, Abbess Matilda vainly refused to surrender the girl. Later romantic embellishments even claimed Ezzo had previously been secretly in love with the young Matilda.

It is likely that this marriage was meant to ensure the power of Otto III. The family had extensive estates in the Lower Rhine and Mosel. Ezzo's mother came from the house of the dukes of Swabia and so Ezzo laid claims to these lands. Matilda received them out of Ottonian possessions and gave them to her husband.

== Issue ==
Ezzo and Matilda had ten children:

- Liudolf (c. 1000 – 10 April 1031), Count of Zutphen
- Otto I (died 1047), Count Palatine of Lotharingia and later Duke of Swabia as Otto II
- Hermann II (995–1056), Archbishop of Cologne
- Theophanu (died 1056), Abbess of Essen and Gerresheim
- Richeza (died 21 March 1063), Queen of Poland, married Mieszko II Lambert of Poland
- Adelheid (died c. 1030), Abbess of Nijvel (Nivelles)
- Heylwig, Abbess of Neuss
- Mathilde, Abbess of Dietkirchen and Vilich
- Sophie, Abbess of St. Maria, Mainz
- Ida (died 1060), Abbess of Cologne and Gandersheim Abbey (founded in 852 by her ancestor Liudolf, Duke of Saxony).

== Death ==
Matilda apparently died unexpectedly during a visit to Ezzo's brother Hermann in Echtz, while Ezzo was held in Aachen, at a meeting of the nobility of Lorraine. Matilda was buried at Brauweiler Abbey.

== Sources ==
- Wilson, Peter H. (2016). Heart of Europe. Harvard University Press. ISBN 9780674058095.
