= Theophanu =

Holy Roman Empress from 973 to 983

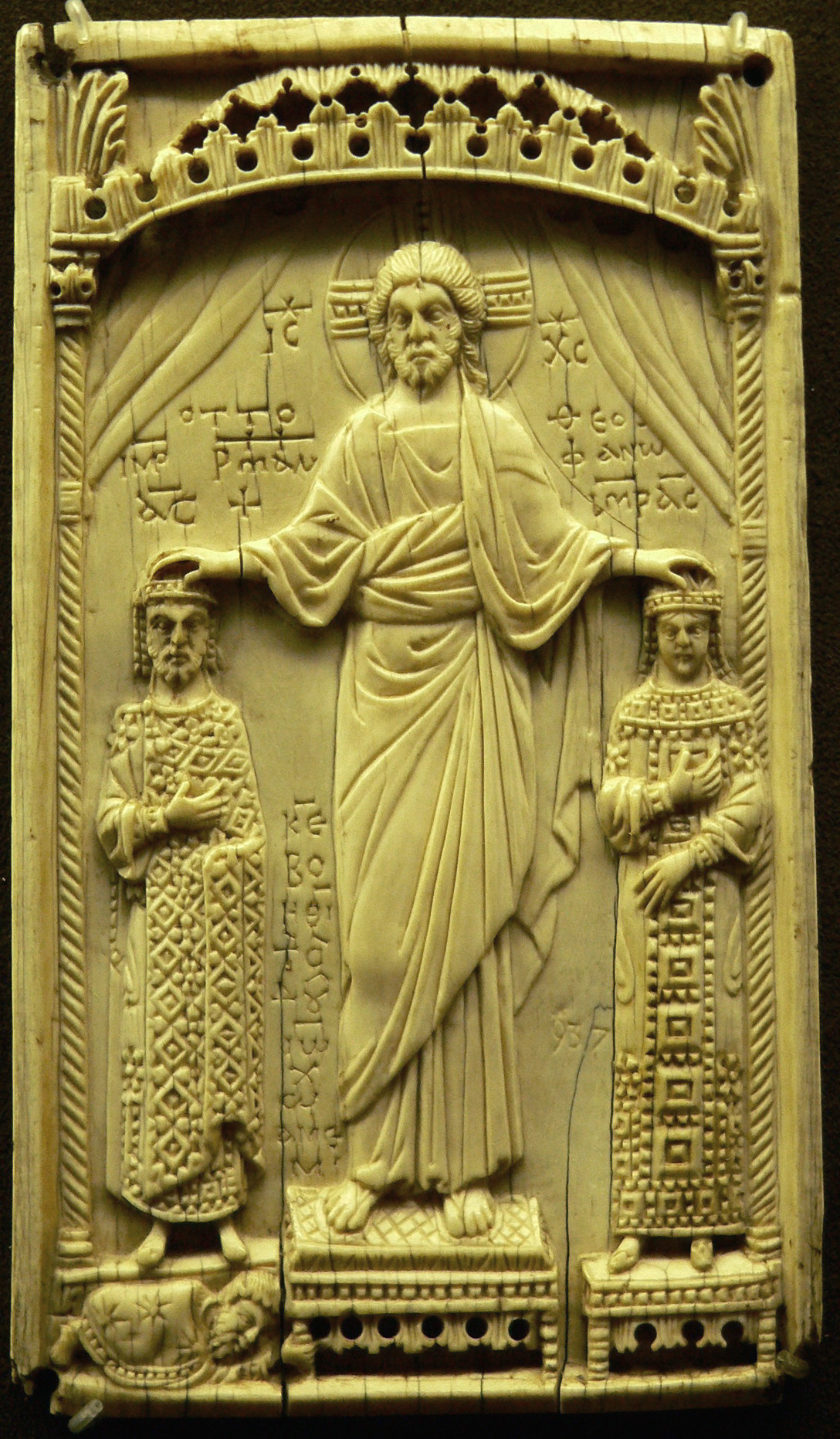
- Christ blessing Otto (left) and Theophano (right), ivory book cover, dated 982/3, Musée de Cluny, Paris.

Holy Roman Empress
- Tenure: 7 May 973 – 7 December 983

Queen consort of Germany
- Tenure: 14 April 972 – 7 December 983
- Coronation: 14 April 972
- Born: c. 955; Constantinople (modern-day Istanbul, Turkey)
- Died: 15 June 991; Nijmegen (modern-day Netherlands)
- Spouse: Otto II, Holy Roman Emperor (m. 972; died 983)
- Issue details: Adelaide I, Abbess of Quedlinburg; Sophia I, Abbess of Gandersheim; Mathilde, Countess Palatine of Lorraine; Otto III, Holy Roman Emperor
- Father: Constantine Skleros
- Mother: Sophia Phokaina
- Religion: Chalcedonian Christianity

Theophanu Skleraina (German pronunciation: [te.o.fa.ˈnuː]; also Theophania, Theophana, Theophane or Theophano; Greek: Θεοφανώ, romanized: Theofanó; c. 955 – 15 June 991) was empress of the Holy Roman Empire by marriage to Emperor Otto II, and regent of the Empire during the minority of their son, Emperor Otto III, from 983 until her death in 991. She was the niece of the Byzantine Emperor John I Tzimiskes. Theophanu was known to be a forceful and capable ruler, and her status in the history of the Empire was in many ways exceptional. Her official titles contained 'consors imperii', which her mother-in-law Adelaide of Italy already received and 'comperatrix augusta', which was modeled after the Byzantine position of the empress to ensure succession and regencies.

== Early life ==
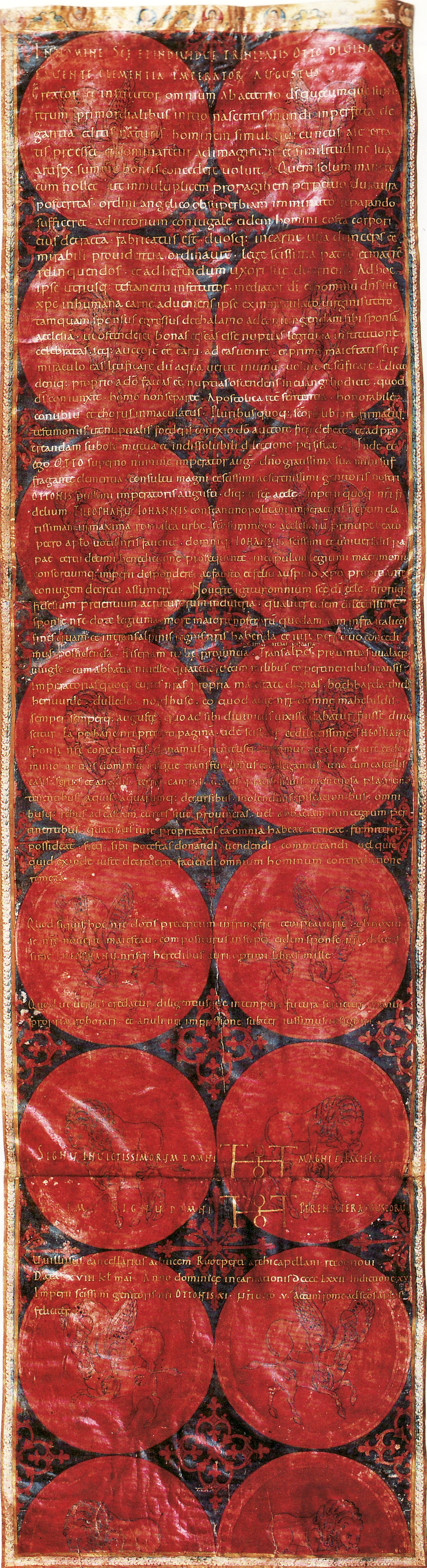
Marriage Charter of Empress Theophanu, State Archive, Wolfenbüttel.

According to the marriage certificate issued on 14 April 972 Theophanu is identified as the neptis (niece or granddaughter) of Emperor John I Tzimiskes (925–976, reigned 969–976) who was of Armenian and Byzantine Greek descent. She was of distinguished noble heritage: the Vita Mahthildis identifies her as augusti de palatio and the Annales Magdeburgenses describe her as Grecam illustrem imperatoriae stirpi proximam, ingenio facundam. Recent research tends to concur that she was most probably the daughter of Tzimiskes' brother-in-law (from his first marriage) Constantine Skleros (c. 920–989), brother of Bardas Skleros and great-grandnephew of Basil I, and cousin Sophia Phokas, the daughter of Kouropalatēs Leo Phokas, brother of Emperor Nikephoros II (c. 912–969).

== Marriage ==
Theophanu was not born in the purple as the Ottonians would have preferred. The Saxon chronicler Bishop Thietmar of Merseburg writes that the Ottonian preference was for Anna Porphyrogenita, a daughter of late Emperor Romanos II. Theophanu's uncle John I Tzimiskes had overthrown his predecessor Nikephoros II Phokas in 969. Theophanu was escorted back to Rome for her wedding by a delegation of German and Italian churchmen and nobles. When the Ottonian court discovered Theophanu was not a scion of the Macedonian dynasty, as had been assumed, Emperor Otto I was told by some to send Theophanu away. His advisors believed that Theophanu's relation to the usurper John Tzimiskes would invalidate the marriage as a confirmation of Otto I as Holy Roman Emperor. He was persuaded to allow her to stay when it was pointed out that John Tzimiskes had wed Theodora, a member of the Macedonian dynasty and sister to Emperor Romanos II. John was therefore a Macedonian, by marriage if not by birth. Otto I must have been convinced, because Theophanu and Otto's heir, Otto II, were married on 14 April 972.

A reference by the Pope to Emperor Nikephoros II as "Emperor of the Greeks" in a letter while Otto's ambassador, Bishop Liutprand of Cremona, was at the Byzantine court, had destroyed the first round of marriage negotiations. With the ascension of John I Tzimiskes, who had not been personally referred to other than as Roman Emperor, the treaty negotiations were able to resume. However, not until a third delegation led by Archbishop Gero of Cologne arrived in Constantinople, were they successfully completed. After the marriage negotiations completed, Theophanu and Otto II were married by Pope John XIII in April 972 and she was crowned as Holy Roman Empress the same day in Rome. According to Karl Leysers' book Communications and Power in Medieval Europe: Carolingian and Ottonian, Otto I's choice was not "to be searched for in the parlance of high politics" as his decision was ultimately made on the basis of securing his dynasty with the birth of the next Ottonian emperor.

According to Laura Wangerin, her father-in-law Otto the Great played an instrumental role in establishing her position as a future ruler. But despite his support, she met a lot of opposition and envy due to her foreign origins and education. After his death in 973, she lost her greatest support at court.

== Empress ==
Otto II succeeded his father on 8 May 973. Theophanu accompanied her husband on all his journeys, and she is mentioned in approximately one quarter of the emperor's formal documents – evidence of her privileged position, influence and interest in affairs of the empire. It is known that she was frequently at odds with her mother-in-law, Adelaide of Italy. The young couple and Adelaide collided with each other in several matters, including Adelaide's early association with Henry the Quarrelsome. According to Abbot Odilo of Cluny, Adelaide was very happy when "that Greek woman" died.

Nevertheless, the imperial couple were able to secure the trust of their allies at the 973 Reichstag in Worms, after which they traveled the country together, searching for new alliances and strengthening old ties. The young Theophanu showed diplomatic skills and displayed herself as an active partner in political negotiations.

The Benedictine chronicler Alpert of Metz describes Theophanu as being an unpleasant and chattery woman. Theophanu was also criticized for having introduced new luxurious garments and jewelry into France and Germany. The theologian Peter Damian even asserts that Theophanu had a love affair with John Philagathos, a Greek monk who briefly reigned as Antipope John XVI.

Otto II died suddenly on 7 December 983 at the age of 28, probably from malaria. His three-year-old son, Otto III, had already been appointed King of the Romans during a diet held on Pentecost of that year at Verona. At Christmas, Theophanu had him crowned by the Mainz archbishop Willigis at Aachen Cathedral, with herself ruling as Empress Regent on his behalf. Upon the death of Emperor Otto II, Bishop Folcmar of Utrecht released his cousin, the Bavarian duke Henry the Quarrelsome from custody. Duke Henry allied with Archbishop Warin of Cologne and seized his nephew Otto III in spring 984, while Theophanu was still in Italy in the royal palace of Pavia. Nevertheless he was forced to surrender the child to his mother, who was backed by Archbishop Willigis of Mainz and Bishop Hildebald of Worms.

== Regency ==
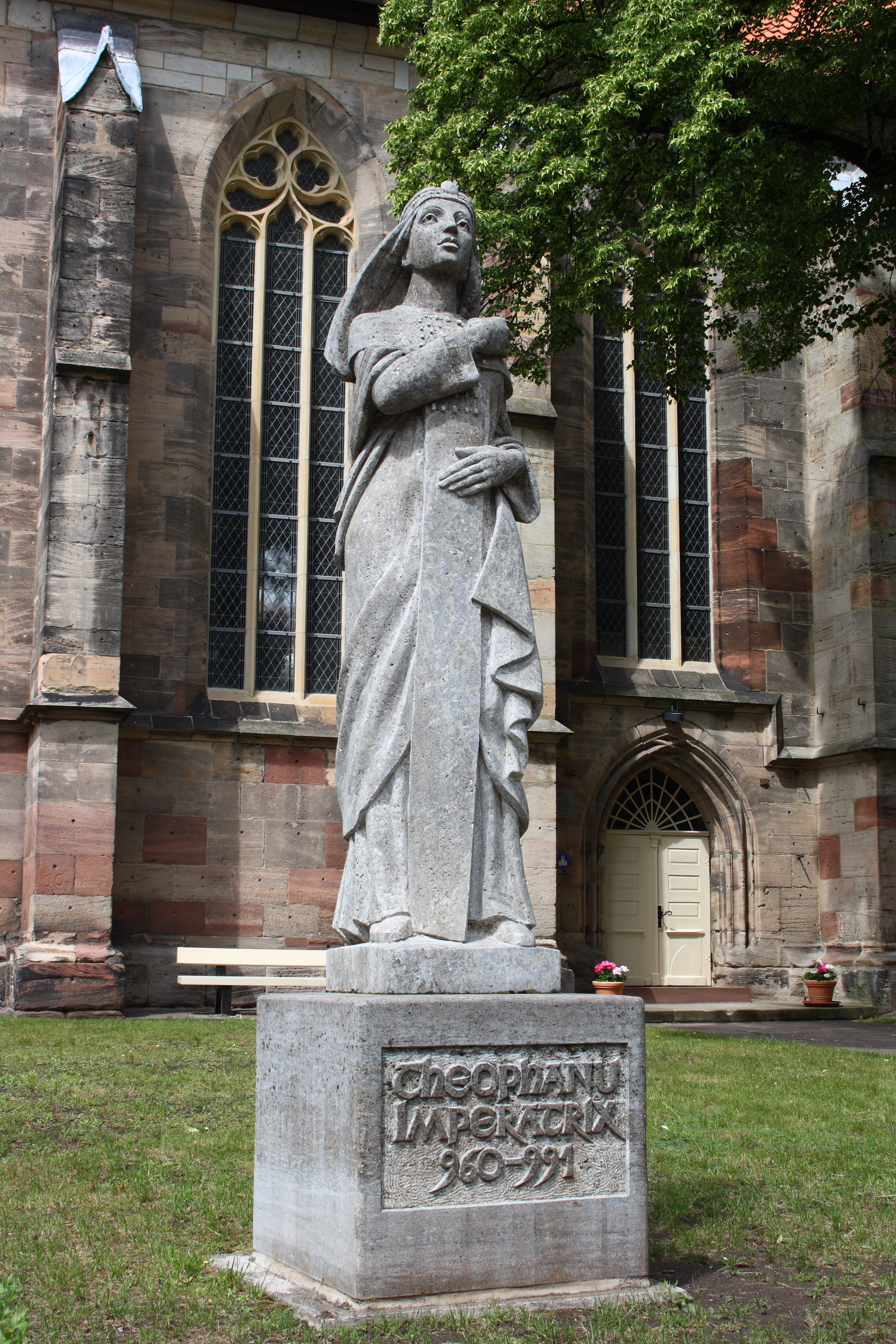
Modern statue at St Dionysius Church, Eschwege.

=== Consolidation of power ===
Theophanu ruled the Holy Roman Empire as regent for a span of five years, from May 985 to her death in 991, despite early opposition by the Ottonian court. In fact, many queens in the tenth century, on an account of male rulers dying early deaths, found themselves in power, creating an age of greater diversity. Her power as queen, empress and regent was based on the basis of Saxon tradition (which assigned the women an equal role in the family), Byzantine influence (which presented a model of a female counterpart to the emperor) and her mother-in-law Adelaide's legacy. Theophanu and her mother-in-law, Adelaide, are known during the empress' regency to have butted heads frequently—Adelaide of Italy is even quoted as referring to her as "that Greek empress." However, according to historian and author Simon Maclean, Theophanu's rivalry with her mother-in-law is overstated. Theophanu's "Greekness" was not an overall issue. Moreover, there was a grand fascination with the culture surrounding Byzantine court in the west that slighted most criticisms to her Greek origin.

Theophanu did not remain merely as an image of the Ottonian empire, but as an influence within the Holy Roman Empire. She intervened within the governing of the empire a total of seventy-six times during the reign of her husband Otto II—perhaps a foreshadowing of her regency. Her first act as regent was in securing her son, Otto III, as the heir to the Holy Roman Empire. Theophanu also placed her daughters in power by giving them high positions in influential nunneries all around the Ottonian-ruled west, securing power for all her children. She welcomed ambassadors, declaring herself "imperator" or "imperatrix", as did her relative contemporary Irene of Athens, who signed her documents as "basileus" rather than "basilissa"; the starting date for her reign being 972, the year of her marriage to the late Otto II. Theophanu's regency is a time of considerable peace, as the years 985-991 passed without major crises.

=== Policy ===
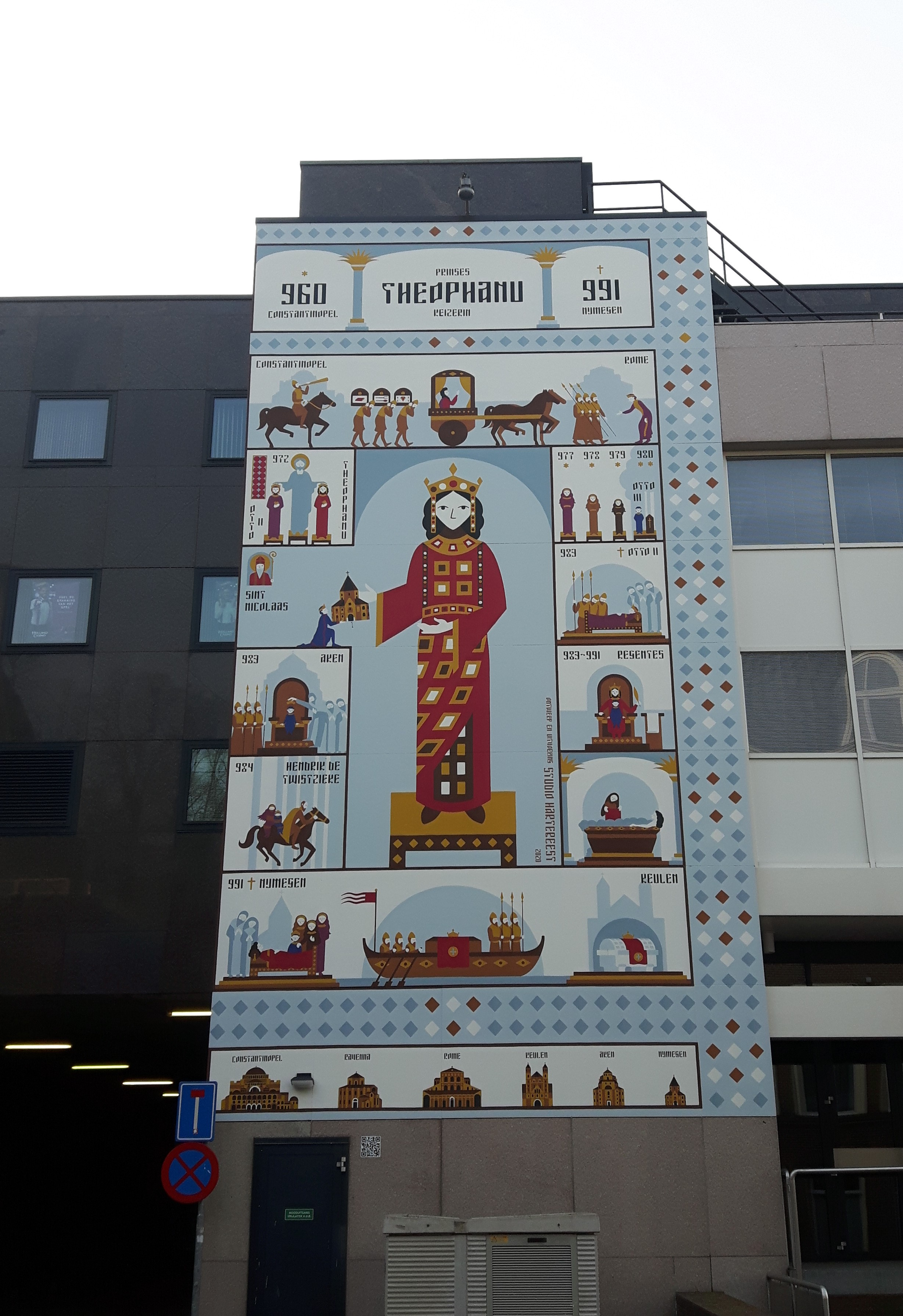
Theophanu, mural, Nijmegen

In the North, she made a treaty with King Eric the Victorious, which promoted an alliance against Slavic tribes as well as reinforced trade and cultural connections. In the East, she sent envoys to Vladimir the Great of Kiev, who was married to the Byzantine princess Anna, sister of Emperor Basil II. Economou notes that, "Theophano had in mind a 'family of kings,' in parallel to Byzantine tradition: The emperor was the 'father' of other kings, who were his 'sons' and 'friends' (amici) in a kind of family hierarchy. She also adopted the Byzantine model of relations between the emperor and patriarch in her relations to the pope (Ostrogorsky 1956b). The 'family' of the western empire included the duke of Poland, Mieszko I, Bohemia and Hungary". Her model of imperial rulership, influenced by Byzantine and Ancient Roman ideas, was taken over by Otto II and especially Otto III who developed it further (although his abrupt death at a very young age prevented it from becoming an established foundation for the future).

According to historian Gerd Althoff, Theophanu's prowess in diplomacy could be exaggerated. Royal charters present evidence that magnates were at the core of governing the empire. Althoff highlights this as unusual, since kings or emperors in the middle ages rarely shared such a large beacon of power with nobility.

Theophanu introduced Byzantine protocol, "which influenced dress, crowns and jewelry, eating habits and utensils, even furniture". Her retinue of scholars brought to the empire Byzantine lawyers' procedures. The cult of Saint Nicholas in the empire traces its origin from her too.

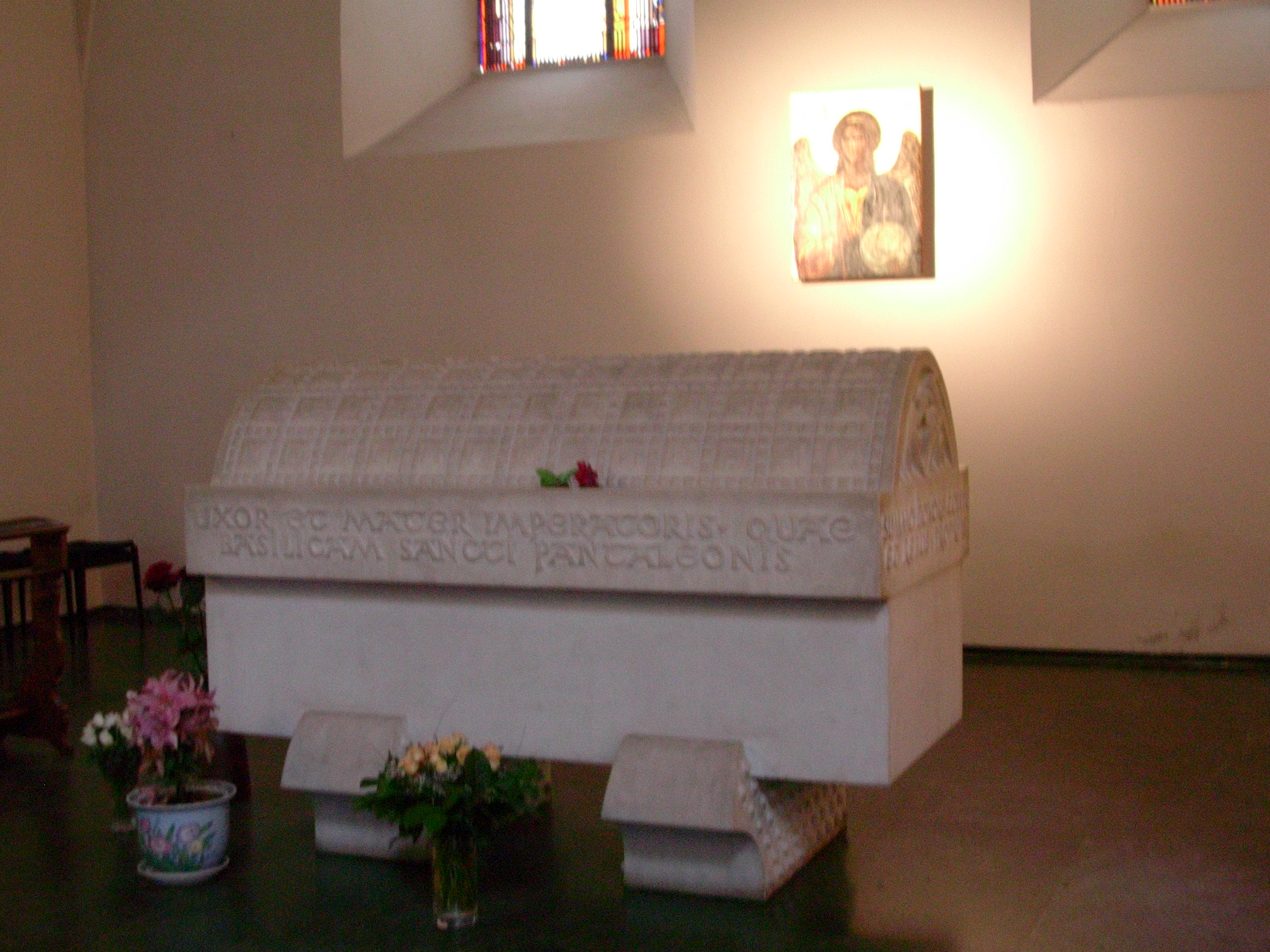
Sarcophagus of Empress Theophanu, St. Pantaleon, Cologne.

As she and her husband and her son promoted trade in the Empire, Magdeburg and its traders were granted various privileges. Historical evidences show strong commercial activities in regions from Lüneburg to Halle. There are traces of Byzantine, Slavic as well as Arab traders.

As with many Byzantine monarchs, Theophanu preferred diplomacy, but she did wage wars when necessary and accepted personal risk. She carried out at least one (successful) military expedition herself, in 987, when she marched with an imperial army to assist the Prince-Bishop Notker of Liège against Odo I, Count of Blois.

Due to illness beginning in 988, Theophanu eventually died at Nijmegen and was buried in the Church of St. Pantaleon near her wittum in Cologne in 991. The chronicler Thietmar eulogized her as follows: "Though [Theophanu] was of the weak sex she possessed moderation, trustworthiness, and good manners. In this way she protected with male vigilance the royal power for her son, friendly with all those who were honest, but with terrifying superiority against rebels."

Because Otto III was still a child, his grandmother Adelaide of Italy took over the regency until Otto III became old enough to rule on his own.

== Historiography and depictions in arts ==
Theophanu has always attracted considerable controversy from chroniclers and historiographers. While praised by Thietmar of Merseburg and Bruno of Querfurt, she was also criticized by some other scholars, notably Odilo of Cluny, the hagiographer of her mother-in-law and rival Adelaide. Odilo even blamed her for the failed Italian expedition of Otto II. Her modern historiographers are similarly divided, although Knut Görich sees the general trend as leaning towards the positive. Some see her as passive, reactive and conservative while the others see her as extremely future-oriented and energetic; still others like Jestice opine that current evidences are not enough to definitely conclude that Theophanu and the other prominent female Ottonian rulers were extraordinarily talented as individuals or not but it is clear that the Ottonian society (which basically treated women and men as equals, except in physical prowess) allowed women the chance to succeed. Her personal role or non-role in the contact or merging between the Macedonian Renaissance and Ottonian Renaissance inspires a lot of debate as well.

== Commemoration ==
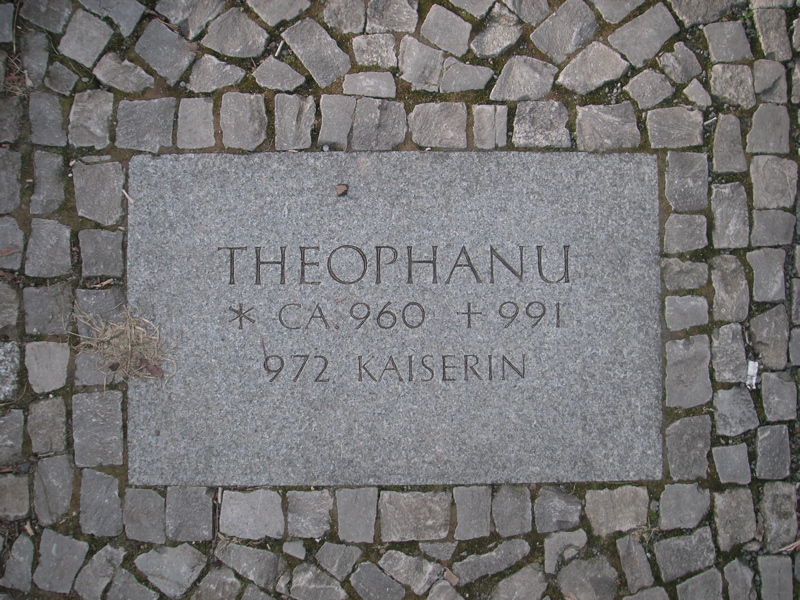
Theophanu's name on the Weg der Ottonen, Magdeburg

The Empress Theophano Prize, awarded by the Empress Theophano Foundation based in Thessaloniki, "rewards individuals or organisations who make an outstanding contribution to bridging Europe's historic diversities."

On the occasion of the millennial commemoration of her death, multiple events in Germany and the Netherlands were organized.

== Issue ==
- Adelaide I, Abbess of Quedlinburg and Gandersheim, born 973/974, died 1045.
- Sophia I, Abbess of Gandersheim and Essen, born October 975, died 1039.
- Mathilde, born summer 978, died 1025; who married Ezzo, count palatine of Lotharingia.
- Otto III, Holy Roman Emperor, born end June/early July 980.
- A daughter, a twin to Otto, who died before October 8, 980.

== Sources ==
- Davids, Adelbert. The Empress Theophano: Byzantium and the West at the turn of the first millennium, 2002. ISBN 0-521-52467-9
- Hlawitschka, Eduard, Die Ahnen der hochmitteralterlichen deutschen Konige, Kaiser und ihrer Gemahlinnen, Ein kommentiertes Tafelwerk, Band I: 911–1137, Teil 2, Hanover 2006. ISBN 978-3-7752-1132-1
- Hans K. Schulze, Die Heiratsurkunde der Kaiserin Theophanu, Hanover 2007 ISBN 978-3-7752-6124-1
- Schwab, Sandra (2009). Theophanu: eine oströmische Prinzessin als weströmische Kaiserin (in German). GRIN Verlag. ISBN 978-3-640-27041-5.
- Settipani, Christian, Continuité des élites à Byzance durant les siècles obscurs. Les princes caucasiens et l'Empire du VI^{e} au IX^{e} siècle, Boccard, Paris 2006. ISBN 978-2-7018-0226-8
- Sotiriades, Moses, "Theophanu, die Prinzessin aus Ost-Rom" in: von Steinitz, Peter (Editor), Theophanu, Regierende Kaiserin des Westreichs, Freundeskreis St. Pantaleon 2000. ISBN 3980519716
- Paul Collins. The Birth of the West: Rome, Germany, France, and the creation of Europe in the tenth century. Public Affairs, 2013. ISBN 978-1-61039-013-2
- Althoff, Gerd. ' 'Otto III' ', trans. Phyllis G. Jestice, 2003. ISBN 978-0-271-02401-1

Royal titles
Preceded by Adelaide of Italy	Queen consort of Germany; 972–983	Succeeded by Cunigunde of Luxembourg
Preceded by Adelaide of Italy	Empress consort of the Holy Roman Empire; 973–983	Succeeded by Cunigunde of Luxembourg
