= Graeme Dunphy =

British professor

Graeme Dunphy (born 1961) is a British medievalist.

== Biography ==
Dunphy was born in Glasgow in 1961. He studied German at the University of Stirling between 1979 and 1984, and Hebrew and the Old Testament at the University of St Andrews between 1984 and 1987. He completed his PhD in medieval German literature in 1998.

Dunphy is a professor of translation at the University of Applied Sciences Würzburg-Schweinfurt. He was formerly a lecturer in English at the University of Regensburg from 1993 till 2013, and also taught at the Open University and the University of London via the open access programme.

His work focuses primarily on German world chronicles, such as the Annolied, Kaiserchronik, Jans der Enikel, Christherre-Chronik, and Rudolf von Ems, among others. He has also worked on German Baroque literature (Martin Opitz and Melchior Goldast) and modern migrant literature (Meera Syal, Rafik Schami, Sevtap Baycılı, Halil Gür, Şinasi Dikmen, and Django Asül).

As of 2020, Dunphy served as the president of the Medieval Chronicle Society. He is also the editor of the Encyclopedia of the Medieval Chronicle and The Year's Work in Modern Language Studies.

== Select bibliography ==
- Daz was ein michel wunder: The Presentation of Old Testament Material in Jans Enikel's Weltchronik, Göppinger Arbeiten zur Germanistik 650, Göppingen: Kümmerle, 1998. [350 pages]. ISBN 978-3-87452-896-2
- History as Literature: German World Chronicles of the Thirteenth Century in Verse. Excerpts from: Rudolf von Ems, Weltchronik; The Christherre-Chronik; Jans Enikel, Weltchronik, Medieval Texts in Bilingual Editions vol. 3, Kalamazoo: University of Michigan Press, 2003. [186 pages]. ISBN 978-1-58044-042-4
- Opitz's Anno: The Middle High German Annolied in the 1639 Edition of Martin Opitz, Glasgow: Scottish Papers in Germanic Studies, 2003. [189 pages]. ISBN 978-0-907409-11-3

=== As editor ===
- Hybrid Humour: Comedy in Transcultural Perspectives (with Rainer Emig), Amsterdam & New York: Rodopi, 2010. [192 pages].
- The Encyclopedia of the Medieval Chronicle, 2 vols., Leiden: Brill, 2010. [1832 pages].

=== As translator ===
- A History of Youth by Michael Mitterauer.
