= Vita Annonis Minor =

German mediaeval manuscript

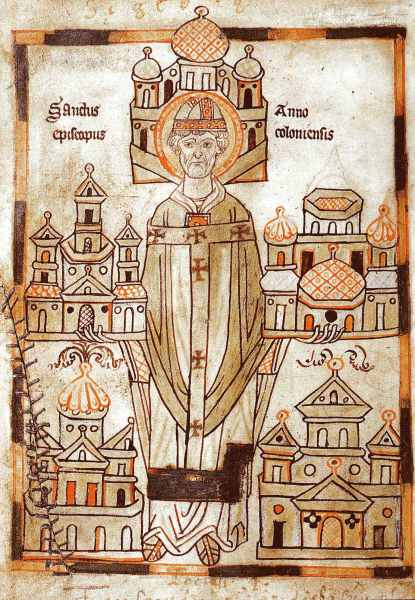
Miniature on the first page (fol. 1v) of the Vita Annonis Minor showing the standing figure of Saint Anno in bishop's robes with chasuble and pallium, surrounded by his religious foundations: in his hands the churches of St. Maria ad Gradus (1057) and St. Georg (1067) in Cologne, at his feet the Benedictine abbeys of Saalfeld in Thuringia (1063) and Grafschaft in Sauerland (1073), and at his head the Benedictine abbey of Siegburg (1064)

The Vita Annonis Minor is a hagiography of Saint Anno (archbishop of Cologne), No. 509 in the Bibliotheca Hagiographica Latina (BHL). The only extant mediaeval manuscript is in the Universitäts- und Landesbibliothek Darmstadt under reference Hs. 945.

== History ==
The manuscript was created in about 1180 in Michaelsberg Abbey, Siegburg. It later entered the possession of Grafschaft Abbey, either in 1186 or with the relics of Saint Anno in 1374. It was first documented in the mid-17th century by the Cologne clergyman and historian Aegidius Gelenius in a list of the manuscripts of Grafschaft. After secularisation and the transfer of the Duchy of Westphalia to the Landgraviate of Hessen-Darmstadt in 1804, the Vita Annonis came to the court library of Ludwig X in Darmstadt.

== Description ==
The manuscript is made of parchment and measures 19 × 14 centimetres. It comprises 68 pages. On the reverse of the first page is a depiction of Saint Anno with the caption Sanctus Anno episcopus coloniensis. The bishop is surrounded by five illustrations of churches and monasteries, probably those which he founded: the churches of St. Maria ad Gradus and St. Georg in Cologne, and the monasteries of Grafschaft Abbey in the Sauerland, Saalfeld Abbey on the Saale and Michaelsberg Abbey in Siegburg.

== Content ==
The Vita Annonis Minor is the more recent of two substantial mediaeval lives of Anno (the other is the Annolied). It was intended to support the canonisation of Anno (died 1075) and to be admitted as evidence in the process. Added to the description itself was the "Bamberger Nachtrag" ("Bamberg Addendum"), in which arguments against the canonisation were refuted, as well as an account of 1381 of the translation of Anno's relics to Grafschaft Abbey in 1374.

During the 15th century legends of further saints venerated at Grafschaft were entered on the manuscript's empty pages: Saint Felicity and her sons, and Saints Vitus, Modestus and Crescentia.

== Literature ==
- Géza Jászai (ed.), 1982: Monastisches Westfalen. Klöster und Stifte 800–1800 (pp. 570f., 5th improved edition). Landschaftsverband Westfalen-Lippe: Münster ISBN 3-88789-054-X
- Mauritius Mittler, 1975: Vita Annonis Minor = Die Jüngere Annovita (Siegburger Studien 10; Latin-German). Respublica-Verlag: Siegburg ISBN 3-87710-066-X
