= The Ill-Matched Couple =

Painting by Artemisia Gentileschi

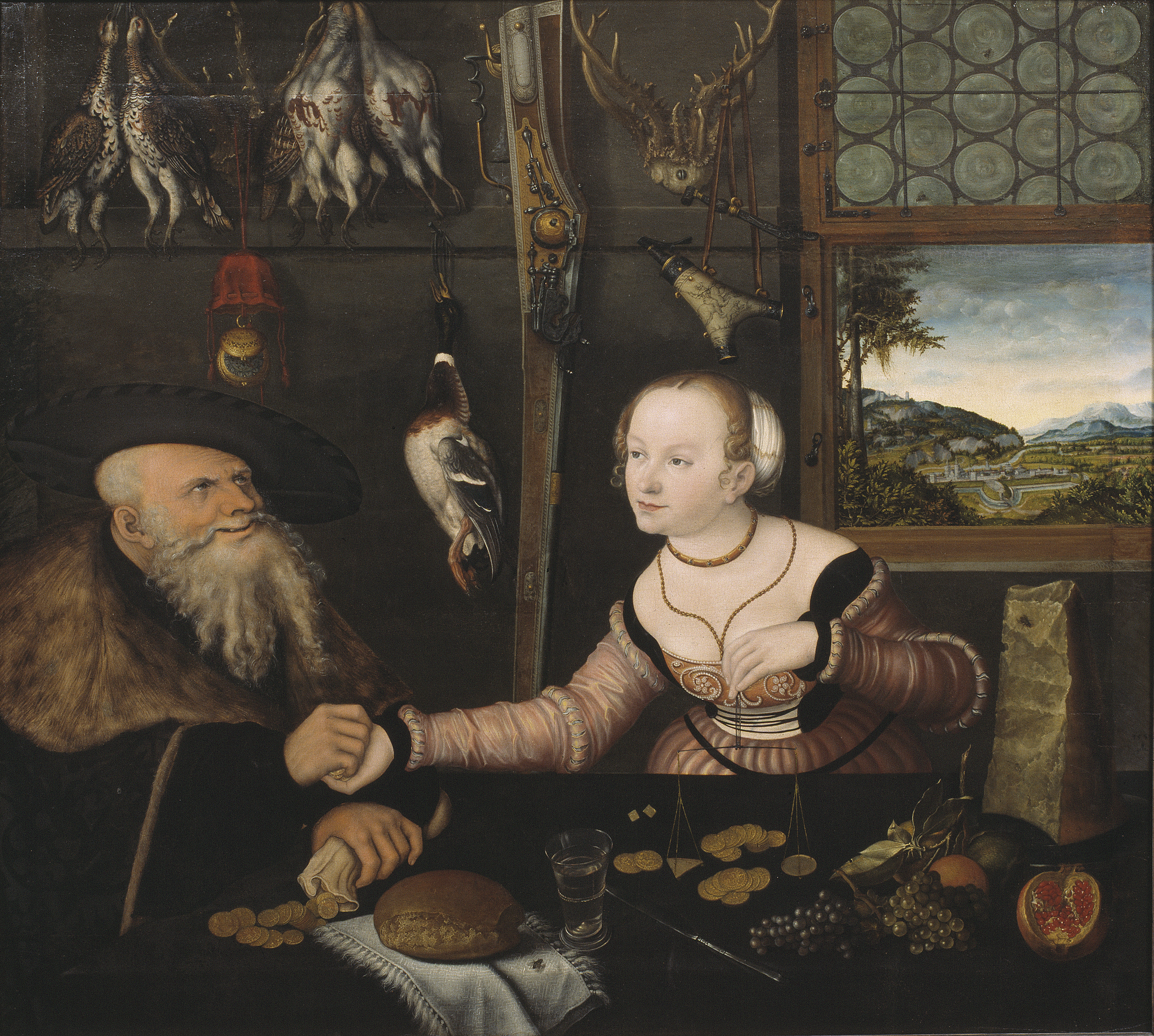
- Artist: Lucas Cranach the Elder
- Year: 1532
- Medium: Oil on panel
- Dimensions: 108 cm × 119 cm (43 in × 47 in)
- Location: Nationalmuseum, Stockholm

The Ill-Matched Couple is a 1532 oil painting by the German Renaissance painter Lucas Cranach the Elder. It was owned by Maximilian I of Bavaria until 1632, when Swedish troops captured it in a raid on Munich and thus is now in the Nationalmuseum, Stockholm.

It shows a wizened old man paying a young woman. She is depicted in a seductive neckline, which suggests he may be paying her for sexual services. The grapes and pomegranate in front of the couple symbolize desire and fertility. The scale in her hand alludes to the Last Judgment, when according to the Bible everyone will be judged according to their deeds. The subject was a popular one and Cranach frequently returned to it, occasionally reversing it to a young husband and an old wife.

== Similar works by Cranach ==
Image	Date	Technique	Dimensions (cm)	Collection
	1517	oil on panel	27,3 x 18	Museu Nacional d'Art de Catalunya, Barcelona
	1520–1522	oil on beechwood	37 x 31	Museum of Fine Arts, Budapest
	1522	oil on beechwood	84,5 x 63,6	Museum of Fine Arts, Budapest
	1528	oil on beechwood	76,8 x 56,8	Fränkische Galerie, Kronach
	c. 1525–1530	oil on beechwood	31,5 x 23	Hessisches Landesmuseum, Darmstadt
	c. 1525–1530	oil on limewood	87 x 60	Alte Pinakothek, Munich
	c. 1530	oil on beechwood	38.1 x 25,1	National Gallery, Prague
	c. 1530	oil on panel, later transferred to canvas	79 x 57,5	Musée des Beaux-Arts et d'Archéologie, Besançon
	c. 1530	oil on limewood	86,7 x 58,5	Germanisches Nationalmuseum, Nürnberg
	c. 1530	oil on beechwood	38,8 × 25,7	Museum Kunstpalast, Düsseldorf
	1531	oil on beechwood	51 x 36	Akademie der bildenden Künste, Vienna
	1537	tempera and oil on panel	75,5 x 48,5	National Museum, Warsaw
	c. 1530–1540	oil on limewood	19,5 × 14,5	Kunsthistorisches Museum, Vienna
	c. 1540	oil on panel	91 x 61	Veste Coburg, Coburg
	c. 1537–1545	oil on panel	85,7 x 59	National Museum of Georgia, Tbilisi
