= Annolied =

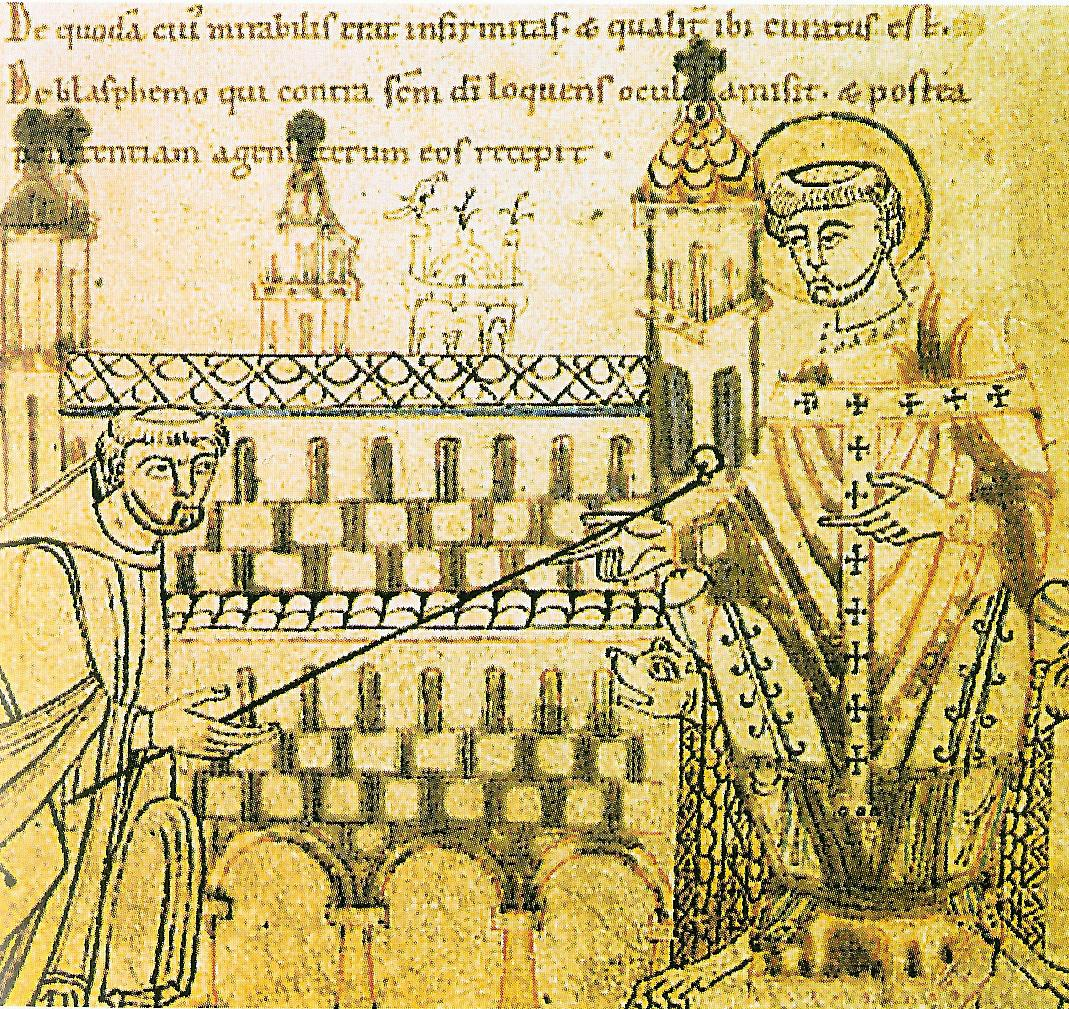
Anno II. (right) installs Erpho (left) as first abbot of Siegburg Abbey (from a 12th century manuscript).

The Annolied ("Song of Anno") is an Early Middle High German poem in praise of Archbishop Anno II of Cologne. Anno died in 1075 and the poem, probably written in the years immediately after his death, can be seen as part of a campaign for his canonisation, which was finally achieved in 1183. The modern title is taken from the heading given to it by Martin Opitz in his edition of the text: RHYTHMVS DE S. ANNONE COLONIENSI ARCHIEPISCOPO ("Song about Saint Anno, Archbishop of Cologne").

== Sources ==
There is no surviving manuscript of the Annolied. Knowledge of the poem comes mainly from the printed version published by Martin Opitz in 1639. Part of the poem had been published previously by Bonaventura Vulcanius in 1597, but this was only a short extract from the start of the work (strophes 2,1–5,4)). There are significant differences between the two printed versions: Vulcanius's is missing the prologue, has some additional lines, and differing strophe divisions. The two editors, therefore, must have drawn on different manuscripts, conventionally called *V and *O after their later editors.

However, the two manuscripts seem to be closely related and the codex probably combined the Annolied with Williram of Ebersberg's 'Expositio in Cantica Canticorum ("Commentary on the Song of Songs"): Opitz borrowed a Williram manuscript from his friend Michael Flandrin in Breslau, which may be the one held in the Breslau town library as R 347. The connection between the Annolied and a Williram manuscript in Breslau comes from a 15th century record which notes the presence in the Rhediger collection in the Breslau town library of a codex containing both the Annolied (Richmus de sancto Annone theutonische compositus) and Williram's text.

A 17th-century transcription by Franciscus Junius now in the Bodleian Library seems to be a copy of Opitz's edition rather than an independent source as was once believed.

== Dating ==
The principal point of reference for the dating is the mention of Mainz as the new place of coronation. This may refer to one of two coronations:

- Rudolf of Rheinfelden was crowned anti-king in opposition to Henry IV (who had been crowned in Aachen) in Mainz on 15 March 1077. Rudolf was succeeded by Hermann of Salm, who was crowned in Goslar in December 1081.
- Henry V was crowned in Mainz in January 1106.

Support for the earlier period 1077–81 comes from evidence that the Gesta Treverorum, which ends in 1106, drew on the Annolied. The Vita Annonis, a Latin life of Anno written in 1105, concentrates more on Anno's miracles, which suggests a later reworking of the story and an earlier date for the Annolied.

== Content ==
The poem consists of three parts: the religious or spiritual history of the world and its salvation, from the creation to the time of Anno II; the secular history of the world up to the foundation of the German cities (including the theory of the world empires derived from the vision of the Book of Daniel); and finally the "Vita Annonis", or the biography of Archbishop Anno II.

A recent interpretation sees this threefold structure in the context of the poet's remark in the prologue that in the beginning God created two worlds, one spiritual and one earthly, and then he mixed these to create the first human, who, being both, was a "third world". The poem then charts spiritual and secular history and finally shows the two culminating in the biography of the man who stands at the centrepoint of history. This is a remarkable and highly original historiographical approach.

Parts of the Annolied were incorporated into the later Middle High German Kaiserchronik and the two works are often considered together.

=== German origin story ===
The poem includes sections on four German peoples, the Swabians, Bavarians, Saxons and Franks, a typical medieval origo gentis story, telling in each case of their origins in the classical near east. The Annolied is the first text to give what later became quite a popular motif whereby the ancestors of the Bavarians migrated from Armenia.

== Excerpt ==
Duo sich Beirelant wider in virmaz,
Die mêrin Reginsburch her se bisaz,
Dâ vanter inne Helm unti brunigen,
Manigin helit guodin,
Die dere burg hû[h]din.
Wiliche Knechti dir wêrin,
Deist in heidnischin buochin mêri.
Dâ lisit man Noricus ensis,
Daz diudit ein suert Beierisch,
Wanti si woldin wizzen
Daz inge[m]ini baz nibizzin,
Die man dikke durch den helm slûg;
Demo liute was ie diz ellen gût.
Dere geslehte dare quam wîlin êre
Von Armenie der hêrin,
Dâ Nôê ûz der arkin gîng,
Dûr diz olizuî von der tûvin intfieng:
Iri zeichin noch du archa havit
Ûf den bergin Ararat.
Man sagit daz dar in halvin noch sîn
Die dir Diutischin sprecchin,
Ingegin India vili verro.
Peiere vûrin ie ziwîge gerno:
Den sigin den Cêsar an un gewan
Mit bluote mûster in geltan.

— ed. Max Roediger
Translation:

When Bavaria dared to rise against him,
he at once besieged the famous Regensburg.
Here he found helmet and byrnie,
and many bold heroes
who were defending their city.
The heathen books tell
what kind of warriors were there:
there we read "Noricus ensis",
which means, "a Bavarian sword",
for they believed
that no other blade had a better bite,
often slicing through a helmet.
This was always a brave people.
Their tribe came long ago
from the magnificent Armenia,
where Noah came out of the ark
when he received the olive twig from the dove.
The remains of the ark
are still to be found in the highlands of Ararat.
It is said that in those parts
there are still those who speak German,
far towards India.
The Bavarians always loved to go to war.
Caesar had to pay in blood
for his victory over them.

— Graeme Dunphy

== See also ==
- Middle High German literature
- Vita Annonis Minor

== Editions ==
- Vulcanius, B (1597). De literis et Lingua Getarum sive Gothorum. Leiden: Franciscus Raphelengius. pp. 61–64.
- Opitz, Martin (1639). Incerti Poetae Teutonici Rhythmus de Sancto Annone Colon. Archiepiscopo Martinus Opitius primus ex membrana veteri edidit et animadversionibus illustravit. Danzig.
- Kehrein, Joseph (1865). Das Annolied. Genauer Abdruck des optizischen Textes. Frankfurt am Main: Hamacher.
- Roediger, Max, ed. (1895). Das Annolied. Monumenta Germaniae Historica. Vol. Deutsche Chroniken I, 2. Hannover: Hahn. pp. 63–132. [Critical edition].
- Nellmann, Eberhard, ed. (1975). Das Annolied. Mittelhochdeutsch, Neuhochdeutsch. Stuttgart: Reclam. ISBN 978-3150014165.
- Schultz, James A., ed. (2000). Sovereignty and Salvation in the Vernacular 1050-1150. Medieval Texts in Bilingual Editions. Kalamazoo: The Consortium for the Teaching of the Middle Ages. pp. 56–103. [Study edition with English translation].
- Dunphy, Graeme, ed. (2003a). Opitz's Anno: The Middle High German Annolied in the 1639 Edition of Martin Opitz (PDF). Scottish Papers in Germanic Studies. Glasgow. [Diplomatic edition of the Annolied together with Opitz's critical apparatus, with English translation].

== Literature ==
- de Boor, Helmut (1971). Geschichte der deutschen Literatur. Vol. Band I. Von Karl dem Großen bis zum Beginn der höfischen Literatur 770-1170. München: C.H.Beck. pp. 151–153. ISBN 3-406-00703-1.
- Gentry, Francis G. (2001). "Annolied". In Jeep, John M. (ed.). Medieval Germany: An Encyclopedia. Abingdon, New York: Routledge. pp. 19–21. ISBN 9781138062658.
- Dunphy, Graeme (2003b). "Review of Stephan Müller, Vom Annolied zur Kaiserchronik". Modern Language Review. 98 (3): 755–757. doi:10.2307/3738357. JSTOR 3738357.
- Herweg, Mathias (2002). Ludwigslied, De Heinrico, Annolied: Die deutschen Zeitdichtungen des frühen Mittelalters im Spiegel ihrer wissenschaftlichen Rezeption und Erforschung. Wiesbaden: Reichert. ISBN 3895002682.
- Herweg, Mathias (2004). "Civitas permixta und dritte werilt: Die 'Programmstrophen' des Annolieds". Zeitschrift für deutsche Philologie: 1–18. doi:10.37307/j.1868-7806.2004.01.02.
- Herweg, Mathias (2010). "Annolied". Encyclopedia of the Medieval Chronicle. Vol. 1. Leiden: Brill. p. 97.
- Nellmann E (1977). "Annolied". In Ruh K, Keil G, Schröder W (eds.). Die deutsche Literatur des Mittelalters. Verfasserlexikon. Vol. 1. Berlin, New York: Walter De Gruyter. cols 366–371. ISBN 978-3-11-022248-7.
- Vollmann-Profe, Gisela (1986). Von den Anfängen bis zum hohen Mittelalter: Wiederbeginn volkssprachiger Schriftlichkeit im hohen Mittelalter (1050/60 - 1160/70). Geschichte der deutschen Literatur von den Anfängen bis zum Beginn der Neuzeit. Vol. 1/2. Tübingen: Niemeyer. pp. 36–39. ISBN 9783761083017.
