= Michaelsberg Abbey =

Michaelsberg or Michelsberg Abbey may refer to:

- Michaelsberg Abbey, Bamberg, Bavaria, Germany
- Michaelsberg Abbey, Siegburg, North Rhine-Westphalia, Germany
