= Saalfeld Abbey =

Monastery in Saalfeld, Germany

- Abtei Saalfeld
- Location within Thuringia Location within Germany
- Interactive map of Saalfeld Abbey

Monastery information
- Order: Benedictine
- Established: 11th century
- Disestablished: 1526

Site
- Coordinates: 50°39′09″N 11°21′31″E

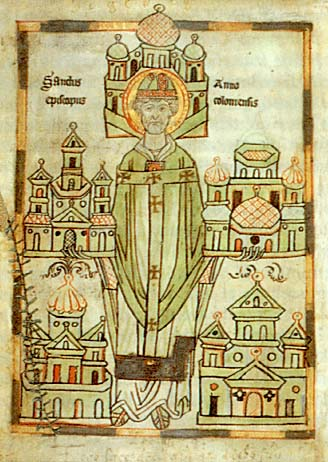
Anno II. in the Vita Annonis Minor (Saalfeld Abbey is bottom left)

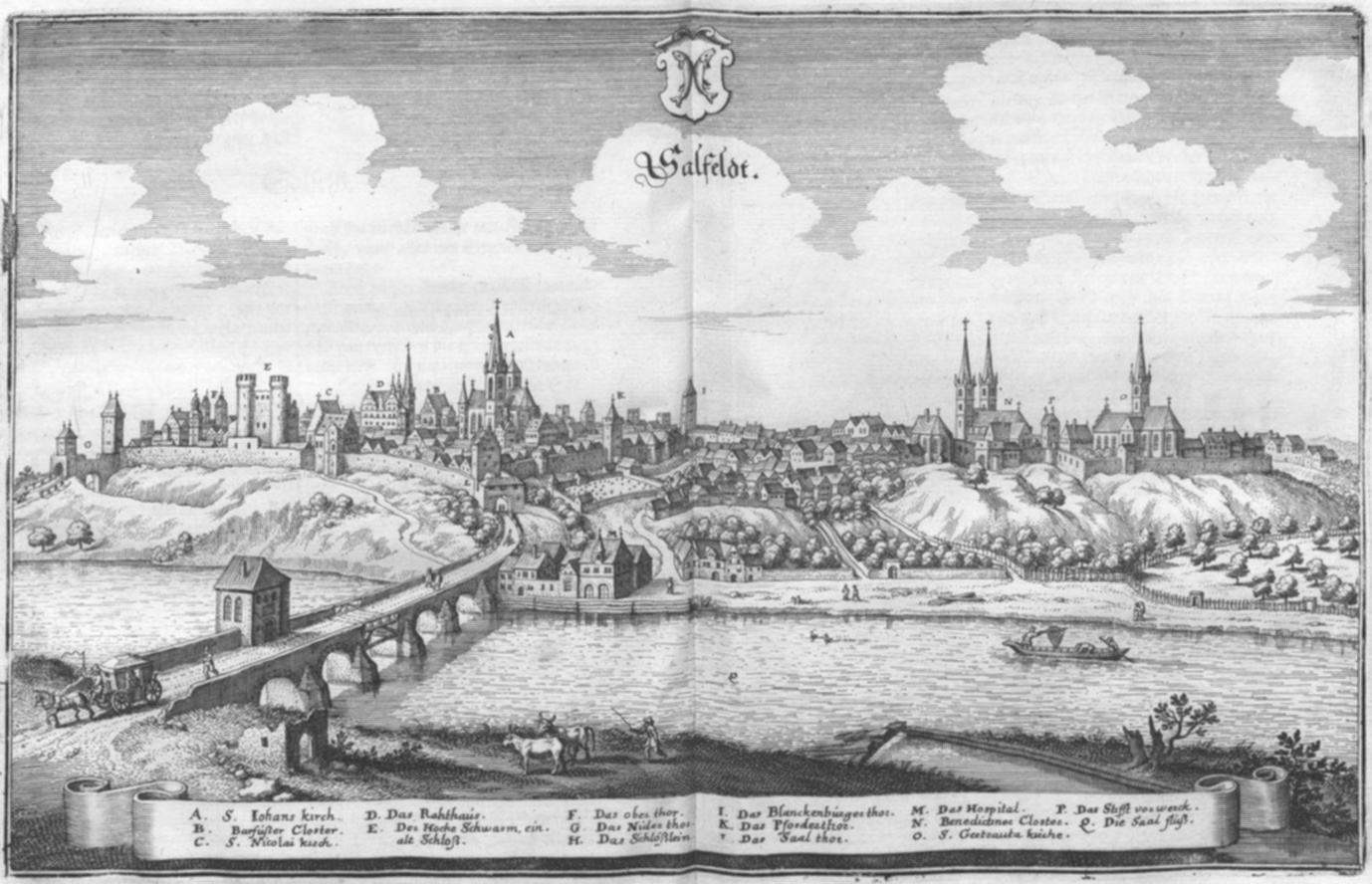
Saalfeld Abbey to the right in 1650

Saalfeld Abbey (German: Abtei Saalfeld, also Kloster Saalfeld) was an important medieval Benedictine monastery and Imperial Abbey in Saalfeld, Thuringia, Germany. As an imperial abbey, the monastery was under the direct auspices of the Holy Roman Emperor, and enjoyed a degree of sovereignty equivalent to a small micro state within the Empire. The monastery was founded in 1071 and existed until 1526, when it was secularised during the Reformation.

== History ==
The abbey was founded in 1071 (or 1074). The medieval historian Lambert of Hersfeld held that Anno II, Archbishop of Cologne, founded the Benedictine monastery of St. Peter and Paul in 1074 with religious independence and a bequest of land and assets. In 1124 Pope Honorius II confirmed the founding as did the Archbishop of Mainz the following year. Lambert's chronicles are the only written sources on the region's history for much of the High Middle Ages.

The monastery quickly became the ecclesiastical center of power in eastern Thuringia and was the starting point of the Christianization of the surrounding area. The town grew along with the rise of the monastic power. At its founding there was a hamlet, the fishing village Altsaalfeld, located nearby on the banks of the river. As the town grew the abbey was just outside the medieval town.

There is evidence that the monastery set up houses of prayer (Propsteien), at Coburg at the site of today's Veste Coburg (from 1075) and at Probstzella. The abbey at Saalfeld claimed the status of a direct imperial Fürstabtei and so was a secular principality within the territorial area of Thuringia. Emperor Maximilian I in 1497 endowed the abbey with the National Regalia.

The abbey was severely damaged during the German Peasants' War in 1525. During the Reformation in 1526 the monastery was secularised.

The last abbot Georg von Thüna sold the monastery to the Counts of Mansfeld. In 1532, it was resold to the House of Wettin. The surviving buildings were then used as offices for the Electoral administration.

Between 1677 and 1720 a ducal palace was built on the site of the former Benedictine abbey, whose buildings were, including the Romanesque basilica demolished in 1676. The abbey is today the site of Schloss Saalfeld.
