= Shadi Torbey =

Belgian opera singer and game designer (born 1976)

- Born: Shadi Torbey; 1976 (age 48–49); Siegburg, North Rhine-Westphalia, Germany
- Origin: Belgium
- Genres: Opera
- Occupations: Opera singer, game designer
- Instrument: Voice (bass)

Shadi Torbey (born 1976) is a Belgian bass opera singer and game designer. Born in Siegburg, Germany, to a Lebanese family, he studied Romance literature and trained in opera at the Royal Conservatory of Brussels and the Queen Elisabeth Music Chapel. He has performed widely in Belgium and abroad, appearing in operas by composers such as Verdi, Mozart, Puccini and Rossini, and was a prizewinner at international competitions including the Queen Elisabeth Competition.

Since 2010, Torbey has also designed and published board games, most notably the Oniverse series, beginning with Onirim (2010). His games have been released internationally, translated into several languages, and published by companies including Z-Man Games. In 2022, he founded his own publishing house, inPatience, which continues to release both his works and those of other designers.

== Early life and education ==
Shadi Torbey was born in Siegburg, North Rhine-Westphalia, Germany in 1976. He is of Lebanese descent. He studied at the Athénée royal d'Uccle in secondary school. He notably took French classes with Paul Pettiaux.

== Career ==
=== As an opera singer ===
A graduate in Romance literature and cultural management, Torbey obtained his professional singing diplomas (concert and opera) at the Royal Conservatory of Brussels in the class of Ludovic de San. He also perfected his skills at the Opera-Studio of Royal Theatre of La Monnaie and with José van Dam at the Queen Elisabeth Music Chapel.

Winner of the 1999 Vocation Prize at the Verviers International Singing Competition, he won a Golden Voice (melody category) at the 39th Tournament in 2001 in France. In 2004, he won third prize at the Queen Elisabeth Competition.

He has given recitals on numerous stages, notably in Belgium and France. In opera, he has played roles including Sparafucile (Rigoletto), Collatinus (The Rape of Lucretia), Masetto and Leporello (Don Giovanni), Abner (Athalia), Caronte (L'Orfeo), Eremit (Der Freischütz), Colline (La Bohème) and Lord Sidney/Don Prudenzio (Il viaggio a Reims).

He has worked under internationally renowned conductors and directors including William Christie, Patrick Davin, Eduardo López Banzo, Paul McCreesh, Philip Pickett, Marcello Viotti, Stéphane Braunschweig, Robert Carsen, Gérard Corbiau, Antonio Latella.

Torbey appeared in a student production, after which in 2000 he got his first role in a professional production: La Traviata.

A 2006 article from Fanfare was critical of a recording by Torbey, saying that he was not singing on pitch, and that the very low notes were out of his range.

Torbey was noted in 2013 for performing with pianist Kristina Raczynska, where his displayed mastery of Italian, German, and French.

Torney also worked as a singing teacher by 2018 between performing, and was fluent in French, English, Italian, German, and Arabic.

=== As a game designer ===
Since 2010, Torbey has published tabletop games for solo or cooperative play. His first game was Onirim (2010), originally published by Z-Man Games, part of the "Oniverse" series. Eight entries have been released, latest being Cyberion (2023). All games were illustrated by French artist Élise Plessis.

In 2022, he launched the publisher inPatience, focused on solo games, publishing his Oniverse games and others such as R.A.V.E.L. by Daniel McKinley or Feigard by Reiner Knizia.

In 2024, inPatience Games republished his game Urbion.

== Personal life ==
Torbey lives in Brussels, Belgium, with his wife and two daughters.

== Repertoire ==
Role	Opera	Composer
Sparafucile	Rigoletto	Giuseppe Verdi
Collatinus	The Rape of Lucretia	Benjamin Britten
Masetto and Leporello	Don Giovanni	Wolfgang Amadeus Mozart
Abner	Athalia	George Frideric Handel
Caronte	L'Orfeo	Claudio Monteverdi
Eremit	Der Freischütz	Carl Maria von Weber
Colline	La Bohème	Giacomo Puccini
Lord Sidney and Don Prudenzio	Il viaggio a Reims	Gioachino Rossini
Nick Shadow	The Rake's Progress	Igor Stravinsky

== Ludography ==
=== Oniverse series ===
- Onirim (2010, 2nd edition 2014)
- Urbion (2012, 2nd edition 2024)
- Castellion (2015)
- Sylvion (2015)
- Nautillion (2016)
- Aerion (2019)
- Stellarion (2022)
- Cyberion (2023)
- Ultimion (TBA)
