= Konrad der Pfaffe =

German Catholic epic poet

Konrad der Pfaffe (Conrad the Priest) was a German Catholic epic poet of the twelfth century, author of the Rolandslied, a German version of the famous French Chanson de Roland.

Very little is known concerning his life. In the epilogue of the Heidelberg manuscript, the poet calls himself "der Pfaffe Kuonrat", and informs us that he translated from the French, first into Latin, and then into German, without adding or omitting. He also says that the French original was procured for him by Duke Henry, at whose request he composed his lay. Formerly it was supposed that this duke was Henry the Lion (1156–80), and that the poem was composed between 1173 and 1177. But if the duke in question was Henry the Proud, who ruled Bavaria from 1126 to 1139, the date of the composition of the poem would then be about 1131, in which year Henry is known to have made a journey to Paris, where he presumably procured the French manuscript. The lay itself was written in Bavaria, probably at Ratisbon, as is indicated also by the frequent mention of Bavarian names and places.

That a translation was first made into Latin is shown by the numerous Latin endings that remain. A comparison with the French original reveals quite a number of additions, especially in the way of passages in praise of the Bavarian prince and people. The 1913 Catholic Encyclopedia describes the German translation as "not slavishly literal"; Harriet Dorothea MacPherson calls it "a free translation, which is sometimes designated as a paraphrase".

The crusading spirit, already noticeable in the Chanson, is still more marked in the German poem. The fervour of the crusader has displaced the patriotic enthusiasm of the French epic, and gives the Rolandslied a pronounced religious tone. Charlemagne is depicted as the model Christian prince, while Roland is the peerless Christian knight who loses his life in battle for his Faith. Yet the influence of the folk-epic is quite evident, as, for instance, in the passage where the emperor's dazzling eyes are described.

Altogether, there are 9094 verses. The form is the short rhymed couplet, the rhyme being often mere assonance.

No complete manuscript of the poem exists. The oldest and most important manuscript, that of Strasburg, was burned during the siege of 1870. A portion of it had appeared in print in Schilter's Thesaurus as early as 1727. Next in importance is the Heidelberg manuscript, adorned with thirty-nine miniatures. The other extant manuscripts are mere fragments. Editions by Grimm, Ruolandes liet (Göttingen, 1838), based on the Heidelberg manuscript; and by Bartsch (Leipzig, 1874), based on the Strasburg manuscript; and selections by Piper, "Die Spielmannsdichtung", II, 14-91 (in Kürschner, Deutsche National Litteratur, II).

To Konrad has also been ascribed the authorship of the Kaiserchronik, but not on convincing evidence.
