= Björn Franken (politician) =

German politician (born 1979)

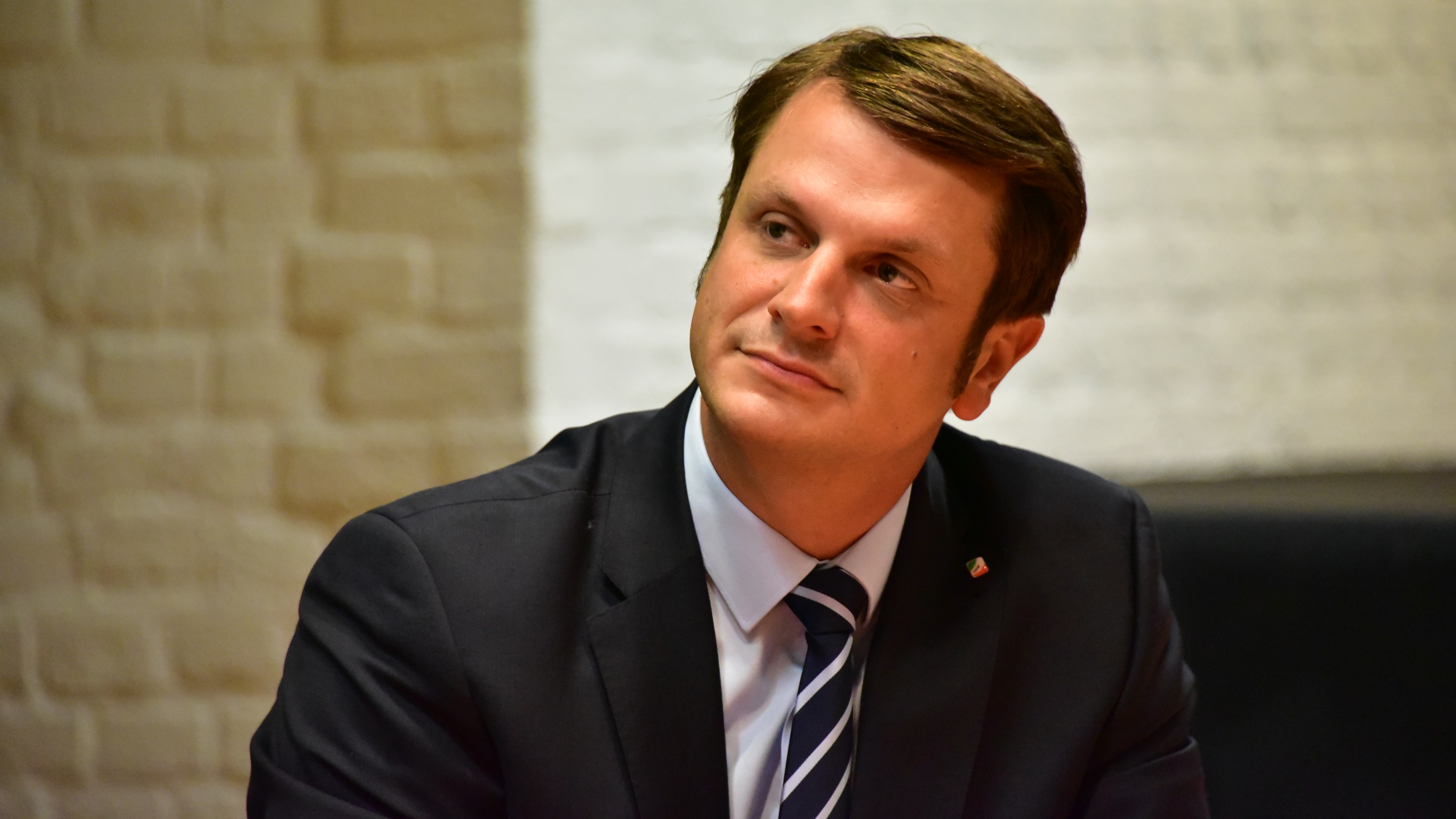
- Franken in 2017

Member of the Landtag of North Rhine-Westphalia
- Incumbent
- Assumed office 1 June 2017
- Preceded by: Dirk Schlömer
- Constituency: Rhein-Sieg-Kreis I

Personal details
- Born: 19 April 1979 (age 46) Siegburg
- Party: Christian Democratic Union (since 2001)

Björn Franken (born 19 April 1979 in Siegburg) is a German politician serving as a member of the Landtag of North Rhine-Westphalia since 2017. He has served as chairman of the Christian Democratic Union in Ruppichteroth since 2011.

== Early life and education ==
Franken was born in Siegburg as the son of a farmer and grew up in Ruppichteroth. After attending primary school in Schönenberg (1985–1989) and secondary school in Ruppichteroth, he transferred to the Higher Commercial School in Siegburg in 1995, where he obtained his Fachhochschulreife in 1997.

Between 1997 and 1999, he completed vocational training as an office communications clerk with the CDU/CSU parliamentary group in the German Bundestag in Bonn. He subsequently performed his compulsory military service from 1999 to 2000.

In 2001, Franken began studying economics at the Bonn-Rhein-Sieg University of Applied Sciences in Sankt Augustin, specializing in B2B marketing and human resource management. During his studies, he completed a semester abroad in Indonesia in 2005.

== Professional career ==
Following his graduation, Franken worked in the human resources department of a telecommunications company in Bonn. From 2008 until his election to the Landtag in 2017, he held a management position at a subsidiary of a major retail group in Cologne.

== Political career ==
=== Party positions ===
Franken served as the chairman of the Junge Union in Ruppichteroth from 2000 to 2008. He joined the CDU in 2001 and has chaired the Ruppichteroth local CDU chapter since 2011. In 2021, he was elected deputy district chairman of the CDU Rhein-Sieg.

In local politics, he was a member of the Ruppichteroth municipal council from 2004 to 2020. In 2014 and 2020, he was directly elected to the district council (Kreistag) of the Rhein-Sieg-Kreis.

=== Member of the Landtag ===
In the 2017 state election, Franken ran as a direct candidate for the Rhein-Sieg-Kreis I constituency and won with 43.9% of the vote. During the 17th legislative period, he served on the committees for Economic Affairs, Energy and State Planning, Integration, and Digitalization and Innovation.

He successfully defended his seat in the 2022 state election with 41.3% of the vote. In the current 18th legislative period, he is a member of the Committee for Economic Affairs, Industry, Climate Protection and Energy, as well as the Science Committee. He serves as the digital policy spokesperson for the CDU parliamentary group and acts as the commissioner for industry and medium-sized manufacturing companies.

== Voluntary engagement ==
Franken holds several honorary positions, including a seat in the assembly of the Metropolregion Rheinland and membership in the "Regionale 2025" commission of the Cologne regional council. Since March 2019, he has served as the chairman of the Bonn/Rhein-Sieg district association of the Schutzgemeinschaft Deutscher Wald (German Forest Protection Association), succeeding Andrea Milz.

== Personal life ==
Franken is married and has three children.
