= English studies =

Study of English-language literature, composition, and language arts

English studies (or simply, English) is an academic discipline taught in primary, secondary, and post-secondary education in English-speaking countries. This is not to be confused with English taught as a foreign language, which is a distinct discipline. The English studies discipline involves the study, analysis, and exploration of English literature through texts.

English studies include:

- The study of literature, especially novels, plays, short stories, and poetry. Although any English-language literature may be studied, the most commonly analyzed literature originates from Britain, the United States, and Ireland. Additionally, any given country or region teaching English studies will often emphasize its own local or national English-language literature.
- English composition, involving both the analysis of the structures of works of literature as well as the application of these structures in one's own writing.
- English language arts, which is the study of grammar, usage, and style.
- English sociolinguistics, including discourse analysis of written and spoken texts in the English language, the history of the English language, English language learning and teaching, and the study of World of English.

English linguistics (syntax, morphology, phonetics, phonology, etc.) is regarded as a distinct discipline, taught in a department of linguistics.

The North American Modern Language Association (MLA) divides English studies into two disciplines: a language-focused discipline, and a literature-focused discipline. At universities in non-English-speaking countries, one department often covers all aspects of English studies as well as English taught as a foreign language and English linguistics.

It is common for departments of English to offer courses and scholarships in all areas of the English language, such as literature, public speaking and speech-writing, rhetoric, composition studies, creative writing, philology and etymology, journalism, poetry, publishing, the philosophy of language, and theater and play-writing, among many others. In most English-speaking countries, the study of texts produced in non-English languages takes place in other departments, such as departments of foreign languages or comparative literature.

English studies is taught in a wide variety of manners, but one unifying commonality is that students engage with an English-language text in a critical manner. However, the methods of teaching a text, the manner of engaging with a text, and the selection of texts are all widely-debated subjects within the English studies field. Another unifying commonality is that this engagement with the text will produce a wide variety of skills, which can translate into many different careers.

== Fields ==
See also Literature and linguistics, along with List of academic disciplines

=== English literature ===
- American literature, including (but not limited to):
  - African American literature
  - Jewish American literature
  - Southern literature
- Australian literature
- British literature
- Canadian literature
- Indian English literature
- Irish literature
- New Zealand literature
- Scottish literature
- South African literature
- Welsh literature

Some fields may cover works in languages other than English. The works studied in these fields only fall within the English studies discipline if the object of study is an English-language work.

=== Other fields of English studies ===
- Composition studies
- Discourse analysis in English
- English sociolinguistics
- English language learning and teaching
- History of the English language
- Rhetoric
- Technical communication
- The World of English

== English studies at post-secondary institutions ==
The English major (alternatively "English concentration") is a term in the United States and several other countries for an undergraduate university degree focused around reading, analyzing, and writing texts in the English language. The term also can be used to describe a student who is pursuing the degree.

Prospective English majors can expect to take college courses in academic writing, creative writing, literary theory, British and American literature, multicultural literature, several literary genres (such as poetry, drama, and film studies), and a number of elective multidisciplinary topics such as history, courses in the social sciences, and studies in a foreign language. To the end of studying these disciplines, many degree programs also offer training in professional writing with relations to rhetoric, literary analysis, an appreciation for the diversity of cultures, and an ability to clearly and persuasively express their ideas in writing.

=== History ===
The history of English studies at the modern university in Europe begins in the eighteenth century. Initially, English studies comprised a wide variety of content: the practice of oratory, the study of rhetoric and grammar, the composition of poetry, and the appreciation of literature (mostly by authors from England, since American literature and language study was only added in the twentieth century). In Germany and several other European countries, English philology, a practice of reading pre-modern texts, became the preferred scholarly paradigm. However, English-speaking countries distanced themselves from philological paradigms soon after World War I. At the end of this process, many English departments refocused their work on various forms of writing instruction (creative, professional, critical) and the interpreting of literary texts.

The English major rose to prominence in American colleges during the first half of the 1970s. It provided an opportunity for students to develop critical skills in analytical reading with the aim of improving their writing. It focused on exercises in rhetoric and persuasive expression that had been traditionally only taught in classical studies. Outside the United States (originating in Scotland and then rippling out into the English-speaking world) the English major became popular in the latter half of the 19th century, during a time when religious beliefs were shaken in the face of scientific discoveries. Literature was thought to act as a replacement for religion in the retention and advancement of culture, and the English Major thus provided students with the chance to draw moral, ethical, and philosophical qualities and meanings of older studies from a richer and broader source of literature than that of the ancient Greek and Latin classics.

In the 1990s, there was a collective effort by Anglicists to standardize the academic discipline to follow similar methods of analysis and self-evaluation of both English literature and the criticism of said literature. However, after backlash described this standardization as restricting, Anglicists decided to de-standardize the field, meaning that there is no current standard methodology regarding teaching and creating English studies. In removing this standardization, many scholars are reconsidering the function of experts in teaching English studies. While the predominant pedagogy focused on a hierarchical approach, with expert Anglicists advising teachers how to teach English studies, emerging discussions call for approaches that value diversity and with it the identities that students of English studies bring to experts.

=== Skills acquired ===
The absence of a clearly defined disciplinary identity and the increasingly utilitarian goals in U.S. society present a challenge to those academic units still mostly focusing on the printed book and the traditional division in historical periods and national literatures, and neglecting allegedly non-theoretical areas such as professional writing, composition, and multimodal communication. In the past, an academic degree in English usually meant an intensive study of British and American literary masterpieces.

Now, however, an English Major encompasses a much broader range of topics which stretch over multiple disciplines. While the requirements for an English Major vary from university to university, most English departments emphasize three core skills: analyzing texts (a process which requires logic and reflective analysis), creativity and imagination with regard to the production of good writing, including a good understanding of the rhetorical situation; and an understanding of different cultures, civilizations, and literary styles from various time periods. Graduates with English degrees develop critical thinking skills essential to a number of career fields they pursue after graduation. Such careers that graduates pursue can include, but are not limited to, writing, editing, publishing, teaching, research, advertising, public relations, law, and finance.

=== Career opportunities ===
An English degree opens a variety of career opportunities for college graduates entering the job market. Since students who graduate with an English degree are trained to ask probing questions about large bodies of texts and then to formulate, analyze, and answer those questions in coherent, persuasive prose—skills vital to any number of careers—English majors have much to choose from after graduation. Typical career choices for English majors include positions in writing, publishing, teaching, journalism, and human resources. However, there are also career opportunities in fields such as advertising, public relations, acting, law, business, marketing, information assurance, and directing.

==== Anglicist ====
An Anglicist is someone who works in the field of English studies. Historically, the term Anglicist has been very loosely defined, with the term mistakenly used in the same vein as Anglist, a label meant for historians and their studies. However, there have been very specific terms used to describe the different disciplines of English studies and those who study them, such as grammarian; a grammarian focused on the study of English grammar.

== English studies at secondary schools ==
English studies in secondary-schools vary depending on what country they are taught in. Further, English studies will differ between institutions within a country, as each school will have different teaching methods and curriculum. However, all countries share commonalities in their instruction via the teaching of literature analysis, reading comprehension, composition, and language arts, as well as writing skills. These skills are then expanded and built upon in post-secondary institutions.

=== North America ===
==== Canada ====
===== Ontario =====
Students in Ontario high schools have specific course requirements they must meet before they can graduate. In regards to English studies, students must take four full credits in English, one in each grade level. They must also pass a Literacy test.

==== United States ====
Students in grades 9–12 learn the skills of critical thinking and analysis by practicing close reading. Students are asked to draw connections from the texts they are assigned with ideas discussed in class. They are also taught how to analyze fiction and nonfiction works and answer questions using citations from the texts. Overall, most high school English programs follow the Common Core Standards, which require students to meet objectives in reading, writing, speaking and listening.

=== Europe ===
In European secondary schools, the studies of the English language are integrated into regular curriculum. English education is so deeply embedded that Europe as a whole has 91% of secondary school students taking courses in English. This rate goes as high as 100% in Denmark, Sweden, Germany, Italy, Malta, North Macedonia, Slovenia, Liechtenstein, and Bosnia and Herzegovina. Furthermore, every European country (except Belgium) have at least one test administered nationally to assess English proficiencies of its students.

==== Britain ====
Most British children take English Language and English Literature as GCSE / National 5 or subjects, and many go on to study these at A Level / Higher and Advanced Higher. Along with what is typically covered in English studies regarding the written analysis of English literature, an emphasis is placed particularly on the prestige of British literature and its importance as a foundational part of English studies. Additionally, as is present in the overall discussion of English studies, British educators continue to debate the relevance of Shakespeare for contemporary teens, with some arguing for more modern texts and others upholding the virtues of the classics. See also O Level.

=== Asia ===
==== China ====
In China, their school curriculum is more focused on drilling and multiple questions, rather than students understanding the language authentically. This is one method on how a preparatory English program in China teaches their international students.

==== Japan ====
In Japan, there is another form of teaching called Task-supported language teaching (TSLT) that focuses on English used as a communication tool. English is used as a communication tool, as opposed to literature analysis. This research looks at how a method called TSLT can help in English classes for people who speak English as a foreign language. It studies how students, teachers, and textbooks are important in this method. It also looks at how this method works in a typical Japanese high school class.

The Japan Association for Language Teaching focuses on Japanese high school students in the L1 and L2 low writing and reading levels. Their low reading and writing levels in both English and Japanese could be due to them not being taught how.

== See also ==
- Academic English
- American Literature (academic discipline)
- English as a second language
- Literati
- Literary Research Guide
