= The Year's Work in Modern Language Studies =

- YWMLS covers as published by Maney (left) and MHRA (centre), and a copy of the YWMLS style sheet
- Discipline: Linguistics
- Language: English

Publication details
- History: 1930–present
- Publisher: Brill Publishers

Standard abbreviations
- ISO 4: Year's Work Mod. Lang. Stud.

Indexing
- ISSN: 0084-4152 (print); 2222-4297 (web)

Links
- Journal homepage; Online access (1930–2014)

The Year's Work in Modern Language Studies (YWMLS) is an English-language evaluative bibliographical journal which appears annually, containing reports on new scholarship in the fields of European languages, linguistics, literature and film, except for English studies. The MLA Literary Research Guide says: "YWMLS is the single most comprehensive evaluative survey of scholarship on European and Latin American languages and literatures. Taken together, the annual volumes offer an incomparable record of scholarly and critical trends as well as of the fluctuations of academic reputations of literary works and authors."

== Contents ==
YWMLS is divided into the following main parts:

1. Latin (medieval and modern)
2. Romance Languages
3. Celtic Languages
4. Germanic Languages
5. Slavonic Languages

These are subdivided into reports on individual languages and periods, such as "Early Medieval French Literature" or "French Literature 1945–1999". In total about 75 such surveys are written by scholars traditionally based mainly in Britain, but increasingly also around Europe and North America. The volume typically appears early in the second year after the survey year, so that for example volume 82, containing the report on 2020, was published in February 2022.

== History ==
YWMLS first appeared in 1930, covering Medieval Latin, Italian Studies, French Studies, Hispanic studies (including Basque and Rumanian), Germanic Studies and Celtic Studies. There was a break during the war years, and volume 11 covers 1940–49. From volume 11 onwards, Scandinavian Studies and Slavonic Studies were included. The reports grew in length until volume 44 filled 1432 pages, after which page limits were introduced. Volume 76 (survey year 2014) has five sectional editors and 56 contributing editors. Over its first 76 volumes, YWMLS has generated some 70,000 pages of critical bibliography and indices.

For many years, the work was edited by Glanville Price and David Wells. In 1991, General Editorship passed to Peter Mayo, with separate sectional editors for each subject area. From 1997 till 2016 the general editor was Stephen Parkinson (Portuguese Studies, Oxford). The volumes were published by Oxford University Press, then later by Maney Publishing, and from volume 72, by the Modern Humanities Research Association (MHRA). In 2016, YWMLS was purchased by Brill (Leiden), and the general editorship passed to Paul Scott (Kansas) and Graeme Dunphy (Würzburg). YWMLS is now also accessible on JSTOR.

YWMLS aims to balance as wide as possible a listing of new titles with critical evaluation of the most important. As the development of internet resources made it easier for scholars to find new titles, the need for comprehensive bibliographical listings waned somewhat, and the focus of the work became more strongly evaluative. Traditionally the contributors to YWMLS were scholars of Modern Languages at British universities, and there was a strong focus on British scholarship. However, since the beginning of the 21st century there have been a growing number of American and continental European contributors, and the focus has become more international.
