= Veste Coburg =

Medieval fortress in the town of Coburg, Germany

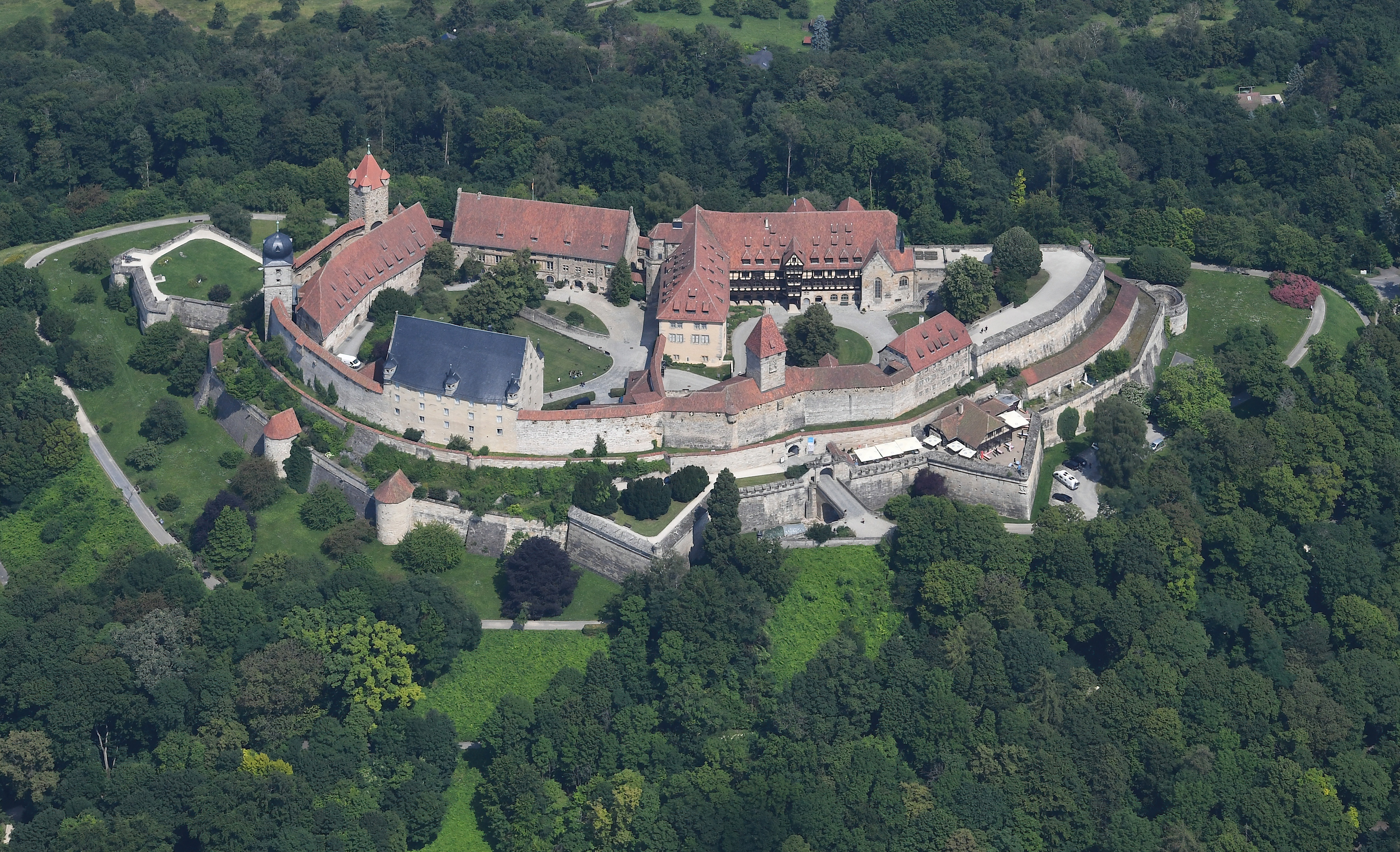
- Aerial view of the Veste from the south

- Location within Bavaria Location within Germany

General information
- Type: Fortress, hill castle
- Architectural style: Romanesque to Gothic revival
- Location: Coburg, Germany
- Coordinates: 50.2640120497218°N 10.982449715039591°E
- Elevation: 464 m (1,522 ft)
- Current tenants: Kunstsammlungen der Veste Coburg
- Construction started: 10th century (first fortifications)
- Renovated: 1838-60, 1906-24
- Owner: Bayerische Verwaltung der staatlichen Schlösser, Gärten und Seen

Design and construction
- Architects: Bodo Ebhardt (early 20th-century renovation)

Website
- Veste Coburg

The Veste Coburg (Coburg Fortress) is one of the best-preserved medieval fortresses of Germany. It is situated on a hill above the town of Coburg, in the Upper Franconia region of Bavaria.

== Geography ==
=== Location ===
Veste Coburg dominates the town of Coburg on Bavaria's border with Thuringia. It is located at an altitude of 464 meters above NHN, or 167 meters above the town. Its size (around 135 meters by 260 meters) represents one of the medium fortresses in Germany.

== History ==
=== Early history and Middle Ages ===
The hill on which Veste Coburg stands had been inhabited from the Neolithic to the early Middle Ages, according to studies on results of excavations. The first documentary mention of Coburg occurs in 1056, in a gift by Richeza of Lotharingia. Richeza gave her properties to Anno II, Archbishop of Cologne, to allow the creation of Saalfeld Abbey in 1071. In 1075, a chapel dedicated to Saint Peter and Saint Paul is mentioned on the fortified Coberg. This document also refers to a Vogt named Gerhart, implying that the local possessions of the Saalfeld Benedictines were administered from the hill.

A document signed by Pope Honorius II in 1206 refers to a mons coburg, a hill settlement. In the 13th century, the hill overlooked the town of Trufalistat (Coburg's predecessor) and the important trade route from Nuremberg via Erfurt to Leipzig. A document dated from 1225 uses the term sloss (palace) for the first time. At the time, the town was controlled by the Dukes of Merania (or Meran). They were followed in 1248 by the Counts of Henneberg who ruled Coburg until 1353, save for a period from 1292-1312, when the House of Ascania (Askanien) was in charge.

In 1353, Coburg fell to Friedrich, Markgraf von Meißen of the House of Wettin. His successor, Friedrich der Streitbare was awarded the status of Elector of Saxony in 1423. Thus, Coburg – despite being in Franconia – was now referred to as "Saxony", like other properties of the House of Wettin. As a result of the Hussite Wars the fortifications of the Veste were expanded in 1430.

=== Early modern times through Thirty Years' War ===
In 1485, in the Partition of Leipzig, Veste Coburg fell to the Ernestine branch of the family. A year later, Elector Friedrich der Weise and Johann der Beständige took over the rule of Coburg. Johann used the fortress as a residence from 1499. In 1506/07, Lucas Cranach the Elder lived and worked in the Fortress. From April to October 1530, during the Diet of Augsburg, Martin Luther sought protection at the Fortress, as he was under an Imperial ban at the time. Whilst he stayed at the fortress, Luther continued with his work translating the Bible into German. In 1547, Johann Ernst moved the residence of the ducal family to a more convenient and fashionable location, Ehrenburg Palace in the town center of Coburg. The Veste now only served as a fortification.

In the further splitting of the Ernestine line, Coburg became the seat of the Herzogtum von Sachsen-Coburg, the Duchy of Saxe-Coburg. The first duke was Johann Casimir (1564-1633), who modernized the fortifications. In 1632, the fortress was unsuccessfully besieged by Imperial and Bavarian forces commanded by Albrecht von Wallenstein for seven days during the Thirty Years' War. Its defence was commanded by Georg Christoph von Taupadel. On 17 March 1635, after a renewed siege of five months' duration, the Veste was handed over to the Imperials under Guillaume de Lamboy. The Field Marshal presented to the defenders a falsified letter, seemingly written by the Duke, ordering the handover.

=== 17th through 19th centuries ===
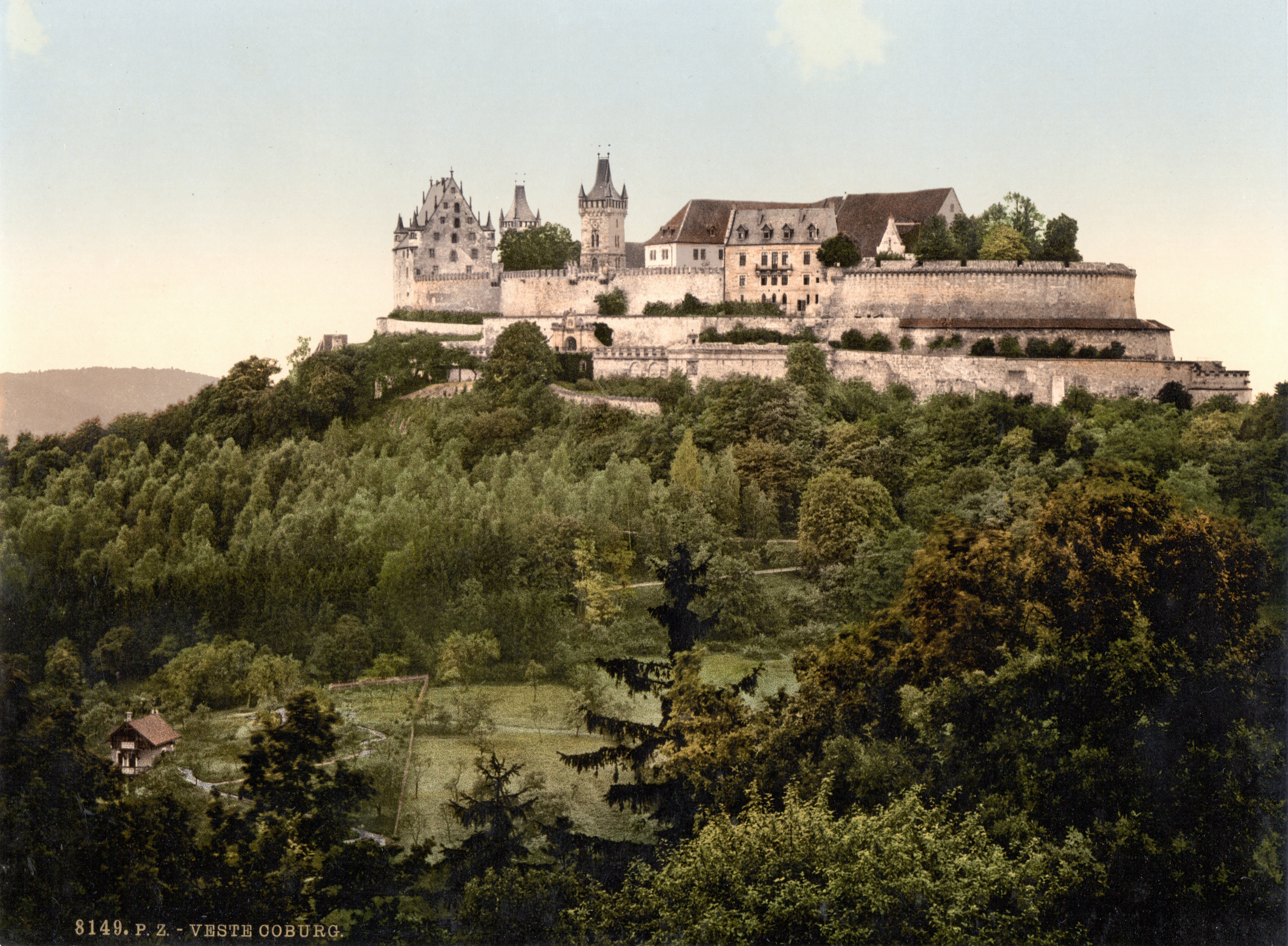
The fortress as it looked in the late 19th century or early 20th century

From 1638 to 1672, Coburg and the fortress were part of the Duchy of Saxe-Altenburg. In 1672, they passed to the Dukes of Saxe-Gotha and in 1735 it was joined to the Duchy of Saxe-Saalfeld. Following the introduction of Primogeniture by Duke Franz Josias (1697-1764), Coburg went by way of Ernst Friedrich (1724-1800) to Franz (1750-1806), noted art collector, and to Duke Ernst III (1784-1844), who remodeled the castle.

In 1826, the Duchy of Saxe-Coburg-Gotha was created and Ernst now styled himself "Ernst I". Military use of the fortress had ceased by 1700 and outer fortifications had been demolished in 1803-38. From 1838-60, Ernst had the run-down fortress converted into a Gothic revival residence. In 1860, use of the Zeughaus as a prison (since 1782) was discontinued. Through a successful policy of political marriages, the House of Saxe-Coburg and Gotha established links with several of the major European dynasties, including that of the United Kingdom.

=== 20th century ===
The dynasty's last reigning monarch was Charles Edward, Duke of Saxe-Coburg and Gotha (1884–1954), a grandson of Queen Victoria, who until 1919 was also the 2nd Duke of Albany in the peerage of the United Kingdom. Under his rule, many changes which had been made to the Veste Coburg in the 19th century were reversed under the architect Bodo Ebhardt, with the aim of restoring a more authentic medieval look. Along with the other ruling princes of Germany, Charles Edward was deposed in the revolution of 1918-1919. He abdicated in late 1918, and the fortress came into the possession of the state of Bavaria, but the former duke was allowed to live there until his death. The works of art collected by the family were given to the Coburger Landesstiftung, a foundation which today runs the museum.

In 1945, the fortress was seriously damaged by artillery fire in the final days of the Second World War. After 1946, renovation works were undertaken by the new owner, the Bavarian Administration of State-Owned Palaces, Gardens and Lakes.

== Today ==
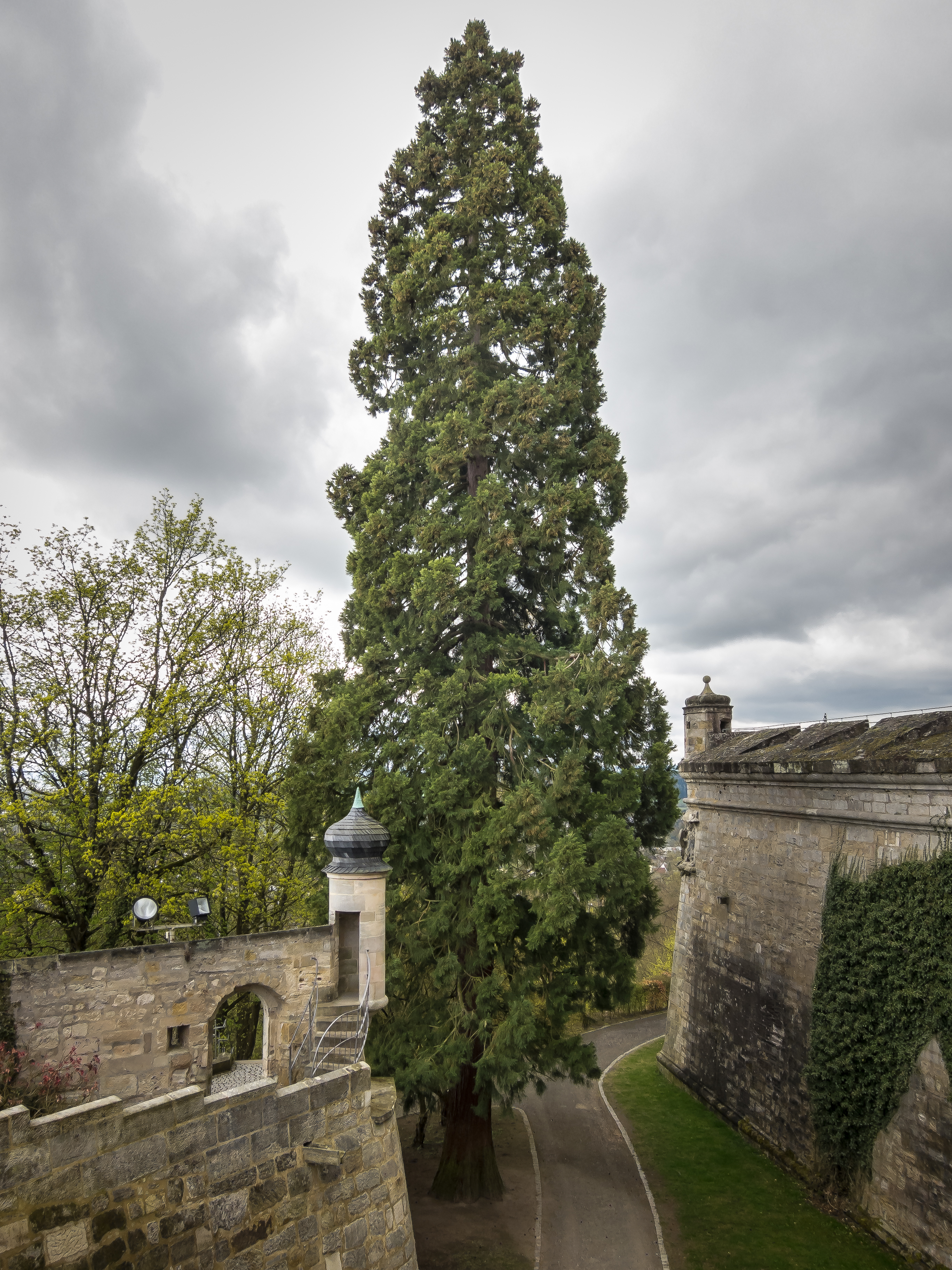
Redwood (sequoiadendron giganteum) near the portal

Veste Coburg is open to the public and today houses museums, including a collection of art objects and paintings that belonged to the ducal family of Saxe-Coburg and Gotha, a large collection of arms and armor, significant examples of early modern coaches and sleighs, and important collections of prints, drawings and coins.
