= Sevtap Baycılı =

Dutch writer of Turkish descenter

Sevtap Baycılı is a Dutch writer of Turkish descent. Born in Istanbul in 1968, she studied philosophy in Turkey, earning the nickname "Miss Wittgenstein". She settled in the Netherlands in 1991.

Her first novel, De Markov-keten ("The Markov chain", 1998) is an exploration of the thoughts of a psychiatric patient, obviously influenced by Becket, and with a strong philosophical element.

A second novel, De nachtmerrie van de allochtoon ("The foreigner's nightmare", 1999) is a satirical, often comical comment on Dutch expectations of the integration of foreigners.

Donderpreken is non-fiction.

Her journalistic work includes the interactive internet column Kip en ei zonder kop ("Chicken and egg without a head"), at Intermediair online.

Three unpublished dramas go by the collective title of Reductio ad absurdum.

In English and Dutch sources, her surname is often written Baycili, for want of the correct Turkish fonts.

== See also ==
- Migrant literature
