= Siegburg =

- Town
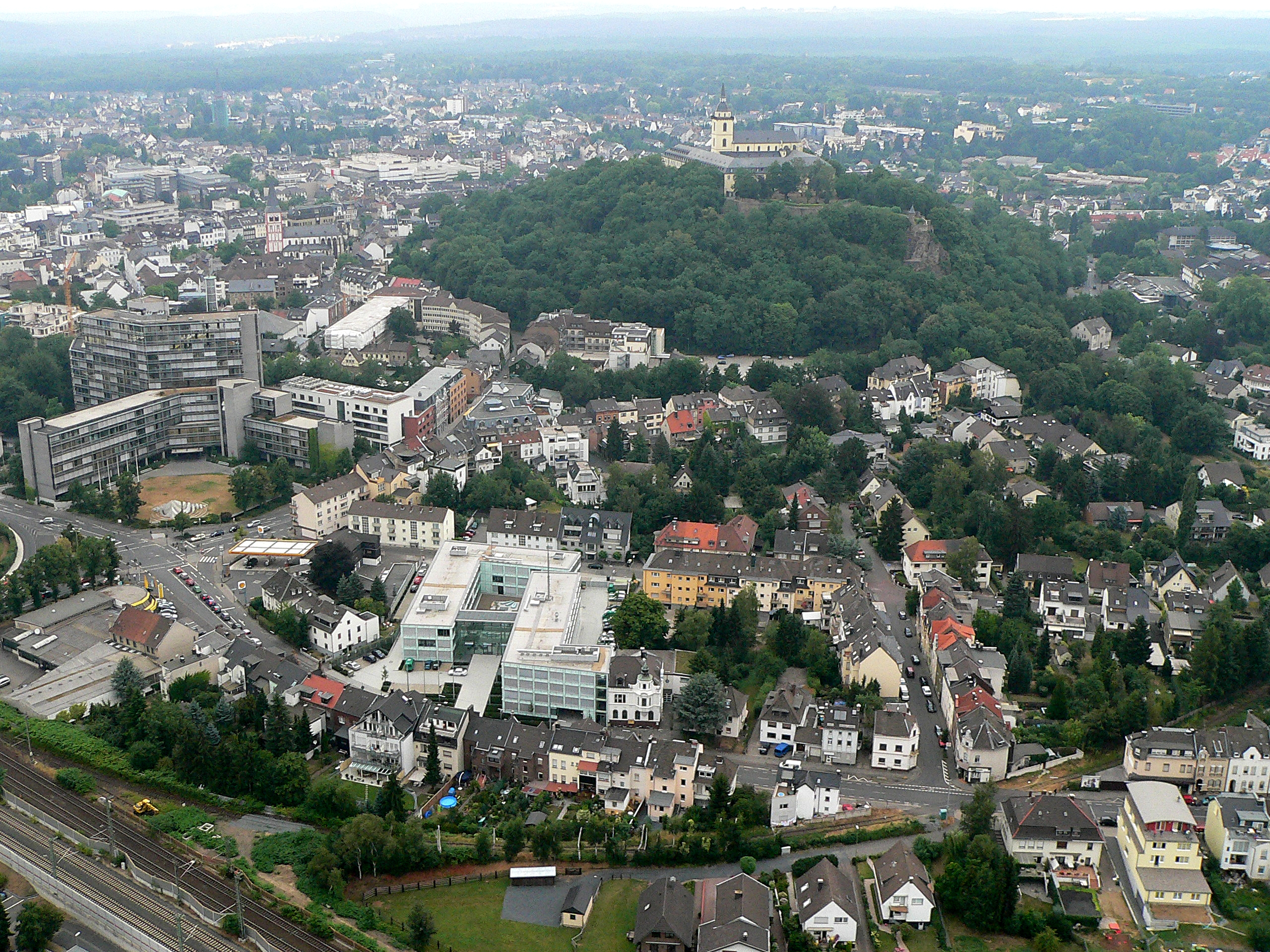
- Aerial view

- Coat of arms

- Location of Siegburg within Rhein-Sieg-Kreis district
- Interactive map of Siegburg
- Location within Germany Location within North Rhine-Westphalia
- Coordinates: 50°48′5″N 7°12′16″E
- Country: Germany
- State: North Rhine-Westphalia
- Admin. region: Köln
- District: Rhein-Sieg-Kreis
- Subdivisions: 8

Government
  - Mayor (2020–25): Stefan Rosemann (SPD)
  - Governing parties: SPD/ Greens/ FDP

Area
  - Total: 23.66 km^{2} (9.14 sq mi)
- Elevation: 60 m (200 ft)

Population (2025-12-31)
  - Total: 42,204
  - Density: 1,784/km^{2} (4,620/sq mi)
- Time zone: UTC+01:00 (CET)
  - Summer (DST): UTC+02:00 (CEST)
- Postal codes: 53721
- Dialling codes: 02241
- Vehicle registration: SU
- Website: https://siegburg.de/

Siegburg (German pronunciation: [ˈziːkbʊʁk]; i.e. fort on the Sieg river; Ripuarian: Sieburch) is a city in the district of Rhein-Sieg-Kreis in North Rhine-Westphalia, Germany. It is located on the banks of the rivers Sieg and Agger, 10 kilometres (6.2 mi) from the former seat of West German government Bonn and 26 kilometres (16 mi) from Cologne. The resident population of the city was 42,204 as of December 2025.

== Geography ==
Siegburg is located approximately 8 kilometres (5.0 mi) east of the river Rhine, at the confluence where the Agger joins the Sieg, in the southeast corner of the Cologne Lowland. Neighbouring towns include Troisdorf, Lohmar, Sankt Augustin and Hennef. The nearby cities of Cologne and Bonn are easily accessible through good transport links. The highest point of the urban area is 220 metres (720 ft) above sea level (NHN) in the Braschoß area and the lowest point is just under 54 metres (177 ft) above sea level at the mouth of the Agger.

== History ==
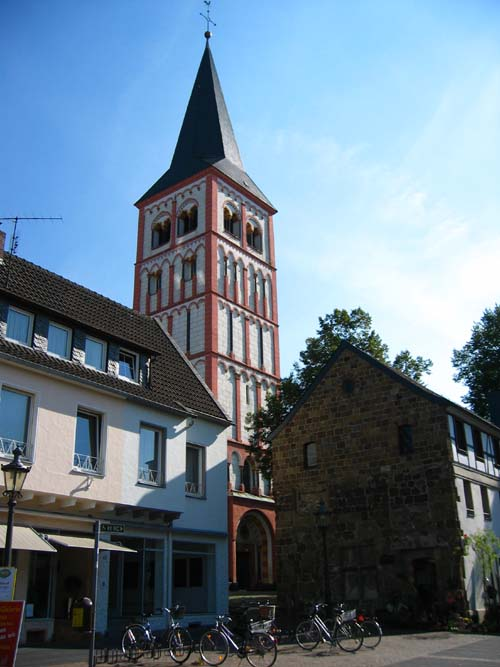
St. Servatius and the Zum Winter House

Archbishop-Elector Anno II of Cologne founded a Benedictine monastery in 1064, known as Michaelsberg Abbey, on top of the hill also called the Michaelsberg. A settlement that arose from that was first mentioned as a city in 1182. Siegburg reached the height of its prosperity in the 15th and 16th century. It is famous for its pottery, especially for the Siegburg pitchers (Siegburger Krüge).

Siegburg has been the county seat of the Rhein-Sieg-Kreis since 1816.

Siegburg's synagogue was destroyed on Kristallnacht, signaling the demise of its Jewish community.

== Population ==
Historical population

| Year | Pop. | ±% p.a. |
|---|---|---|
| 1965 | 34,883 | — |
| 1970 | 35,166 | +0.16% |
| 1975 | 34,946 | −0.13% |
| 1980 | 34,620 | −0.19% |
| 1985 | 34,319 | −0.17% |
| 1990 | 35,441 | +0.65% |
| 1995 | 36,998 | +0.86% |

| Year | Pop. | ±% p.a. |
|---|---|---|
| 2000 | 37,638 | +0.34% |
| 2005 | 38,855 | +0.64% |
| 2010 | 39,746 | +0.45% |
| 2015 | 41,016 | +0.63% |
| 2020 | 41,669 | +0.32% |
| 2025 | 42,204 | +0.26% |

Source: Landesdatabank Nordrhein-Westfalen

== Politics ==
City council as elected in 2025
Total 44 seats
- The Left (Germany): 2
- Social Democratic Party of Germany: 14
- Alliance 90/The Greens: 5
- Siegburger Citizens Union: 1
- Free Democratic Party (Germany): 1
- Christian Democratic Union of Germany: 15
- Volksabstimmung: 1
- Alternative for Germany: 5

Municipal elections are held every five years, in which the mayor and city council of Siegburg, as well as the district administrator (German: Landrat) and district council (German: Kreistag) of the Rhein-Sieg-Kreis are chosen. The last election took place on 14 September 2025.

=== City council ===
The city council (German: Stadtrat) of Siegburg consists of 44 councillors, half of which are chosen directly in 22 constituencies. The remaining 22 seats are distributed via party lists, resulting in a proportional representation.

On 30 October 2020 the Social Democrats, Greens, and Liberals agreed to form a coalition government.

=== Mayor ===
The mayor of Siegburg is Stefan Rosemann, who was elected with 57.54% of the vote. He stated that he would withdraw from party politics and completely focus on the mayoral office. He was sworn into office on 5 November 2020.

== Transport ==
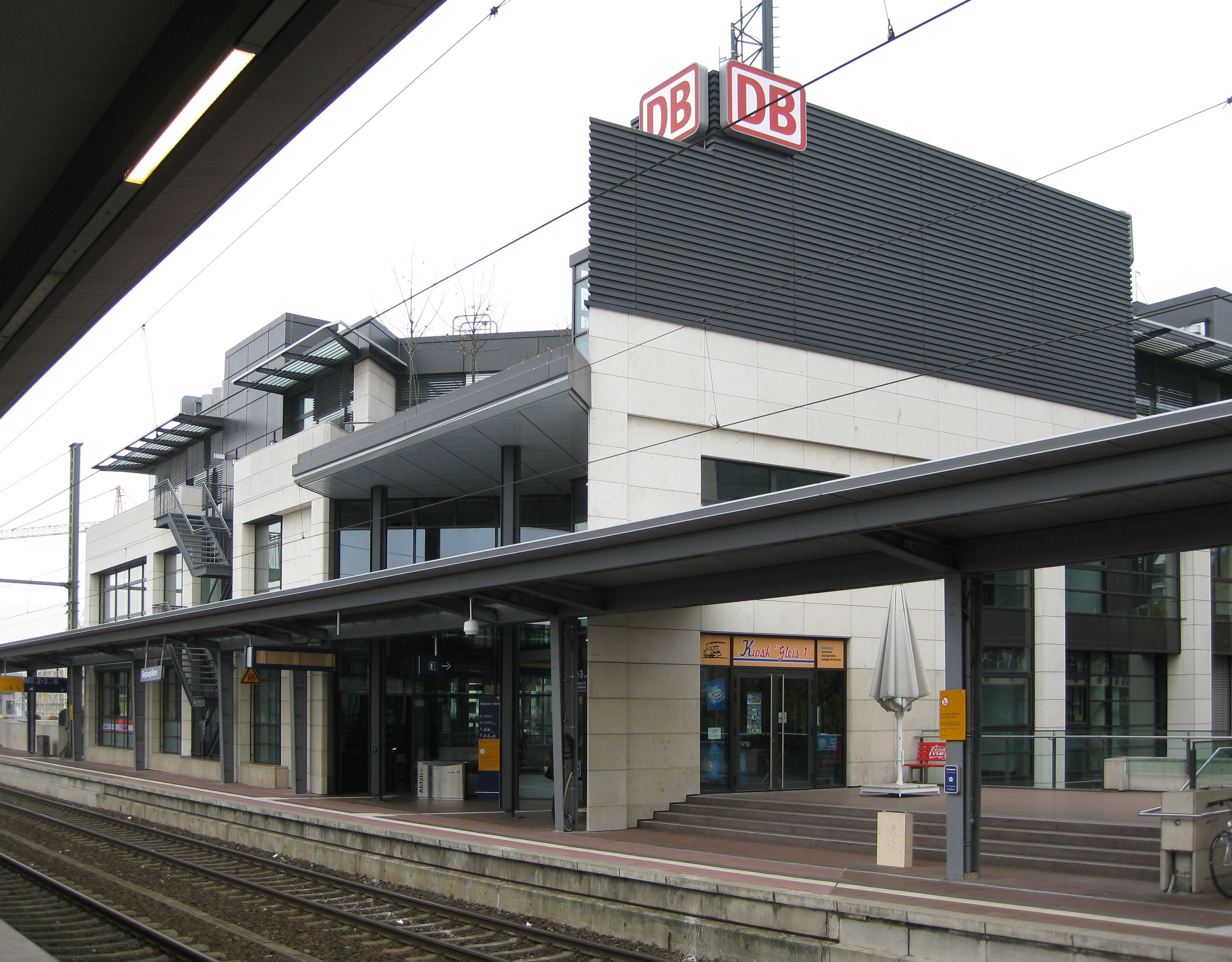
Siegburg/Bonn station, reception building

Station of the Bonn lightrail in the basement

Siegburg/Bonn station is a railway station on the Cologne-Frankfurt high-speed railway and the Sieg Railway. The name of the station derives from it having been rebuilt for the high-speed line in order to serve Bonn. It is connected to Bonn by the Siegburg line of the Bonn Stadtbahn every 10 or 15 minutes by the line 66. The station is also served by the lines S12 and S19 of the Cologne S-Bahn and the local train Rhein-Sieg-Express (RE9) and located in the network area of the Verkehrsverbund Rhein-Sieg (Rhine-Sieg Transport Association, VRS) public transit authority and the fare association Rheinland-Tarif.

== Twin towns – sister cities ==
Siegburg is twinned with:

- Bolesławiec, Poland
- Guarda, Portugal
- Nogent-sur-Marne, France
- Orestiada, Greece
- Selçuk, Turkey

== Notable people ==
- Karl Ferdinand Wimar (1828–1862), painter
- Engelbert Humperdinck (1854–1921), composer
- Adelheid Wette, author, composer and librettist
- Joseph Hermann Mohr (1834–1892), priest, hymn writer and hymnologist
- Liselotte Hammes (born 1933), operatic soprano and academic voice teacher
- Wolfgang Overath (born 1943), footballer
- Shadi Torbey (born 1976), opera singer and game designer
- Björn Franken (born 1979), politician
- Anja-Nina Bahrmann (born 1980), soprano
- Catharina Felser (born 1982), racing driver
