= Literary Research Guide =

American reference work

- Author: James L. Harner
- Publisher: Modern Language Association
- Publication date: 2008 (5th edition)
- Pages: 826
- ISBN: 9780873528085

Literary Research Guide is a reference work that annotates and evaluates important research materials related to English literature and English literary studies. The first edition appeared in 1989 and the fifth edition was published in 2008. These editions were printed books and the work was digitalized into an electronic version c. 2008.

The latest edition describes its mission as follows: "a selected, annotated guide to reference sources essential to the study of British literature, literatures of the United States, other literatures in English and related topics".

This work won Choice Outstanding Academic Book Award which was given by the Association of College and Research Libraries's review magazine Choice.

The author of the Guide was James L. Harner (died May 2016), an academic at Texas A&M University, who also edited the World Shakespeare Bibliography, which is now online and is the single-largest Shakespeare database in the world.

== Bibliography ==
- Fyn, Amy F. (2011). "Review of Literary Research Guide, 5th ed". Reference & User Services Quarterly. 50 (3): 301. doi:10.5860/rusq.50n3.301. ISSN 1094-9054. JSTOR 41241185.
- Herschman, Judith (2000). "Review of Literary Research Guide: An Annotated Listing of Reference Sources in English Literary Studies". The Library Quarterly: Information, Community, Policy. 70 (1): 155–157. doi:10.1086/603177. ISSN 0024-2519. JSTOR 4309422.
- McLeod, Colin (1976). "Review of Literary Research Guide". RQ. 16 (2): 184–185. ISSN 0033-7072. JSTOR 41354422.
- "Review of Literary Research Guide; An Annotated Listing of Reference Sources in English Literary Studies. 5th ed". The Papers of the Bibliographical Society of America. 103 (1): 126. 2009. doi:10.1086/pbsa.103.1.24293795. ISSN 0006-128X. JSTOR 24293795.
- Paster, Gail Kern; Mowat, Barbara A. (December 29, 2016). "In Memoriam: James L. Harner". Shakespeare Quarterly. 67 (2): 177–179. doi:10.1353/shq.2016.0021. ISSN 1538-3555. S2CID 193590781 – via Project MUSE.
