= Martin Opitz =

German poet (1597–1639)

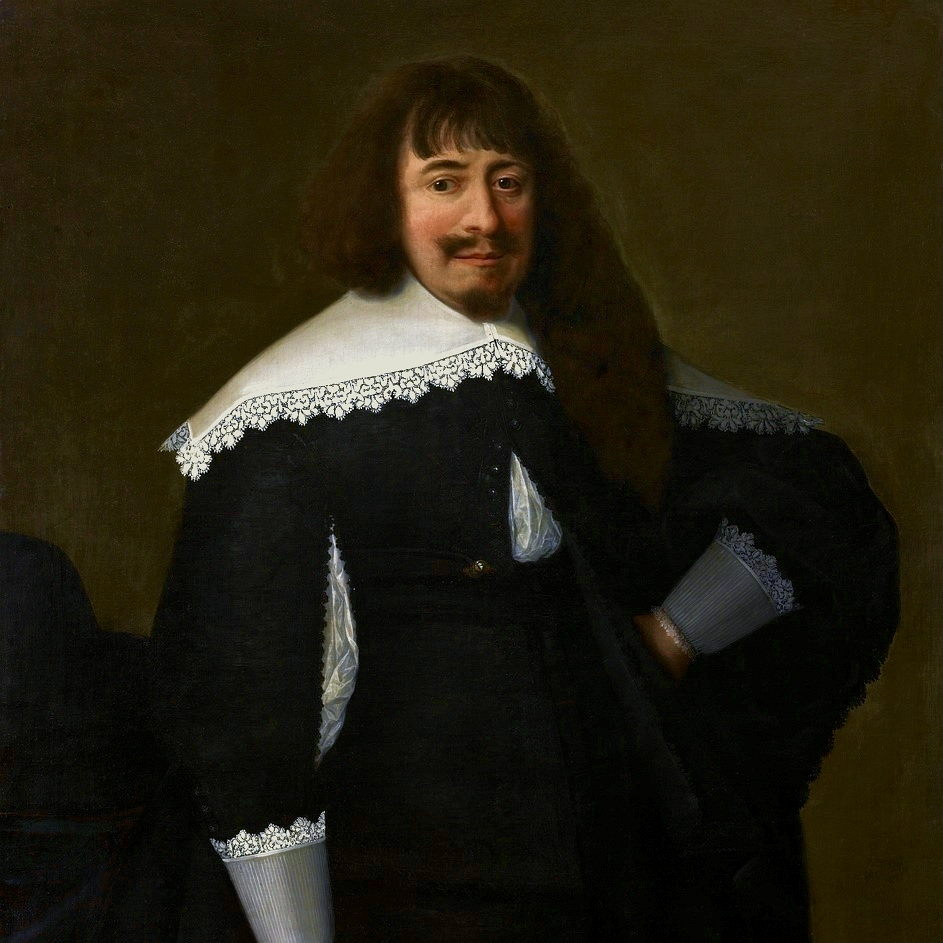
Martin Opitz by Bartholomeus Strobel, 1636–37

Martin Opitz von Boberfeld (23 December 1597 – 20 August 1639) was a German-language poet active in Poland.

== Biography ==
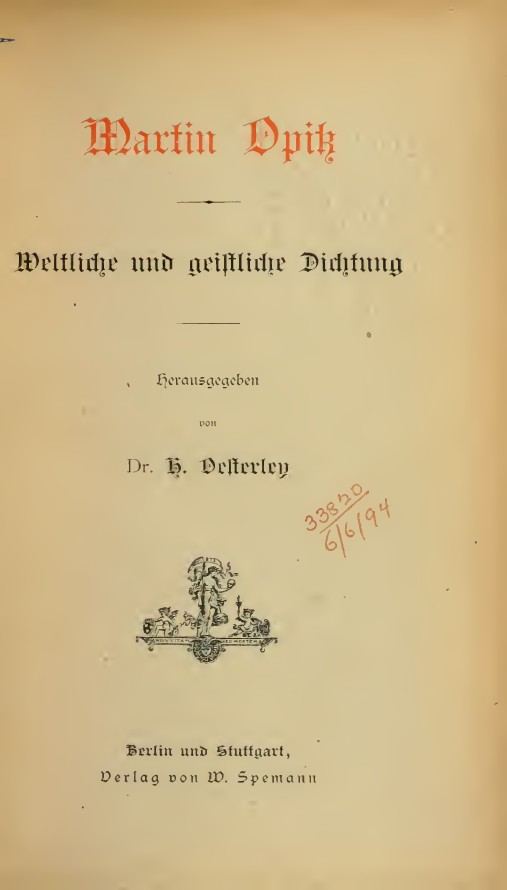
Weltliche und geistliche Dichtung (1888)

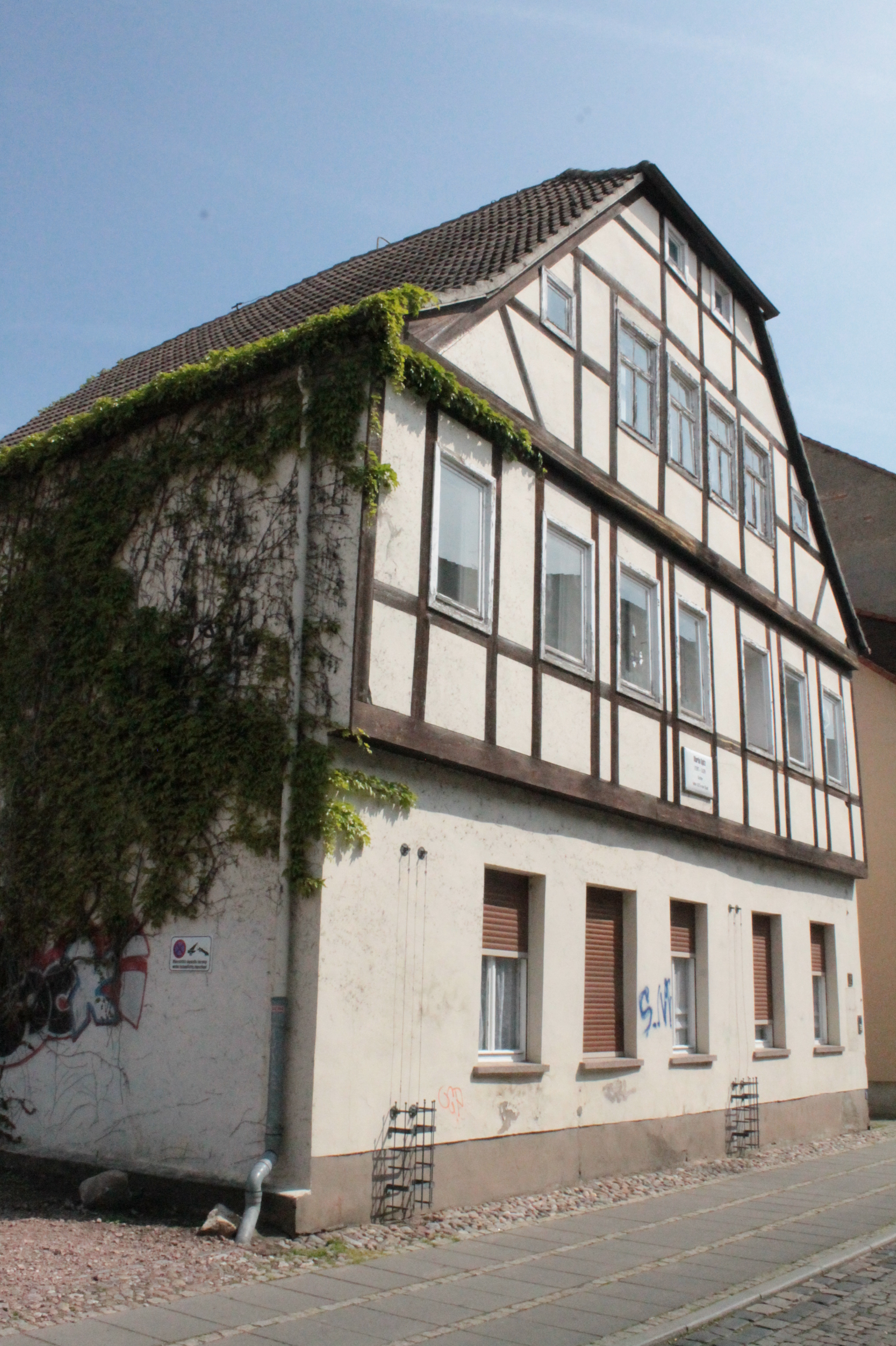
House in Wittenberg commemorating the stay of Martin Opitz in 1625

Opitz was born in Bunzlau (Bolesławiec) in Lower Silesia, in the Principality of Schweidnitz-Jauer, the son of a prosperous citizen. He received his early education at the gymnasium of his native town, of which his uncle was rector, and in 1617 attended the high school—"Schönaichianum"—at Beuthen an der Oder (Bytom Odrzański), where he made a special study of French, Dutch and Italian poetry. In 1618 he entered the University of Frankfurt-on-Oder as a student of literae humaniores, and in the same year published his first essay, Aristarchus, sive De contemptu linguae Teutonicae, which presented the German language as suitable for poetry.

In 1619 Opitz went to Heidelberg, where he became the leader of the school of young poets which at that time made that university town remarkable. Visiting Leiden in the following year he sat at the feet of the famous Dutch lyric poet Daniel Heinsius (1580–1655), whose Lobgesang Jesu Christi and Lobgesang Bacchi he had already translated into alexandrines. At the invitation of Gabriel Bethlen, the lord of Transylvania, he spent a year (1622) as professor of philosophy at the gymnasium of Weißenburg (Alba Iulia). After this he led a wandering life in the service of various territorial nobles.

In 1624 Opitz was appointed councilor to Duke George Rudolf of Liegnitz (Legnica) and Brieg (Brzeg) in Silesia, and in 1625, as reward for a requiem poem composed on the death of Archduke Charles of Austria, was crowned poet laureate by Emperor Ferdinand II, who a few years later ennobled him under the title "von Boberfeld." He was elected a member of the Fruitbearing Society in 1629, and in 1630 he went to Paris, where he made the acquaintance of Hugo Grotius. He settled in 1635 in Gdańsk, where King Władysław IV Vasa of Poland made him his historiographer and secretary. There he died of the plague on 20 August 1639.

Opitz was the head of the so-called First Silesian School of poets, and was during his life regarded as the greatest German poet. Although he would not today be considered a poetical genius, he may justly claim to have been the "father of German poetry" in respect at least of its form; his Buch von der deutschen Poeterey (1624) put an end to the hybridism that had until then prevailed, and established rules for the "purity" of language, style, verse and rhyme.

Opitz's own poems are in accordance with the rigorous rules which he laid down. They are mostly a formal and sober elaboration of carefully considered themes, and contain little beauty and less feeling. To this didactic and descriptive category belong his best poems, Trost-Gedichte in Widerwärtigkeit des Krieges (written 1621, but not published until 1633); Zlatna, oder von der Ruhe des Gemüths (1622); Lob des Feldlebens (1623); Vielgut, oder vom wahren Glück (1629), and Vesuvius (1633). These contain some vivid poetical descriptions, but are in the main treatises in poetical form.

In 1624 Opitz published a collected edition of his poetry under the title Acht Bücher deutscher Poematum (though, owing to a mistake on the part of the printer, there are only five books); his Dafne (1627), to which Heinrich Schütz composed the music, is the earliest German opera. In 1637 (printed at Danzig in 1638) he dedicated the Geistliche Poemata (Religious Poems) to the Duchess of Silesia Der Durchlauchtigen Hochgebornen Fürstin und Frawen/ Frawen Sibyllen Margarethen, gebornen Hertzogin in Schlesien/ zur Lignitz und Briegk: Vermähleten deß Heiligen Röm. Reichs Gräffin von Dönhoff... Dantzig/den6.Tag deß intermonats/im 1637. Jahr. Sibylle Margarethe was the daughter of Dorothea of Brandenburg and the wife of Gerhard Dönhoff, brother of Ernst Magnus Dönhoff and Kasper Dönhoff.

In 1625 he lived in Wittenberg in Saxony.

Besides numerous translations, Opitz edited (1639) Das Annolied, a Middle High German poem of the end of the 11th century, and thus preserved it from oblivion since the original manuscript is now lost. Opitz also wrote a pastoral novel, Schäferei der Nymphe Hercinie (The Idyll of the Nymph Hercinie, 1630).

Opitz died in Danzig on 20 August 1639.
