= Michaelsberg Abbey, Siegburg =

Former Benedictine monastery

Michaelsberg Abbey
- Abtei Michaelsberg
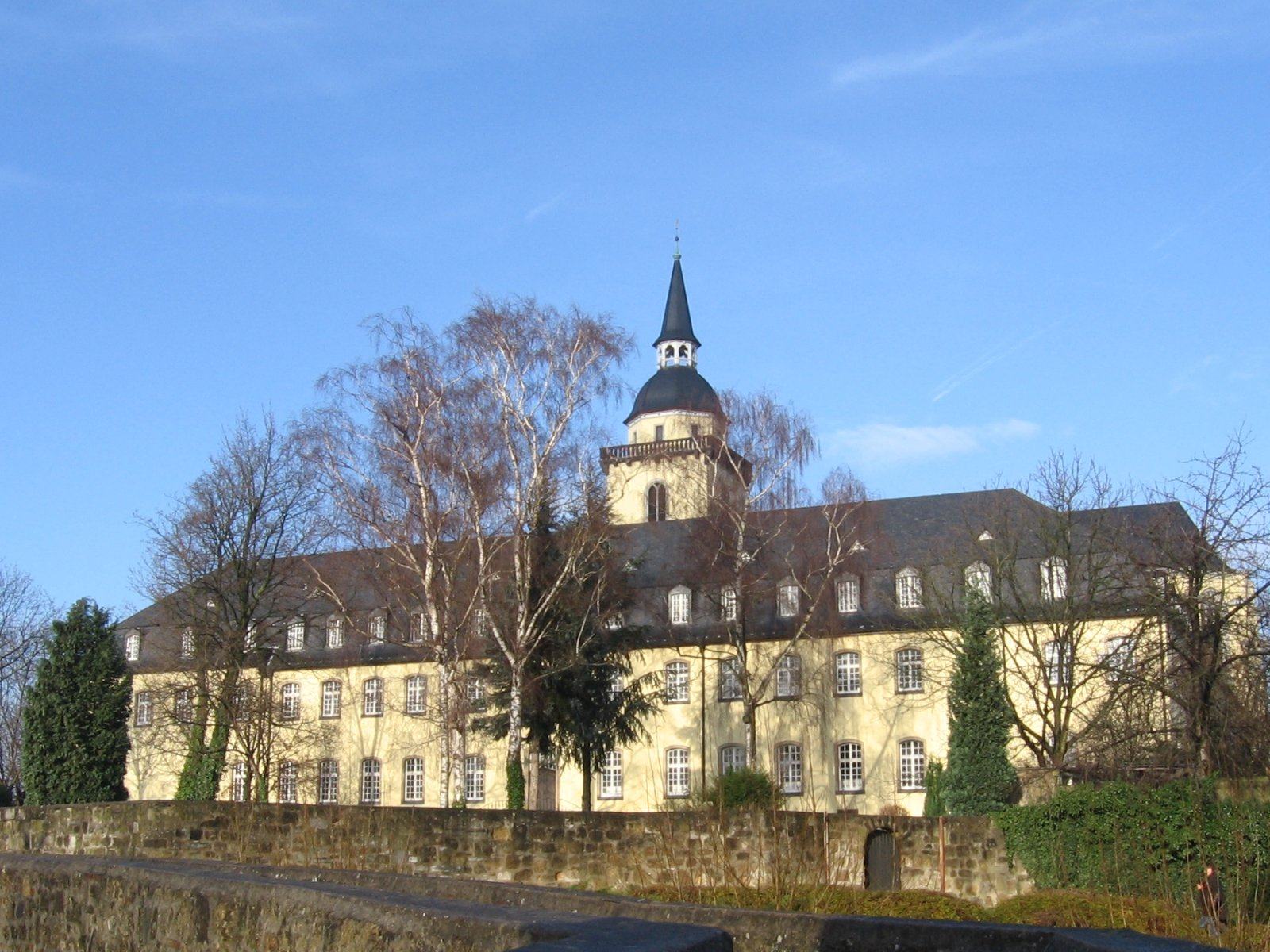
- Michaelsberg Abbey, Siegburg

- Location within North Rhine-Westphalia Location within Germany
- Interactive map of Michaelsberg Abbey

Monastery information
- Other name: Abtei Siegburg/Siegburg Abbey
- Order: Benedictine; Cistercian
- Established: 1064/1914/1945
- Disestablished: 1803/1941/2011

Site
- Coordinates: 50°47′45″N 7°12′39″E

Michaelsberg Abbey (German: Abtei Michaelsberg) is a former monastery of the Benedictine Order, belonging to the Subiaco Congregation (1064–2011). The monastery is situated on the Michaelsberg ("St. Michael's Mount"), about 40 metres (130 ft) above the town of Siegburg. For this reason it is also often known as Siegburg Abbey.

== History ==
=== Foundation ===
The hill called the Michaelsberg, formerly known as the Siegberg, was first inhabited about 800 by the Counts of Auelgau, who built a castle there. In 1064 the Archbishop of Cologne, Anno II of Cologne, founded a monastery there, dedicated to the Archangel Michael, from whom both the mountain and the abbey henceforward took their names. He appointed the monk Erpho (died 1076) as the first abbot. Anno himself died at the abbey in 1075 and was buried there.

Archbishop Anno was canonized in the abbey church on 29 April 1183 by Cardinal Giovanni Conti da Anagni and Bishop Pietro of Luni, acting as papal legates of Pope Lucius III. At this time his remains were translated to the Chapel of St. Anno, which can still be seen in the abbey church. By this time, however, the early spirit of these founders was beginning to dim among the monks. The community had developed a luxurious lifestyle, one which was so open that they were publicly criticized by a nearby Cistercian abbey.

During the 14th century, after a long legal battle, the abbey was recognized as an Imperial abbey (that is, directly subject to the Holy Roman Emperor alone). This led to bitter rivalry, and on occasion even war, with the town of Siegburg. In 1676 the abbey again became subject to the local territorial power. During the period of the Thirty Years' War, the abbey became a center of literary and musical studies.

=== Modern era ===
The abbey was suppressed during the German Mediatisation of 1802–03. Until their resettlement by Cistercian monks on 2 July 1914, the buildings were used for varied purposes, for some time as a barracks, but also at other times as a lunatic asylum and a slaughterhouse. The new monks came from the Abbey of Merkelbeeck in the Netherlands to establish a monastery there again. This was not an easy endeavor, as part of the abbey was soon taken over for use as a military hospital during World War I.

In 1941 the abbey was again dissolved, this time by the Schutzstaffel (SS); the monks were expelled and the buildings commandeered. The buildings were almost completely destroyed by a bombing raid in 1944, although they were in use as a military hospital and flying the flag of the Red Cross. In 1945 the monks who had been expelled four years previously were finally able to return, some from captivity as prisoners of war, others from exile. They had to rebuild the monastery virtually from scratch.

Since 1997 the Edith Stein Retreat House of the Archdiocese of Cologne has operated at this location, using the north wing and also a large part of the west wing of the abbey.

=== Dissolution ===
In 2005 the monastic community of Michaelsberg Abbey consisted of 13 monks and a novice. The financial situation was uncertain and in December 2010 the community voted to close the abbey, effective the following June. At that time the remaining 12 monks left the abbey for various other monasteries, and the abbey was transferred to the Archdiocese. The abbey church (except the crypt) remains open daily to the public.

It was announced in 2012 by the Archdiocese that six friars of the Indian province of the Discalced Carmelites would open a priory in a part of the former abbey after renovation of the building.

== Alcohol production ==
In 1504 production of the abbey's liqueur, Siegburger Abtei-Likör, began. After an interruption, production was resumed in 1952. In 2004 a line of beer was also brewed here, called Michel.

Both products ceased to be produced with the closing of the abbey.
