= Irish philosophy =

Philosophical tradition of the Irish people

Irish philosophy refers to the philosophical tradition of the Irish people. One of the most prominent Irish philosophers is British empiricist and subjective idealist Bishop Berkeley.

== Medieval philosophy ==
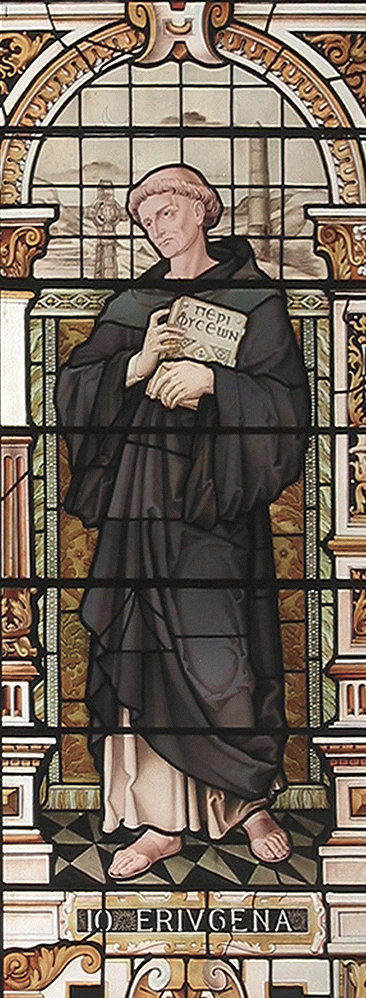
John Scotus Eriugena

Due to the learning that flourished in Ireland between the 5th and 9th centuries, a 19th-century adage calls it "the land of saints and scholars". De mirabilibus sacrae scripturae (c. 655) provided natural explanations for miracles and was written by an anonymous Irish author known as Augustine Hibernicus.

=== 9th century ===
John Scotus Eriugena (c. 800 – c. 877) was a mystical Neoplatonist from Ireland, who translated and made commentaries upon the work of Pseudo Dionysius the Areopagite. He succeeded Charlemagne's scholar Alcuin of York as head of the Palace School at Aachen. (Note: Another Irishman in Charlemagne's court was Joseph Scottus.) British philosopher Bertrand Russell dubbed him "the most astonishing person of the ninth century". The Stanford Encyclopedia of Philosophy states that he is "the most significant Irish intellectual of the early monastic period. He is generally recognized to be both the outstanding philosopher (in terms of originality) of the Carolingian era and of the whole period of Latin philosophy stretching from Boethius to Anselm".

Eriugena is best known for having written De Divisione Naturae ("The Division of Nature"), or Periphyseon, which has been called the "final achievement" of ancient philosophy, a work which "synthesizes the philosophical accomplishments of fifteen centuries".

The Norse Vikings made their way into Ireland during the mid-ninth century. Those already occupying the land, Irish monks, were driven out of their monasteries by force. Sedulius Scottus (fl. 840–860) was among them, and his search for refuge led him to the city of Liège. His treatise De Rectoribus Christianis is a commentary on Porphyry's Isagoge, or an introduction to the logic of Aristotle.

=== 10th century to Reformation ===
Marianus Scotus of Mainz (1028–1082) was an Irish monk and chronicler who traveled to Germany. There was also the similarly named Marianus Scotus of Regensburg.

Bishop Gillebert (c. 1070–1145) knew Anselm. Peter of Ireland (c. 1200– c. 1260) also wrote a commentary on Isagoge. He taught logic and natural philosophy at the University of Naples to Italian philosopher Thomas Aquinas. (Note: At least according to Aquinas biographer Guglielmo Tocco. Others doubt this claim.)

Richard FitzRalph (c. 1300–1360) influenced English philosopher John Wycliffe, who influenced German philosopher Martin Luther and the Reformation. FitzRalph is notable for his theory of dominion, that authority over property is justified by divine grace.

== Modern philosophy ==
=== Christian philosophy ===
The Reformation in Ireland was introduced at the behest of King Henry VIII of England, with limited success.

Church of Ireland philosopher James Ussher (1581–1656) wrote the chronology that sought to establish the time and date of the creation as "the entrance of the night preceding the 23rd day of October ... the year before Christ 4004"; that is, around 6 pm on 22 October 4004 BC, per the proleptic Julian calendar.

John Punch (1603–1661) was a Catholic scholastic philosopher. Punch was ultimately responsible for the now classic formulation of Ockham's Razor, in the shape of the Latin phrase entia non sunt multiplicanda praeter necessitatem, "entities are not to be multiplied unnecessarily." Michael Moore (c. 1639–1726) became the first Catholic provost of Trinity College, Dublin in 1689.

=== British empiricism ===
A heavy influence on British empiricism and the Enlightenment was the work of natural philosopher Sir Isaac Newton and the philosophy of Newtonianism, who published his Philosophiæ Naturalis Principia Mathematica in 1686, which included his laws of motion, introducing classical mechanics in physics.

A member of London's Royal Society, Robert Boyle (1627–1691) was a noted Irish scientist or natural philosopher known as a pioneer of the scientific method and the first modern chemist. Since scholarship in the 1990s, Boyle has emerged as a significant figure in early modern philosophy, not only through his influence, but as a thinker in his own right. Boyle rejected the scholastic hylomorphism inherited from Aristotle. He also criticized German hermeticist Paracelsus in The Sceptical Chymist (1661). (Note: The Brafferton building at the College of William & Mary, the oldest in the Southern United States, was built in 1723 with funds from Boyle's estate.)

William Brouncker, 2nd Viscount Brouncker was another member of the Royal Society.

==== Molyneux and Locke ====
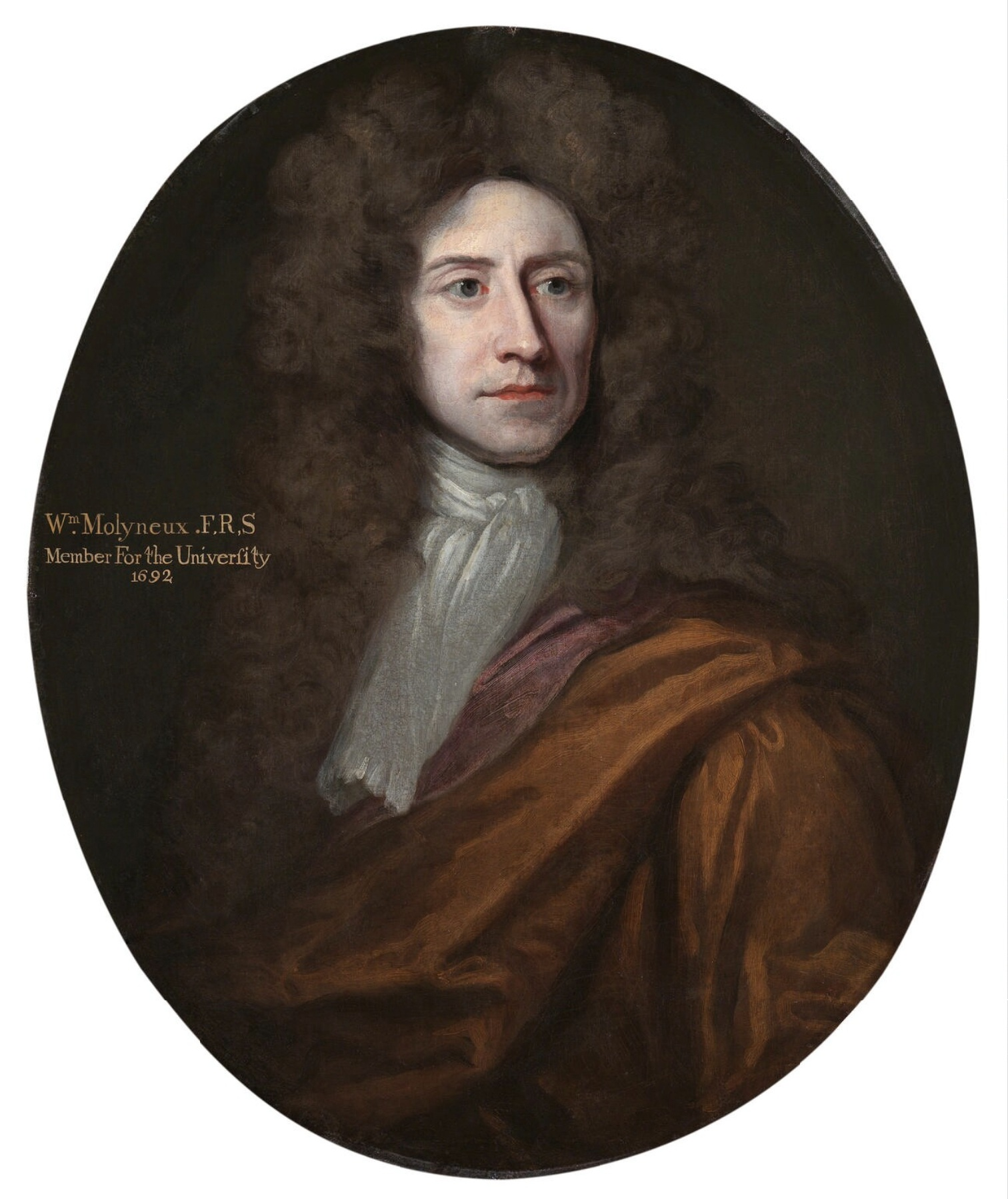
William Molyneux promoted the Enlightenment in Ireland.

William Molyneux (1656–1698) promoted Enlightenment philosophy in Ireland and founded the Dublin Philosophical Society in 1683. Molyneux wrote The Case of Ireland to reassert the independence of the Irish Parliament in the face of English measures to suppress Irish exports. The Molyneux problem was developed in correspondence with English philosopher John Locke. The problem can be stated in brief, "if a man born blind can feel the differences between shapes such as spheres and cubes, could he, if given the ability to see, distinguish those objects by sight alone?"

==== Deism ====
Locke influenced the opponents of deism like English philosophers Samuel Clarke (1675–1729) and Joseph Butler (1692–1752), who influenced conservative and Counter-Enlightenment figure Edmund Burke (1729–1797), writer of A Philosophical Enquiry into the Origin of Our Ideas of the Sublime and Beautiful and Reflections on the Revolution in France. Burke distinguishes the beautiful and the sublime, and opposed the French Revolution.

One of the most famous deists was John Toland (1670–1722). His first, and best known work, Christianity Not Mysterious (1696), opposed hierarchy in both church and state. In Ireland, copies were burned by the public hangman, and he was forced to flee the country never to return.

James Arbuckle (1700–1742) and Philip Skelton (1707–1787) were later influential Irish, Protestant philosophers. Arbuckle was a critic of Gulliver's Travels author Jonathan Swift (1667–1745). Skelton published Ophiomaches, or Deism Revealed. (Note: He also published in the Philosophical Transactions an extraordinary development of caterpillars seen in Ireland in 1737.)

==== Berkeley ====
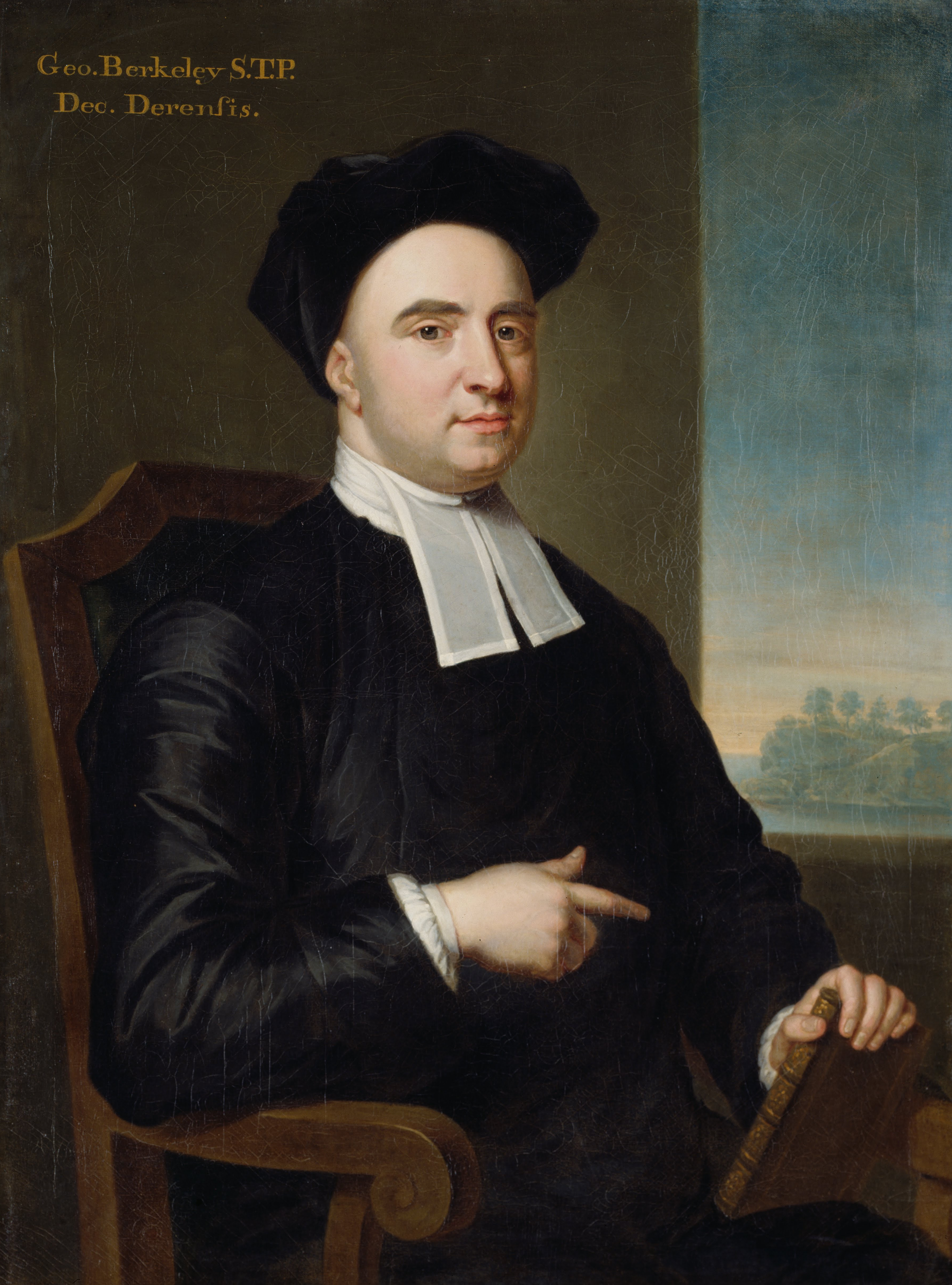
Bishop Berkeley

Locke is one of the three traditional "British empiricists" along with the Irish Bishop Berkeley and Scottish David Hume. Berkeley was the Bishop of Cloyne and an empiricist and subjective idealist. The question If a tree falls in a forest and no one is around to hear it, does it make a sound? is taken to exemplify the thought of Berkeley. Berkeley is famous for his motto "esse est percipi aut percipere", or otherwise, "to exist is to be perceived, or to perceive". This means that there are no things other than ideas and the minds that house them. There is no such thing as matter or a mind-independent entity.

Many of Berkeley's most important ideas were first put forth in A Treatise Concerning the Principles of Human Knowledge (1710), a work which was critical of Locke's philosophy. Berkeley agreed with Locke that there was an outside world which caused the ideas within the mind, but Berkeley sought to prove that the outside world was also composed solely of ideas. This world was given regularity by some other force, which Berkeley concluded was the mind of God.

==== Hutcheson ====
Francis Hutcheson, a major figure of the Scottish Enlightenment, was in fact from Ireland, and advocated utilitarianism and moral sense theory. Hutcheson was an early advocate of animal rights, and an influence on Swift.

== 19th century ==
English utilitarian John Stuart Mill was highly influenced by Berkeley.

=== Socialism ===
William Thompson and Anna Wheeler were influenced by utilitarian thought and penned the book Appeal of One Half of the Human Race, Women, Against the Pretensions of the Other Half, Men, to Retain them in Political, and Hence in Civil and Domestic, Slavery. Thompson was described by Marxist James Connolly as the "first Irish socialist".

=== Logic ===
British philosophy in the nineteenth century saw a revival of logic in reaction to the anti-logical aspects of British empiricism. This was started by Richard Whately (1787 – 1863), who wrote Elements of Logic (1826). The major figure of this period is mathematician George Boole. Boole was first professor of mathematics at Queen's College, Cork. He is best known as the author of The Laws of Thought (1854), which contains Boolean algebra. Boolean logic, essential to computer programming, is credited with helping to lay the foundations for the Information Age.

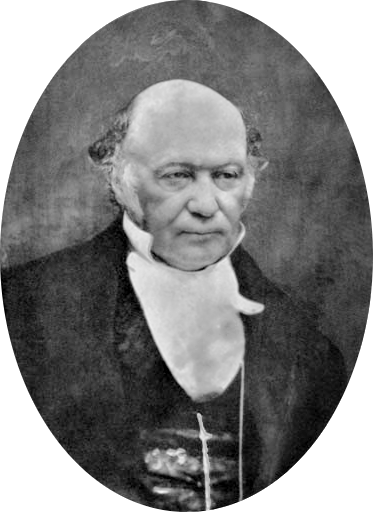
William Rowan Hamilton was influenced by Kant's philosophy.

Another figure of this period was British mathematician and laws namesake Augustus De Morgan, who valued Berkeley's criticisms of early calculus in The Analyst. Irish physicist and mathematician William Rowan Hamilton often exchanged letters with De Morgan.

=== British idealism ===
Samuel Taylor Coleridge introduced Kant's philosophy and German idealism to Britain. William Rowan Hamilton was a "devoted Coleridgean", and showed affinity with Kant's views on space and time. Dublin scholars Thomas Kingsmill Abbott, W. H. S. Monck, John Bernard, and J. P. Mahaffy disseminated Kant's philosophy in Ireland. Abbott's translation of the Critique of Practical Reason remained the standard English version of the text well into the 20th century.

British philosophy was influenced by Hegel's absolute idealism from the mid-nineteenth century to the early twentieth century, called British idealism. Scotsman James Hutchison Stirling's study of Hegel influenced the movement. Aesthete Oscar Wilde was influenced by British idealism.

=== Nationalism ===
The 19th century saw the Celtic Revival. W. B. Yeats was influential on the Irish nationalism movement. Douglas Hyde delivered the speech "The Necessity for De-Anglicising Ireland" in 1892 and the Gaelic League was founded shortly after.

== Contemporary philosophy ==
In the 20th century, Iris Murdoch is a notable writer on ethics. Philip Pettit is a contemporary political philosopher. Terence Irwin is a noted scholar of ancient philosophy, James McEvoy was a famous scholar of medieval phiilosophy, and Desmond Clarke was a noted scholar of Descartes.

The Polish philosopher and pioneer of many-valued logic Jan Łukasiewicz taught in Ireland following World War II.

Maurice O'Connor Drury was a student of analytic philosopher Ludwig Wittgenstein. "Con" Drury was the author of one book, The Danger of Words (1973). Ray Monk described the work as "though much neglected" perhaps "the most truly Wittgensteinian work published by any of Wittgenstein’s students." John Oulton Wisdom was the cousin of Wittgenstein student John Wisdom. The only book review that Wittgenstein ever published was a scathing review of Peter Coffey's The Science of Logic.

Maria Baghramian and William Lyons are contemporary Irish analytic philosophers. However, there are also several Irish continental philosophers such as William Desmond, Niall Keane, Richard Kearney, and Brian O'Connor.

== See also ==
- British philosophy
- Scottish philosophy
