= Scotus =

Scotus, SCOTUS or Scottus may refer to:

- Supreme Court of the United States
- Scotus Academy, Edinburgh, Scotland
- SCOTUSblog
- Scotus Central Catholic High School, Nebraska
- Scotus College, Glasgow, Scotland

== People named Scotus or Scottus ==
- Aaron Scotus (died 1052), Irish abbot
- Marianus Scotus of Regensburg (died c. 1088), Irish saint
- David the Scot (died c. 1138), Bishop of Bangor
- David Scotus (died 1139), Irish historian
- John Duns Scotus (died 1308), Scottish theologian and philosopher
- Haddingtonus Scotus (1467–1550), Scottish philosopher, see John Major (philosopher)
- Joseph Scottus (died near 800), Irish deacon, scholar, diplomat, poet, and ecclesiastic
- John Scotus Eriugena (c. 815–877), Irish theologian
- John Scotus (bishop of Dunkeld) (12th century), Bishop of St Andrews and Dunkeld
- John Scotus (bishop of Mecklenburg) (c. 990 – 1066), Bishop of Mecklenburg and Glasgow
- Marianus Scotus of Mainz (1028 – c. 1082), Irish monk
- Marianus Scotus of Regensburg (died about 1088), Irish abbot of St Peter's at Ratisbon (Regensburg)
- Marius Scotus (8th–9th century), a Scottish paladin of Charlemagne, see Ruspoli family
- Michael Scot (Latin: Michael Scotus; 1175 – c. 1232), mathematician and scholar
- Sedulius Scottus (9th century), Irish teacher, grammarian and Scriptural commentator

== See also ==
- Scot, British people
- Scoti or Scotti, Latin name for the Gaels
- Scott (disambiguation)
