= Great St. Martin Church, Cologne =

Great Saint Martin Church
- Klosterkirche Groß Sankt Martin
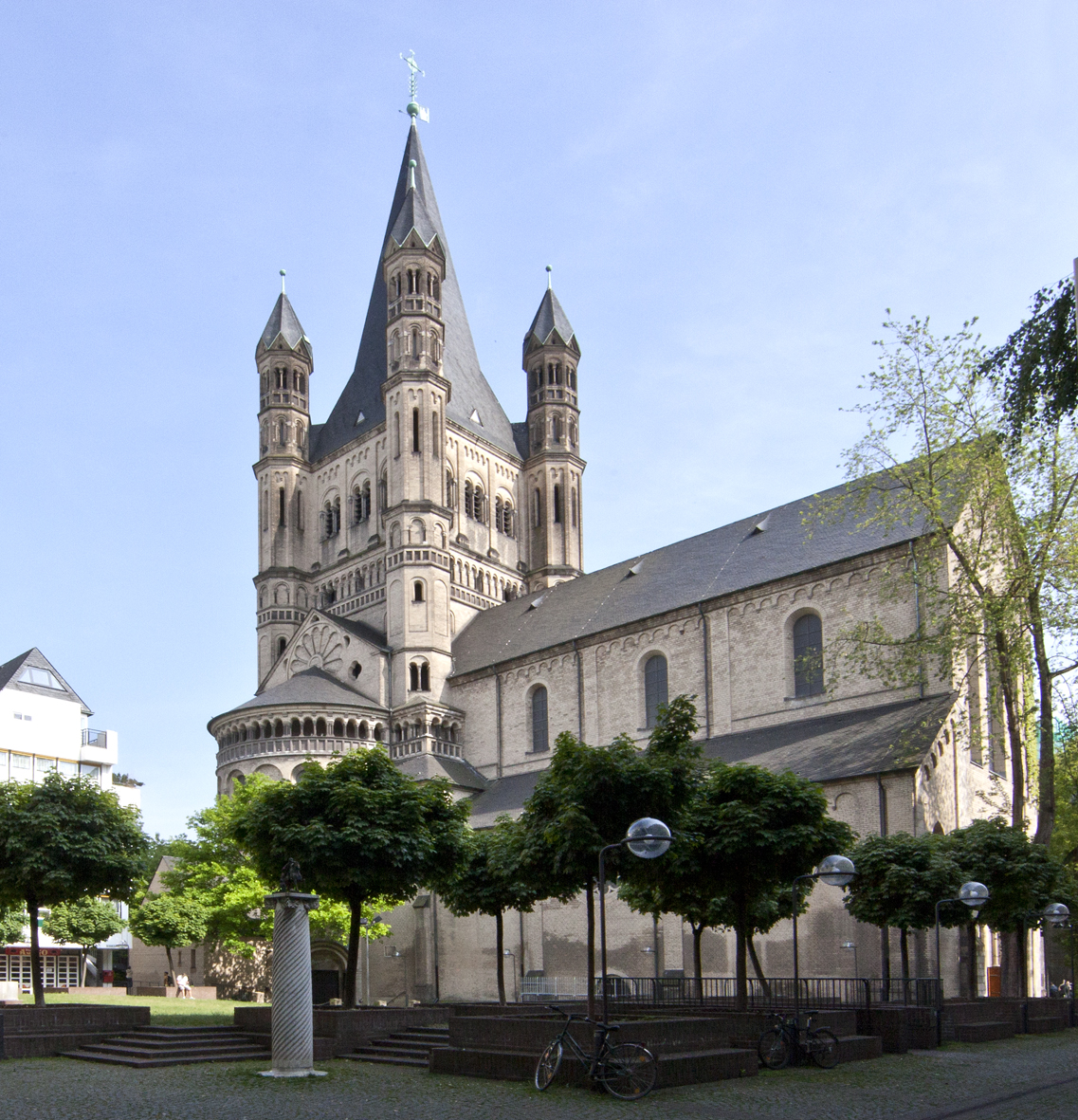
- Great Saint Martin Church
- 50°56′19″N 6°57′42″E
- Location: Innenstadt, Cologne, Germany
- Denomination: Catholic
- Website: www.romanische-kirchen-koeln.de

History
- Founded: c.960 AD
- Dedication: St. Martinus

Specifications
- Length: 50 metres (160 ft)
- Height: 75 metres (246 ft)

The Great Saint Martin Church (German: Groß Sankt Martin, mostly shortened to Groß St. Martin, pronounced [ˈɡʁoːs ˌzaŋkt ˈmaʁtiːn] or [- maʁˈtiːn]; Kölsch: Jruhß Zint Määtes [ˈjʁús ˌtsɪ̂nt ˈmɛ́ːtəs]) is a Romanesque Catholic church in Cologne, Germany. Its foundations (c. 960 AD) rest on remnants of a Roman chapel, built on what was then an island in the Rhine. The church was later transformed into a Benedictine monastery. The current buildings, including a soaring crossing tower that is a landmark of Cologne's Old Town, were erected between 1150–1250. The architecture of its eastern end forms a triconch or trefoil plan, consisting of three apses around the crossing, similar to that at St. Maria im Kapitol. The church was badly damaged in World War II; restoration work was completed in 1985.

Great St. Martin Church in December, 2014

As of 2009 Great Saint Martin is being used by a branch of the Monastic Fraternities of Jerusalem and is open for visits again.

== History ==
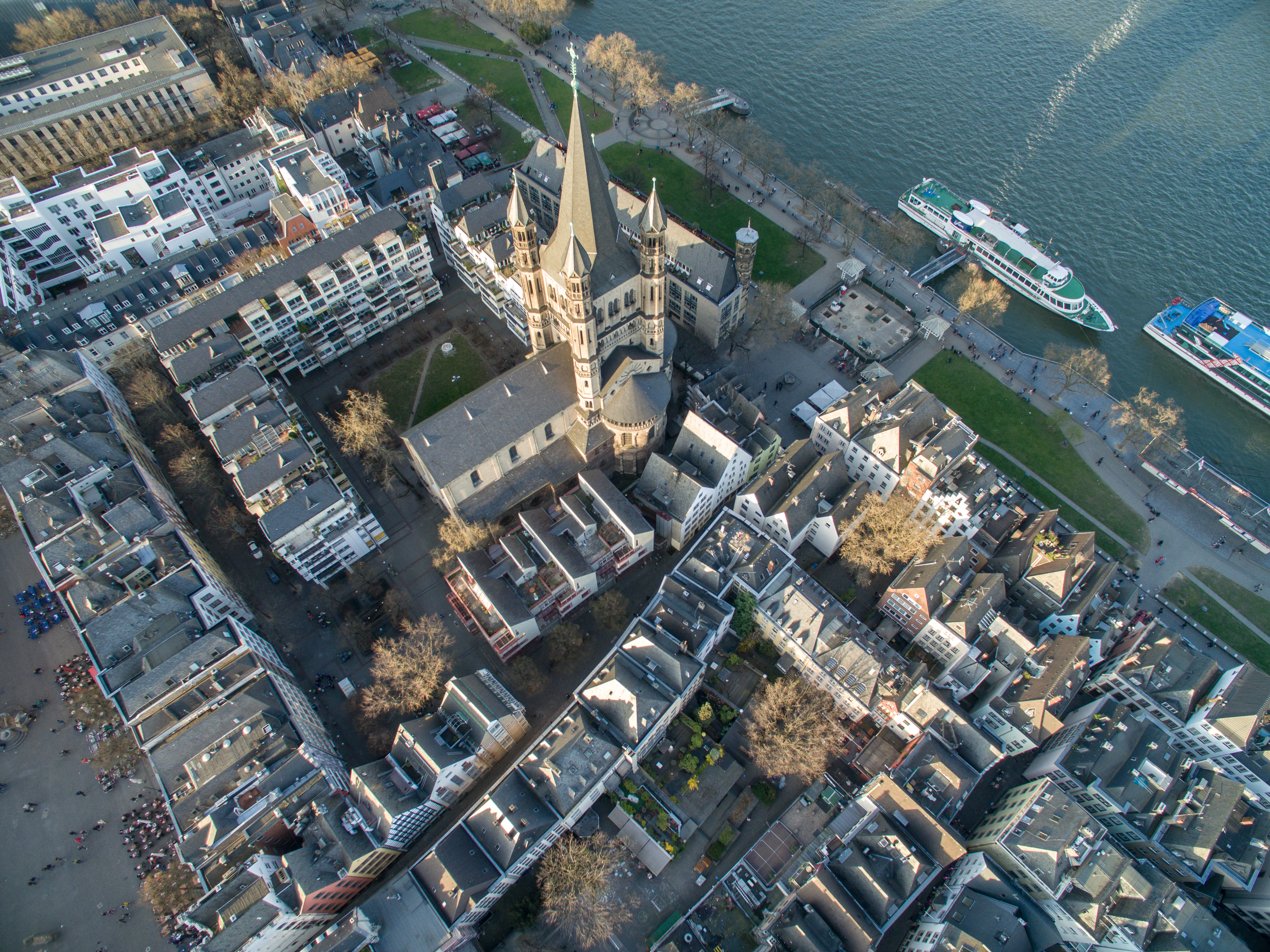
Aerial view of the Great St. Martin Church, Cologne

The story of Great St. Martin is inextricably connected to that of the Benedictine abbey, located at the church for most of its history. A few documents from the time of the building have survived, and it is from these that knowledge of its founding comes. This information is also supported by archeological findings onsite and the study of the style of building and its ornamentation.

=== Apocryphal histories ===
The Cologne text Aedidius Gelenius, a catalogue of local saints, mentions in the 1645 edition a possible origin for the church in pre-Carolingian times. The missionaries Viro and Plechelmus, who later were affiliated with the Kaiserswerth cloister, are said to have come to the Rhine, to found monasteries and churches. They were said to be sponsored by the mayor of the palace Pepin of Herstal and his wife Plectrude, situating their work during the years 670–714. It is possible that these two founded a church that would later become Great St. Martin.

Theories of the Church’s pre-Carolingian beginning are supported by the Chronicon Sancti Martini Coloniensis, which up until the end of the 19th century was regarded as a valid historical source for Churches and Abbeys in Cologne. According to it, Great St. Martin was founded as a chapel in 690, and was transformed into a monastery by Viro, Plechelmus and Otger in 708. The Chronicon provides an unbroken history of the abbey and the events leading to its partial destruction by Saxons in 778, while Charlemagne was fighting in Spain. Other events included in this history include a papal visit from Leo III and the damage from the Normans in 846 and 882.

Writing in 1900, Otto Opperman, a scholar in Germany, proved that this chronicle is a false history, concocted by Oliver Legipont, a Benedictine Monk residing at Great St. Martin’s in 1730. Other theories, including one that suggests the Church was built in Frankish times (during the 5th to 9th centuries) are similarly unsupported by evidence and likely apocryphal.

=== Foundation and building of the monastery in the 10th and 11th Centuries ===
The Lorsch Codex, which provides a more trustworthy source of information, mentions the founding of the church by archbishop Bruno the Great (953–965) as a men’s choir house in honor of Martin of Tours. Brun also lists the church in his records and mentions the donation of the relics of St. Eliphius, who was the second named patron of the church. These relics were later transferred to Toul.

Later chronicles written by Johann Koelhoff the younger in 1499 mention that Archbishop Warin of Cologne (976–985) had renovated the Church and placed Minnborinus of Cologne in charge of it (see Hiberno-Scottish mission). Ebergar (985–999) wrote that with donations in 989, the Church was transformed into a monastery for Benedictine monks from Ireland. They included Kilian of Cologne (died 1003), Helias of Cologne (died 1040), Aaron Scotus (died 1052), and Molanus (died 1061).

During the 11th century, these Irish residents were gradually replaced by local monks. This is due to the fact that archbishop Pilgrim of Cologne was averse to their presence, and applied himself to their removal. As a result, the last Irish abbot, Arnold of St. Martin's, died there in 1103.

The Vita Annonis reports that Archbishop Anno II (1056–1075) was given a vision by St. Eliphius of two towers at the church, and that this vision was the inspiration for the towers later erected over the east choir.

=== Romanesque rebuilding in the 12th and 13th centuries ===
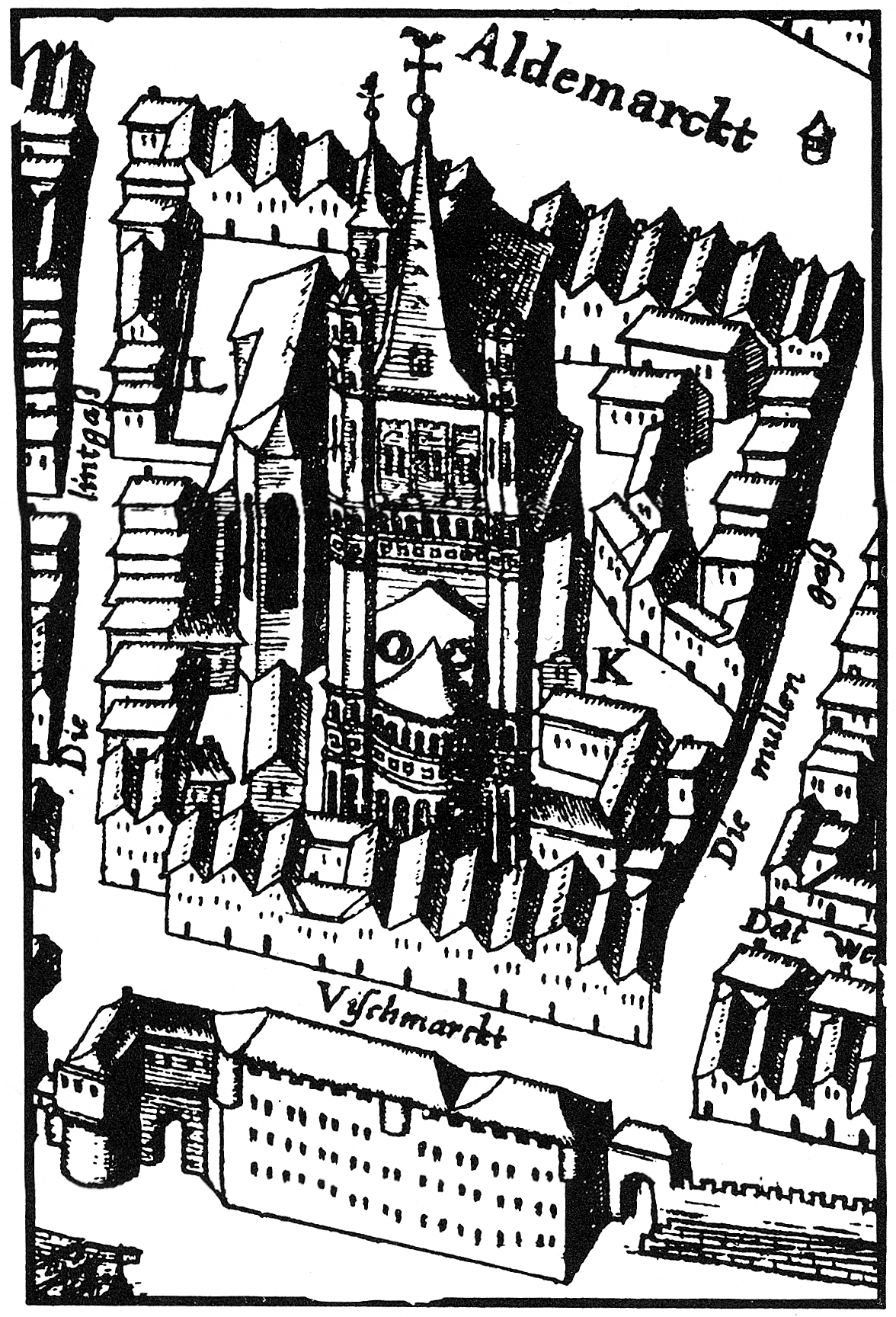
Section of Cologne city map from 1571, showing Great St. Martin

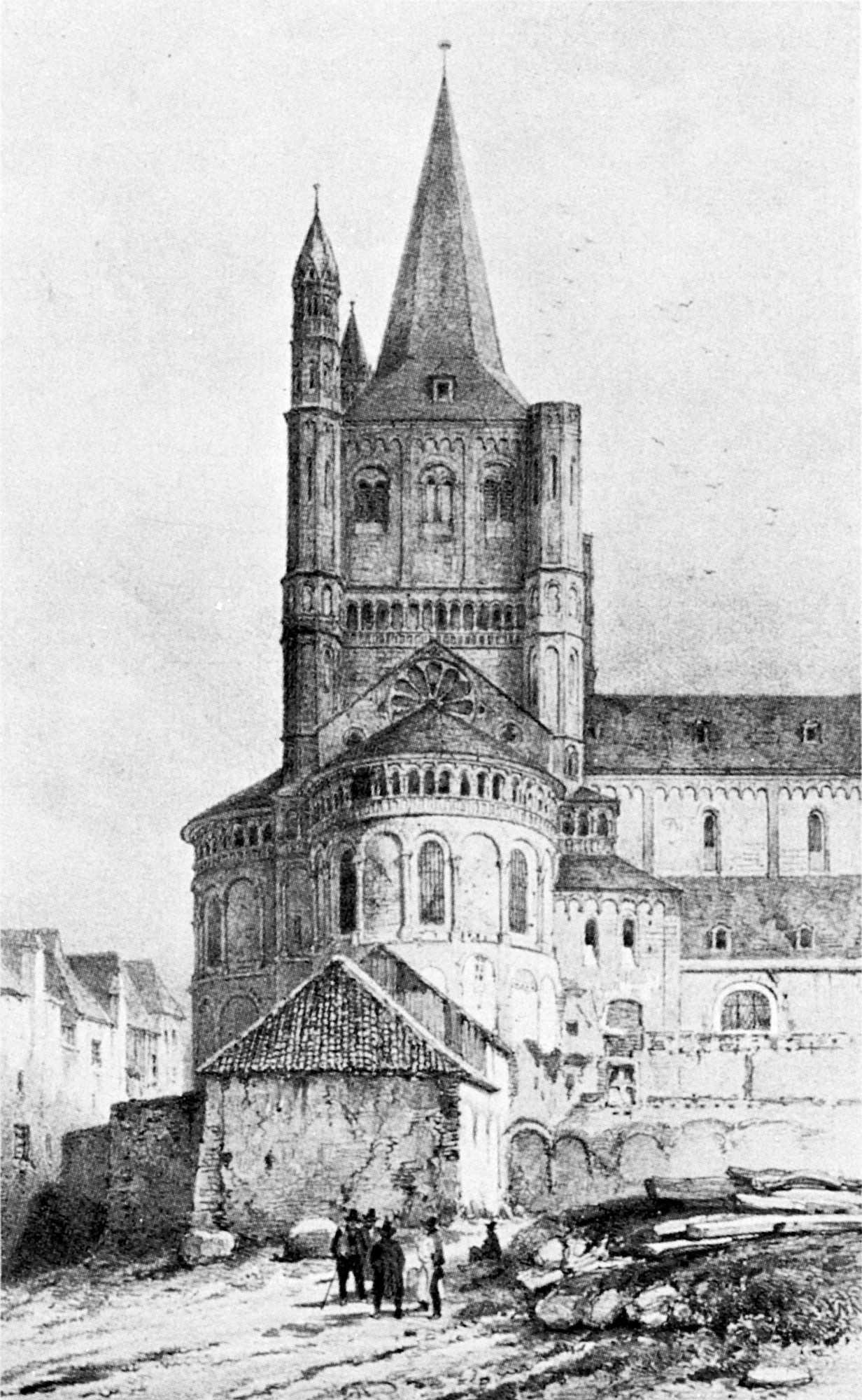
An early 19th-century view of the north side of the church, after the demolition of the abbey, reveals the triapsidal Romanesque structure of the eastern end.

In 1150, a fire destroyed much of Cologne. The abbey at the site of Great St. Martin was caught in the conflagration, and although the specific damages are not known, it is supposed that the entire Church was destroyed. The Archbishop of Cologne Philipp I. von Heinsberg sanctified the new building in 1172, and the first phase of construction, the tri-apsidal structure was built, with three round apses meeting in the shape of a cross. This is the only element of the church still present today. The eastern end of the nave was completed before a further fire in 1185, as well as aisles on the Southside. At the northern apse, two Benedictine chapels were later added, built over the ruins of the previous abbey buildings.

More information concerning the construction comes from the tenure of Abbott Simon (1206–1211). The abbot’s brother bequeathed in his final will money towards the purchase of new stone for the abbey, indicating some construction was ongoing.

In the middle of the 13th century, new walls for the three apses were completed, with larger windows. These provided a sought-after lightness to the interior. The nave was also made five meters longer, and the atrium in the west was built.

=== Developments from the 14th to 17th century ===
After the completion of the church in the 13th century, few modifications to the form of the church were undertaken. Most significant during this period were the various renovations needed for the four surrounding towers.

In 1378, fire destroyed the roofs of the four towers, which were repaired with help from saved financial resources. A strong storm in 1434 provided later troubles. Three of the four gables of the towers were thrown down. One of the gables struck a nearby fish market, two others fell directly onto the vault over the main altar. The vault was later repaired, and a commemorative bell dated with the year 1436 was hung.

Reforms under abbots Jakob von Wachendorp (1439–1454) and Adam Meyer (1454–1499) provided a stronger financial footing for the Benedictine abbey. From this the inner decoration of the church was embellished, including figures from the altar, installed in 1509, that are still present today.

The unstable construction of a western flanking tower resulted in the destruction of it and a nearby chapel in 1527. The chapel would later be torn down, and neither it nor the tower was rebuilt. Also during this period, the interior of Great St. Martin was decorated with medieval altars, which would later be replaced with newer furnishings in the 17th century.

=== 18th century Baroque and Classical Influences ===
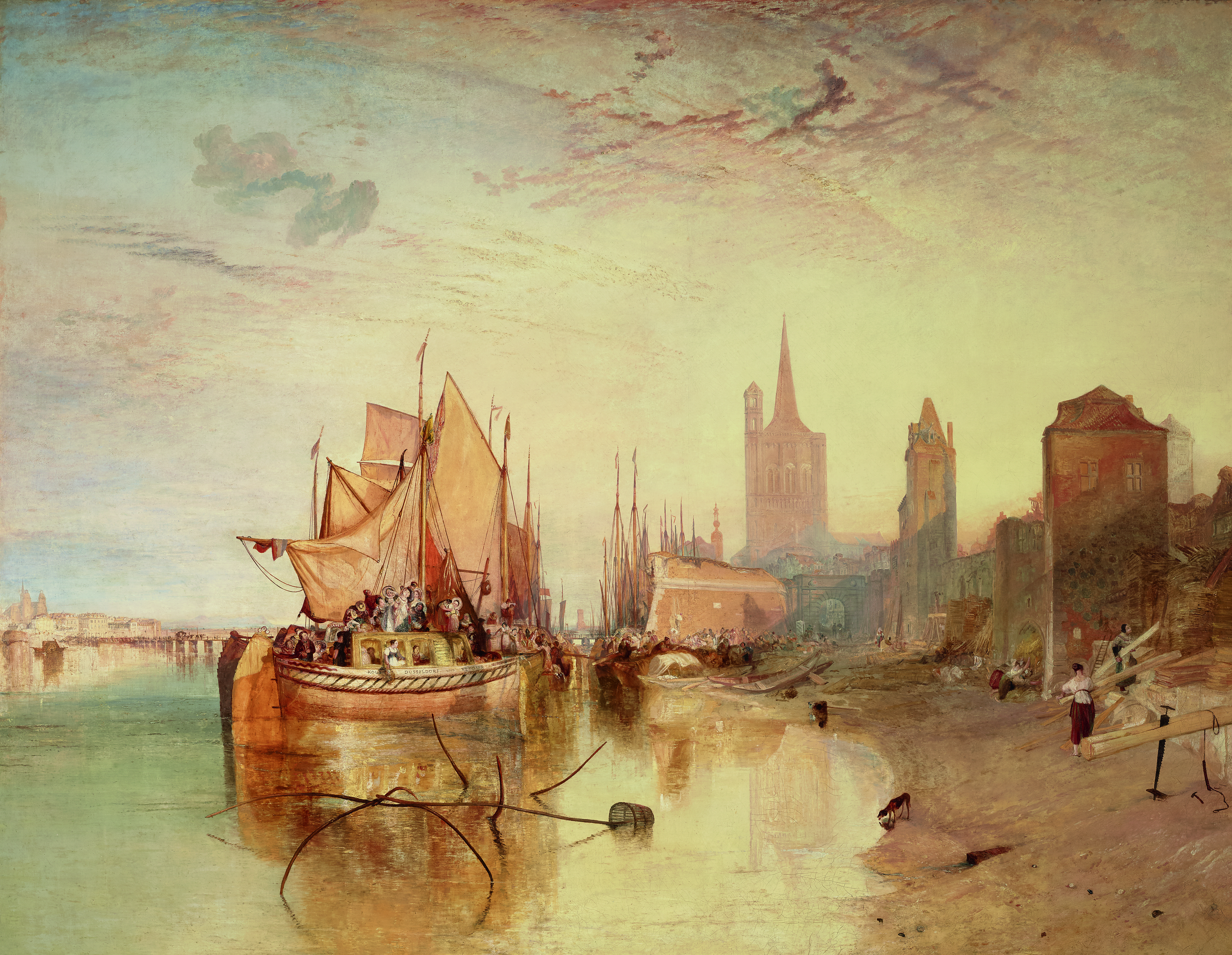
Cologne, the Arrival of a Packet Boat in the Evening (1826) by the British artist Turner depicts the Church on the right

In 1707, the decaying interior walls of Great Saint Martin were repaired and refurbished, remaining faithful to the previous design of the Church. Heinrich Obladen, then the abbot of Great Saint Martin, also purchased a new, larger organ for the church. New adornments for the Church took on a Baroque style, including golden bands for the pillars, dome and walls, which added to the interior luminescence of the Church.

In the second half of the 18th century, a number of small changes were made to the interior construction and environment. Abbott Franz Spix, overseeing the abbey in 1741–1759, raised the area of the altar and laid it further back in the apse. His goal was to embellish its appearance for the holy mass. Through these efforts, the old crypt was demolished and the columns and pillars were now prevented from jutting out at their bases.

Around forty years later, at the end of the 18th century, Ferdinand Franz Wallraf saw that the Church was embellished with new adornments appropriate to the style of the age. Influenced by the beginnings of Classicism, the altar and pulpit took on a new, simpler appearance. The high altar retained its opulence, albeit with a simpler Greco-Roman painting influences.

These changes caused controversy with the 19th-century Catholic renewal movement, who said that these parts of the Church’s adornment should be removed, on the grounds that they were too pagan in theme.

In the late 18th century, the ramshackle northwestern tower was taken down. For this reason, pictures taken before the middle of the 19th century show the church with only two towers on the east side.

=== Secularization and restoration in the 19th century ===
During the French revolutionary era of the 1780s–90s, several territories near France, including Cologne, were captured by the revolutionary army. In October 1794, the city of Cologne was captured and occupied for the next 20 years. This occupation put a definite end to the medieval traditions of the city, and began a strong anti-clerical movement in its place. As a result, the archbishopric in Cologne was ended in 1801, and the Cologne Cathedral was designated as a normal parish church.

The monastery at Great Saint Martin was disbanded in 1802, and the remaining 21 monks were obliged to find other places to live. Only 11 would be able to find positions as priests in Cologne. In the following years, Abbott Felix Ohoven would preside over Great Saint Martin as parish priest. Starting in 1808, the deserted abbey building functioned as living quarters for French veterans. It would later be demolished, with the building materials utilized in other parts of the city.

In 1843, the city of Cologne dedicated finances to the restoration and recovery of the church. The sacristy was restored in the north apse, following the original designs. Four years later, the building of the two missing towers was begun, initiated by Heinrich Nagelschmidt, who also created a plan for the full restoration of the church. The city of Cologne covered half of the restoration costs, said to be around 32,000 talers. In 1875, Great Saint Martin received a new roof, newly built western gables, a new window in the south wall, and finally, the completion of its two missing towers.

The interior of the church was also restored. August Essenwein, director of the Germanic Museum in Nurnberg, was entrusted with this task, and sought to return the decorative elements to authentic medieval designs. Essenwein knew that achieving his full plans for the interior would not be likely, given resource and time constraints, and therefore drew up conceptual plans for each part of the church. Under his plans, the interior of the church was decorated with a variety of themes from the new and old testaments.

The only remaining major changes to the building in the 19th century occurred in 1892, when the east side of the Basilica was renovated to better show the cloverleaf design of the choir. A new roof of this area was replaced two years later.

=== World War II damage ===
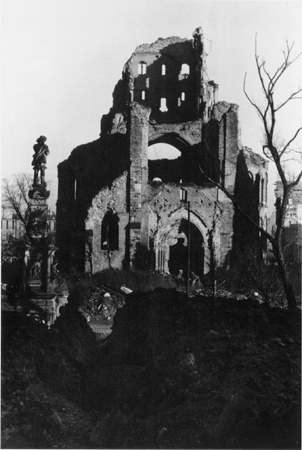
Great St. Martin in 1946

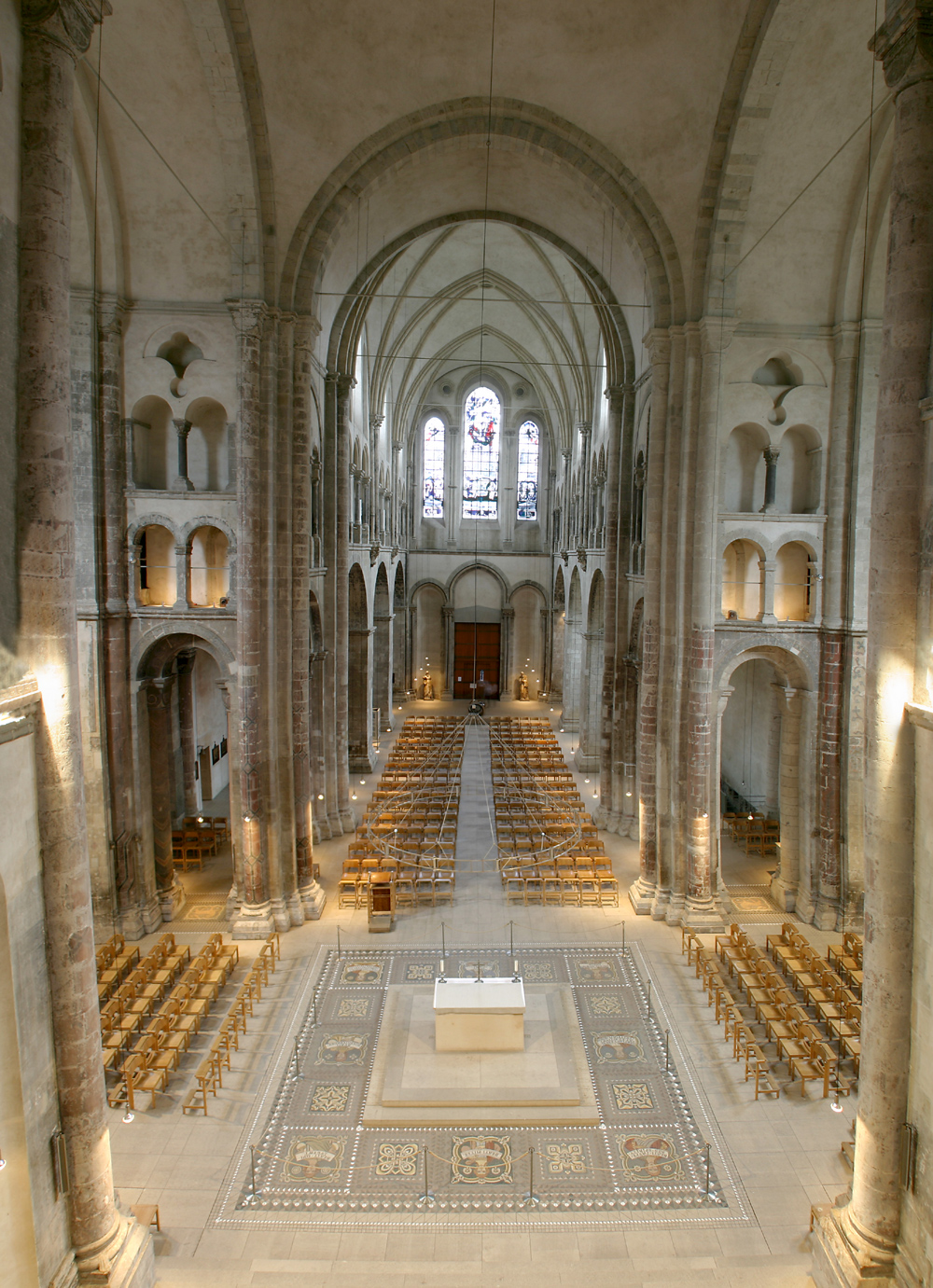
The modern restored interior of Great St. Martin

Great Saint Martin's was badly damaged by RAF bombing during World War II. On the night of May 30, 1942, the tower and nave of the church were burnt to the ground. The sacristy building and north apse were also destroyed. In the following year, during one of the heaviest bombardments of the war, the chapel of St. Benedict on the northern side was destroyed.

During the bombing of January 1945, the triforiums of all three apses were destroyed. At the same time, the foundation of the central tower sustained a direct hit. In the final bombardment by Allied forces, on March 2, 1945, the city received its heaviest damage. Almost ninety-five percent of the buildings in the old city were damaged, and at Great Saint Martin, all of the ceilings in the church were destroyed, or very badly damaged.

=== Later building and restoration ===
In post-war years, the question of whether the church should be restored and how it should be restored was the subject of debate.

A series of public lectures were held in 1946/47, under the theme "What happens to the Cologne Churches?". These lectures involved artists, politicians, architects and restorers, and mirrored public debates on the issue. In spite of some public scepticism, restoration work began in 1948. By 1954, the walls and supports for the apses of the church, with their dwarf galleries, were completely rebuilt. In 1955, the nave was begun, and was completed with a new roof in 1971. In 1965, the exterior form of the church with its four towers was restored.

Between 1982 and 1984, new flooring was laid according to the designs Essenwein made in the 19th century. When the interior restorations were completed in 1985, the church was opened to worshippers, the first such opening in forty years. The altar was consecrated by Archbishop Joseph Höffner, who installed holy relics of Bridget of Sweden, Sebastianus and Engelbert of Cologne, in its sepulchre.

As of 2009, Great Saint Martin Church is being used by a branch of the Monastic Fraternities of Jerusalem and is open for visits again.

== Archeological Investigation ==
Great St Martin’s is located at the site of one of the original Rhine islands, situated east of the site of the Ancient Roman Praetorium. The island is no longer separate. When the site underneath the church was excavated in the years 1965-66, an investigation revealed that the earliest building dates from the first century, and was 76 meters long and 71.5 meters wide. The inner room was 55.7 by 43.8 meters large, and held a mysterious shallow area used to store water, measuring 34 x 17.2 meters. This is notable because no similar structures from this period, North of the Alps have yet been found. Because no other information about the use of the building has been passed down, only conjectures can be offered as to the function of the pool. One possibility is that the building was used for recreation, and that the water storage area was a swimming pool. It is also possible that the pool was used to store live fish, to keep them fresh. A further theory posits that the site was a sacred Roman precinct or temple.

Sometime in the middle of the second century, the pool was filled in, and accompanying buildings to the south, east and west were built. The location of these buildings, directly on the banks of the Rhine, as well as their structure, indicates use as storage, for market goods shipped along the river.

The storehouse on the site of the church was used after antiquity. Archeological excavation showed that at three separate times, a new floor was built, always on top of the older material. It is not clear whether any of these renovations stem from Roman or later Medieval periods. However, in one layer of the floor, shards of Pingsdorfer ceramic were discovered, suggesting that it was added during the Carolingian Renaissance.

In addition, a cross section of the middle axis of the church taken in 1965 provided interesting discoveries. At a depth of approximately two meters under the Church floor, a variety of medieval and more modern burials were found.

== Burials ==
- Adolf, Duke of Jülich-Berg (c. 1370 – 14 July 1437)

== See also ==
- Tilmo, founder of St. Martin's, fl. 690.
- Minnborinus of Cologne, refounder of St. Martin's, died 986.
- Arnold of St. Martin's, last Irish abbot, died 1103.
- Twelve Romanesque churches of Cologne
- Cologne Cathedral
- German architecture
- Romanesque architecture
- List of regional characteristics of Romanesque churches
- Romanesque secular and domestic architecture
