= Arnold of St. Martin's =

Irish abbot (died 1103)

Arnold of St. Martin's, Irish abbot, died 1103.

Hogan states that Arnold was the last Irish abbot of Great St. Martin Church, quoting a chronicle of Cologne, which states:

Ultimus ille fuit praesul de gente Scotorum.

== See also ==
- Tilmo, founder of St. Martin's, fl. 690.
- Minnborinus of Cologne, refounder of St. Martin's, died 986.
- Helias of Cologne, abbot of St. Martin's and St. Panthelon's, died 1040.
- Schottenklöster
