= David Scotus =

Irish historian (??–1139)

David Scotus or David the Scot was a Gaelic chronicler who died in 1139. He was a Welsh or Irish cleric who was Bishop of Bangor from 1120 to 1138.

== Biography ==
His date of birth is unknown. Early in the twelfth century there was at Würzburg an ecclesiastic and teacher known as David. His surname Scotus shows that he was probably a Gael from either Ireland or Scotland, assuming that he is identical with the homonymous Bishop of Bangor, from Wales. There is some doubt as to David's nationality, as he is variously described as Welsh or Irish. Many Irish men living outside Ireland at this time had the designation Scottus, which originally denoted an Irishman, not a Scottish person.

He was master of the cathedral school of Würzburg before 1110 - resting place of Irish missionary St. Kilian and St. Kilian's Abbey, Würzburg

According to Ekkehard of Aura's Chronicon, Emperor Henry V received him, was charmed with his virtue and knowledge, and made him one of the imperial chaplains. With other scholars, David accompanied Henry on his expedition to Italy in 1110, and was appointed royal historiographer for the occasion with the intention, perhaps, of drafting the emperor's relatio, a brief narrative stringing together the documents of the intended treaty and presenting his master's achievements in the best light. The expedition did not go to plan, with the incumbent Pope Pascal II at first refusing to crown Henry and his wife, Matilda, relenting only after two months of imprisonment. The work written by David has been lost, although it was used as authority in the writings of William of Malmesbury and Ordericus Vitalis.

He was elected Bishop of Bangor, at the instigation of Gruffudd ap Cynan, king of Gwynedd, in 1120. The previous bishop, Hervé, had been expelled from his see by the Welsh, and deadlock between Gruffudd and the king of England concerning the choice of a new bishop had resulted in the see being vacant for around twenty years. Gruffudd threatened to get the new Bishop consecrated in Ireland, but eventually King Henry I of England agreed to the appointment of David to the see on condition that he accepted the supremacy of Canterbury. David was consecrated by Ralph, Archbishop of Canterbury on 4 April 1120 at Westminster. As bishop, he took part in several English synods, and probably died in 1139, since his successor was then consecrated.

David was responsible for the rebuilding of Bangor Cathedral, the earliest surviving parts of which date to his episcopate. In this he was aided by a large grant of money from Gruffudd ap Cynan. David is last recorded in attendance at the deathbed of Gruffudd ap Cynan in 1137. It is thought that he may have returned to Würzburg as a monk shortly before his death. But it is not easy to reconcile with the foregoing, the statement of the later historian Trithemius, that David became a monk under St. Macharius in St. James's Abbey in Würzburg, as this abbey was not founded until 1140.

== Writings ==
His work in three books is now known only from excerpts of it in later historians, especially in Ekkehard and William of Malmesbury. The latter says that David described the expedition with partiality for the king.

== See also ==
- Aaron Scotus (died 1052)
- Blessed Marianus Scotus (died circa 1088)
- Joseph Scottus (died near 800), Irish deacon, scholar, diplomat, poet, and ecclesiastic
- Johannes Scotus Eriugena (circa 815–877), Irish theologian
- Marianus Scotus (circa 1028–1082), Irish monk
- Marianus Scotus (died c. 1088), Irish abbot of St Peter's at Ratisbon (Regensburg)
- Sedulius Scottus (9th century), Irish teacher, grammarian and Scriptural commentator
