= Kilian of Cologne =

Kilian of Cologne, Irish Abbot, died 19 January 1003

Kilian was a native of Ireland. In 974, he and a group of Irish missionaries, led by Minnborinus of Cologne (died 986), arrived at Cologne where they established St. Martin's Abbey on an island on the Rhine. Minnborinus ruled as first abbot; upon his death, Kilian succeeded him.

J.F. Hogan says of him "Kilian, was appointed to succeed him. He is described as a very religious man; and, we are told, that the Archbishop, Evergerus, with the consent of the Emperor Otho III., presented to him, for the use of his monastery and pilgrim monks, several farms, with the fishing of the Rhine attached; three churches, several manses, vineyards, and exemption from some of the taxes in the city and in the empire. He also got charge of the monastery of St. Pantaleon, in the city, as well as of St. Martin's. It is evident there must have been Irish monks in the former as well as in the latter of these monasteries."

He died 19 January 1003, after which date the abbey appears to have declined in its Irish connection.

== See also ==
- Tilmo
- Marianus Scotus
- Schottenklöster
