= William Lyons (disambiguation) =

William Lyons was a car manufacturer.

William Lyons may also refer to:

- William Lyons (philosopher)
- William L. Lyons (1857–1911), U.S. politician
- William Henry Holmes Lyons (1843–1924), political leader in Northern Ireland
- William J. Lyons Jr. (1921–2014), U.S. politician
- William D. Lyons (1920-1971), American coal miner and politician
- William John Lyons (born 1966), English Christian theologian
- William "Billy" Lyons, murdered by Lee Shelton
- Bill Lyons (born 1958), American baseball player
- Bill Lyons (screenwriter) (born 1945), actor turned writer for Emmerdale
- Will Lyons (born 1976), British business correspondent and wine columnist
- Billy Red Lyons (1932–2009), Canadian professional wrestler

== See also ==
- William Lyon (disambiguation)
- Lyons (surname)
