= Sedulius =

Sedulius may refer to:

- Coelius Sedulius, Christian poet of the 5th century
- Sedulius Scottus, grammarian of the 9th century
