= William Lyon =

William Lyon may refer to:

- William Lyon (film editor) (1903–1974), American film editor
- William John Lyon (1898–1941), New Zealand politician
- William Lyon (bishop) (died 1617), English bishop
- William Lyon (priest) (1883–1961), Anglican Archdeacon of Loughborough
- William Durie Lyon (died 1893), Ontario businessman and politician
- William C. Lyon (born 1841), American politician
- William P. Lyon (1822–1913), Wisconsin jurist and soldier
- William Radenhurst Richmond Lyon (1820–1854), first reeve of Richmond, Ontario
- Bill Lyon (1886–?), Australian rules footballer
- Billy Lyon (born 1973), American football player
- William Lyon (general) (1923–2020), USAF general

== See also ==
- William the Lion, King of the Scots
- William Lyons (disambiguation)
- Lyon (disambiguation)
