= Minnborinus of Cologne =

Irish abbot and saint active in Germany

Minnborinus of Cologne (fl. 974–986) was an Irish abbot and saint active in Germany.

Minborinus was the leader of a group of missionaries from Ireland who travelled to Cologne, Germany. Upon arriving, the Archbishop of Cologne, Warin of Cologne, made Minnborinus abbot of St. Martin's Abbey (now Great St. Martin Church) in the city, and installed the rest of the group in the abbey. Minnborinus governed St. Martin's from 974 till his death on 15 August 986. He was succeeded by his fellow-countryman, Kilian of Cologne.

Because St. Martin's was declared an Irish abbey, there were many dedications to Irish saints in the area, with five churches and seven chapels dedicated to Saint Brigid alone.

His feast-day is celebrated on 18 July.

== See also ==
- Tilmo
- Marianus Scotus
- Schottenklöster

== Sources ==
- "Irish Monasteries in Germany", J.F. Hogan, pp. 526–535, Irish Ecclesiastical Record, 4th series, Vol. 3, (1898).
