= Helias of Cologne =

Helias of Cologne (died 1040) was an Irish abbot and musician.

== Background ==
Helias was a native of what is now County Monaghan, apparently been a monk at the monastery of Muckno which is now the parish around the town of Castleblayney. Trithemius states that he led "a most austere life, and was on that account an object of hatred to wicked men, who feared his reproof."

== Cologne ==
Helias was elected abbot of Great St. Martin Church, Cologne, in 1015. In the same year, he became ruler of St. Pantaleon's; both monasteries would remain under his rule till his death in 1040.

He was a "bosom friend and counsellor" of St. Heribert, Archbishop of Cologne.Heribert died in 1021. Heribert's biographer Landberth wrote about his death: "when this illustrious prelate felt his end approach, he sent for his beloved Helias, who prepared him for death, and administered to him the Sacrament of Extreme Unction, and all the final consolations of the Church."

Helias was succeeded by Mariolus or Molanus, who died in 1061.

=== Archbishop Pilgrim ===
The archbishop of Cologne Pilgrim, Heribert's successor, has an inveterate dislike for the Irish monks and for Helios in particular. Departing on a pastoral visit, he vowed to expel them all upon his return. Helias is said to have prayed to God that if it was his will, they would depart but if not, Pilgrim would never return to Cologne. Pilgrim died at Neomagnus in 1036. However, the story is believed to be more legend than fact. Helias is said to have established a good relationship with Pilgrim's successor Herman II.

=== Rule as abbot ===
According to Hogan, Helias ran both "St. Martin and St. Pantaleon's, with the greatest success. He was remarkable, however, for uncommon strictness in the enforcement of discipline. A French monk of St. Pantaleon having written, without permission, a neat copy of the Missal for the use of the community, Helias burned it, lest others should presume to act without previous licence. He died in the odour of sanctity, and was buried in the chapel of St. Benedict, with the epitaph: Haec tumuli fossa conduntur Praesulis ossa/Heliae miri mirificique viri.

== Musician ==
Helias was a skilled musician, and is held to be the first to introduce Roman chant to Cologne. Jean Mabillon was of the opinion that he was the Stranger and Pilgrim to whom Berno of Reichenau dedicated The Laws of Symphony and Tone. Reichenau itself was founded in 724 by the Irishman Pirminius.
