= Warin of Cologne =

Archbishop of Cologne

Warin (died 9 September 984) was the Archbishop of Cologne, Germany, from 976 to 984.

== Life ==
Nothing is known of Warin's life prior to becoming archbishop except that he was a cleric of the Cathedral in Cologne.

Warin had a mixed record as archbishop. He returned a relic believed to be a part of St. Peter's staff to Archbishop Egbert of Trier in 980. He had two parish churches built, St. Paul and St. Brigida.

Warin became the Archbishop of Cologne in 976. In 983 the Holy Roman Emperor Otto II entrusted Warin with the education of his three-year old son and heir Otto. This custodianship was a role of the Archbishop of Cologne. Otto was crowned King of Germany in Aachen on Christmas Day of that year by Archbishop Willigis of Mainz and Archbishop John of Ravenna, though custom dictated that Warin should have been in charge of the coronation as bishop of Cologne. Though Otto died prior to his son's coronation, the news of his death did not arrive until after. Warin gave custody of Otto III to Henry the Quarrelsome, although modern sources disagree as to whether he did this willingly. Henry claimed custody based on the fact that he was the new king's cousin (first cousin once removed) and his oldest male relative. Henry was trying to gain power himself. Modern scholars once again differ on whether Warin was supportive of Henry's attempt and to what extent.

Warin died in 984 and was buried in the Abbey of St. Martin.

== See also ==
- Minnborinus of Cologne

Preceded by Gero	Archbishop of Cologne; 976–984	Succeeded by Ebergar
