= Ebergar =

Ebergar (also Everger) (died June 11, 999) was the Archbishop of Cologne Germany, from 984 to 999.

== Biography ==
Ebergar's origins are not known. Before becoming Archbishop, Ebergar was a member of the Cathedral Chapter.

Ebergar became the Archbishop of Cologne in 984. In 988 the Lord of Rodenkirchen gave to Cologne the Abbacy of St. Martin, and Ebergar relocated the monastery to the Abbey. In 991 he organised the funeral of the Empress Theophanu.

He died on 11 June 999 and was buried in the Cathedral of Cologne.

Preceded by Warin	Archbishop of Cologne; 984-999	Succeeded by Heribert
