= Marianus Scotus of Regensburg =

Irish abbot and scribe

Marianus Scotus of Regensburg, born Muiredach mac Robartaig, was an Irish abbot and scribe.

== Origins ==
Baptised Muiredach mac Robartaig, he became known as Marianus Scotus, a Latinizition of his first name with the appellation Scotus indicating his Irish background. He was born sometime before the middle of the eleventh century, and died at Ratisbon around 1088.

== Pilgrimage ==
In 1067 he left Ireland, intending to make a pilgrimage to Rome. Like many of his countrymen, however, who visited the Continent, he decided to settle in Germany, at Bamberg, where he became a Benedictine monk. He went with some companions to Ratisbon (or Regensburg), where he founded Kloster Sankt Peter Regensburg|the monastery of St. Peter (Kloster Sankt Peter Regensburg) and became its first abbot.

== Beatification ==
After his death he was beatified and his feast-day is observed on 17 April, 4 July, or, according to the Bollandists, on 9 February.

== His work as a scribe ==
Marianus devoted himself to transcribing and glossing the text of the Scriptures. His success as a scribe, and the exceptional beauty of his calligraphy may be judged by a specimen of his work which has come down to us. This is Codex 1247 of the Imperial Library of Vienna containing the Epistles of St. Paul with glosses, some of which are in Latin and others in Irish. The latter were collected and published by Zeuss in his "Grammatica Celtica" (p. xxiv). The manuscript ends with the words "In honore individuae trinitatis Marianus Scotus scripsit hunc librum suis fratribus peregrinis…" (the date given is 16 May 1078).

Over the words "Marianus Scotus" is the gloss: "Muirdach trog macc robartaig", i.e. "Marianus miser filius Robartaci", or 'Marianus, unworthy son of Robart".

== See also ==
- Aaron Scotus (died 1052)
- David Scotus (died 1139), chronicler
- Joseph Scottus (died near 800), Irish deacon, scholar, diplomat, poet, and ecclesiastic
- Johannes Scotus Eriugena (circa 815–877), Irish theologian
- Marianus Scotus of Mainz (circa 1028–1082), Irish monk
- Sedulius Scottus (9th century), Irish teacher, grammarian and Scriptural commentator
