= Sedulius Scottus =

Irish teacher, Latin grammarian and scriptural commentator

Sedulius Scotus or Scottus (fl. 840–860) was an Irish monk, teacher, Latin grammarian, and scriptural commentator who lived in the 9th century. During the reign of the Emperor Lothair (840–855), he was one of a colony of Irish teachers at Liège. Sedulius is sometimes called Sedulius the Younger, to distinguish him from Coelius Sedulius (a 5th-century poet). The usual Irish form of the name is Siadhal, but he appears to have been called Suadbar. It is quite probable that towards the end of his days he went to Milan, following the example of his countryman Dungal, who established a school at Pavia. When and where he died is unknown.

== Life ==
In search of warmer land to accommodate their growing population, the Norse Vikings made their way into Ireland during the mid-ninth century. Those already occupying the land, Irish monks, were driven out of their monasteries by force. A monk by the name of Sedulius Scottus was among them, and his search for refuge led him to the city of Liège. He went on to document this journey in one of his poems, Flamina Nos Boreae. While in Liège, Sedulius Scottus is believed to have stayed with Bishop Hartgar, who would later be addressed in much of Sedulius' poetry. He would become so fond of Bishop Hartgar that after the man's death, Sedulius wrote a lament in his honour. Sedulius also wrote to other prominent figures of his time, including Empress Ermengarde, King Louis, and Charles the Bald. It appears from the manuscript records of the 9th century that there was a teacher at St. Lambert, Liège, who was known as Sedulius Scotus, and was a scribe and a poet.

In Liège, there was a plague during Sedulius' stay, which he would document in his poem Contra Plagam. Between this event, and the return of the Norse Vikings to Liège, several scholars such as George Whicher, author of The Goliard Poets, have assumed that Sedulius perished in Liège. However, it is also generally accepted that Sedulius moved from Liège to Milan later in his life, but no official date has been assigned to this move. This thought is attributed to the relationship developed between Sedulius and Archbishop Tado of Milan, for whom he wrote the poem Tado, Benigne Vide, or Easter's Greetings.

Aside from Christian literature and Biblical commentary, Sedulius held a passion for alcoholic beverages, especially beer. Sedulius liked the drink so much that he even wrote a lament to a small drought titled Nunc Viridant Segetes, or Drought in Spring. The poem ends with the line "Muse, ask our good father bishop: when do we drink again?"

== Works ==
Sedulius's most important works are his treatise De Rectoribus Christianis, a commentary on Porphyry's Isagoge, or introduction to the logic of Aristotle, and a scriptural commentary Collectanea in omnes beati Pauli Epistolas. The first of these is a noteworthy contribution to Christian ethics. It is the first, apparently, of a long line of treatises written during the Middle Ages for the instruction of Christian princes and rulers, a dissertation on the duties peculiar to that state of life, a mirror for princes, as such works came to be called at a much later period. In his Collectanea he included a copy of the Irish Proverbia Grecorum, a collection of secular wisdom sayings. The Kues manuscript of this work is the only complete copy of the Proverbia.

While in Liège, Sedulius Scottus expanded his influence. He would later be known as the top literary figure in the city between 848 and 858, although the dates vary in regards to when his fame eventually settled. Sedulius Scottus was very interested in the spiritual formation of the royal leaders, asserting that they should possess knowledge to lead both clergy and council. To accomplish this, he wrote De rectoribus Christianis, or On Christian Rulers, for Emperor Lothar I's son, Lothar II. This was designed to be an aid in his princely duties, and fit into a popular category of literature, the "mirror for Princes". In this document, Sedulius highlighted eight pillars that he hoped all Christian rulers would abide by, and used both Theodosius I and Constantine as role models for aspiring Christian leaders. He also mentioned King David among the inspirational figures, commenting that even with sin, David still led the nation towards God.

Sedulius's work shows, among other traits, a deep moral feeling, a realisation of the fact that the mission of the state is neither purely economic on the one hand nor exclusively ecclesiastical, on the other. The question of the relations between Church and State had, indeed, been raised, and Sedulius affirms the rights of the Church, to defend them. He is not on the side of those who, seeing in Charlemagne the ideal of a pontiff and ruler in one person, were in favour of the idea that the prince should, in fact, be supreme in matters religious. On the contrary, he is in favour of a division of temporal and spiritual powers and requires of the prince a careful observance of the Church's rights and privileges. The description of the qualifications of the Queen is not only Christian in feeling and tone, but also humanistic, in the best sense of the word.

Among his work, a mock epic is preserved known as De Quodam Verbece a Cane Discerpto or in English, "On a Ram Torn to Pieces by a Dog". This was intended to be a paradoxical account of Aeneid, a contender to the Gospel accounts of Jesus Christ. His hope was to create a Christian hero in a time when most epics were written about figures that did not subscribe to the Christian doctrine. Sedulius is thought to have held his own copy of the Aeneid, potentially sharing notes in the margins of the document that he made with the addition of comments made by Donatus on Virgil.

The commentary on the Isagoge was known in Western Europe in the Latin version only.

Not the least interesting of the writings of Sedulius are his letters, some of which are published in the "Neues Archiv", II, 188, and IV, 315. In them are narrated the vicissitudes of the Irish exiles on the Continent, and an insight is given into the attitude towards those exiles by the authorities, civil and ecclesiastical, as well as by the people.

Sedulius was at least trilingual, speaking Irish, Greek and Latin. This skill allowed him to translate a number of documents, most famously Greek Psalters. It is suggested by several sources that Sedulius may even have had an entire Bible translated for or by himself. He was a student of Greek, and, according to Bernard de Montfaucon, it was he who copied the Greek Psalter (now no. 8047 in the "Bibliothèque de l'Arsenal", Paris). His poems, to the number of ninety, are published by Traube in the Poetae Aevi Carolini, which is a portion of the Monumenta Germaniae Historica. His eightieth poem begins with two Latin palindromes, both dactylic pentameters, and brags about winning a palindrome-writing contest against a younger monk.

Editions of and commentaries on Sedulius Scottus include that of Ludwig Traube (1896), R. Duchting, and the 1991 edition of his carmina (poems) by Jean Meyers.

=== List of Works ===
- Flamina Nos Boreae (Sharp Boreas Blows)
- De rectoribus Christianis (On Christian Rulers)
- De Quodam Verbece a Cane Discerpto (On a Ram Torn to Pieces by a Dog)
- Contra Plagam (Intercession Against the Plague)
- Collectaneum in Mattheum (Commentary on the Gospel of Matthew) Ed. Bengt Löfstedt, Vetus Latina... aus der Geschichte der lateinischen Bibel, 14, 19. Freiburg: Herder, 1989, 1991.
- De certamine liliae et rosae (Debate between a Lily and a Rose.)
- Nunc Viridant Segetes (Drought in Spring)
- Nos Sitis Atque Fames (Small Beer)
- Aut Lego Vel Scribo (A Scholar's Life)
- Collectaneum in omnes beati Pauli epistolas
- The Standing Corn is Green
- Pangur Bán (possibly)

== "The Scholars of Clonard" ==
The poem, "The Scholars of Clonard", is attributed to Sedulius:

Look on the marble columns surpassing the stars,
which the sand of the saint-bearing land supports here
happy, famous Ailerán, Vinnau, Fergus,
shining lights made by gift-carrying God.
O He sent a great present of Scotia [i.e.Ireland],
rich relics which Pictonia [i.e. Poitiers] wishes to be its own,
whence comes Titan and where night established the stars
and where midday is hot with blazing hours
[i.e. the east and the west and the south].

(The Celtic Latin Tradition of Biblical Style, p. 129, edited and translated by David Howlett, Dublin, 1995)

== See also ==
- Aaron Scotus (died 1052)
- Blessed Marianus Scotus (died c. 1088)
- David Scotus (died 1139), chronicler
- Joseph Scottus (died near 800), Irish deacon, scholar, diplomat, poet, and ecclesiastic
- Johannes Scotus Eriugena (c. 815–877), Irish theologian
- Marianus Scotus (c. 1028–1082), Irish monk
- Pangur Bán – Old Irish poem, possibly written by Sedulius Scottus
- John Duns Scotus (c. 1265-1308)
