= Heribert of Cologne =

German prelate

Saint Heribert
- Archbishop of Cologne
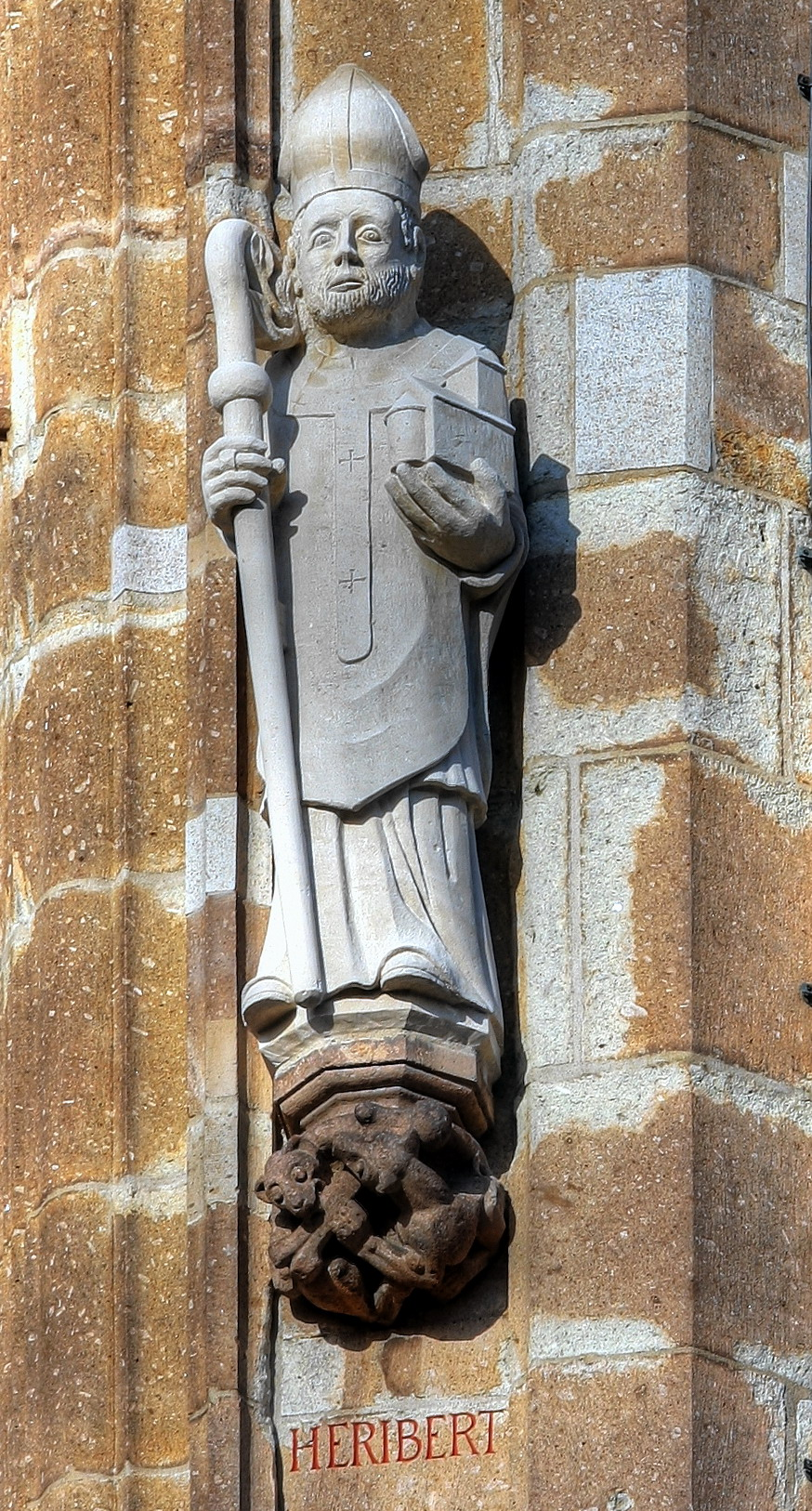
- Statue at the Cologne town hall tower
- Church: Christian – the undivided church, (Catholic Church, pre-Great Schism)
- Archdiocese: Cologne
- See: Cologne
- Appointed: 9 July 999
- Term ended: 16 March 1021
- Predecessor: Ebergar
- Successor: Pilgrim

Orders
- Ordination: 994 by Holdebold
- Consecration: 25 December 999

Personal details
- Born: Heribert c. 970 Worms, Kingdom of Germany
- Died: 16 March 1021 (aged 50-51) Cologne, Kingdom of Germany

Sainthood
- Feast day: 16 March; 30 August (Cologne)
- Venerated in: Catholic Church; Eastern Orthodox Churches
- Canonized: c. 1075 by Pope Gregory VII
- Attributes: Episcopal attire
- Patronage: Rain; Deutz, Cologne

Heribert of Cologne (c. 970 – 16 March 1021), also known as Saint Heribert, was a German prelate of the Catholic Church who served as the Archbishop of Cologne from 999 until his death. He was chancellor of Italy for Otto III, Holy Roman Emperor from 994 and for the Kingdom of Germany from 998. He became an advisor and ally to Henry II, Holy Roman Emperor; their relationship began poorly, but strengthened over time.

Heribert was revered in his lifetime; his canonisation was confirmed around 1075.

== Early life ==
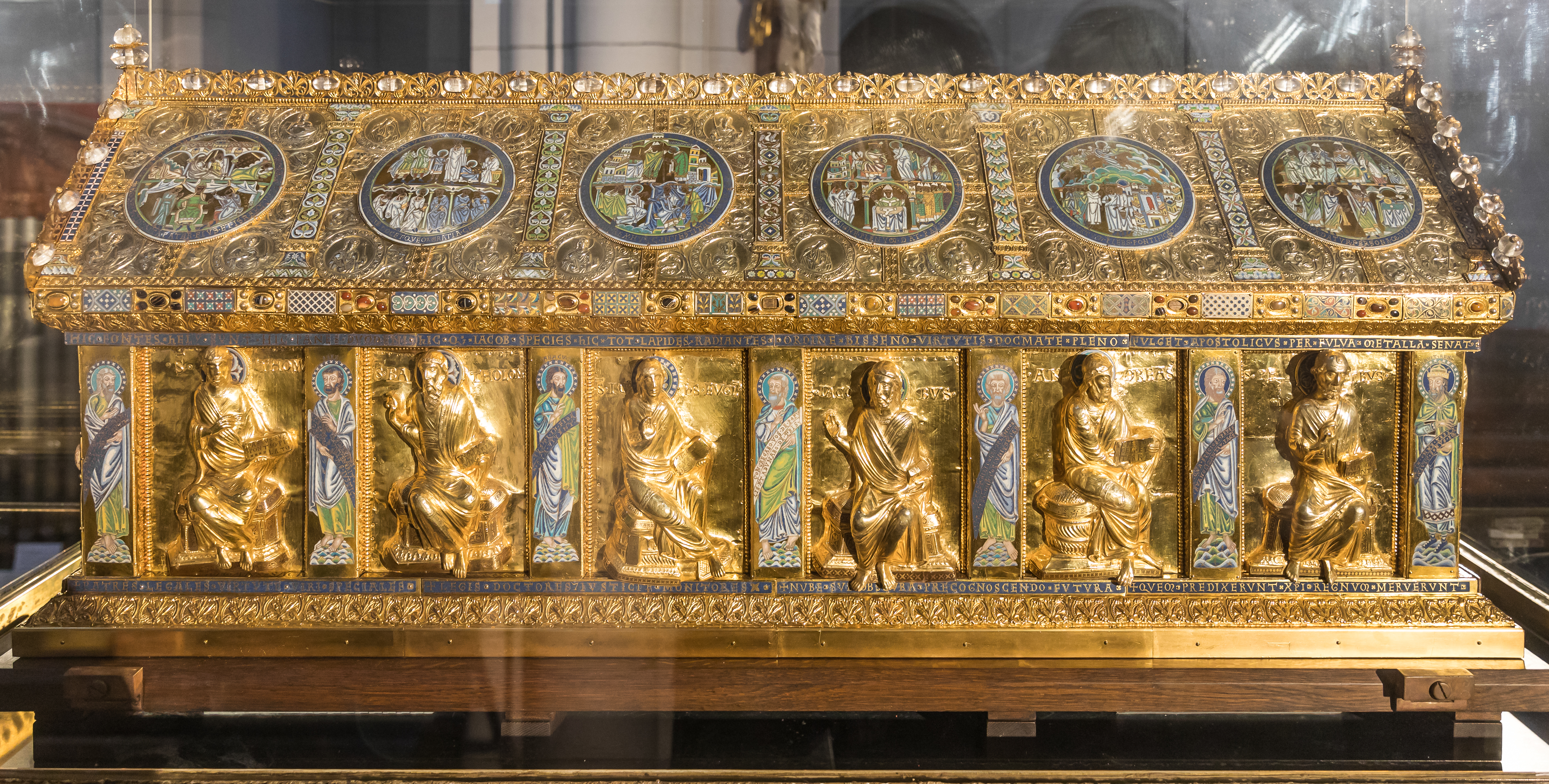
The Heribert shrine in Neu St. Heribert church

Heribert was born around 970 in Worms to Graf ('Count') Hugo and Tietwista. On the maternal side his half-brother was Heinrich who was the Bishop of Würzburg.

Heribert was educated in the Worms Cathedral school and at Gorze Abbey, a Benedictine convent on the river Moselle in Lorraine. He studied alongside Bruno of Carinthia who was the future Pope Gregory V. Heribert wanted to become a Benedictine monk but his father disapproved, so Heribert no longer pursued it.

== Religious career ==
Heribert returned to Worms Cathedral to serve as its provost and received his ordination to the priesthood in 994 from Bishop Holdebold. The Bishop of Worms wanted Heribert to be his successor though the emperor took notice of him and planned to bring him as an advisor to his court.

The Emperor Otto III appointed him in 994 as the Italian chancellor and in 998 for the German kingdom. He held the latter position until Otto III's death. He had accompanied the emperor to Rome in 996 and again in 997 and was still on the peninsula when word came that he had been chosen as the Archbishop of Cologne. In Benevento he received investiture and the pallium from the new Pope Sylvester II on 9 July 999 and on the following Christmas received his episcopal consecration at Cologne in the archdiocesan cathedral.

In 1002 he was present at the deathbed of Otto III at Paterno Castle. While accompanying the Emperor's remains and the imperial regalia on their return to Otto's homeland near Aachen, Heribert was captured at the behest of Henry II, along with the regalia he carried. He first opposed the accession of Henry II, but later served him: Once Henry had gained the crown of Germany in 1002, he acknowledged him as king and served as his advisor, continuing in the office of chancellor. The new emperor came to respect Heribert's abilities and the rift between the two turned into friendship.

In 1003 Heribert founded the Deutz Abbey on the Rhine. He often sent alms to the poor and to priests to distribute to the poor.

== Death and legacy ==
Heribert contracted a fever while on a pastoral visitation and hurried back to his archdiocese of Cologne to recover; he died there within the week on 16 March 1021, and was buried at his abbey in Deutz. His remains were enshrined in a golden reliquary at Deutz Abbey on 30 August 1147. This was moved to the Neu St. Heribert parish church in Köln-Deutz (part of modern Cologne) in the 19th century, where it is still preserved.

Heribert was revered during his lifetime and honoured locally as a saint from the time of his death; he was canonised in about 1075. His reported miracles included ending a drought; he is thus invoked for beneficial rains.

Catholic Church titles
Preceded by Ebergar	Archbishop of Cologne; 9 July 999 – 16 March 1021	Succeeded by Pilgrim
