= William Lyons (philosopher) =

Philosopher

William Edward Lyons is a philosopher who specializes in philosophy of mind. Lyons was the head of the Department of Philosophy (1985–1995) and Professor of Moral Philosophy (1985–2004) in the School of Mental and Moral Science, Trinity College, Dublin. He is now an Emeritus Fellow of Trinity College Dublin and a member of the Royal Irish Academy. He is also the author of a number of "theatre of thought" dramas. His play about Wittgenstein, The Crooked Roads of Genius had its world premiere on 19 April 2011 at the Riverside Studios. He received his PhD at the University of Dundee.

== Theatre of Thought ==
Alongside his work in philosophy, Professor Lyons also has an interest in creating 'Theatre of Thought' drama. His play about Wittgenstein, 'Wittgenstein - The Crooked Roads of Genius' won the open-entry and blind-reviewed START Chapbooks play competition in Ireland in 2009. The Premiere and subsequent performances of 'Wittgenstein - The Crooked Roads of Genius', directed by Nicholas Blackburn, took place at the Riverside Studios, London, 18 April - 8 May 2011. The play-text was published by Methuen Drama-Bloomsbury, London, in 2015. A short film of one scene from the play, "The Examination", was an official selection at the Swedish International Film Festival in July 2016. There is also an avant-garde full film script entitled "The Crooked Roads" which is "under consideration" by a European production company.

His play about Heidegger and Arendt, 'The Fir Tree and the Ivy', won the open-entry and blind-reviewed Eamon Keane Full Length Play award in Ireland in 2006. L'Edera e l'Abete, the Italian translation of William Lyons' play 'The Fir Tree and the Ivy', won the open-entry and blind-reviewed Premio Colline di Torino (Testo Teatrale) in Italy in 2015. The translation is by Dr Alessio Frenda a graduate in Linguistics at TCD. Aided by a grant from The Raymond Williams Foundation in England in 2015, there is now a German translation of 'The Fir Tree and the Ivy', entitled Die Tanne und das Efeu, made by Dr Manfred Welteke, a graduate in philosophy at TCD.

After being selected for work-shopping at the Directors' Lab at the Lincoln Center Theatre in New York in August 2012, his play 'Socrates and his Clouds' was produced by the Greek-Cypriot Meddlers Theatre Company and directed by Melina Theocharidou. The Premiere and subsequent performances of took place at the Jermyn Street Theatre in central London, from 4 - 22 June 2013. The play text was published by Oberon Books - Modern Plays, London, in 2013. Lyons, William (6 March 2013). Socrates and his Clouds. Bloomsbury Publishing. ISBN 9781783190065.There was a production by DRAMSOC on the campus of University College Dublin in November 2015, and a "staged reading" by The Classics Club of Washington University and St Louis University in Missouri in November 2017.

A short version of his play 'All The Hours', entitled 'A Beginning and an end', about religious faith and especially "a religious vocation", was shortlisted for the open-entry and blind-reviewed Kenneth Branagh Award for New Drama Drama Writing in London in 2017. The full-length version of the play will be premiered at La Mama Theatre in Melbourne, 21 September to 2 October 2022, directed by Adam Cass. The play text will be published by Australian Scholarly Publishing in Melbourne in August-September 2022.

== Works ==
List of works by Lyons

=== Books and Plays ===
- Gilbert Ryle (Harvester-Humanities, 1980)
- Emotion (Cambridge University Press, 1980)
- The Disappearance of Introspection (MIT, Bradford Books1986) ISBN 978-0262620628
- Approaches to Intentionality (Oxford University Press, Clarendon, 1995) ISBN 978-0198235262
- (As editor) Modern Philosophy of Mind (Everyman, 1995) ISBN 978-0460875585
- Matters of the Mind (Edinburgh University Press, 2001) ISBN 978-0748614400
- Socrates and His Clouds (Previously known as Nimbus Clouds) (Oberon Books - Modern Plays, 2013) ISBN 978-1783190065
- Wittgenstein - The Crooked Roads (Methuen Drama - Bloomsbury Publishing, 2015) ISBN 978-1474218412
- The Fir Tree and the Ivy (play)

=== Essays ===
- Gilbert Ryle (updated entry, Routledge Encyclopedia of Philosophy Online) (April, 2017)
- Philosophy of Mind In Our Time (Modern Believing, Vol.57, Issue 2, 2016)
- Gilbert Ryle and Logical Behaviourism (Philosophy of Mind: The Key Thinkers, 2013)
- Showing, Not Saying - Filming a Philosophical Genius (Wittgenstein at the Movies, 2011)
- The Great Apostasy? William James (1904, Denial of the Existence of Consciousness', Journal of Consciousness Studies, vol. 17, nos. 9-10, 2010, pp. 117–140)
- Emotion (Philosophie der gefüle, 2009) (reprinted from Emotion, Cambridge University Press, 1980).
- Emotion Theories and Concepts (Philosophical Perspectives) (Oxford Companion to Emotion and the Affective Sciences, Oxford University Press, 2009, 144-145)
- Conscience: An essay in moral psychology (Philosophy Vol. 84, no. 4, 2009, 477-494.)
- Nothing but the Brain (Introduction to Philosophy: Knowledge, God, Mind and Morality, 2009) (reprinted from Matters of the Mind, Edinburgh University Press, 2001)
- (With D. Berman) The First Modern Battle for Consciousness: J.B. Watson's Rejection of Mental Images (Journal of Consciousness Studies, Vol. 14, no. 11, 2007, pp. 2–26)
