= Tilmo =

Irish missionary

Tilmo, Irish missionary, fl. 690.

== Background ==
Tilmo was a native of Ireland, though from what region is unknown. He had once been a soldier, then became a monk, and finally a preacher.

== Cologne ==
Egbert of England and Wigbert tried and failed to convert the pagan Frisians. Egbert however urged others to succeed where he had failed, with the result that Willibrord and Suidbert led twelve monks on a mission to the Frisians. Tilmo was one of the monks and was assigned responsibility for the people of Cologne.

Tilmo built a chapel on an island on the Rhine and began to preach the Gospel to the inhabitants. Within a few years he was joined by other Irishmen such as Wiro, Plechelmus and Otger. The chapel became the monastery of St. Martin of Cologne. Eventually, Wicterp, a native of the area, became abbot of St. Martin's, and later became Bishop of Ratisbon. Wicterp was related to Plectrue, wife of Pepin of Heristal, which helped St. Martin's secure favour among the nobles.

== See also ==
- Great St. Martin Church
- Minnborinus of Cologne
- Marianus Scotus
- Schottenklöster
