= Marianus Scotus =

Irish monk & chronicler (1028–1082/83)

Marianus Scotus (1028–1082 or 1083) was an Irish monk and chronicler. He authored the Chronica Clara, a history of the world.

== Name ==
Marianus Scotus is Latin for "Marian the Scot", although that term at the time was still inclusive of the Irish. He is sometimes known as Marianus Scotus of Mainz to distinguish him from Marianus Scotus of Regensburg and sometimes called Máel Brigte (Modern Irish: Maelbhríde), "Brigit's Servant". The name "Marianus" ('devotee of Mary') was doubtless given on the occasion of his becoming a monk on the Continent.

== Life ==
An Irishman by birth, he was educated by a certain Tigernach and, having become a monk in 1052, he travelled to Germany, on the continental mainland, in 1056, and his subsequent life was passed in the abbeys of St Martin at Cologne and of Fulda, and at Mainz. He died in Mainz on 22 December 1082 or 1083, and was buried in Mainz Cathedral.

== Works ==
Marianus wrote a Clear Chronicle (Latin: Cronica Clara), which purports to be a universal history from the creation of the world to 1082 and which employed a dual numbering scheme on the misunderstanding that the Christian era computed by Dionysius Exiguus had been mistaken by 22 years. The chronicle was very popular during the Middle Ages and, in England, was extensively used by John of Worcester and other writers. It was first printed at Basel in 1559 and has been edited with an introduction by Georg Waitz for the Monumenta Germaniae Historica: Scriptores, Vol. V. Codex Palatino-Vaticanus 830 contains the Tripartite Chronicle of Marianus Scotus.

== See also ==
- Tilmo, Irish missionary, fl. 690.
- Aaron Scotus (died 1052)
- Marianus Scotus of Regensburg (died circa 1088)
- David Scotus (died 1139), chronicler
- Joseph Scottus (died near 800), Irish deacon, scholar, diplomat, poet, and ecclesiastic
- Johannes Scotus Eriugena (c. 815–877), Irish theologian
- Sedulius Scottus (9th century), Irish teacher, grammarian and Scriptural commentator
