= Aaron Scotus =

Irish abbot and musician (??–1052)

Aaron Scotus (fl. late 10th century – 14 December 1052) was an Irish abbot and musician.

== Background ==
Aaron was an Irish abbot and music theorist, the term Scotus at the time denoting Irish (person).

== St. Martin's of Cologne ==
A Benedictine, Scotus was the abbot of St. Martin, Cologne, Germany in the year 1042. He pilgrimaged in his youth to Colonia to the Gaelic-Irish convent of St. Martin. He became abbot of the same in 1042. He was identified with Aaron, abbot of St. Pantaleon. Today historians reject this identification.

== Work as a composer ==
It is believed that he first introduced the Gregorian evening service (nocturns) into Germany. He authored two historically important treaties: De utilitate cantus vocalis et de modo cantandi atque psallendi and De regulis tonorum et symphoniarum. The library of St. Martin, Cologne conserves his work Tractatum de utilitate cantus vocalis et de modo cantandi atque psallendi. He wrote three musical treatises, all of which have been lost.

Aaron died on 14 December 1052.

== Bibliography ==
- Allgemeine Deutsche Biographie – online version
- Slonimsky, Nicolas (ed.): Baker's Biographical Dictionary of Musicians, 7th edition, New York: 1984). ISBN 0-02-870270-0.
- Huglo, Michel: "Aaron Scotus", Grove Music Online , ed. L. Macy, (subscription required; retrieved on 4 September 2007).

== See also ==
- Marianus Scotus
- Blessed Marianus Scotus
- Johannes Scotus Eriugena
- Tilmo
