= Joseph Scottus =

Irish scholar, diplomat, poet, and ecclesiastic

Joseph or Josephus Scottus (died between 791 and 804), called the Deacon, was an Irish scholar, diplomat, poet, and ecclesiastic, a figure in the Carolingian Renaissance. He has been cited as an early example of "the scholar in public life".

== Life ==
His early life is obscure, but he studied first under Colcu, probably at Clonmacnoise, and then under Alcuin at York, probably in the 770s. At York he met and befriended Liudger, a Frisian and future Bishop of Münster, whom he mentions in a poem requesting a "polished staff". Joseph eventually wound up at the court of the Frankish king Charlemagne, probably after accompanying Alcuin to the continent in the 780s.

Joseph was at the Frankish court during a period (790s) of rising anti-Irish sentiment (often expressed in verse), but he seems nonetheless to have established a bond of trust with both Alcuin and Charlemagne. In 787 or 788 Charlemagne sent Joseph and several others on a diplomatic mission to Rome to deal with the Papacy and to Spoleto and Benevento, the capitals of two Lombard duchies opposed to Frankish overlordship. While in southern Italy Joseph and his companions were separated by agents of the Lombard dukes and almost killed.

In 790 Joseph took over Alcuin's position at court while the Northumbrian master was on unexpectedly extended business in his homeland. Thereafter his career is obscure. He eventually rose to become an abbot, but when and where are unknown. It has been suggested, on the basis of his experience in south Italian politics, that he was briefly abbot of Montecassino, but the evidence for this is slim.

== Writings ==
Joseph participated in a revival of acrostic poetry fostered by Alcuin at Charlemagne's court. Four such poems of his are preserved in a collection of religious acrostics, including some by Alcuin and others by Theodulf of Orléans, in a manuscript (MS 212) now in the Burgerbibliothek in Bern. Addressed to Charlemagne, the acrostic carmina figurata—on the similarity of Eve and the Virgin Mary, princely virtues, the Cross, and the names of Christ—imitate the late antique panegyrics Publilius Optatianus Porfyrius addressed to Constantine the Great. The poems, though never popular as literature, still demonstrate "technical virtuosity".

The only other work which certainly belongs to Joseph is an abridgement of a commentary on Isaiah by Jerome (Abbreuiatio or Epitome commentarii (Sancti) Hieronymi in Isaiam), which was apparently ordered by Alcuin. Two other works have been attributed to him, including a lost suite of riddles mentioned in a Passau manuscript before 903. These are more probably the work of Joseph, Bishop of Freising. He may also have written a voces animantium ("voices of animals") listing the sounds of animals in alphabetical order with glosses, now in the Biblioteca Nacional de España (MS 19, folio 189v). This genre was common, but the alphabetisation is unusual. If it is indeed to be ascribed to Joseph, it was probably lifted from his personal notebook.

== Sources ==
- Garrison, Mary (2004). "Joseph Scottus (d. 791x804)." Oxford Dictionary of National Biography, vol. 30. Oxford: Oxford University Press. ISBN 0-19-861380-6.
- Kelly, Joseph (1980). "The Originality of Josephus Scottus' Commentary on Isaiah". Manuscripta. 24 (3): 176–180. doi:10.1484/J.MSS.3.982.
- Silvers, Margaret. (2016) Josephus Scottus's Abbreviation of Jerome's Commentariorum in Esaiam: A Partial Edition with Apparatus. University of York: Doctoral dissertation.
