= Line of hereditary succession =

In inheritance, a hereditary successor is a person who inherits an indivisible title or office after the death of the previous title holder. The hereditary line of succession may be limited to heirs of the body, or may pass also to collateral lines, in case of extinction of heirs of the body, depending on the succession rules. These concepts are in use in English inheritance law.

Main concepts for hereditary succession are usually either heir male or heir general – see further primogeniture (agnatic, cognatic, and also equal). "Heir male" is a genealogical term which specifically means "senior male by masculine primogeniture in the legitimate descent of an individual"

Certain types of property pass to a descendant or relative of the original holder, recipient or grantee according to a fixed order of kinship. Upon the death of the grantee, a designated inheritance such as a peerage, or a monarchy, passes automatically to that living, legitimate, non-adoptive relative of the grantee who is most senior in descent, regardless of the relative age; and thereafter continues to pass to subsequent successors of the grantee, according to the same formula, upon the death of each subsequent heir. Each person who inherits according to this formula is considered an heir at law of the grantee and the inheritance may not pass to someone who is not a natural, lawful descendant or relative of the grantee.

Collateral kin, who share some or all of the grantee's ancestry, but do not directly descend from the grantee, may inherit if there is no limitation to heirs of the body.

There are other kinds of formulae for inheritance, if the heritage can be divided: heirs portioners and partible inheritance.

There are also other types of order of succession than hereditary succession, such as a line of non-hereditary succession to a democratic state office.

== Hereditary succession by monarchy ==
- Succession to the Belgian throne
- Succession to the British throne
- Succession to the Danish throne
- Succession to the Dutch throne
- Succession to the Luxembourger throne
- Succession to the Norwegian throne
- Succession to the Moroccan throne
- Succession to the Spanish throne
- Succession to the Swedish throne

== See also ==
- Designation of successor by reigning ruler
- Elective monarchy
- Imperial election in the Holy Roman Empire
