= Moses of Worms =

Rabbi

Moses of Worms was a legendary rabbi of the eleventh century, reputed to have been the greatest magician and necromancer of his time.

There is a legend that Archbishop Eberhard of Treves issued on April 15, 1066, an edict that those Jews who refused to be baptized on the Saturday preceding Easter must leave the country. The same legend says that Eberhard prepared himself on that Saturday for a general baptism of the Jews, but that the latter by magic brought about his sudden death just before the time appointed for baptism. Tritheim declares that the Jews of Treves had applied to Rabbi Moses of Worms, who, having made a wax figure of the archbishop, kindled it while reciting certain incantations.
