= King =

Title given to a male monarch

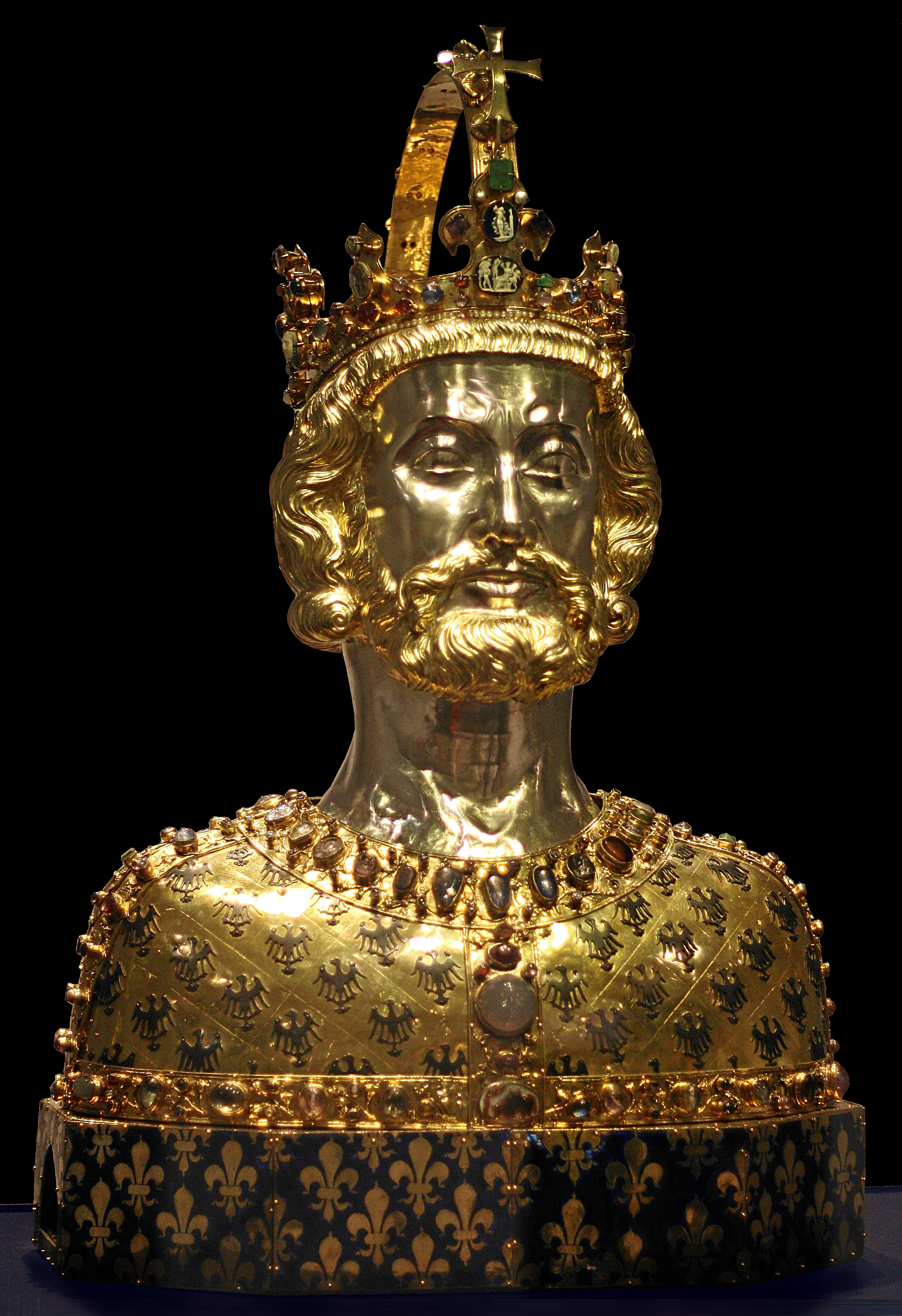
Charlemagne or Charles the Great (748–814) was King of the Franks, King of the Lombards, and the first Holy Roman Emperor. Due to his military accomplishments and conquests, he has been called the "Father of Europe". In Slavic countries and Hungary, the term king was derived from his name, e. g. Czech král [kraːl], Hungarian király [kiraːʎ]

King is a royal title given to a male monarch. A king is an absolute monarch if he holds unrestricted governmental power or exercises full sovereignty over a nation. In a modern context, the title may refer to the ruler of one of a number of modern monarchies (either absolute or constitutional). The title of king is used alongside other titles for monarchs: in the West, emperor, grand prince, prince, archduke, duke or grand duke, and in the Islamic world, malik, sultan, emir or hakim, among others.

== Etymology ==
The word king traces back to late Old English cyning, meaning "ruler" or "leader," derived from Proto-Germanic kuningaz. This root also gave rise to similar terms across other Germanic languages, such as Dutch koning, Old Norse konungr, Danish konge, and German König. The precise origin of "kuningaz" remains uncertain, but it may be linked to Old English cynn ("family, race"), suggesting that a king was originally viewed as the "leader of the kin" or "head of the people." Another theory proposes that the term referred to one "of noble descent," connecting kingship with divine or aristocratic lineage. Linguists and historians have long debated the social and ideological meanings behind this relationship between king and kin, though the linguistic connection is widely accepted. In medieval Europe, the title only was used in the Roman Catholic domain. Knyazi of Eastern Orthodox countries internationally were called princes or dukes, the most powerful of them (velikii knyaz (великий князь)) in western languages grand-dukes (though the literal slavic equivalent of duke is voivode).

== Current kings ==
Currently (as of 2023), eighteen kings are recognized as the heads of state of sovereign states. Most of these kings serve as heads of state in constitutional monarchies. However, those ruling over absolute monarchies include the King of Saudi Arabia and the King of Eswatini.

| Sovereign state | Portrait | King | Title | House | Since | Monarchy |
|---|---|---|---|---|---|---|
| Antigua and Barbuda | | Charles III | King | Windsor (official); Glücksburg (agnatic) | 8 September 2022 | Hereditary, constitutional |
| Australia | | Charles III | King | Windsor (official); Glücksburg (agnatic) | 8 September 2022 | Hereditary, constitutional |
| The Bahamas | | Charles III | King | Windsor (official); Glücksburg (agnatic) | 8 September 2022 | Hereditary, constitutional |
| Belize | | Charles III | King | Windsor (official); Glücksburg (agnatic) | 8 September 2022 | Hereditary, constitutional |
| Canada | | Charles III | King, Roi | Windsor (official); Glücksburg (agnatic) | 8 September 2022 | Hereditary, constitutional |
| Grenada | | Charles III | King | Windsor (official); Glücksburg (agnatic) | 8 September 2022 | Hereditary, constitutional |
| Jamaica | | Charles III | King | Windsor (official); Glücksburg (agnatic) | 8 September 2022 | Hereditary, constitutional |
| New Zealand | | Charles III | King, Kīngi | Windsor (official); Glücksburg (agnatic) | 8 September 2022 | Hereditary, constitutional |
| Papua New Guinea | | Charles III | King | Windsor (official); Glücksburg (agnatic) | 8 September 2022 | Hereditary, constitutional |
| Saint Kitts and Nevis | | Charles III | King | Windsor (official); Glücksburg (agnatic) | 8 September 2022 | Hereditary, constitutional |
| Saint Lucia | | Charles III | King | Windsor (official); Glücksburg (agnatic) | 8 September 2022 | Hereditary, constitutional |
| Saint Vincent and the Grenadines | | Charles III | King | Windsor (official); Glücksburg (agnatic) | 8 September 2022 | Hereditary, constitutional |
| Solomon Islands | | Charles III | King | Windsor (official); Glücksburg (agnatic) | 8 September 2022 | Hereditary, constitutional |
| Tuvalu | | Charles III | King | Windsor (official); Glücksburg (agnatic) | 8 September 2022 | Hereditary, constitutional |
| United Kingdom | | Charles III | King | Windsor (official); Glücksburg (agnatic) | 8 September 2022 | Hereditary, constitutional |
| Bahrain | | Hamad bin Isa Al Khalifa | ملك (malik) | Khalifa | 14 February 2002 | Hereditary, semi-constitutional |
| Belgium | | Philippe | Koning, Roi, König | Saxe-Coburg and Gotha | 21 July 2013 | Hereditary, constitutional |
| Bhutan | | Jigme Khesar Namgyel Wangchuck | འབྲུག་རྒྱལ་པོ་ (druk gyalpo) | Wangchuck | 9 December 2006 | Hereditary, constitutional |
| Cambodia | | Norodom Sihamoni | ស្ដេច (sdac) | Norodom | 14 October 2004 | Elective, constitutional |
| Denmark | | Frederik X | Konge | Glücksburg (official); Monpezat (agnatic) | 14 January 2024 | Hereditary, constitutional |
| Eswatini | | Mswati III | Ngwenyama | Dlamini | 25 April 1986 | Hereditary, absolute |
| Jordan | | Abdullah II | ملك (malik) | Hashim | 7 February 1999 | Hereditary, semi-constitutional |
| Lesotho | | Letsie III | Morena, King | Moshesh | 7 February 1996 | Hereditary, constitutional |
| Malaysia | | Ibrahim Iskandar | Yang di-Pertuan Agong (يڠ دڤرتوان اݢوڠ) | Temenggong | 31 January 2024 | Elective, constitutional |
| Morocco | | Mohammed VI | ملك (malik), ⴰⴳⵍⵍⵉⴷ (agllid) | Alawi | 23 July 1999 | Hereditary, semi-constitutional |
| Netherlands | | Willem-Alexander | Koning | Orange-Nassau (official); Amsberg (agnatic) | 30 April 2013 | Hereditary, constitutional |
| Norway | | Haakon VIII | Konge | Glücksburg | 28 August 2026 | Hereditary, constitutional |
| Saudi Arabia | | Salman | ملك (malik) | Saud | 23 January 2015 | Hereditary, absolute |
| Spain | | Felipe VI | Rey | Bourbon | 19 June 2014 | Hereditary, constitutional |
| Sweden | | Carl XVI Gustaf | Konung | Bernadotte | 15 September 1973 | Hereditary, constitutional |
| Thailand | | Vajiralongkorn (Rama X) | กษัตริย์ (kasat) | Chakri | 13 October 2016 | Hereditary, constitutional |
| Tonga | | Tupou VI | Tuʻi, King | Tupou | 18 March 2012 | Hereditary, constitutional |

== See also ==
- Anointing
- Big man (anthropology)
- Buddhist kingship
- Client king
- Coronation
- Designation
- Divine right of kings
- Germanic kingship
- Great King
- High King
- King consort
- King of Kings
- Petty king
- Queen
- Royal and noble ranks
- Royal family
- Sacred king
- Tribal kingship
- Khan
- Archon
- Basileus
- Lugal
- Kabaka
- Mepe (title)
- Malik/Melekh
- Mwami
- Negus
- Oba
- Raja
- Yang di-Pertuan Agong
- Rex (king)
- Rí
- Tlatoani
- Shah
- Tagavor
