= Tillmann Lohse =

German historian

Tillmann Lohse is a German author, editor, academic, and scholar of Medieval History. In 2003 he was honoured with the "Goslarer Geschichtspreis" for his research on the Salian emperor Henry III. In 2009 he obtained his doctoral degree from Humboldt-University of Berlin. His dissertation dealt with the collegiate church SS. Simon and Jude in Goslar whose manuscripts and files have been stored in various German and Austrian archives since its secularization at the beginning of the 19th century. From these sources Lohse edited a 12th-century urbarium, a 13th-century chronicle and a 15th-century ordinal, all of which were once composed by members of the chapter. Besides pious endowments Lohse's research focusses mainly on the history of migrations, especially the ones of missionaries, and mercenaries, as well as on digital diplomatics. During the spring term of 2017 Lohse was guest professor at Goethe University Frankfurt, since fall 2017 he teaches as an associate professor at Humboldt. In 2021 he was awarded a prize for promoting democracy by Stendal district administrator Patrick Puhlmann.
