= Eberhard (archbishop of Trier) =

- Archbishop of Trier
- Church: Catholic Church
- Diocese: Electorate of Trier
- In office: 1047–1066

Personal details
- Born: c. 1010
- Died: 5 April 1066

Eberhard (c. 1010 – 15 April 1066) was the Archbishop of Trier from 1047 until his death.

Eberhard was a son of Ezelin. He was educated at the Cathedral of Worms. He was appointed archbishop by the Emperor Henry III in consultation with the people of the archdiocese.

In 1048, he travelled to Rome with the Bishop of Toul to attend his confirmation as Pope Leo IX and to himself be consecrated Archchancellor of Gaul. In 1049, he traveled to Rheims and Mainz to help promote ecclesiastical reform in the Lotharingian church.

In 1056, he joined Anno II, Archbishop of Cologne, Godfrey III, Duke of Lower Lorraine, and Henry I, Count Palatine of Lotharingia, in supporting the empress Agnes of Poitou during her regency. Also in 1056 he finished the construction of the north tower of Trier Cathedral. Nine years later, in 1065, Eberhard consecrated Henry IV as King of Germany.

Around 1060, Eberhard became embroiled in a war with Conrad I of Luxembourg that led to the intervention of Pope Nicholas II.

Eberhard died in Trier in 1066 and was buried in the College of St. Paul.
