= Designation (monarchy) =

Method of influencing the line of succession

In monarchies where the order of succession is not coded, the ruling or previous monarch specifies the relative he/she command or recommend to succeed him/her after his/her death or while he/she is alive.

== Origin of the term ==
The word "designation" is derived from the Latin and means the nomination, in advance, of someone to an office.

== Middle Ages ==
Designation played a significant constitutional and political role in the succession of the Frankish monarchy and, later, in the succession of kings in the Holy Roman Empire in Middle Ages. Because the throne was not passed on by inheritance, the king tried to determine his successor by making a recommendation to the "greats of the empire" (i.e. the empire's most powerful princes) within his own lifetime. Not infrequently this took the form of an actual nomination, but was probably also indicated by less formal acts.

Four forms of designation can be distinguished, which have legally different meanings:

- the designatio de futuro, the obligation demanded by the reigning king on the "great princes" to recognise the succession of his son by swearing an oath of allegiance to the son (examples are the designation of Liudolf in 946 by Otto I, Henry III in 1026 and Henry IV in 1050.
- the designatio de praesenti of the pre-Hohenstaufen era, the election of the king's son commanded by the king during his lifetime (for example, the designation of Otto III)
- the designatio de praesenti of the Hohenstaufen era (e. g. the designation of Henry VI in 1169)
- the Fremddesignation, i. e. the designation of a successor who is not the son of the ruler (e. g. the designation of Henry I in 919 and Frederick I in 1152)

The attempt by rulers to override the electoral rights of the princes in this way was no longer as successful after 1075, which is why Henry VI pursued an Erbreichsplan or "plan for a hereditary empire. With the double election of 1198, he had practically failed, but the right of the princes to elect the king despite a royal designation was settled only with the formation of the college of electors (Kurfürstenkolleg).

== Literature ==
- G. Theuerkauf: Artikel Designation in: Handwörterbuch zur deutschen Rechtsgeschichte (HRG). 2nd edn., Vol. 1, Berlin, 2008, cols. 955–957.
- Ulrich Schmidt: Königswahl und Thronfolge im 12. Jahrhundert (=Forschungen zur Kaiser und Papstgeschichte des Mittelalters. Beihefte zu J. F. Böhmer, Regesta Imperii 7), Cologne, Vienna, 1987.
- Heinrich Mitteis: Die deutsche Königswahl. Ihre Rechtsgrundlagen bis zur Goldenen Bulle. 2nd revised edition. Brünn etc. 1944.
