= 1020s =

Decade

The 1020s was a decade of the Julian Calendar which began on January 1, 1020, and ended on December 31, 1029.

== Events ==
=== 1020 ===
- Summer – Emperor Henry II conducts his third Italian military campaign. He makes plans to invade the south, but remains non-committal.
- June 15 – Byzantine troops under Catepan Basil Boioannes (supported by his ally Prince Pandulf IV) capture the fortress of Troia.
- The French city of Saint-Germain-en-Laye is founded by King Robert II (the Pious).
- King Canute the Great codifies the laws of England (approximate date).
- King Gagik I of Armenia is succeeded by Hovhannes-Smbat III.

=== 1021 ===
==== By place ====
====== Europe ======
- November – Emperor Henry II conducts his fourth Italian military campaign. He crosses the Brenner Pass with a 60,000-strong army, and reaches Verona, where he receives Lombard levies. Henry proceeds to Mantua and then into Ravenna, to spend Christmas there.
- Abd al-Aziz al-Mansur, a grandson of the prominent Andalusian figure Almanzor begins his rule in Taifa of Valencia, a Moorish kingdom in Al-Andalus (modern Spain), ushering in a period of relative stability and prosperity that will last until 1061. Taifa of Valencia gained its independence from the Caliphate of Córdoba in 1010.

====== Africa ======
- February 13 – On one of his habitual night rides in the outskirts of Cairo, the Fatimid caliph al-Hakim bi-Amr Allah disappears, most likely assassinated by disaffected palace factions, apparently involving his sister, Sitt al-Mulk.
- March 26 – On the feast of Eid al-Adha, the death of al-Hakim, kept secret for six weeks, is announced, along with the succession of his son, al-Zahir li-i'zaz Din Allah. On the same day, al-Hakim's designated heir, Abd al-Rahim ibn Ilyas, is arrested in Damascus and brought to Egypt.
- The last evidence of indigenous Christian and non-Arabophone culture in Tripolitania (modern Libya) is seen.

====== Asia ======
- Senekerim-Hovhannes Artsruni, king of Vaspurakan (Greater Armenia), surrenders his kingdom to the Byzantine Empire. In return, he receives Sebasteia and becomes governor of Cappadocia.
- Battle of Shirimni, the Byzantine Empire under Basil II defeats the Kingdom of Georgia under Giorgi I at Shirimni, at the Lake Palakazio, modern Lake Çıldır, Turkey
- Hovhannes-Smbat III, King of the Armenian kingdom of Ani, is attacked by his younger brother Ashot IV, and loses much power to him, becoming concurrent king of outlying territories.
- Emperor Rajendra Chola I extends his influence of the Chola Empire to the banks of the Ganges River (North India) and invades Bengal.
- Sultan Mahmud of Ghazni appoints Malik Ayaz to the throne, making Lahore (modern Pakistan) the capital of the Ghaznavid Empire.
- The Chinese capital city of Kaifeng has some half a million residents by this year. Including all those present in the nine designated suburbs, the population is over a million people.

====== North America ======
- Vikings known to be occupying L'Anse aux Meadows on Newfoundland (island).

=== 1022 ===
==== By place ====
====== Byzantine Empire ======
- Spring – Battle of Svindax: The Byzantine army under Emperor Basil II defeats the Georgians at Svindax (modern Turkey). King George I is forced to negotiate a peace treaty, ending the Byzantine–Georgian wars.
- Summer – Nikephoros Phokas Barytrachelos conspires with the Byzantine general Nikephoros Xiphias against Basil II. The rebellion collapses and Xiphias assassinates Phokas.

====== Europe ======
- Spring – Emperor Henry II divides his army into three columns and descends through Rome onto Capua after the Lombard states of Southern Italy had switched their allegiance to the Byzantinians in the wake of the battle of Cannae four years earlier. The bulk of the expeditionary force (20,000 men) led by Henry, makes its way down the Adriatic coast.
- Pilgrim, archbishop of Cologne, marches with his army down the Tyrrhenian coast to lay siege to Capua. The citizens open the gates and surrender the city to the imperial army.
- Pilgrim besieges the city of Salerno for forty days. Prince Guaimar III offers to give hostages – Pilgrim accepts the prince's son and co-prince Guaimar IV, and lifts the siege.
- Summer – Outbreak of the plague among the German troops forces Henry II to abandon his campaign in Italy. He reimposes his suzerainty on the Lombard principalities.
- King Olof Skötkonung dies and is succeeded by his son Anund Jakob as ruler of Sweden. He becomes the second Christian king of the Swedish realm.

====== Africa ======
- The 14-year-old Al-Mu'izz ibn Badis, with support of the Zirid nobles, takes over the government and (as a minor) ascends to the throne in Ifriqiya (modern Tunisia).

====== Asia ======
- The Chinese military has one million registered soldiers during the Song Dynasty, an increase since the turn of the 11th century (approximate date).

==== By topic ====
====== Religion ======
- After the Council of Orléans, King Robert II of France burns thirteen heretics at Orléans. These are the first burning victims for heresy.
- Pope Benedict VIII convenes a synod at Pavia. He issues decrees to restrain simony and incontinence of the clergy.
- Æthelnoth, archbishop of Canterbury, travels to Rome to obtain the pallium. He is received by Benedict VIII.

=== 1023 ===
==== January–March ====
- January 16 – (21 Shawwal 413 AH) The Grand Vizier of the Fatimid Caliphate in Egypt is executed only nine months after succeeding Khatir-al-Mulk.
- January 24 – A solar eclipse is visible from London.
- February 5 – At Cairo in the Fatimid Caliphate, the Caliph al-Zahir li-I'zaz Din Allah attains full power upon the death of his aunt, Sitt al-Mulk.
- February 12 – (18 Dhu-I-qa'da 413 AH) In Spain, Al-Ma'mun al-Qāsim ibn Ḥammud returns to Cordoba to become the new Emir, after the Emir Yaḥya ibn ʿAli ibn Ḥammud al-Muʿtali bi-llāh leaves the city and moves to Malaga. Al-Qasim reigns for 10 months before being forced out by Abd al-Rahman V.
- February 23 – The Chitragupta Temple (now in India at Khajuraho at the Madhya Pradesh state) is consecrated to the Hindu god Shiva, at the Maha Shivaratri celebration.
- March 27 – Gebhard von Hohenwart becomes the new Bishop of Regensburg in Bavaria, upon the death of Gebhard of Swabia.
- March – Musharrif al-Dawla, ruler of Iraq, comes to Baghdad to see the Abbasid Caliph al-Qadir, and attempts to defy the caliphate.

==== April–June ====
- April 10 – Al-Hasan ibn Muhammad ibn Thu'ban becomes the new Emir of Halab (in what is now northern Syria) after Safiyy al-Dawla is dismissed by the Caliph al-Hakim.
- May 11 – In the Kingdom of León in Spain, the Abbot Oliba declines to authorize the wedding of King Alfonso V to Urraca Garcés, the sister of King Sancho of Pamplona, describing it as incesti connubii. The wedding takes place anyway.
- May 16 – From his capital at Mainz in Germany, Henry II, Holy Roman Emperor, issues a grant of lands in Tragoess (now in Austria) to the Göss Abbey.
- June 15 – (17th day before the kalends of July) The body of the late Ælfheah of Canterbury, the former Archbishop of Canterbury who will later be canonized as a Roman Catholic saint and a martyr of the church, is reburied at Canterbury Cathedral on orders of England's King Canute, after being moved from St. Paul's Cathedral in London on June 12 (the 3rd day before the ides of June). King Canute, whose Danish troops had murdered Archbishop Ælfheah on April 19, 1012, during Canute's invasion of England, has ordered the reburial as an atonement for Ælfheah's death.

==== July–September ====
- July 20 – A partial solar eclipse, part of the Solar Saros 120 cycle, is visible to the natives of southern South America in what are now Brazil, Uruguay and Chile.
- August 11 – King Robert II of France and Henry II, Holy Roman Emperor have a neutral site meeting at Ivois (now Carignan in France's département of Ardennes), and pledge to convene an assembly at Pavia to reform the clergy.
- September 14 – Rudolph III, King of Burgundy and his wife, Queen Ermengard, grant the county of Viennois to the Archbishop of Vienne.

==== October–December ====
- October 18 – Al-Mu'izz ibn Badis becomes the full ruler of Ifriqiya (modern day Tunisia) upon the death of his aunt, Umm Mallal, who had served as regent since 1016.
- November 13 – The marriage of King Alfonso V of León to Princess Urraca of Pamplona is confirmed by the Roman Catholic Church.
- December 2 – Abd al-Rahman V becomes the Muslim Caliph of Córdoba in what is now most of the southern two-thirds of Spain and Portugal by overthrowing Al-Qasim al-Ma'mun, but only serves for six weeks until his assassination by Muhammad III.
- December – Abbad I declares the Taifa of Seville independent from Córdoban rule. Abd ar-Rahman V is proclaimed Caliph at Córdoba.

==== By place ====
====== Europe ======
- The Judge-Governor of Seville in Al-Andalus (modern Spain) takes advantage of the disintegration of the Caliphate of Córdoba and seizes power as Abbad I, founding the Abbadid dynasty.

====== Asia ======
- April/May (Jian 3, 4th month) – An epidemic in Kyoto (Japan) is so severe that there are corpses in the streets; disease spreads throughout the country.
- 60th birthday and longevity ceremony of Japanese matriarch Minamoto no Rinshi, wife of Fujiwara no Michinaga.
- The Ghaznavid Empire occupies Transoxiana (approximate date).

==== By topic ====
====== Religion ======
- The Dom Church at Utrecht (modern Netherlands) is severely damaged by fire. Bishop Adalbold II begins construction of a new Romanesque style church.

=== 1024 ===
==== January–March ====
- January 17 – Abd al-Rahman V, Caliph of Córdoba is assassinated in a coup d'etat by Muhammad III of Córdoba.
- February 17 – According to the cartulary-chronicle of the Bèze Abbey (officially the Abbaye Saint-Pierre et Saint-Paul de Bèze) in the Burgundy region of France, the brothers Girard and Lambert repent of their seizure of the village of Viévigne and restore the property to the Abbey "for the good of their souls".
- March 9 – In Bamberg in Germany, the Holy Roman Emperor issues an order to regulate the ongoing dispute between the ministries of Fulda and Hersfeld
- March 23 (9 Muharram 415 AH) – In the first example of the reversal of the policy of religious tolerance created by the late Fatimid Caliph al-Hakim, Egyptian Christian Abu Zakariyya is arrested on charges of apostasy. Zakariyya, raised as a Christian, had converted to Islam, but then renounced Islam and converted back to Christianity, with immunity granted by al-Hakim. Zakariyya, apparently singled out for punishment is executed on October 14 (7 Shaban 415 CE).
- March – Massud ibn Tahir al-Wazzan, the vizier of the Fatimid Caliphate of Egypt since 1019, is dismissed by the Caliph al-Zahir li-I'zaz Din Allah, and replaced by al-Rudhbari.

==== April–June ====
- April 9 – Pope Benedict VIII, formerly Theophylact II, Count of Tusculum, dies after a reign of 12 years at Rome.
- April 19 – Romano de Tusculana, Count of Tusculum and the brother of the late Pope Benedict, arrives in Rome to become the 144th pope of the Roman Catholic Church, and takes the name Pope John XIX.

=== 1025 ===
==== By place ====
====== Africa ======
- Emir Al-Mu'izz ibn Badis of the Zirid dynasty in Ifriqiya (modern Tunisia) attempts to retake Sicily but is unsuccessful.

====== Asia ======
- Srivijaya, a Buddhist kingdom based in Sumatra, is attacked by Emperor Rajendra I of the Chola dynasty of southern India in a dispute over trading rights in Southeast Asia. It survives but declines in importance.
- Completion and publishing of Avicenna's Canon of Medicine.
- Japanese Kampaku (Regent) Fujiwara no Yorimichi holds horse racing at his mansion; the emperor attends.

=== 1026 ===
==== Asia ====
- A Zubu revolt against the Liao dynasty is suppressed, with the Zubu forced to pay an annual tribute of horses, camels and furs.
- June 16 – A tsunami with waves of 10 m (33 ft) at present-day Masuda, Shimane; more than 1,000 people were killed and 3,000 homes were destroyed.

====== Europe ======
- Spring – King Conrad II, "the Elder", assembles an army of thousands of armored knights for an expedition into Italy. He besieges Pavia and marches to Milan, where he is crowned with the Iron Crown by Archbishop Aribert as king of the Lombards. Duke William V ("the Great") of Aquitaine, who is already en route for Italy, decides to renounce his claim to the Lombard throne and turns back.
- April – Conrad II punishes the citizens of Pavia with starvation, with the help of Milanese troops, for burning down the Royal Palace. He appoints Aribert as his viceroy ("imperial vicar") in Italy and charges him to ensure that the order is complied with.
- Summer – Conrad II leaves the bulk of his army at the siege of Pavia, and marches to Ravenna. The Ravennan militias close the town gates and assault the imperial train. Conrad rallies his troops and takes Ravenna, taking bloody revenge.
- June 1 – The Basilica of Saint Maternus in Walcourt, present-day Belgium, is consecrated by Bishop Réginhard of Liège.
- Conrad II proceeds to Pesaro, but a malarian outbreak forces him to withdraw back up north to the Po Valley. He subdues the March of Turin, where Count Ulric Manfred II opposes the election of Conrad.
- Autumn – Pavia falls to the imperial forces. Only the intervention of Odilo of Cluny persuades Conrad to have mercy on the city and the defeated rebels.
- Battle of Helgeå (off the coast of Sweden): Naval forces of King Cnut the Great's North Sea Empire defeat the combined Swedish and Norwegian royal fleets.
- 9-year-old Henry "the Black" is made duke of Bavaria by his father, Conrad II, after the death of his predecessor Henry V.
- Pietro Barbolano becomes 28th doge of Venice.
- Guido of Arezzo: Micrologus

=== 1027 ===
==== By Place ====
====== Europe ======
- March 26 – Pope John XIX crowns Conrad II ("the Elder") and his wife Gisela of Swabia as Holy Roman Emperor and Empress, respectively, in Old St. Peter's Basilica in Rome. Cnut the Great, King of Denmark and England, attends the coronation, proving his position as sole ruler of the Danish North Sea Empire.
- May 14 – King Robert II of France ("the Pious") sues for peace with his sons. Henry I is crowned co-king of France at Reims Cathedral, but has little power to rule (until 1031).
- August 6 – Robert the Magnificent becomes duke of Normandy after the death of his brother Richard III.
- Duke Sergius IV of Naples donates the County of Aversa to a band of Norman mercenaries led by Rainulf Drengot, who support him in the war with Capua.
- King Sigtrygg Silkbeard of Dublin and sub-King Flannacán of Brega make a pilgrimage to Rome.
- Ealdred is appointed abbot of Tavistock Abbey in England (approximate date).

====== Asia ======
- August 16 – Bagrat IV becomes king of Georgia on the death of his father, George I. Queen Dowager Mariam becomes regent for her 9-year-old son.
- Wedding of Crown Prince Atsunaga of Japan and Imperial Princess Teishi.
- This is the first year of the first rabjyung (60-year) cycle to start in the Tibetan calendar.

==== By topic ====
====== Science, technology and medicine ======
- The Book of Healing (Arabic: کتاب الشفاء Kitab Al-Shifaʾ, Latin: Sufficientia), a comprehensive scientific and philosophical encyclopedia written by the Persian polymath Avicenna (Abū ʿAlī ibn Sīnā), is published.
- Song dynasty Chinese engineer Yan Su reinvents the 3rd-century south-pointing chariot, a mechanical-driven compass vehicle (as recorded in the Song Shi).

=== 1028 ===
==== By place ====
====== Byzantine Empire ======
- November 11 – Emperor Constantine VIII dies at Constantinople after a 3-year reign. On his deathbed, and without a male heir, Constantine arranges that his eldest daughter, Zoë Porphyrogenita, succeeds him and marries the Byzantine nobleman, Romanos III (Argyros).
- November 15 – Zoë Porphyrogenita takes the throne as empress consort. Her husband, Romanos III (age 60) becomes emperor of the Byzantine Empire.

====== England ======
- Cnut the Great sails from England to Norway with a fleet of 50 ships. He defeats Olaf Haraldsson and is crowned king of Norway. Cnut becomes the sole ruler of England, Denmark and part of Sweden (known as the Danish North Sea Empire).

====== Europe ======
- April 14 – The 10-year-old Henry III (the Black), son of Emperor Conrad II (the Elder), is elected and crowned king of Germany in Aachen Cathedral by Pilgrim, archbishop of Cologne.
- King Sancho Garcés III (the Great) conquers Castile (modern Spain) (approximate date).

=== 1029 ===
==== By place ====
====== Asia ======
- March/April: The Ghaznavid Sultan Maḥmūd sacks brutally the city of Rayy after having received a request for help by its Buyyid ruler Majd al-Dawla for help against his rebellious troops. He crucifies a large number of the local population and burns many books that he considers heretical.

====== Europe ======
- Prince Pandulf IV of Capua becomes the de facto ruler of southern Italy – holding Capua and Naples himself – this in support with his powerful allies Amalfi, Salerno and Benevento. Only the Duchy of Gaeta remains out of his grasp.
- Rainulf Drengot, head of a mercenary band of Norman knights, is approached by Duke John V of Gaeta and is persuaded to change sides. With Norman help, Duke Sergius IV recovers Naples from Capuan occupation.
- Duke Bretislav I (Bohemian Achilles) of Bohemia of the Přemyslid Dynasty reconquers Moravia from Poland (approximate date).

==== By topic ====
====== Religion ======
- The seat of the Bishopric of Zeitz is moved to Naumburg (Saxony-Anhalt) in Central Germany.

== Significant people ==
- Al-Qadir caliph of Baghdad
- Al-Hakim bi-Amr Allah caliph of Cairo
- Henry I of France
- Avicenna

== Births ==
1020

- Almodis de la Marche, French noblewoman (d. 1071)
- Beatrice of Bar, French duchess and regent (d. 1076)
- Benno II, German bishop and architect (approximate date)
- Bernard of Menthon, French priest and saint (d. 1081)
- Conrad I (or Cuno), duke of Bavaria (approximate date)
- Filarete of Calabria, Sicilian saint (approximate date)
- Gonzalo Sánchez, Spanish nobleman (approximate date)
- Gunhilda of Denmark, German queen (approximate date)
- Guo Xi, Chinese landscape painter (approximate date)
- Hallvard Vebjørnsson, Norwegian saint (approximate date)
- Kunigunde of Altdorf, German noblewoman (approximate date)
- Maria of Gaeta, Italian noblewoman (approximate date)
- Osbern Giffard, Norman nobleman (approximate date)
- Otto of Nordheim, duke of Bavaria (approximate date)
- Stephen IX, pope of the Catholic Church (approximate date)
- Su Song, Chinese statesman and scientist (d. 1101)
- Sweyn Godwinson, English nobleman (approximate date)
- Vladimir Yaroslavich, Grand Prince of Kiev (d. 1052)
- William I (the Great), count of Burgundy (d. 1087)
- William Busac, English nobleman (jure uxoris) (d. 1076)
- William FitzOsbern, 1st Earl of Hereford (approximate date)
- William of Poitiers, French priest and writer (d. 1090)
- Wulfhild of Norway, duchess consort of Saxony (d. 1071)
- Zhang Zai, Chinese philosopher and cosmologist (d. 1077)

1021

- December 8 – Wang Anshi, Chinese chancellor (d. 1086)
- Eudokia Makrembolitissa, Byzantine empress (d. 1096)
- Fujiwara no Kanshi, Japanese empress consort (d. 1102)
- Wugunai, Chinese chieftain of the Wanyan tribe (d. 1074)

1022

- Fujiwara no Nobunaga, Japanese nobleman (d. 1094)
- Harold II, king of England (approximate date)
- Manasses III, French nobleman (d. 1065)
- Michael Attaleiates, Byzantine historian (d. 1080)
- Ordulf, duke of Saxony (approximate date)
- Rajaraja Narendra, Indian ruler (d. 1061)

1023

- Lý Thánh Tông, Vietnamese emperor (d. 1072)
- Otto I (or Odon), count of Savoy (approximate date)
- Ramon Berenguer I, count of Barcelona (d. 1076)
- William VII ("the Bold"), duke of Aquitaine (d. 1058)

1024

- May 13 – Hugh the Great, abbot of Cluny (d. 1109)
- Al-Kunduri, vizier of the Seljuk Empire (d. 1064)
- Bruno II, margrave of Friesland (d. 1057)
- Fu Yaoyu, Chinese official and politician (d. 1091)
- Iziaslav I, Grand Prince of Kiev (d. 1078)
- Magnus the Good, king of Norway (d. 1047)

1025

- August 28 – Go-Reizei, Japanese emperor (d. 1068)
- Agnes of Poitou, Holy Roman Empress (d. 1077)
- Anna Dalassene, Byzantine empress and regent
- Edith of Wessex, English queen (approximate date)
- Elisaveta Yaroslavna of Kiev, Norwegian queen
- Gerald of Sauve-Majeure, French abbot (d. 1095)
- Gertrude of Poland, Grand Princess of Kiev (d. 1108)
- John Italus, Byzantine philosopher (d. 1090)
- John of Lodi, Italian hermit and bishop (d. 1106)
- Lothair Udo II, German margrave (d. 1082)
- Nong Zhigao, Vietnamese chieftain of Nong
- Ruben I, Armenian prince (approximate date)
- Rudolf of Rheinfelden, duke of Swabia (d. 1080)
- Simon I, French nobleman (approximate date)
- Tora Torbergsdatter, Norwegian Viking queen
- William VIII, French nobleman (approximate date)

1026

- Lidanus, Lombard Benedictine abbot (d. 1118)
- Tostig Godwinson, earl of Northumbria (approximate date)
- Pope Victor III, born Dauferio, Lombard churchman (approximate date)
- William Firmatus, Norman hermit and pilgrim (d. 1103)

1027

- January 19 – Shōshi, Japanese empress consort (d. 1105)
- Albert III, count of Namur (House of Namur) (approximate date)
- Al-Mu'tamid ibn Abbad, Abbadid ruler of Seville (d. 1095)
- Ernest the Brave, margrave of Austria (d. 1075)
- Fayun Faxiu, Chinese Chan Buddhist monk (d. 1090)
- Matilda of Franconia, German princess (d. 1034)
- Sviatoslav II, Grand Prince of Kiev (d. 1077)
- Ulrich I (or Udalrich), German bishop (d. 1121)

1028

- February 17 – Al-Juwayni, Persian scholar and imam (d. 1085)
- Burchard II (or Bucco), bishop of Halberstadt (approximate date)
- Nuño Álvarez de Carazo, Spanish nobleman and warrior (d. 1054)
- Qutb Shah, Persian Sufi religious leader and scholar (d. 1099)
- Robert of Molesme, founder of the Cistercian Order (d. 1111)
- William I (the Conqueror), king of England (approximate date) (d. 1087)

1029

- January 20 – Alp Arslan (Heroic Lion), sultan of the Seljuk Empire (d. 1072)
- July 5 – Al-Mustansir Billah, caliph of the Fatimid Caliphate (d. 1094)
- Abū Ishāq Ibrāhīm al-Zarqālī, Arab astrologer and astronomer (d. 1087)
- Al-Humaydī, Andalusian scholar and writer of Islamic studies (d. 1095)
- Clement III, antipope of the Catholic Church (approximate date)
- Kaoruko (or Saien-no Kogo), Japanese empress consort (d. 1093)
- Said al-Andalusi, Moorish astronomer and mathematician (d. 1070)
- Ulrich of Zell (or Wulderic), German abbot and saint (d. 1093)

== Deaths ==
1020

- June 12 – Lyfing, archbishop of Canterbury
- June 15 – Dattus (or Datto), Lombard rebel leader
- August 16 – Zhou Huaizheng, Chinese eunuch
- Al-Mu'ayyad Ahmad, Muslim imam (b. 944)
- Al-Sijzi, Persian mathematician (approximate date)
- Bernard I (Taillefer), Spanish nobleman
- Bouchard II (the Bearded), French nobleman (b. 975)
- Einar Sigurdsson, Norse Viking nobleman
- Ferdowsi, Persian poet and author (b. 940)
- Gagik I, king of Bagratid Armenia (approximate date)
- Gerald I (Tranche-Lion), French nobleman
- Gojslav, king of Croatia (approximate date)
- Leif Ericson, Norse Viking explorer (approximate date)
- Melus of Bari, Lombard nobleman and rebel leader
- Radim Gaudentius, Polish archbishop (b. 970)
- Stephen I of Vermandois, French nobleman
- Trdat the Architect, Armenian chief architect

1021

- February 13 – Al-Hakim bi-Amr Allah, Fatimid caliph (b. 985)
- March 5 – Arnulf, French archbishop and illegitimate son of Lothair III
- March 16 – Heribert, archbishop of Cologne (b. c. 970)
- July 7 – Fujiwara no Akimitsu, Japanese bureaucrat (b. 944)
- August 17 – Erkanbald, German abbot and archbishop
- August 29 – Minamoto no Yorimitsu, Japanese nobleman (b. 948)
- Fujiwara no Yoshikane, Japanese nobleman (b. 957)
- Hamid al-Din al-Kirmani, Fatimid scholar and philosopher
- Hamza ibn 'Ali ibn-Ahmad, founding leader of the Druze
- Liu Mei, Chinese official and general (approximate date)
- Mac Cú Ceanain, king of Uí Díarmata (Ireland)
- Shams al-Dawla, Buyid emir of Hamadan (Iran)
- Trilochanapala, king of the Kabul Shani dynasty

1022

- March 12 – Symeon the New Theologian, Byzantine monk (b. 949)
- March 23 – Zhen Zong, emperor of the Song Dynasty (b. 968)
- March 30 – Atenulf, Italian nobleman and Benedictine abbot
- June 28 – Notker III, German Benedictine monk and writer
- July 23 – Lei Yungong, Chinese palace eunuch and adviser
- August 15 – Nikephoros Phokas, Byzantine aristocrat
- September 2 – Máel Sechnaill II, High King of Ireland
- November 20 – Bernward, bishop of Hildesheim
- December 2 – Elvira Menéndez, queen of León
- Al-Shaykh Al-Mufid, Twelver Shia theologian
- Arikesarin, Indian ruler of the Shilahara Dynasty
- Aziz al-Dawla, Fatimid governor of Aleppo
- Konstantin Dobrynich, mayor of Novgorod
- Moninho Viegas, French knight (b. 950)
- Olof Skötkonung, king of Sweden
- Rededya, leader of the Kassogians
- Sidi Mahrez, Tunisian scholar (b. 951)

1023

- March 27 – Gebhard I, bishop of Regensburg
- May 28 – Wulfstan (or Lupus), archbishop of York
- October 18 – Zirid princess and regent
- October 21 – Gero, archbishop of Magdeburg
- October 24 – Kou Zhun, Chinese grand chancellor
- November 24 – Eilward, bishop of Dresden-Meissen
- December 5 – Hartwig, archbishop of Salzburg
- Abū Hayyān al-Tawhīdī, Muslim intellectual (b. 923)
- Godfrey II, count and duke of Lower Lorraine (b. 965)
- Llywelyn ap Seisyll, king of Gwynedd and Powys
- Oda of Haldensleben, duchess of the Polans
- Sitt al-Mulk, Fatimid princess and regent (b. 970)

1024

- April 9 – Benedict VIII, pope of the Catholic Church
- July 13 – Henry II, Holy Roman Emperor (b. 973)
- Abd ar-Rahman V, Umayyad caliph of Córdoba
- Alpert of Metz, French Benedictine chronicler
- Brihtwine, bishop of Wells (approximate date)
- Choe Hang, civil minister of Goryeo (Korea)
- Cúán úa Lothcháin, Irish poet and Chief Ollam
- Hugbert (or Hukbrecht), bishop of Meissen
- Sultan al-Dawla, Buyid emir of Fars (b. 993)

1025

- April 25 – Fujiwara no Seishi, Japanese empress consort (b. 972)
- May – Musharrif al-Dawla, Buyid emir of Iraq (b. 1003)
- June 17 – Bolesław I the Brave, king of Poland (b. 967)
- August 10 – Burchard of Worms, German bishop and writer
- August 11 – Kanshi, Japanese princess consort
- c. August 30 – Fujiwara no Kishi, Japanese crown princess, posthumously named empress, mother of Emperor Go-Reizei (b. 1007)
- September 17 – Hugh Magnus, king of France (b. 1007)
- September 29 – Louis I, count of Chiny and Verdun
- November
  - Koshikibu no Naishi, Japanese waka poet and lady-in-waiting (b. c.999)
  - Matilda, countess palatine of Lotharingia (b. 979)
- December 15 – Basil II, Byzantine emperor (b. 958)
- December 22 – Wang Qinruo, Chinese chancellor
- December – Eustathius of Constantinople, Byzantine patriarch
- Al-Qadi Abd al-Jabbar ibn Ahmad, Muslim theologian (b. 935)
- Mhic Mac Comhaltan Ua Cleirigh, Irish king
- Sabur ibn Ardashir, Persian statesman (b. 942)
- Watanabe no Tsuna, Japanese samurai (b. 953)

1026

- June 10 – Hugh II, French viscount and archbishop
- August 28 – Richard II, "the Good", duke of Normandy
- August 30 – Bononio, Lombard hermit and abbot
- September 21 – Otto-William, count of Burgundy
- November 27 – Adalbold II, bishop of Utrecht
- Adelaide-Blanche of Anjou, French queen and regent
- Frederick II, duke of Upper Lorraine (Lotharingia)
- Henry V, duke of Bavaria (House of Luxembourg)
- Hugh IV, lord of Lusignan (approximate date)
- Leo of Vercelli, German archdeacon and bishop

1027

- January 3 – Fujiwara no Yukinari, Japanese calligrapher (b. 972)
- August 6 – Richard III, duke of Normandy (House of Normandy)
- August 16 – George I, king of Georgia (House of Bagrationi)
- October 16 – Fujiwara no Kenshi, Japanese dowager empress (b. 994)
- Abu'l-Qasim al-Husayn ibn Ali al-Maghribi, Arab statesman (b. 981)
- Aurelia of Regensburg, daughter of Hugh Capet and saint
- Dayang Jingxuan, Chinese Zen Buddhist monk (b. 943)
- Dogra mac Dúnadach, king of Síol Anmchadha (Ireland)
- Gadhra Mór mac Dundach, king of Uí Maine (Ireland)
- Hippolytus, archbishop of Gniezno (approximate date)
- Sulayman al-Ghazzi, Arab poet and bishop of Gaza (approximate date)
- Walter of Speyer, German bishop and poet (b. 967)
- Yazid II, Persian ruler (shah) of Shirvan (Azerbaijan)

1028

- January 3 – Fujiwara no Michinaga, Japanese nobleman (b. 966)
- August 7 – Alfonso V (the Noble), king of León (Spain) (b. 994)
- November 11 – Constantine VIII, Byzantine emperor (b. 960)
- Lin Bu (or Junfu), Chinese poet and calligrapher (b. 967)
- Liu Wenzhi, Chinese official of the Song dynasty (b. 964)
- Lý Công Uẩn, founder of the Vietnamese Lý dynasty (b. 974)
- Qawam al-Dawla, Buyid governor and ruler of Kerman (b. 1000)
- Sayyida Shirin, Bavandid princess and wife of Fakhr al-Dawla
- William of Bellême, French nobleman (House of Bellême)

1029

- January 20 – Heonae, Korean queen consort and regent (b. 964)
- January 27 – Unwan (or Unwin), archbishop of Hamburg-Bremen
- May 28 – Herman of Ename, count of Verdun (Lower Lorraine)
- Abu'l-Qasim Jafar, Buyid statesman and vizier (Fasanjas family)
- Al-Karaji, Persian mathematician and engineer (approximate date)
- Fujiwara no Kinsue, Japanese statesman and courtier (b. 957)
- Fujiwara no Tametoki, Japanese nobleman (approximate date)
- Haakon Ericsson, Norwegian Viking nobleman (approximate date)
- Ibn al-Kattani, Moorish astrologer, poet and physician (b. 951)
- Kushyar Gilani, Persian mathematician and geographer (b. 971)
- Lu Zongdao, Chinese official and politician (approximate date)
- Salih ibn Mirdas, Arab founder of the Mirdasid Dynasty
