= 1029 =

Calendar year

1029 in various calendars
- Gregorian calendar: 1029; MXXIX
- Ab urbe condita: 1782
- Armenian calendar: 478; ԹՎ ՆՀԸ
- Assyrian calendar: 5779
- Balinese saka calendar: 950–951
- Bengali calendar: 435–436
- Berber calendar: 1979
- English Regnal year: N/A
- Buddhist calendar: 1573
- Burmese calendar: 391
- Byzantine calendar: 6537–6538
- Chinese calendar: 戊辰年 (Earth Dragon); 3726 or 3519 — to — 己巳年 (Earth Snake); 3727 or 3520
- Coptic calendar: 745–746
- Discordian calendar: 2195
- Ethiopian calendar: 1021–1022
- Hebrew calendar: 4789–4790
- Hindu calendars
- Vikram Samvat: 1085–1086
- Shaka Samvat: 950–951
- Kali Yuga: 4129–4130
- Holocene calendar: 11029
- Igbo calendar: 29–30
- Iranian calendar: 407–408
- Islamic calendar: 419–420
- Japanese calendar: Chōgen 2 (長元２年)
- Javanese calendar: 931–932
- Julian calendar: 1029; MXXIX
- Korean calendar: 3362
- Minguo calendar: 883 before ROC 民前883年
- Nanakshahi calendar: −439
- Seleucid era: 1340/1341 AG
- Thai solar calendar: 1571–1572
- Tibetan calendar: ས་ཕོ་འབྲུག་ལོ་ (male Earth-Dragon); 1155 or 774 or 2 — to — ས་མོ་སྦྲུལ་ལོ་ (female Earth-Snake); 1156 or 775 or 3

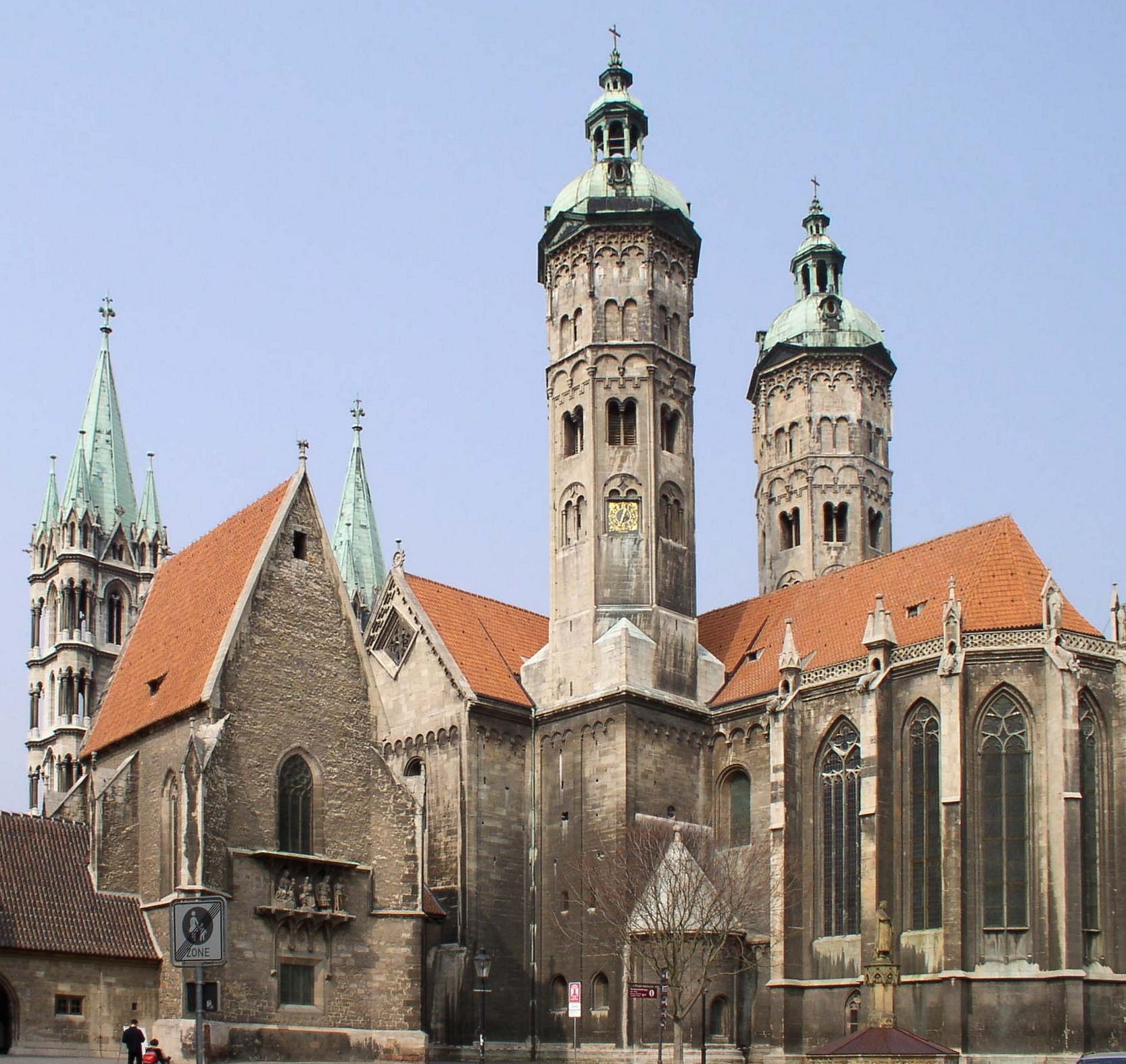
Naumburger Dom (St. Peter and St. Paul)

Year 1029 (MXXIX) was a common year starting on Wednesday of the Julian calendar.

== Events ==
=== By place ===
==== Asia ====
- March/April: The Ghaznavid Sultan Maḥmūd brutally sacks the city of Rayy after receiving a request for help from its Buyyid ruler Majd al-Dawla against his rebellious troops. He crucifies a large number of the local population and burns many books that he considers heretical.

==== Europe ====
- Prince Pandulf IV of Capua becomes the de facto ruler of southern Italy – holding Capua and Naples himself – in support with his powerful allies Amalfi, Salerno and Benevento. Only the Duchy of Gaeta remains out of his grasp.
- Rainulf Drengot, head of a mercenary band of Norman knights, is approached by Duke John V of Gaeta and is persuaded to change sides. With Norman help, Duke Sergius IV recovers Naples from Capuan occupation.
- Duke Bretislav I (Bohemian Achilles) of Bohemia of the Přemyslid dynasty reconquers Moravia from Poland (approximate date).

=== By topic ===
==== Religion ====
- The seat of the Bishopric of Zeitz is moved to Naumburg (Saxony-Anhalt) in Central Germany.

== Births ==
- January 20 – Alp Arslan (Heroic Lion), sultan of the Seljuk Empire (d. 1072)
- July 5 – Al-Mustansir Billah, caliph of the Fatimid Caliphate (d. 1094)
- Abū Ishāq Ibrāhīm al-Zarqālī, Arab astrologer and astronomer (d. 1087)
- Al-Humaydī, Andalusian scholar and writer of Islamic studies (d. 1095)
- Clement III, antipope of the Catholic Church (approximate date)
- Kaoruko (or Saien-no Kogo), Japanese empress consort (d. 1093)
- Said al-Andalusi, Moorish astronomer and mathematician (d. 1070)
- Ulrich of Zell (or Wulderic), German abbot and saint (d. 1093)

== Deaths ==
- January 20 – Heonae, Korean queen consort and regent (b. 964)
- January 27 – Unwan (or Unwin), archbishop of Hamburg-Bremen
- May 28 – Herman of Ename, count of Verdun (Lower Lorraine)
- Abu'l-Qasim Jafar, Buyid statesman and vizier (Fasanjas family)
- Al-Karaji, Persian mathematician and engineer (approximate date)
- Fujiwara no Kinsue, Japanese statesman and courtier (b. 957)
- Fujiwara no Tametoki, Japanese nobleman (approximate date)
- Haakon Ericsson, Norwegian Viking nobleman (approximate date)
- Ibn al-Kattani, Moorish astrologer, poet and physician (b. 951)
- Kushyar Gilani, Persian mathematician and geographer (b. 971)
- Lu Zongdao, Chinese official and politician (approximate date)
- Salih ibn Mirdas, Arab founder of the Mirdasid dynasty
