= Zhou Huaizheng =

Zhou Huaizheng (周懷政)

Personal details
- Born: 970s likely Taiyuan, Northern Han
- Died: August 16, 1020 Kaifeng, Song Empire
- Occupation: Eunuch
- Adoptive father: Zhou Shaozhong (周紹忠)

Zhou Huaizheng
- Traditional Chinese: 周懷政
- Simplified Chinese: 周怀政
Transcriptions
Standard Mandarin
- Hanyu Pinyin: Zhōu Huáizhèng
- Wade–Giles: Chou^{1} Huai^{2}-cheng^{4}

Zhou Huaizheng (died 16 August 1020) was a powerful Song dynasty palace eunuch during Emperor Zhenzong's reign. After Emperor Zhenzong's illness in 1019 made him incapable of ruling, state power gradually fell to the hands of his wife Empress Liu and chancellor Ding Wei. Zhou plotted to assassinate Ding so that Kou Zhun could return to chancellorship, but his coup failed. He was arrested by Lei Yungong and executed.

== Early life ==
During the Conquest of Northern Han by Song in 979, eunuch Zhou Shaozhong followed Emperor Taizong of Song and the Song dynasty army to Northern Han's capital Taiyuan. He found a young boy among the dead bodies and adopted him as a son, naming him Zhou Huaizheng. Thus Zhou Huaizheng was able to grow up in the imperial palace as a young eunuch in the Song capital Kaifeng.

== Notes and references ==
- (in Chinese) Toqto'a; et al., eds. (1345). Song Shi (宋史) [History of Song].
- (in Chinese) Li Tao (1183). Xu Zizhi Tongjian Changbian (續資治通鑑長編) [Extended Continuation to Zizhi Tongjian].
