= 1026 =

Calendar year

1026 in various calendars
- Gregorian calendar: 1026; MXXVI
- Ab urbe condita: 1779
- Armenian calendar: 475; ԹՎ ՆՀԵ
- Assyrian calendar: 5776
- Balinese saka calendar: 947–948
- Bengali calendar: 432–433
- Berber calendar: 1976
- English Regnal year: N/A
- Buddhist calendar: 1570
- Burmese calendar: 388
- Byzantine calendar: 6534–6535
- Chinese calendar: 乙丑年 (Wood Ox); 3723 or 3516 — to — 丙寅年 (Fire Tiger); 3724 or 3517
- Coptic calendar: 742–743
- Discordian calendar: 2192
- Ethiopian calendar: 1018–1019
- Hebrew calendar: 4786–4787
- Hindu calendars
- Vikram Samvat: 1082–1083
- Shaka Samvat: 947–948
- Kali Yuga: 4126–4127
- Holocene calendar: 11026
- Igbo calendar: 26–27
- Iranian calendar: 404–405
- Islamic calendar: 416–417
- Japanese calendar: Manju 3 (万寿３年)
- Javanese calendar: 928–929
- Julian calendar: 1026; MXXVI
- Korean calendar: 3359
- Minguo calendar: 886 before ROC 民前886年
- Nanakshahi calendar: −442
- Seleucid era: 1337/1338 AG
- Thai solar calendar: 1568–1569
- Tibetan calendar: ཤིང་མོ་གླང་ལོ་ (female Wood-Ox); 1152 or 771 or −1 — to — མེ་ཕོ་སྟག་ལོ་ (male Fire-Tiger); 1153 or 772 or 0

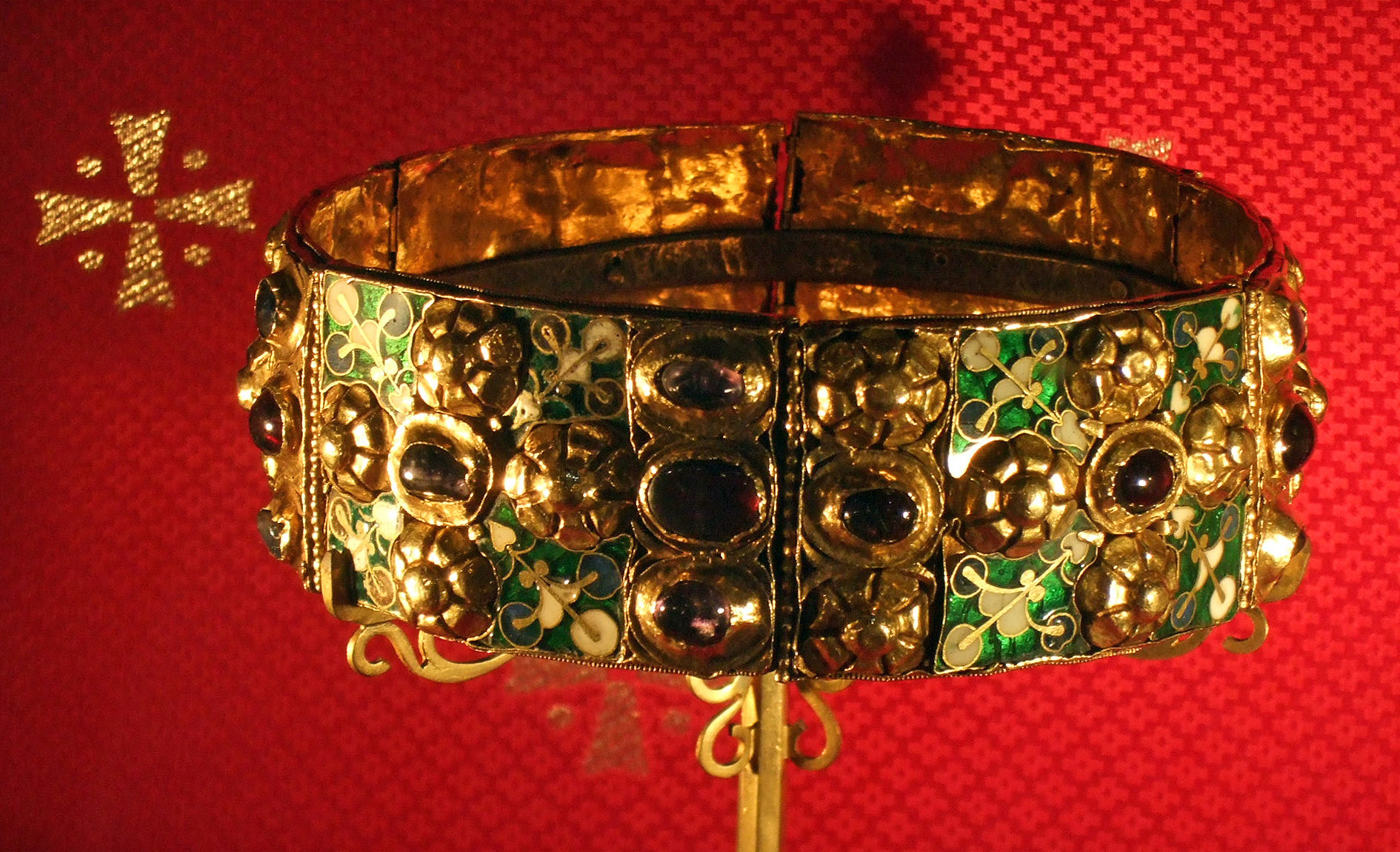
The Iron Crown of Lombardy, displayed in the Cathedral of Monza (near Milan).

Year 1026 (MXXVI) was a common year starting on Saturday of the Julian calendar.

== Events ==
=== Asia ===
- A Zubu revolt against the Liao dynasty is suppressed, with the Zubu forced to pay an annual tribute of horses, camels and furs.
- June 16 – The Manju tsunami with waves of 10 m (33 ft) at modern-day Masuda, Shimane: more than 1,000 people are killed and 3,000 homes destroyed.

=== Europe ===
- Spring – King Conrad II, "the Elder", assembles an army of thousands of armored knights for an expedition into Italy. He besieges Pavia and marches to Milan, where he is crowned with the Iron Crown by Archbishop Aribert as king of the Lombards. Duke William V ("the Great") of Aquitaine, who is already en route for Italy, decides to renounce his claim to the Lombard throne and turns back.
- April – Conrad II punishes the citizens of Pavia with starvation, with the help of Milanese troops, for burning down the Royal Palace. He appoints Aribert as his viceroy ("imperial vicar") in Italy and charges him to ensure that the order is complied with.
- Summer – Conrad II leaves the bulk of his army at the siege of Pavia, and marches to Ravenna. The Ravennan militias close the town gates and assault the imperial train. Conrad rallies his troops and takes Ravenna, taking bloody revenge.
- June 1 – The Basilica of Saint Maternus in Walcourt, modern-day Belgium, is consecrated by Bishop Réginhard of Liège.
- Conrad II proceeds to Pesaro, but a malarian outbreak forces him to withdraw back up north to the Po Valley. He subdues the March of Turin, where Count Ulric Manfred II opposes the election of Conrad.
- Autumn – Pavia falls to the imperial forces. Only the intervention of Odilo of Cluny persuades Conrad to have mercy on the city and the defeated rebels.
- Battle of Helgeå (off the coast of Sweden): Naval forces of King Cnut's North Sea Empire defeat the combined Swedish and Norwegian royal fleets.
- 9-year-old Henry "the Black" is made duke of Bavaria by his father, Conrad II, after the death of his predecessor Henry V.
- Pietro Barbolano becomes 28th doge of Venice.
- Approximate date – Guido of Arezzo writes his treatise on music, Micrologus.

== Births ==
- Lidanus, Lombard Benedictine abbot (d. 1118)
- Tostig Godwinson, earl of Northumbria (approximate date)
- Pope Victor III, born Dauferio, Lombard churchman (approximate date)
- William Firmatus, Norman hermit and pilgrim (d. 1103)

== Deaths ==
- June 10 – Hugh II, French viscount and archbishop
- August 28 – Richard II, "the Good", duke of Normandy
- August 30 – Bononio, Lombard hermit and abbot
- September 21 – Otto-William, count of Burgundy
- November 27 – Adalbold II, bishop of Utrecht
- Adelaide-Blanche of Anjou, French queen and regent
- Frederick II, duke of Upper Lorraine (Lotharingia)
- Henry V, duke of Bavaria (House of Luxembourg)
- Hugh IV, lord of Lusignan (approximate date)
- Leo of Vercelli, German archdeacon and bishop
