= 2nd millennium =

Millennium spanning the years 1001 to 2000

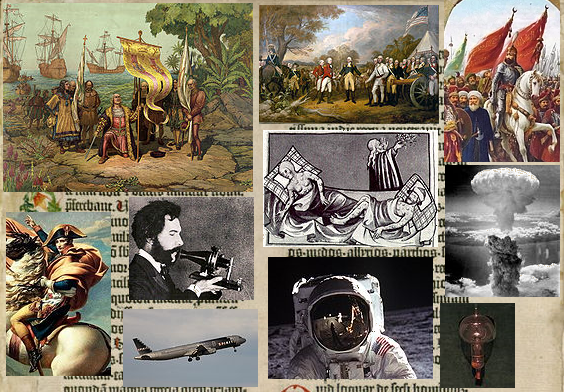
From top left, clockwise: in 1492, Christopher Columbus reaches the New World, opening the European colonization of the Americas; the American Revolution, one of the late 1700s Enlightenment-inspired Atlantic Revolutions; the Ottoman conquest of Constantinople; the Atomic Bomb from World War II; an alternate source of light, the light bulb; for the first time, a human being sets foot on the Moon in 1969 during the Apollo 11 Moon mission; airplanes enable widespread air travel; Napoleon Bonaparte, in the early 19th century, affects France and Europe with expansionism, modernization, and nationalism; Alexander Graham Bell's telephone; in 1348, the Black Death kills in just two years over 100 million people worldwide, and over half of Europe. (Background: An excerpt from the Gutenberg Bible, the first major book printed in the West using movable type, in the 1450s)

The second millennium of the Anno Domini or Common Era began on January 1, 1001 (MI) and ended on December 31, 2000 (MM), (11th to 20th centuries; in astronomy: JD 2086667.5 – 2451909.5).

It encompassed the High and Late Middle Ages of the Old World, the Islamic Golden Age and the period of Renaissance, followed by the early modern period, characterized by the European wars of religion, the Age of Enlightenment, the Age of Discovery and the colonial period. Its final two centuries coincide with modern history, characterized by industrialization, the rise of nation states, the rapid development of science, widespread education, and universal health care and vaccinations in the developed world. The 20th century saw increasing globalization, most notably the two World Wars and the subsequent formation of the United Nations. 20th-century technology includes powered flight, television and semiconductor technology, including integrated circuits. The term "Great Divergence" was coined to refer the unprecedented cultural and political ascent of the Western world in the second half of the millennium, emerging by the 18th century as the most powerful and wealthy world civilization, having eclipsed Qing China, Edo Japan, the Islamic world and India. This allowed the colonization by European countries of much of the world during this millennium, including the Americas, Africa, Oceania, and South and Southeast Asia.

World population grew without precedent over the millennium, from about 310 million in 1001 to about 6 billion in 2000. The population growth rate increased dramatically during this time; world population approximately doubled to 600 million by 1700, and doubled more than three more times by 2000, ultimately reaching about 1.8% per year in the second half of the 20th century.

== Political history ==
=== Middle Ages ===
==== Europe ====
- Western/Central Europe
  - Kingdom of Scotland (843–1707): see Medieval Scotland
  - Kingdom of England (927–1707): see Medieval England
  - Holy Roman Empire (962–1806): see Medieval Germany
  - Kingdom of France (987–1789): see Medieval France
  - Kingdom of Hungary (1000–1526)
  - Kingdom of Portugal (1139–1910)
  - Kingdom of Poland (1025–1385): see Medieval Poland
  - Old Swiss Confederacy (from c. 1300): see Medieval Switzerland
- Medieval Italy
  - Kingdom of Italy
  - Papal States
  - Maritime republics
  - Kingdom of Sicily
- Medieval Spain: see also Reconquista
  - Caliphate of Córdoba (929–1031)
  - Crown of Aragon (1035–1479)
  - Crown of Castile (1030–1479)
  - Emirate of Granada (1230–1492)
- Medieval Scandinavia: see also Viking Age
  - Kingdom of Denmark (c. 936–1397)
  - Kingdom of Sweden (c. 970–1397)
  - Kingdom of Norway (c. 1015–1397)
  - Kalmar Union (1397–1523)
- Eastern/Southeastern Europe
  - Byzantine Empire (330–1453)
  - Kievan Rus (880–1150)
  - Kingdom of Croatia (925–1102), Croatia in union with Hungary (1102–1526)
  - Kingdom of Bosnia (1154–1463)
  - Second Bulgarian Empire (1185–1396)
  - Kingdom of Serbia (1217–1346)
  - Serbian Empire (1346–1371)
  - Grand Duchy of Lithuania (c. 1236–1795)
  - Golden Horde (1240s–1502), see also: Tatar yoke
  - Grand Duchy of Moscow (1283–1547)

==== Near East ====
see also Crusades, Mongol invasions

- Byzantine Empire (330–1453)
- Abbasid Caliphate (750–1517)
- Bagratid Armenia (880s–1045)
- Fatimid Caliphate (910–1171)
- Kingdom of Georgia (1008–1493)
- Seljuk Empire (1037–1194)
- Khwarazmian dynasty (1077–1231)
- Crusader states
  - County of Edessa (1098–1144)
  - Principality of Antioch (1098–1268)
  - Kingdom of Jerusalem (1099–1291)
  - County of Tripoli (1102–1289)
  - Latin Empire (1204–1261)
- Sultanate of Rum (1194–1308)
- Ilkhanate (1256–1353)
- Ottoman Empire (1299–1924)
- Timurid Empire (1370–1507)

==== North Africa ====
- Medieval Egypt
  - Ayyubid Sultanate of Egypt (1174—1250)
  - Mamluk Sultanate of Egypt (1250–1517)
- Almoravid dynasty (1040–1147)
- Almohad dynasty (1121–1269)
- Marinid dynasty (1244–1465)
- Hafsid dynasty (1229–1574)
- Kingdom of Tlemcen (1235–1554)

==== East Asia ====
- Goryeo (918–1392)
- Hoysala Empire (1026–1343)
- Jin dynasty (1115–1234)
- Joseon dynasty (1392–1897)
- Khmer Empire (802–1431)
- Liao dynasty (907–1125)
- Mongol Empire (1206–1368)
- Ming dynasty (1368–1644)
- Pagan Kingdom (849–1287)
- Song dynasty (960–1279)
- Western Xia (1038–1227)
- Yuan (Mongol) dynasty (1271–1368)

==== India ====
- Eastern Chalukyas (7th to 12th centuries)
- Pala Empire (8th to 12th centuries)
- Chola Empire (9th century to 13th centuries)
- Western Chalukya Empire (10th to 12th centuries)
- Kalachuri dynasty (10th to 12th centuries)
- Eastern Ganga dynasty (11th to 15th centuries)
- Hoysala Empire (10th to 14th centuries)
- Kakatiya Kingdom (1083–1323)
- Sena dynasty (11th to 12th centuries)
- Delhi Sultanate (1206–1526)
- Bengal Sultanate (1352–1576)
- Ahom Kingdom (from 1228)
- Reddy Kingdom (1325–1448)
- Seuna (Yadava) dynasty (1190–1315)
- Vijayanagara Empire (1375–1591)

==== Sahel / Sudan and Sub-Saharan Africa ====
- Gao Empire, Sahel (c. 9th to 15th centuries)
- Benin Empire, West Africa (from c. 1180)
- Sultanate of Ifat, Horn of Africa (1285–1415)
- Mali Empire, Sahel (c. 1230–1600)
- Songhai Empire, Sahel (c. 1464–1591)
- Ife Empire, West Africa (c. 1200–1420)
- Oyo Empire, West Africa (from c. 1300)
- Kongo Empire, West Africa (from c. 1390)
- Kingdom of Nri, West Africa (from c. 1200?)

==== Pre-Columbian Americas ====
- Taíno
- Maya civilisation
- Toltec
- Mississippian culture
- Vinland
- Chimú
- Kingdom of Cuzco
- Aztec Empire
- Inca Empire

=== Early Modern period ===
==== Europe ====
- Kingdom of Poland
- Holy Roman Empire (see German Renaissance, early modern Germany )
- Kingdom of France, (see early modern France )
- Kingdom of England (before 1707)
- Kingdom of Scotland (before 1707)
- Kingdom of Great Britain (1707–1801)
- Habsburg Empire (1526–1867)

==== Colonial empires ====
- Spanish Empire (1492–1976)
- Portuguese Empire (1415–2002)
- Dutch Empire (1602–1975)
- British Empire (1583–1997)
- French Empire (1534–1980)
- American Empire (1898–1994)
- Belgian Empire (1908–1962)

==== Asia ====
- Ottoman Empire (1299–1922)
- Safavid Persia (1501–1736)
- Portuguese Macau (1557–1999)
- Zand dynasty (1750–1794)
- Edo shogunate (1603–1868)
- Qing Dynasty (1644–1912)
- Afsharid dynasty (1736–1796)
- Mughal Empire (1526–1858)
- Sikh Empire (1799–1849)

==== Sub-Saharan Africa ====
- Kingdom of Kongo
- Zulu Kingdom
- Kingdom of Rwanda

=== Modern history ===
==== Europe ====
- United Kingdom of Great Britain and Ireland (1801–1922)
- British rule in Ireland (1801–1922)
- French First Empire (1804–1814; 1815)
- Russian Empire (1721–1917)
- Austro-Hungarian Empire (1867–1918)
- Kingdom of Italy (1861–1946)
- French Second Empire (1852–1870)
- German Empire (1871–1918)
- French Third Republic (1870–1940)
- Fascist Italy (1922–1943)
- Nazi Germany (1933–1945)
- United Kingdom of Great Britain and Northern Ireland (since 1922)
- Ostmark (1938–1945)
- Soviet Union (1922–1991)
- East Germany (1949–1990)
- West Germany (1949–1990)
- Federal Republic of Germany (since 1990)

==== Asia ====
- Kingdom of Thailand (since 1939)
- Republic of Singapore (since 1965)
- Qing dynasty (1644–1912)
- Democratic People's Republic of Korea (from 1948)
- Republic of Korea (since 1948)
- Qajar dynasty (1794–1925)
- Manchukuo (1932–1945)
- British Hong Kong (1841–1997)
- British Raj (1858–1947)
- Empire of Japan (1868–1947)
- Chōsen (1910–1945)
- Republic of China (1912–1949)
- People's Republic of China (from 1949)
- Socialist Republic of Vietnam (from 1976)
- Partition of India (1947)
- Decline and modernization of the Ottoman Empire (1828–1908)
- Russian conquest of Central Asia (1839–1895)
- First Philippine Republic (1898–1901)

==== Middle East ====
- Syria
- United Arab Emirates (since 1971)
- Great Socialist People's Libyan Arab Jamahiriya

==== Africa ====
- European exploration of Africa
- Scramble for Africa
- Egypt
- Anglo-Egyptian Sudan
- Union of South Africa
- French Algeria
- French West Africa
- French Equatorial Africa
- French Madagascar
- Portuguese Angola
- German South West Africa
- Belgian Congo
- Italian Libya
- Italian East Africa
- Spanish Guinea
- Decolonisation
- List of sovereign states and dependent territories in Africa

==== Americas ====
- United States of America (from 1776)
- Empire of Haiti (1804–1806)
- Mexican Empire (1821–1823)
- Empire of Brazil (1822–1889)
- Federal Republic of Central America (1823–1841)
- Gran Colombia (1819–1831)
- Canadian Confederation (1867)

== Cultural and technological history ==
=== 11th century ===
- Firearms (c. 1100)

=== 13th century ===
- Rockets (c. 1200s)

=== 14th century ===
- Longbow (c. 1386)

=== 15th century ===
- Printing press (c. 1450)
- Accounting (c. 1494)

=== 16th century ===
- Probability (c. 1549)
- Thermometer (1596)

=== 17th century ===
- Barometer (1643)
- Calculus (c. 1680)

=== 18th century ===
- Electrostatic generator (1706)
- Steam engine (1712)
- Submarine (1775)
- Vaccination (1796)
- Electric battery (1800)

=== 19th century ===
- Steam locomotive (1804)
- Atomic theory (1808)
- Canned food (1809)
- Bicycle (1817)
- Telegraph (1832)
- Internal combustion engine (1833)
- Photography (1837)
- Anesthesia (1842)
- Plastic (1855)
- Natural selection (1858)
- Telephone (1860)
- Genetics (1866)
- Frozen food (1868)
- Steam turbine (1884)
- Automobile (1886)

=== 20th century ===
- Assembly line (1901)
- Airplane (1903)
- Special relativity (1905)
- Animation (1906)
- Aircraft carrier (1911)
- Tanks (1916)
- DNA (1928)
- Penicillin (1928)
- Sliced bread (1928)
- Television (1932)
- Quantum mechanics (1935)
- Computer (1939)
- Nuclear reactor (1942)
- Nuclear weapon (1945)
- Transistor (1947)
- Satellite (1957)
- Food processor (1960s)
- Internet (1969)
- Moon landing (1969)
- Space station (1971)
- Video games (1972)
- Self-driving car (1977)
- GPS navigation (1978)
- Reusable launch vehicle (1981)
- Finite geometry (1989)

== Calendar ==
The Julian calendar was used in Europe at the beginning of the millennium, and all countries that once used the Julian calendar had adopted the Gregorian calendar by the end of it. For this reason, the end date of the 2nd millennium is usually calculated based on the Gregorian calendar, while the beginning date is based on the Julian calendar (or occasionally the proleptic Gregorian calendar).

In the late 1990s, there was a dispute as to whether the millennium should be taken to end on December 31, 1999, or December 31, 2000. Stephen Jay Gould at the time argued there is no objective way of deciding this question. Associated Press reported that the third millennium began on 1 January 2001, but also reported that celebrations in the US were generally more subdued at the beginning of 2001, compared to the beginning of 2000. Many public celebrations for the end of the 2nd millennium were held on December 31, 1999 – January 1, 2000—with a few people marking the end of the millennium a year later.

== Centuries and decades ==
11th century	1000s	1010s	1020s	1030s	1040s	1050s	1060s	1070s	1080s	1090s
12th century	1100s	1110s	1120s	1130s	1140s	1150s	1160s	1170s	1180s	1190s
13th century	1200s	1210s	1220s	1230s	1240s	1250s	1260s	1270s	1280s	1290s
14th century	1300s	1310s	1320s	1330s	1340s	1350s	1360s	1370s	1380s	1390s
15th century	1400s	1410s	1420s	1430s	1440s	1450s	1460s	1470s	1480s	1490s
16th century	1500s	1510s	1520s	1530s	1540s	1550s	1560s	1570s	1580s	1590s
17th century	1600s	1610s	1620s	1630s	1640s	1650s	1660s	1670s	1680s	1690s
18th century	1700s	1710s	1720s	1730s	1740s	1750s	1760s	1770s	1780s	1790s
19th century	1800s	1810s	1820s	1830s	1840s	1850s	1860s	1870s	1880s	1890s
20th century	1900s	1910s	1920s	1930s	1940s	1950s	1960s	1970s	1980s	1990s
