= Island arc (disambiguation) =

Island arc may refer to:

- Island arcs, arc-shaped volcanic archipelagos
- Island Arc, journal
- Island arc, or Siren arc, a story arc in the Chiikawa series, adapted as the main plot in Chiikawa the Movie: The Secret of the Mermaid Island
