= Humaydi =

Humaydi may refer to:

- Humaydi (tribe), medieval Kurdish tribe
- al-Humaydi, surname
