= Chinese unification (disambiguation) =

Chinese unification or the unification of China most commonly refers to either of

- Qin's wars of unification (230–221 BC), the series of wars that unified China under the Qin king Ying Zheng, subsequently known as Qin Shihuang or Shi Huangdi
- Chinese unification, the potential future (re)unification of mainland China and Taiwan under a single government
- Chinese uniformity, a term referring to the traditional phenomenon and political thought of uniformity and unification in the Chinese history
- Han unification, the encoding unification of the Chinese language

Chinese unification may also refer to:

- Chu–Han Contention (206–202 BC), the series of wars that unified China under the Han dynasty
- Conquest of Wu by Jin (AD 280), the war that unified China under the Jin dynasty
- Sui conquest of Chen (589), the war that unified China under the Sui dynasty
- Transition from Sui to Tang (613–628), the series of wars that unified China under the Tang dynasty
- Song conquest of Northern Han (979), the series of wars that unified most of China under the Song dynasty
- Yuan conquest of China (1205–1279), the series of wars that unified China under the Yuan dynasty
- Red Turban Rebellion (1351–1368), the series of wars that unified China under the Ming dynasty
- Transition from Ming to Qing (1618–1683), the series of wars that unified China under the Qing dynasty
- Chinese Civil War (1927–1949 or later), the series of wars that unified most of China as the People's Republic of China
- Northeast Flag Replacement (1928), the submission of the Beiyang government in Manchuria to the Republic of China
- Handover of Hong Kong (1997), the return of colonial Hong Kong from the United Kingdom to the People's Republic of China
- Transfer of sovereignty over Macau (1999), the return of colonial Macau from Portugal to the People's Republic of China

== See also ==
- One China Policy
- Division of China (disambiguation)
