= 1028 =

Calendar year

1028 in various calendars
- Gregorian calendar: 1028; MXXVIII
- Ab urbe condita: 1781
- Armenian calendar: 477; ԹՎ ՆՀԷ
- Assyrian calendar: 5778
- Balinese saka calendar: 949–950
- Bengali calendar: 434–435
- Berber calendar: 1978
- English Regnal year: N/A
- Buddhist calendar: 1572
- Burmese calendar: 390
- Byzantine calendar: 6536–6537
- Chinese calendar: 丁卯年 (Fire Rabbit); 3725 or 3518 — to — 戊辰年 (Earth Dragon); 3726 or 3519
- Coptic calendar: 744–745
- Discordian calendar: 2194
- Ethiopian calendar: 1020–1021
- Hebrew calendar: 4788–4789
- Hindu calendars
- Vikram Samvat: 1084–1085
- Shaka Samvat: 949–950
- Kali Yuga: 4128–4129
- Holocene calendar: 11028
- Igbo calendar: 28–29
- Iranian calendar: 406–407
- Islamic calendar: 418–419
- Japanese calendar: Manju 5 / Chōgen 1 (長元元年)
- Javanese calendar: 930–931
- Julian calendar: 1028; MXXVIII
- Korean calendar: 3361
- Minguo calendar: 884 before ROC 民前884年
- Nanakshahi calendar: −440
- Seleucid era: 1339/1340 AG
- Thai solar calendar: 1570–1571
- Tibetan calendar: མེ་མོ་ཡོས་ལོ་ (female Fire-Hare); 1154 or 773 or 1 — to — ས་ཕོ་འབྲུག་ལོ་ (male Earth-Dragon); 1155 or 774 or 2

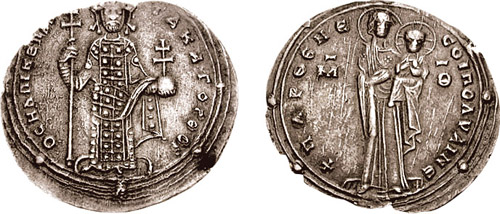
Silver miliaresion of Emperor Romanos III

Year 1028 (MXXVIII) was a leap year starting on Monday of the Julian calendar.

== Events ==
=== By place ===
==== Byzantine Empire ====
- November 11 – Emperor Constantine VIII dies at Constantinople after a 3-year reign. On his deathbed, and without a male heir, Constantine arranges that his eldest daughter, Zoë Porphyrogenita, succeeds him and marries the Byzantine nobleman, Romanos III (Argyros).
- November 15 – Zoë Porphyrogenita takes the throne as empress consort. Her husband, Romanos III (age 60) becomes emperor of the Byzantine Empire.

==== England ====
- Cnut the Great sails from England to Norway with a fleet of 50 ships. He defeats Olaf Haraldsson and is crowned king of Norway. Cnut becomes the sole ruler of England, Denmark and part of Sweden (known as the Danish North Sea Empire).

==== Europe ====
- April 14 – The 10-year-old Henry III (the Black), son of Emperor Conrad II (the Elder), is elected and crowned king of Germany in Aachen Cathedral by Pilgrim, archbishop of Cologne.
- King Sancho Garcés III (the Great) conquers Castile (modern Spain) (approximate date).

== Births ==
- February 17 – Al-Juwayni, Persian scholar and imam (d. 1085)
- Burchard II (or Bucco), bishop of Halberstadt (approximate date)
- Nuño Álvarez de Carazo, Spanish nobleman and warrior (d. 1054)
- Robert of Molesme, founder of the Cistercian Order (d. 1111)
- William I (the Conqueror), king of England (approximate date) (d. 1087)

== Deaths ==
- January 3 – Fujiwara no Michinaga, Japanese nobleman (b. 966)
- August 7 – Alfonso V (the Noble), king of León (Spain) (b. 994)
- November 11 – Constantine VIII, Byzantine emperor (b. 960)
- Lin Bu (or Junfu), Chinese poet and calligrapher (b. 967)
- Liu Wenzhi, Chinese official of the Song dynasty (b. 964)
- Lý Công Uẩn, founder of the Vietnamese Lý dynasty (b. 974)
- Qawam al-Dawla, Buyid governor and ruler of Kerman (b. 1000)
- Sayyida Shirin, Bavandid princess and wife of Fakhr al-Dawla
- William of Bellême, French nobleman (House of Bellême)
