= Shiqiao =

Shiqiao could refer to the following locations in China:

- Shiqiao station (Guangzhou Metro) (市桥站), station of Line 3 of the Guangzhou Metro
- Shiqiao station (Wuhan Metro), station of Line 6 of the Wuhan Metro

== Subdistricts ==
- Shiqiao Subdistrict, Guangzhou (市桥街道), in Panyu District, Guangzhou, Guangdong

Written as "石桥街道":

- Shiqiao Subdistrict, Dashiqiao, Jilin
- Shiqiao Subdistrict, Zibo, in Zhangdian District, Zibo, Shandong
- Shiqiao Subdistrict, Hangzhou, in Xiacheng District, Hangzhou, Zhejiang

== Towns ==
- Shiqiao, Dangtu County, Anhui
- Shiqiao, Lu'an (施桥镇), in Jin'an District, Lu'an, Anhui
- Shiqiao, Li County, Gansu, in Li County, Gansu
- Shiqiao, Cangwu County, in Cangwu County, Guangxi
- Shiqiao, Pan County, in Pan County, Guizhou
- Shiqiao, Baofeng County, Henan
- Shiqiao, Nanyang, Henan, in Wolong District, Nanyang, Henan
- Shiqiao, Xiangyang, in Xiangzhou District, Xiangyang, Hubei
- Shiqiao, Jiahe County, in Jiahe County, Hunan
- Shiqiao, Ganyu County, Jiangsu
- Shiqiao, Nanjing, in Pukou District, Nanjing, Jiangsu
- Shiqiao, Yongxin County, in Yongxin County, Jiangxi
- Shiqiao, Jining, in Rencheng District, Jining, Shandong
- Shiqiao, Da County, in Da County, Sichuan
- Shiqiao, Jianyang, Sichuan, in Jianyang, Sichuan
- Shiqiao, Lu County, in Lu County, Sichuan

== Townships ==
- Shiqiao Township, Li County, Gansu
- Shiqiao Township, Qingyuan County, Hebei
- Shiqiao Township, Linying County, Henan
- Shiqiao Township, Ningling County, Henan
- Shiqiao Township, Shaoyang, in Shuangqing District, Shaoyang, Hunan
- Shiqiao Township, Fuyu County, Jilin
- Shiqiao Township, Chunhua County, in Chunhua County, Shaanxi
- Shiqiao Township, Yiyuan County, Shandong
- Shiqiao Township, Danleng County, in Danleng County, Sichuan
- Shiqiao Township, Wusu, in Wusu City, Xinjiang
