= Abu'l-Faraj Muhammad =

Abu'l-Faraj Muhammad (Persian: ابوالقاسم فرج محمد), was an Iranian statesman Fasanjas family who served the Buyid dynasty.

He was the son Abu'l-Fadl al-Abbas ibn Fasanjas, a rich Iranian noble from the Fasanjas family which was native to Shiraz in Fars. He also had a brother named Abu Muhammad al-Fasanjas, whom he along with served as the head of the divan and treasurer. In 966, Mu'izz al-Dawla, the Buyid ruler of Iraq, sent Abu'l-Faraj and another Iranian officer named Abu'l Fadl Abbas ibn Husain Shirazi on an expedition to Oman. After the death of Mu'izz al-Dawla in 967, Abu'l-Faraj returned to Iraq, where he served the latter's successor Izz al-Dawla. He later retired in 970, and died in 981. He had a son named Abu'l-Qasim Jafar, who served as the vizier of the Buyid ruler Sultan al-Dawla.

== Sources ==
- Cahen, Cl. (1965). "Fasandjus". In Lewis, B.; Pellat, Ch. & Schacht, J. (eds.). The Encyclopaedia of Islam, Second Edition. Volume II: C–G. Leiden: E. J. Brill. p. 827. OCLC 495469475.
- Donohue, John J. (2003). The Buwayhid Dynasty in Iraq 334 H./945 to 403 H./1012: Shaping Institutions for the Future. Leiden and Boston: Brill. ISBN 90-04-12860-3.
- Kennedy, Hugh (2004). The Prophet and the Age of the Caliphates: The Islamic Near East from the 6th to the 11th Century (Second ed.). Harlow: Longman. ISBN 978-0-582-40525-7.
