= 966 =

Calendar year

966 in various calendars
Gregorian calendar	966; CMLXVI
Ab urbe condita	1719
Armenian calendar	415; ԹՎ ՆԺԵ
Assyrian calendar	5716
Balinese saka calendar	887–888
Bengali calendar	372–373
Berber calendar	1916
Buddhist calendar	1510
Burmese calendar	328
Byzantine calendar	6474–6475
Chinese calendar	乙丑年 (Wood Ox); 3663 or 3456 — to — 丙寅年 (Fire Tiger); 3664 or 3457
Coptic calendar	682–683
Discordian calendar	2132
Ethiopian calendar	958–959
Hebrew calendar	4726–4727
- Hindu calendars
Vikram Samvat	1022–1023
Shaka Samvat	887–888
Kali Yuga	4066–4067
Holocene calendar	10966
Iranian calendar	344–345
Islamic calendar	355–356
Japanese calendar	Kōhō 3 (康保３年)
Javanese calendar	866–867
Julian calendar	966; CMLXVI
Korean calendar	3299
Minguo calendar	946 before ROC 民前946年
Nanakshahi calendar	−502
Seleucid era	1277/1278 AG
Thai solar calendar	1508–1509
Tibetan calendar	ཤིང་མོ་གླང་ལོ་ (female Wood-Ox); 1092 or 711 or −61 — to — མེ་ཕོ་སྟག་ལོ་ (male Fire-Tiger); 1093 or 712 or −60

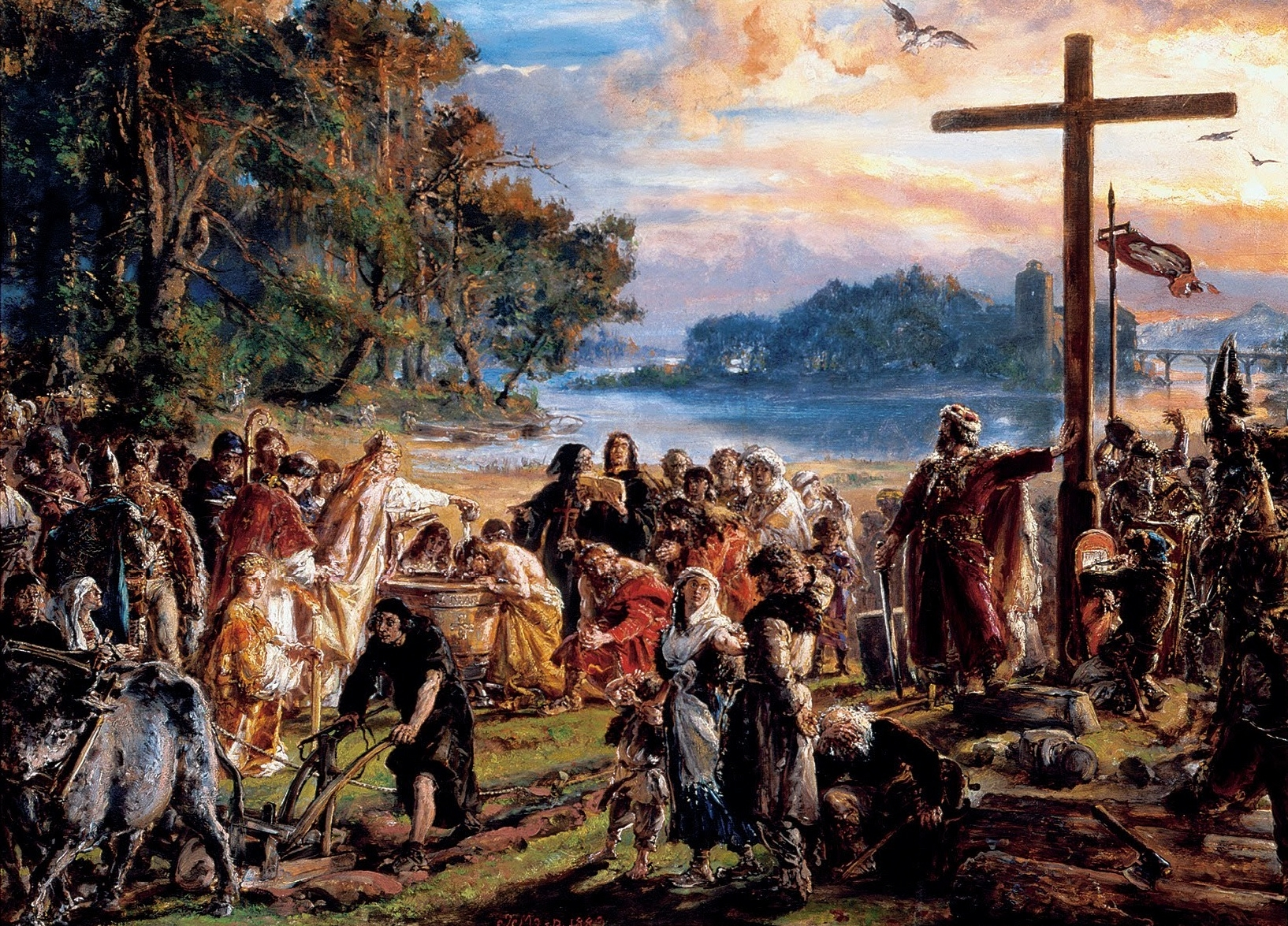
Christianization of Poland, depicted by Jan Matejko in 1889.

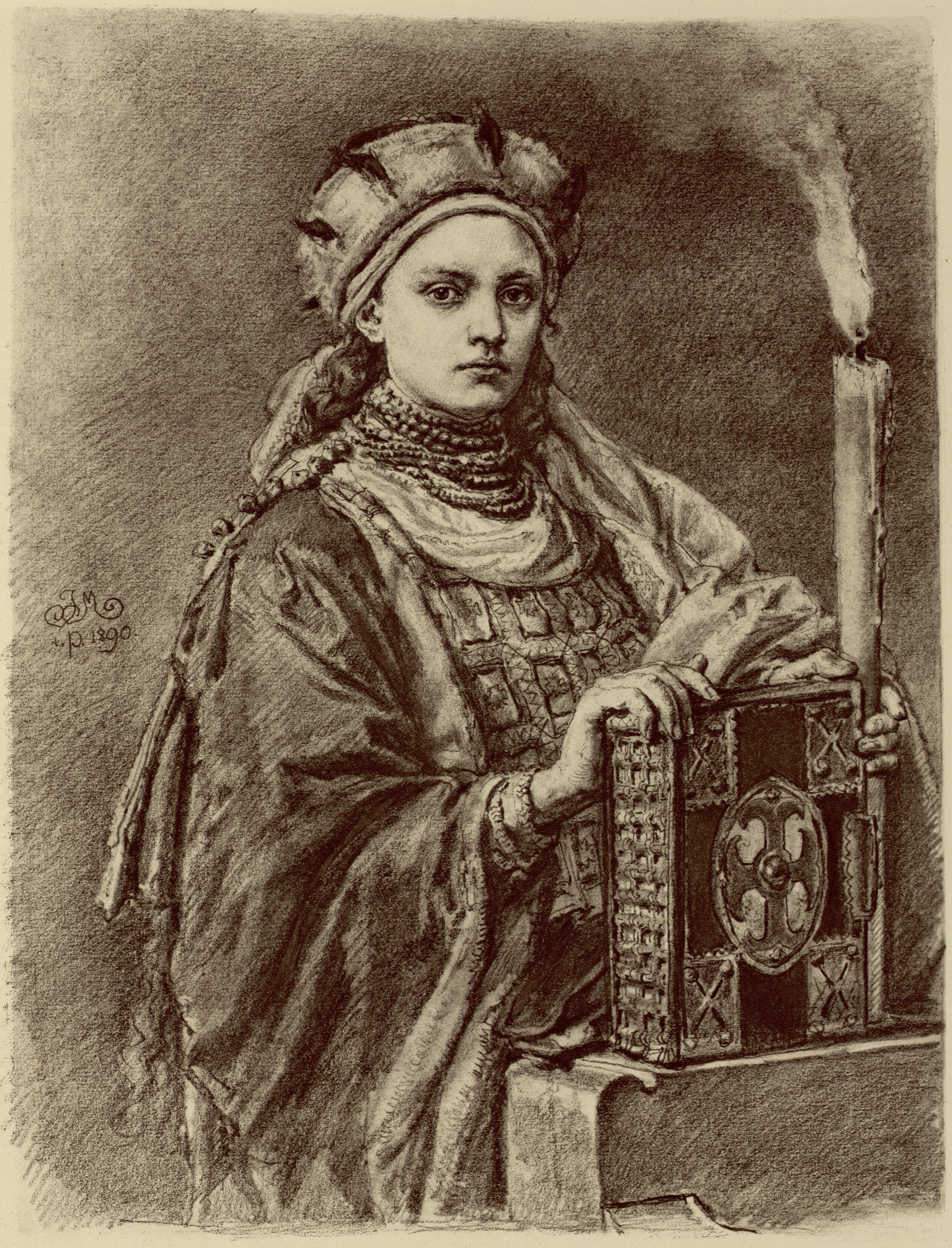
Doubravka of Bohemia, duchess of Poland, depicted by Jan Matejko in the 1890s.

Year 966 (CMLXVI) was a common year starting on Monday of the Julian calendar.

== Events ==
=== Byzantine Empire ===
- June 23 - Arab–Byzantine wars: A prisoner exchange occurs at the border between the Byzantine Empire and the Emirate of Aleppo at Samosata, headed by Emperor Nikephoros II and Sayf al-Dawla, the Emir of Aleppo. The Emirate receives 3,000 captured prisoners from the region of Cilicia, after its conquest by the Byzantine Emperor, as well as the poet Abu Firas al-Hamdani, who has previously been held prisoner by the Byzantines.

=== Europe ===
- Spring – King Lothair of France marries Princess Emma of Italy (the only daughter of Adelaide of Burgundy—second wife of Emperor Otto the Great, from her first marriage with King Lothair II, member of the Bosonid dynasty). Lothair strengthens his ties with the Holy Roman Empire. He temporarily remains in control of the cities of Arras and Douai. The latter becomes a flourishing textile market centre during the Middle Ages.
- April 14 – Mieszko I, first duke and prince of Poland, is baptized a Christian, which is usually considered the foundation of the Polish state. Mieszko's baptism, under the influence of his wife Doubravka of Bohemia, brings his territories into the community of Christian countries. The lands ruled by Mieszko cover about 250,000 km², and are inhabited by about 1.2 million people around this time.
- May – Pietro IV Candiano, doge of Venice, remarries to Waldrada of Tuscany, a daughter of Hubert, Duke of Spoleto, and a relative of Otto the Great. Waldrada brings him a large dowry, including the possessions of Ferrara, Friuli and Treviso (northern Italy).
- Fall – Otto the Great, Holy Roman Emperor, departs for a third expedition in Italy and fights in Lombardy against the partisans under Adalbert II of Ivrea. In November an imperial counter-coup in Rome takes control of Castel Sant'Angelo.
- Winter – Otto enters Rome and has the twelve principal militia leaders (the 'Decarcones') hanged. Other plotters of the coup are either executed or blinded. Otto is declared 'liberator of the Church'.
- The Hungarians invade the Bulgarian Empire and force Peter I, emperor (tsar) of the Bulgarians, to conclude a peace treaty with them. He lets them cross to attack the Byzantine Empire.

=== Asia ===
- February 9 – Ono no Michikaze (Ono no Tōfū), Japanese calligrapher, dies after having established the foundations of the 'Waystyle' of calligraphy while serving the imperial court at Heian-kyō (modern-day Kyoto).

=== By topic ===
==== Religion ====
- John VII, patriarch of Jerusalem, is burned at the stake by a Muslim mob after writing to Emperor Nikephoros II, pleading him to intervene in Palestine and retake it from the Fatimid Caliphate.
- Re-foundation of Peterborough (also called Medeshamstede) Abbey in England as a Benedictine monastery by Bishop Æthelwold of Winchester (approximate date).

== Births ==
- Ali al-Sulayhi, sultan of Yemen, Tihamah and Mecca (d. 1066)
- Fujiwara no Kintō, Japanese poet and bureaucrat (d. 1041)
- Fujiwara no Michinaga, Japanese nobleman (d. 1028)
- Hisham II, caliph of Córdoba (Spain) (d. 1013)
- Approximate date
- Ding Wei, grand chancellor of the Song dynasty (d. 1037)
- Gerberga of Burgundy, duchess of Swabia (or 965)
- Heonjeong, queen of Goryeo (Korea) (d. 992)
- Kenneth III, king of Scotland
- Louis V, king of the West Frankish Kingdom (d. 987)
- Lu Zongdao, Chinese official
- Sei Shōnagon, Japanese poet and court lady

== Deaths ==
- January 19 – Fujiwara no Asatada, Japanese nobleman (b. 910)
- January – Abu'l-Hasan Ali ibn al-Ikhshid, Ikhshidid governor
- February 9 – Ono no Michikaze, Japanese calligrapher (b. 894)
- March 28 – Flodoard, Frankish canon and chronicler
- c. May? – Rashiq al-Nasimi, Hamdanid governor
- August 4 – Berengar II, margrave and king of Italy
- November 12 – Abu Ishaq Ibrahim of Ghazna, Samanid governor
- December 19 – Sancho I, king of León (Spain)
- Bagrat II, prince of Tao-Klarjeti (Georgia)
- Bertha of Swabia, Frankish queen consort
- Cormac ua Cillín, abbot of Tuamgraney (Ireland)
- John VII, patriarch of Jerusalem (Israel), martyred
- Approximate date
- Nako, Obotrite prince
- Viśa' Saṃbhava, king of Khotan (China)
- Sergius I, duke of Amalfi (Italy)
