= 964 =

Calendar year

964 in various calendars
- Gregorian calendar: 964; CMLXIV
- Ab urbe condita: 1717
- Armenian calendar: 413; ԹՎ ՆԺԳ
- Assyrian calendar: 5714
- Balinese saka calendar: 885–886
- Bengali calendar: 370–371
- Berber calendar: 1914
- Buddhist calendar: 1508
- Burmese calendar: 326
- Byzantine calendar: 6472–6473
- Chinese calendar: 癸亥年 (Water Pig); 3661 or 3454 — to — 甲子年 (Wood Rat); 3662 or 3455
- Coptic calendar: 680–681
- Discordian calendar: 2130
- Ethiopian calendar: 956–957
- Hebrew calendar: 4724–4725
- Hindu calendars
- Vikram Samvat: 1020–1021
- Shaka Samvat: 885–886
- Kali Yuga: 4064–4065
- Holocene calendar: 10964
- Iranian calendar: 342–343
- Islamic calendar: 352–353
- Japanese calendar: Ōwa 4 / Kōhō 1 (康保元年)
- Javanese calendar: 864–865
- Julian calendar: 964; CMLXIV
- Korean calendar: 3297
- Minguo calendar: 948 before ROC 民前948年
- Nanakshahi calendar: −504
- Seleucid era: 1275/1276 AG
- Thai solar calendar: 1506–1507
- Tibetan calendar: ཆུ་མོ་ཕག་ལོ་ (female Water-Boar); 1090 or 709 or −63 — to — ཤིང་ཕོ་བྱི་བ་ལོ་ (male Wood-Rat); 1091 or 710 or −62

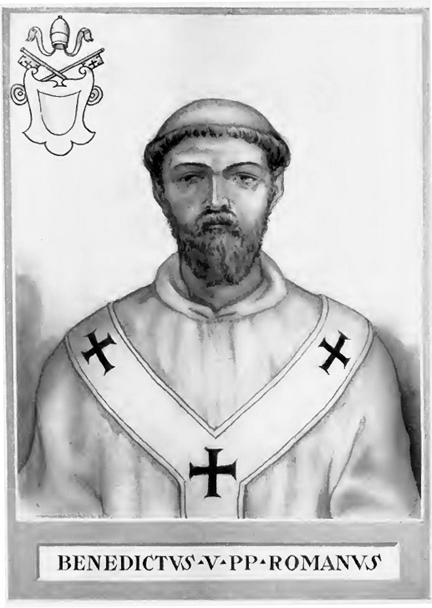
Pope Benedict V (May 22–June 23)

Year 964 (CMLXIV) was a leap year starting on Friday of the Julian calendar.

== Events ==
=== Byzantine Empire ===
- Arab–Byzantine War: Emperor Nikephoros II continues the reconquest of south-eastern Anatolia (modern Turkey). He recaptured Cyprus through Niketas Chalkoutzes, and reorganizes the conquered lands into new themes. In the summer, they take the fortress cities of Anazarbus and Adana. Byzantine troops under General John Tzimiskes besiege Mopsuestia, but with the coming of winter he is forced to retreat to Caesarea.
- October 24–25 – Siege of Rometta: Nikephoros II sends an expedition to Sicily. The Byzantine army (40,000 men) is sent to break the Muslim siege at Rometta, and to regain Sicily for the Byzantine Empire. For two days a battle takes place in the area between the beach and the besieged citadel of Rometta. The Saracens (under Al-Hasan ibn Ammar) manage to defeat the Byzantine relief force.

=== Europe ===
- Spring – King Adalbert II returns to the mainland of Italy, and occupies the environs of Spoleto. Emperor Otto I ('the Great') leaves Rome with his army, and lays siege to the fortress city of Spoleto.
- Otto I proceeds on campaign in Italy, remaining in the environs of Lucca. In the fall he leaves plague-wracked Tuscany, and is forced to retreat to Liguria. His rearguard is attacked by Adalbert II.

=== By topic ===
==== Religion ====
- February – Pope John XII returns with his supporters to Rome. He convenes a synod that deposes Antipope Leo VIII who finds refuge at the court of Otto I. John dispatches a delegation under Otgar, bishop of Speyer, to negotiate an agreement.
- May 14 – Pope John XII dies (rumoured to be by apoplexy, or at the hands of a cuckolded husband, during an illicit sexual liaison) after a 9-year reign. The Romans elect Benedict V, who is acclaimed by the city militia. He begins his pontificate as the 131st pope of the Catholic Church.
- June 23 – Benedict V is deposed and ecclesiastically degraded after Otto I besieges Rome. He starves the Romans into submission and restores Leo VIII to the papal throne.

==== Science ====
- Abd al-Rahman al-Sufi, a Persian astronomer, writes the Book of Fixed Stars

== Births ==
- Bertha of Burgundy, Frankish queen consort (d. 1010)
- Heonae, Korean queen consort and regent (d. 1029)
- Liu Wenzhi, official of the Song Dynasty (d. 1028)

== Deaths ==
- May 14 – John XII, pope of the Catholic Church
- July 3 – Henry I, Frankish nobleman and archbishop
- November 5 – Fan Zhi, chancellor of the Song Dynasty
- December 8 – Zhou (the Elder), Chinese queen consort
- Al-Hasan ibn Ali al-Kalbi, Fatimid nobleman and emir
- Fujiwara no Anshi, empress consort of Japan (b. 927)
- Godfrey I, count and vice-duke of Lower Lorraine
- Khosrov of Andzev, Armenian monk and poet
- Toichleach ua Gadhra, king of Gailenga (Ireland)
