= Song conquest of Northern Han =

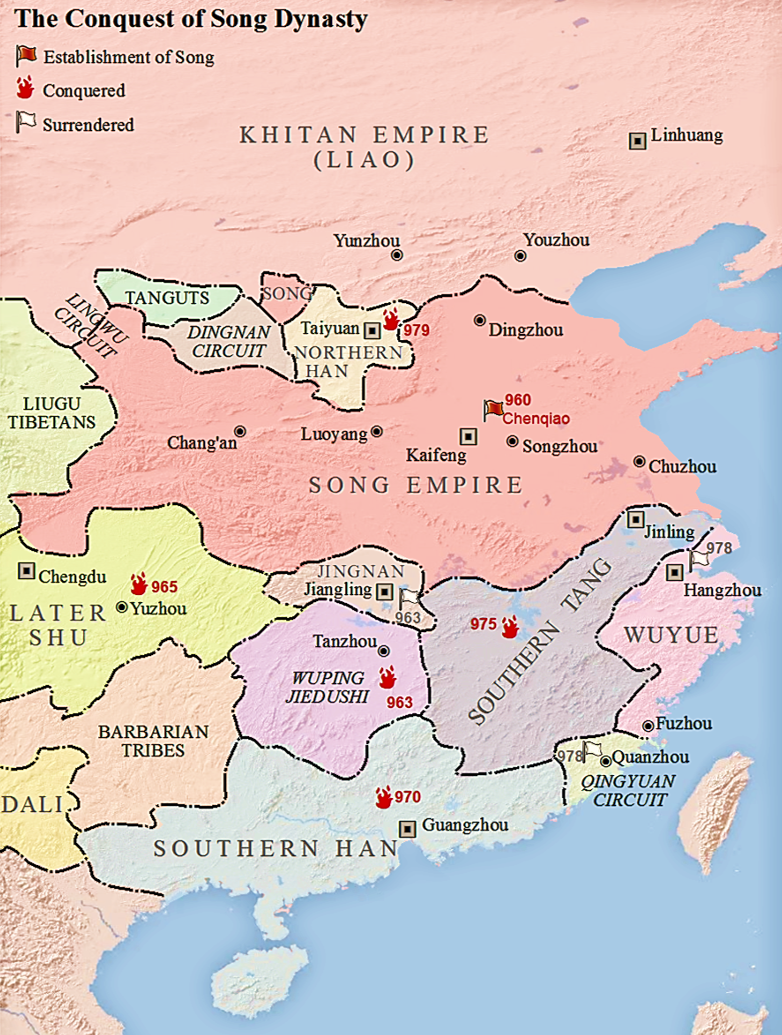
Date	February – 3 June 979
Location	Northern Han (present-day Shanxi)
Result	Surrender of Northern Han; annexation of Northern Han by Northern Song; end of the Five Dynasties and Ten Kingdoms period

Belligerents
Northern Song dynasty	Northern Han dynasty Liao dynasty

Commanders and leaders
Emperor Taizong of Song; Pan Mei; Cui Yanjin; Li Hanqiong; Cao Han; Liu Yu; Mi Xin; Tian Chongjin; Guo Jin	Northern Han: Emperor Yingwu of Northern Han (surrendered); Fan Chao (surrendered); Guo Wanchao (surrendered); Yang Ye (surrendered); Liao: Yelü Sha; Yelü Xiezhen; Yelü Dilie †

The Song conquest of Northern Han (Chinese: 宋滅北漢之戰) occurred in 979, when Northern Song forces captured the Northern Han capital of Taiyuan in present-day Shanxi Province after a two-month siege. A relief attempt by forces of the Liao dynasty, which was allied to the Northern Han, was easily defeated by the Northern Song. Yelü Dilie, a cousin of the Emperor Jingzong of Liao, was killed along with Yelü Sha's son Yelü Deli (耶律德裏).

== Notes and references ==
- (in Chinese) Li Tao (1183). Xu Zizhi Tongjian Changbian (續資治通鑑長編) [Extended Continuation to Zizhi Tongjian].
