= Division of China =

Division of China may refer to:

== Administrative ==
- Administrative divisions of China, levels of local government in the People's Republic of China
- Administrative divisions of Taiwan, statutory subdivisions of the Republic of China

== Historical eras and events ==
- Spring and Autumn period, historical period (771–476 BC) in which China was divided between many feudal states under the authority of the Zhou dynasty
- Warring States period, historical period (475–221 BC) in which China was divided between multiple rivalling states
- Three Kingdoms (AD 220–280), historical tripartite division of China among the states of Cao Wei, Shu Han and Eastern Wu
- Sixteen Kingdoms, historical period (AD 304–439) when northern China was fragmented into rivalling short-lived states
- Northern and Southern dynasties, historical period (AD 386–589) when China was divided in a north-south fashion
- Five Dynasties and Ten Kingdoms period, historical period (AD 907–979) of political upheaval and division in Imperial China
- Warlord Era, a period (1916–1928) when control of the Republic of China was divided among military cliques
- Chinese Civil War (1927–1937, 1946–1950) and the Cross-Strait conflict resulted in the division of the country into communist-controlled mainland and the incumbent government fleeing to Taiwan.

== See also ==
- Administrative divisions of China (disambiguation)
- Chinese unification (disambiguation)
- People's Liberation Army, the armed forces of the People's Republic of China, which includes various military divisions
