= Abu'l-Fadl al-Abbas ibn Fasanjas =

Abu'l-Faḍl al-ʻAbbas ibn Fasanjas (Persian: ابوالفضل عباس بن فسانجس), was an Iranian statesman Fasanjas family who served the Buyid dynasty.

He was from a rich Iranian noble family which was native to Shiraz in Fars. When the Buyid ruler Imad al-Dawla conquered Shiraz, Abu'l-Faḍl pledged allegiance to him, and supplied him with money so he could pay his Daylamite troops. Abu'l-Faḍl later served Mu'izz al-Dawla, who was the brother of Imad al-Dawla and ruler of Iraq. Abu'l-Faḍl, during his stay in Iraq, became the financial minister of Basra, and later died in 953 at the age of 77. He had two sons named Abu'l-Faraj Muhammad and Abu Muhammad al-Fasanjas, who also served the Buyids under high office.

== Sources ==
- Cahen, Cl. (1965). "Fasandjus". In Lewis, B.; Pellat, Ch. & Schacht, J. (eds.). The Encyclopaedia of Islam, Second Edition. Volume II: C–G. Leiden: E. J. Brill. p. 827. OCLC 495469475.
- Donohue, John J. (2003). The Buwayhid Dynasty in Iraq 334 H./945 to 403 H./1012: Shaping Institutions for the Future. Leiden and Boston: Brill. ISBN 90-04-12860-3.
- Kennedy, Hugh (2004). The Prophet and the Age of the Caliphates: The Islamic Near East from the 6th to the 11th Century (Second ed.). Harlow: Longman. ISBN 978-0-582-40525-7.
