= 1026 Manju tsunami =

Tsunami affecting Japan

- Location within Japan
- Local date: June 16, 1026
- Magnitude: M_{JMA} 7.8
- Epicenter: 34.8°N 131.8°E
- Areas affected: Iwami Province, Japan
- Tsunami: 10 m (33 ft)
- Casualties: >1,000 dead

The 1026 Manju tsunami affected the Sea of Japan coast of the then Iwami Province on June 16. Considered one of the largest tsunamis in the Sea of Japan, it generated a tsunami with waves of 10 m (33 ft) at present-day Masuda, Shimane. Off the coast, an island reportedly sank because of the waves. More than 1,000 people were killed, and 3,000 homes were destroyed. The source of the tsunami has been debated between an earthquake or undersea landslide.

== Description ==
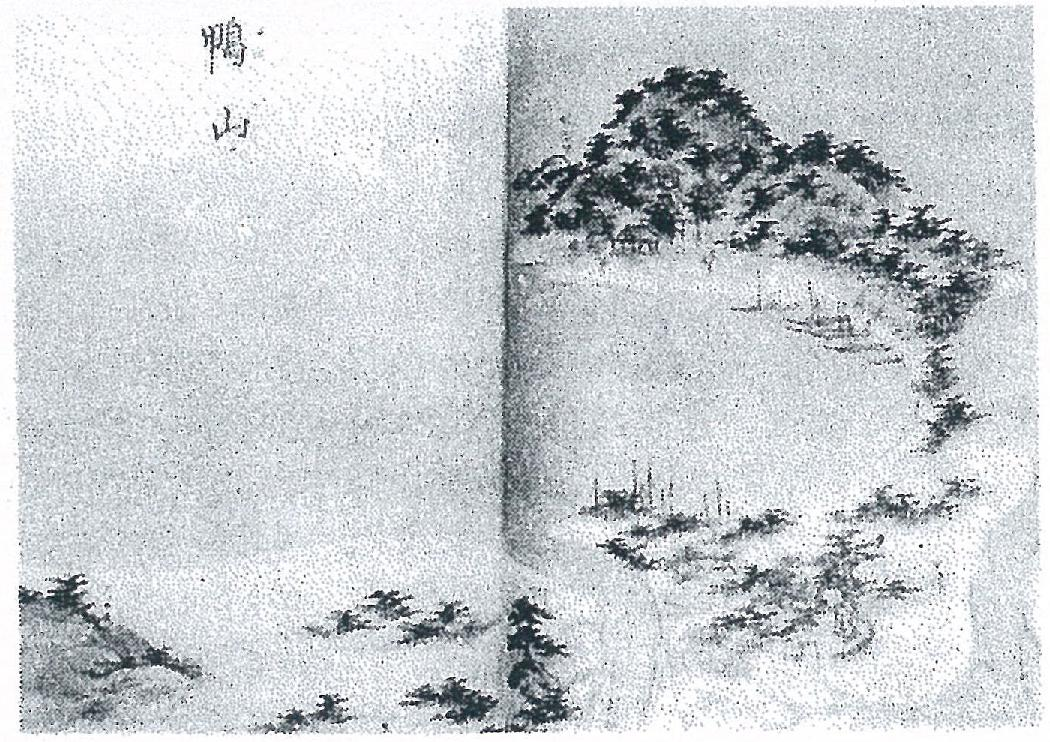
An artist's impression of Kamojima, which allegedly sank into the sea after an earthquake

In historical records, locals claimed that a large stone called Kuroiwa was carried by the tsunami to its present location in Tonda, along Japan National Route 9 about 3.5 km (2.2 mi) from Masuda Station. The 5 m (16 ft) tall stone was allegedly carried 2 km (1.2 mi) from the coast at an elevation of 25 m (82 ft). A subsequent investigation revealed the stone, comprising basalt, originated from the inland mountains, as basalts do not occur at the coast, and was transported downhill by a landslide rather than the reported tsunami.

The tsunami reportedly sank the islands of Kamo, Nabeshima, and Kashiwajima, which were then busy settlements. Oral records suggest these features were solid outcrops rather than sandbars. Kamo Island was located 1 km (0.62 mi) off the coast of Takasu and was 2 km (1.2 mi) long by 0.3 km (0.19 mi) wide. When the tsunami struck Takatsu and the Masuda River mouth, its waves were about 2 m (6 ft 7 in). Subsidence occurred at Hamada, and there was no record of a tsunami. The waves destroyed the Hitomaro Shrine on Kamo Island and dumped the resident statue of Kakinomoto no Hitomaro in Masuda.

In the Toinomawari area of Masuda, the tsunami overwhelmed a sand dune embankment and buried the surrounding land. The waves advanced towards Kamitonoma, flooding Shimotonoma and Nakatonoma along the way. It caused massive devastation to farmland and properties; many people also went missing. Tonomawari Bay became so overwhelmed with debris that it was impassable for ships. At the Oko ward of the city, the waves reached the foot of Mount Eboshi and carried marine life inland. The statue of Kakinomoto no Hitomaro was retrieved and placed in the Matsuzaki Hitomaro Shrine before subsequently relocating to the Kakimoto Shrine in Takatsu. Another temple on Kamo Island, Senpukuji, was reconstructed, while Manpukuji was never rebuilt. Many other relics, such as three statues of Vaiśravaṇa, a Han dynasty mirror, and a pair of cymbals, were recovered. Ruins of an ancient pagoda buried by the tsunami deposit were revealed after a flood in 1729.

Near Gōtsu Station, Gōtsu, the tsunami destroyed 1,000 homes, while more than 500 temples and homes were damaged. Along the Shioda coast, the tsunami washed away three islets. It travelled up the Gōnokawa River and was recorded in Ochi District; the tsunami was also reported as far east as Kuromatsucho.

== Tsunami evidence ==
In 1994, Island Arc published the discovery of a sand layer about 1.5 m (4 ft 11 in) beneath the Masuda coastal plain, which could only be explained as the result of a tsunami inundation. This layer comprised mud and medium-to-fine-grained sand that originated from the sea. These materials, comprising coarse sediment grains and brackish benthic diatoms, were mixed with the estuary mud under tsunami-like conditions. The absence of bedded grading also suggests these materials had to be quickly transported onto the plain. A piece of wood from the excavated area, above the tsunami layer, was radiocarbon dated to 930±80 years before present, suggesting the layer may be evidence of the June 16, 1026 event. A water tank experiment suggests the tsunami was triggered by an undersea landslide, and a preserved landslide topography in the Sea of Japan may represent that trigger event. A numerical modelling estimated the mass failure volume at 8.6 km^{3} (2.1 cu mi). The historical record does not document any seismic shaking from an earthquake before the tsunami arrived at the coast; however, should an earthquake occur, its magnitude would be estimated at M_{JMA} 7.8.

== See also ==
- List of earthquakes in Japan
- List of tsunamis
