= 1093 =

1093 in various calendars
Gregorian calendar	1093; MXCIII
Ab urbe condita	1846
Armenian calendar	542; ԹՎ ՇԽԲ
Assyrian calendar	5843
Balinese saka calendar	1014–1015
Bengali calendar	499–500
Berber calendar	2043
English Regnal year	6 Will. 2 – 7 Will. 2
Buddhist calendar	1637
Burmese calendar	455
Byzantine calendar	6601–6602
Chinese calendar	壬申年 (Water Monkey); 3790 or 3583 — to — 癸酉年 (Water Rooster); 3791 or 3584
Coptic calendar	809–810
Discordian calendar	2259
Ethiopian calendar	1085–1086
Hebrew calendar	4853–4854
- Hindu calendars
Vikram Samvat	1149–1150
Shaka Samvat	1014–1015
Kali Yuga	4193–4194
Holocene calendar	11093
Igbo calendar	93–94
Iranian calendar	471–472
Islamic calendar	485–486
Japanese calendar	Kanji 7 (寛治７年)
Javanese calendar	997–998
Julian calendar	1093; MXCIII
Korean calendar	3426
Minguo calendar	819 before ROC 民前819年
Nanakshahi calendar	−375
Seleucid era	1404/1405 AG
Thai solar calendar	1635–1636
Tibetan calendar	阳水猴年 (male Water-Monkey); 1219 or 838 or 66 — to — 阴水鸡年 (female Water-Rooster); 1220 or 839 or 67

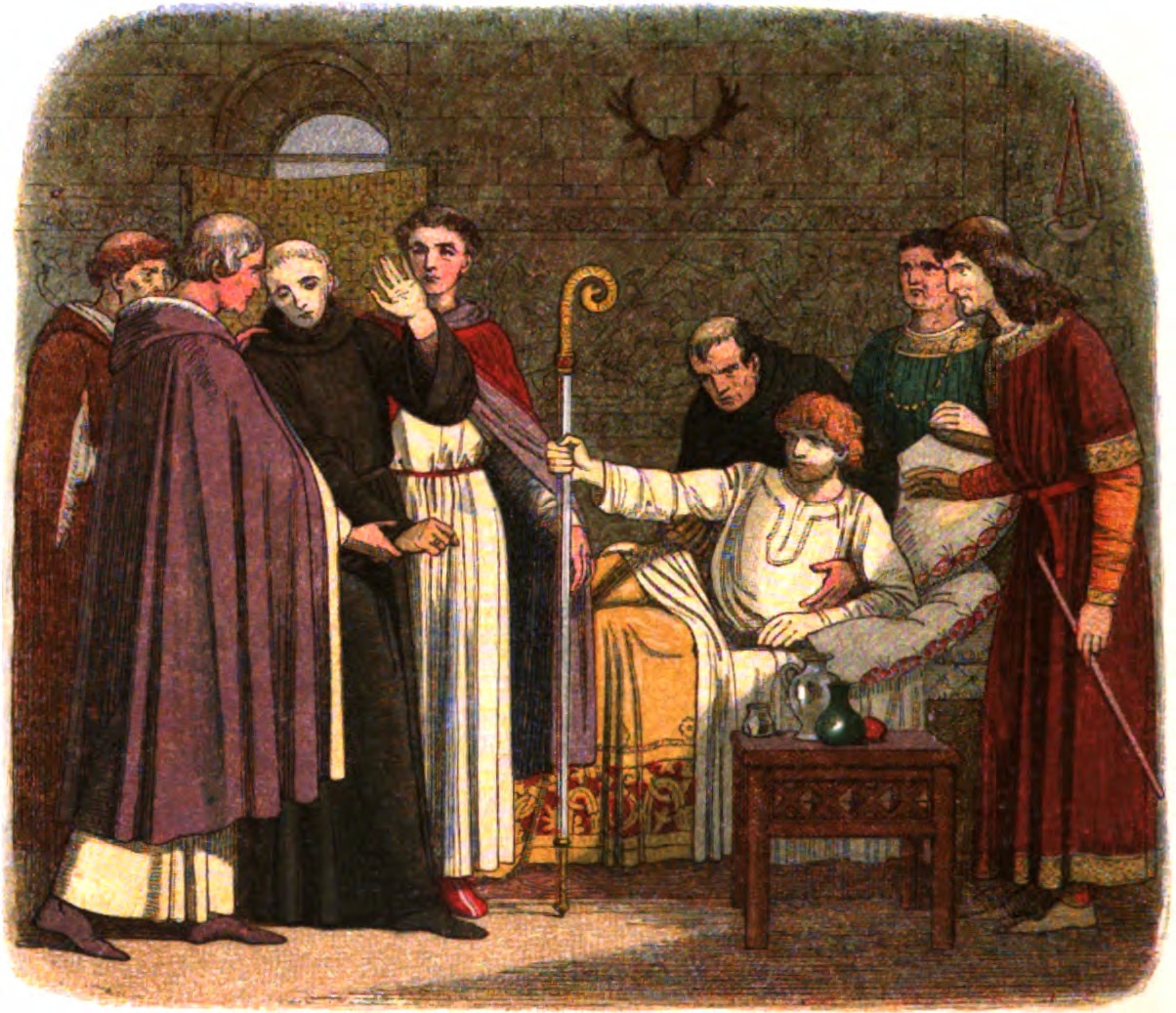
Anselm (right) is dragged to the cathedral and made archbishop of Canterbury.

Year 1093 (MXCIII) was a common year starting on Saturday of the Julian calendar.

== Events ==
=== By place ===
==== Europe ====
- April 13 –The Grand Prince of Kiev Vsevolod I Yaroslavich dies, after a 15-year reign. He is succeeded by Sviatopolk II, who is acknowledged by other princes as the senior son of Iziaslav I, and ascends the Kievan throne as ruler of the Kievan Rus'. His cousin Vladimir II, prince of Chernigov, becomes a bitter rival.
- May 26 – Battle of the Stugna River: The nomadic Cumans defeat a Kievan joint force led by the princes of Kievan Rus' at the Stuhna River in the valley near Trepol. Rostislav Vsevolodovich, prince of Pereyaslavl, drowns while fleeing the battle.
- September 22 – King Olaf III of Norway ("the Peaceful") dies after a 26-year reign. He is succeeded by his son Magnus Barefoot who is proclaimed ruler of Norway at the Borgarting (or the Thing), an assembly of lawspeakers, in the region of Viken.

==== Britain ====
- March 6 – Anselm, Italian Benedictine abbot and theologian, becomes archbishop of Canterbury in England, succeeding Lanfranc. The post of archbishop has been left vacant since 1089 by King William II of England – so he can collect the church's income for himself.
- November 13 – Battle of Alnwick: King Malcolm III of Scotland invades Northumberland, but is killed by English forces under Earl Robert de Mowbray while besieging Alnwick Castle. He is succeeded by his brother Donald III ("the Fair") as ruler of Scotland.
- The Normans under Lord Robert Fitzhamon continue their occupation of southern Wales with Pembroke Castle being constructed by Arnulf de Montgomery.

=== By topic ===
==== Religion ====
- April 8 – Monks move into the new Winchester Cathedral in England, constructed by the Norman bishop Walkelin.
- August 11 – Construction of Durham Cathedral in England begins, replacing the Saxon 'White Church'.

== Births ==
- January 16 – Isaac Komnenos, Byzantine co-ruler
- Ahmad Yasawi, Turkic poet and Sufi (d. 1166)
- Baldwin VII, count of Flanders (d. 1119)
- Conrad III, king of Italy and Germany (d. 1152)
- Demetrius I, king of Georgia (approximate date)
- Gerhoh of Reichersberg, German theologian (d. 1169)
- Grigor III, Armenian catholicos of Cilicia (d. 1166)
- Robert fitzEdith, English feudal lord (d. 1172)
- Sancho Alfónsez, Spanish nobleman (d. 1108)
- Simon of Hauteville, count of Sicily (d. 1105)
- Simon of Vermandois, French bishop (d. 1148)
- William III, count of Ponthieu (approximate date)

== Deaths ==
- February 1 – Abul Hasan Hankari, Abbasid scholar (b. 1018)
- April – Rhys ap Tewdwr, Welsh king of Deheubarth, killed in battle (b. 997)
- April 13 – Vsevolod I Yaroslavich, Grand Prince of Kiev (b. 1030)
- May 26 – Rostislav Vsevolodovich, prince of Pereyaslavl
- June 21 – Ja'far ibn Abdallah al-Muqtadi, Abbasid prince, son of al-Muqtadi and Mah-i Mulk
- July 10 – Ulrich of Zell, German Cluniac reformer (b. 1029)
- August 4 – Alan Rufus, Breton/Norman nobleman (approximate year)
- August 24 – Geoffrey Boterel, Breton nobleman, eldest brother of Alan Rufus
- August 29 – Hugh I, Duke of Burgundy, French nobleman and abbot (b. 1057)
- September 22 – Olaf III "the Peaceful", king of Norway
- October 13 – Robert I, Count of Flanders
- November 13 – Malcolm III, king of Scotland (b. 1031)
- November 16 – Margaret, queen consort of Scotland (b. 1045)
- Bertrand II, count of Provence (approximate date)
- Constance of Burgundy, queen consort of Castile and León (b. 1046)
- Gao, Chinese empress (Song dynasty) (b. 1032)
- Iestyn ap Gwrgant, Welsh king of Morgannwg (b. 1014)
- Kaoruko, Japanese empress consort (b. 1029)
- Odo V (or Eudes), count of Troyes and Meaux
- Tzachas, Seljuk general and usurper, killed
- Wang Shen, Chinese painter and poet
