= Ding Wei (Song dynasty) =

- 丁謂

Grand Councilor of the Song dynasty
- In office August 12, 1020 – July 26, 1022
- Monarchs: Emperor Zhenzong, Emperor Renzong

Personal details
- Born: 966 or January 967 Sū Prefecture, Wuyue
- Died: June 1037 (aged 70–71) Guāng Prefecture, Song dynasty
- Spouse: Lady Dou (竇)
- Children: Ding Gong (丁珙), son; Ding Xu (丁珝), son; Ding Qi (丁玘), son; Ding Wu (丁珷), son; 1 daughter
- Parent: Ding Hao (丁顥) (father)

Ding Wei
- Traditional Chinese: 丁謂
- Simplified Chinese: 丁谓
Transcriptions
Standard Mandarin
- Hanyu Pinyin: Dīng Wèi
- Wade–Giles: Ting^{1} Wei^{4}

Ding Gongyan
- Chinese: 丁公言
Transcriptions
Standard Mandarin
- Hanyu Pinyin: Dīng Gōngyán

Ding Wei (c. 966 – June 1037), courtesy name Gongyan, was a Song dynasty chancellor, who dominated the courts during Emperor Zhenzong's later reign and Emperor Renzong's early reign.

Ding Wei's opponent Wang Zeng (王曾) claimed that Ding was considered one of the "Five Devils", along with Wang Qinruo, Lin Te (林特), Chen Pengnian (陳彭年) and Liu Chenggui (劉承珪), a group of high-ranking ministers unpopular at the time. In the centuries to follow, Ding Wei has almost always been portrayed as a treacherous minister in popular fiction.

== Early career ==
Ding Wei once wrote a prose essay with his friend Sun He (孫何) that quite impressed Wang Yucheng, a leading literati. Wang Yucheng considered their writing the best in China since Han Yu and Liu Zongyuan almost two centuries ago. In 992, Ding Wei passed the imperial examination and became the controller-general of Raozhou. A year later, he accompanied the crown prince Zhao Yuankan to inspect Fujian. Upon his return, he presented a report on salt and tea, and was made fiscal commissioner.

== Notes and references ==
- (in Chinese) Toqto'a; et al., eds. (1345). Song Shi (宋史) [History of Song].
- (in Chinese) Li Tao (1183). Xu Zizhi Tongjian Changbian (續資治通鑑長編) [Extended Continuation to Zizhi Tongjian].
