= Lu Zongdao =

Official of the Song dynasty

Lu Zongdao (魯宗道)

Personal details
- Born: c. 966; Qiao, Bo Prefecture, Song
- Died: c. 1029

Lu Zongdao
- Traditional Chinese: 魯宗道
- Simplified Chinese: 鲁宗道
Transcriptions
Standard Mandarin
- Hanyu Pinyin: Lǔ Zōngdào

Lu Guanzhi
- Traditional Chinese: 魯貫之
- Simplified Chinese: 鲁贯之
Transcriptions
Standard Mandarin
- Hanyu Pinyin: Lǔ Guànzhī

Lu Zongdao (c. 966 – c. 1029), courtesy name Guanzhi, was a high-ranking official of the Song dynasty. An honest and courageous minister, he played a key role in keeping Empress Dowager Liu's imperial ambitions in check.

== Early life ==
Lu Zongdao was orphaned during childhood, and he was raised by his maternal family. His maternal uncles were all soldiers devoted to his learning, and Lu Zongdao also studied very hard. After passing the imperial examination, Lu Zongdao was assigned to Dingyuan District (in Hao Prefecture) where he first assumed the position of a defender, later becoming the director of sea salt. To the southeast of the district was a sea harbor, but years of sediment had blocked the water flow. Lu Zongdao thus initiated a hydraulic engineering project in which laborers reconnected the harbor to the sea, and the harbor was then known as "Shore of Lord Lu".

== During Emperor Zhenzong's reign ==
After Dingyuan, Lu Zongdao successively served as the military administrative assistant of She Prefecture and assistant director of the Palace Library. In 1017, due to an excellent record, Lu Zongdao was appointed "right exhorter", responsible for monitoring documents passing to and from the emperor and the Secretariat. Lu Zongdao had wanted to talk to the emperor about a multitude of issues, but the emperor was very annoyed by his frequent memorials. During an audience with the emperor, Lu Zongdao then said,

"Did your majesty appoint me only to pretend to take advice? Personally, I feel ashamed if I receive wages but do not perform my duties. So I ask your majesty to relieve me of my post."

The emperor thought about the matter for a long time. One day, missing Lu Zongdao, he wrote the characters "Honest Lu" (魯直; "Lu Zhi") on the palace wall. Lu Zongdao was further promoted to vice director of the Bureau of Revenue, while simultaneous serving as an adviser under the heir apparent (Zhao Zhen).

At that time, Lu Zongdao lived close to a restaurant which he frequented to drink. Once, an imperial messenger carrying the emperor's urgent summon had to wait at his residence for a long time before Lu Zongdao returned from the restaurant. The messenger asked him what he would say if the emperor criticized his tardiness. Lu Zongdao replied that he would just tell the truth. The messenger warned him that he would be punished, but Lu Zongdao replied:

"Drinking wine is a normal human activity, but lying to the emperor is a great crime for a minister."

The messenger returned and reported what Lu said. When the emperor questioned him, Lu Zongdao replied:

"I had visitors arrive from my hometown. Because I am poor and do not own enough cups and plates in my house, I drank with them at the restaurant."

The emperor was impressed by his honesty. Therefore, he would frequently mention Lu Zongdao's name to his wife Empress Liu as someone trustworthy.

== During Empress Dowager Liu's regency ==
Once, the empress dowager asked him what he thought of the infamous Empress Wu during the Tang dynasty. Lu Zongdao replied,

"She was a Tang criminal who endangered the dynastic altar."

Empress Dowager Liu fell silent.

== Notes and references ==
- Chaffee, John (2001). "The Rise and Regency of Empress Liu (969–1033)". Journal of Song-Yuan Studies (31): 1–25.
- (in Chinese) Toqto'a; et al., eds. (1345). Song Shi (宋史) [History of Song].
- Li, Tao (1183). 《續資治通鑑長編》 [Extended Continuation to Zizhi Tongjian] (in Literary Chinese).
