= Abu'l-Qasim Ja'far ibn Muhammad ibn Fasanjus =

Buyid vizier

Abu'l-Qasim Ja'far ibn Muhammad ibn Fasanjus (Persian: ابوالقاسم جعفر), was an Iranian statesman from the Fasanjus family who served the Buyid dynasty.

Ja'far was born in Baghdad in 965/6. He was the son of Abu'l-Faraj Muhammad, who had served as a de facto vizier (without the actual title) in 963–967, and as full vizier in 970–971.

Ja'far was appointed by the Buyid ruler Sultan al-Dawla as his vizier in 1018/9, after the flight of the previous incumbent, al-Hasan ibn Fadl ibn Sahlan. Ja'far held the office only briefly, as he and his brothers were arrested in autumn 1019.

Ja'far died at Khuzistan in 1029. He had a son known as Dhu'l-Sa'adat, who served as vizier under the Buyid ruler Abu Kalijar until his execution in February 1049.

== Sources ==
- Busse, Heribert (2004) [1969]. Chalif und Grosskönig - Die Buyiden im Irak (945-1055) [Caliph and Great King - The Buyids in Iraq (945-1055)] (in German). Würzburg: Ergon Verlag. ISBN 3-89913-005-7.
- Cahen, Cl. (1965). "Fasandjus". In Lewis, B.; Pellat, Ch. & Schacht, J. (eds.). The Encyclopaedia of Islam, Second Edition. Volume II: C–G. Leiden: E. J. Brill. p. 827. OCLC 495469475.
- Donohue, John J. (2003). The Buwayhid Dynasty in Iraq 334 H./945 to 403 H./1012: Shaping Institutions for the Future. Leiden and Boston: Brill. ISBN 90-04-12860-3.
- Kennedy, Hugh (2004). The Prophet and the Age of the Caliphates: The Islamic Near East from the 6th to the 11th Century (Second ed.). Harlow: Longman. ISBN 978-0-582-40525-7.
