= Indonesia–Suriname relations =

- Indonesia: Suriname

Indonesia and Suriname established diplomatic relations on 24 January 1976. Both had a special relationship, based upon shared common history as former colonies of the Dutch Empire. Large numbers of Javanese migrated to Suriname to work on plantations during the late 19th and early 20th-centuries. Indonesia has an embassy in Paramaribo also accredited to the Co-operative Republic of Guyana, while Suriname has an embassy in Jakarta. Indonesia and Suriname are members of the World Trade Organization (WTO) and Forum of East Asia-Latin America Cooperation.

== History ==
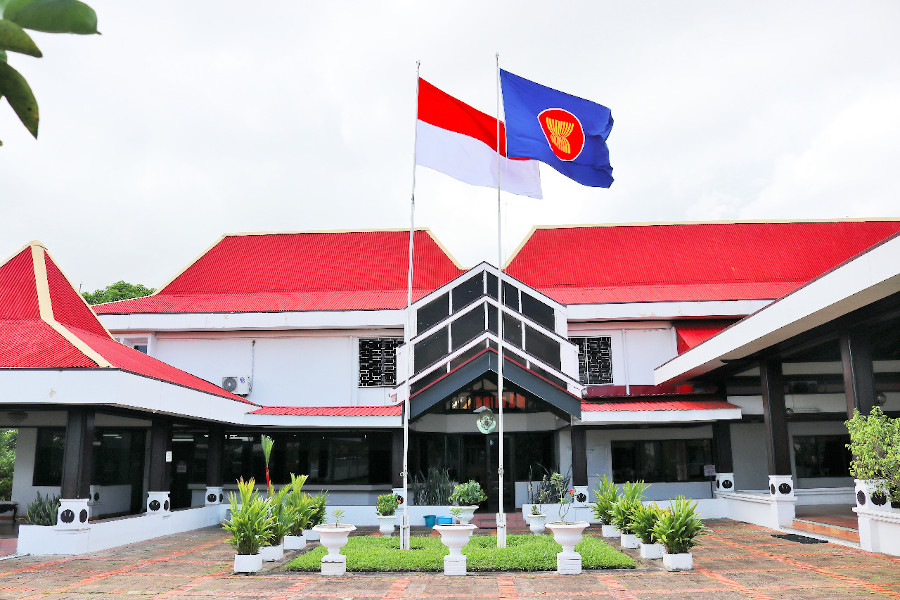
Indonesian embassy in Paramaribo

The historical links between Indonesia and Suriname dating back to the migration of Indonesians (especially Javanese) to Suriname in 1890. During colonial Dutch East Indies in 19th-century, to fulfill labor need in its other colonies, the Dutch began to send large numbers of Javanese to work in Suriname. Most of them works in plantation and agriculture sectors. In the early 2010s, around 70,000 citizens, or 15 percent of Suriname's demographic, were of Javanese descent. Some of its officials, such as cabinet ministers, had Javanese ancestry. Bilateral diplomatic relations were officially established in 1975, although there had been an Indonesian Consulate General in Paramaribo since 1964.

== Economy and trade ==
The volume of bilateral trade in 2024 was US$5.6 million in favor to Indonesia. In 2024 Indonesia's exports to Suriname were $5.4 million while imports were $0.2 million, resulting in $5.2 million surplus in trade balances for Indonesia. Indonesia sells food, pharmaceutical products, vehicles, paper and soap to Suriname. In the five years leading up to 2024, the trend was mostly downward.

== Culture ==
Indonesian's Yogyakarta and Suriname's Commewijne, signed sister cities agreement on 4 April 2011. The common Javanese culture among Javanese Indonesian and Javanese Surinamese also bridges the common cultural and historical links between two countries.

== See also ==
- Netherlands Antilles
- Javanese Surinamese
- Afro-Surinamese people
- Dutch-based creole language
- Netherlands-Suriname relations
- Surinamese people in the Netherlands
