= Lidanus =

Italian Roman Catholic saint

Saint Lidanus
- Born: 1026; Antinum, Italy
- Died: 1118 (aged 91–92); Monte Cassino, Italy
- Venerated in: Roman Catholic Church
- Canonized: Pre-Congregation
- Feast: 2 July
- Patronage: Sezze, Italy

Lidanus was a Benedictine abbot credited with draining the Pontine Marshes, Italy, and for founding Sezze Abbey in the Papal States. He died at Monte Cassino, in 1118 of natural causes.
