= Unwan =

German archbishop

Unwan (or Unwin) (died 27 January 1029 in Bremen) was the Archbishop of Hamburg-Bremen from 1013 until his death.

Unwan was granted his see on the agreement that his inheritance would go to the diocese on his death. Throughout his tenure, he was in conflict with the equally ambitious Bernard II, Duke of Saxony, as was his successor, Adalbert. In 1020, however, he allied with Empress Cunigunda to persuade the Emperor Henry II to reconcile with Bernard. Around 1019, Canute the Great, Conrad II, and Unwan arranged a peace in the north of Germany and a pact against the Slavs.

Unwan and Benno, Bishop of Oldenburg, began anew the Christianisation of the Obodrites of Wagria following decades of mild rebellion. The work of the archbishop was largely successful, save for the violent uprising precipitated by Benno's ecclesiastical land claims. In 1021, the Obodrites accepted the overlordship of the archdiocese as opposed to the Duke of Saxony and agreed to pay tithes. Adam of Bremen records that Unwan was the first German bishop to abolish the practice of observing the rules of both monasticism and canonry.

== Sources ==
- Reuter, Timothy. Germany in the Early Middle Ages 800–1056. New York: Longman, 1991.
- Thompson, James Westfall. Feudal Germany, Volume II. New York: Frederick Ungar Publishing Co., 1928.

Unwan House of Immeding Born: unknown Died: 27 January 1029 in Bremen
Catholic Church titles
Preceded by Libentius I	Archbishop of Bremen (Hamburg); 1013–1029	Succeeded by Libentius II
