= Island Arc (journal) =

- Discipline: Geology
- Language: English

Publication details
- History: 1992–present
- Publisher: Wiley-Blackwell
- Frequency: Quarterly

Standard abbreviations
- ISO 4: Isl. Arc

Indexing
- ISSN: 1038-4871

Links
- Journal homepage

Island Arc is a peer-reviewed quarterly scientific journal established in 1992, covering "Earth Sciences of Convergent Plate Margins and Related Topics". It is published by Wiley-Blackwell on behalf of the Geological Society of Japan, in association with the Japan Association for Quaternary Research, Japan Association of Mineralogical Sciences, Palaeontological Society of Japan and the Society of Resource Geology.

== Abstracting and indexing ==
The journal is abstracted and indexed in EBSCO databases, Aquatic Sciences and Fisheries Abstracts, Cambridge Scientific Abstracts, Chemical Abstracts Service, Current Contents/Physical, Chemical & Earth Sciences, InfoTrac, ProQuest, Science Citation Index, Scopus, and The Zoological Record. According to the Journal Citation Reports, the journal's 2009 impact factor is 1.182, ranking it 82nd out of 153 in the category "Geosciences, Multidisciplinary".

== See also ==
- Island arc, the geographical and geological feature that the journal takes its name from.
