= Al-Humaydi =

al-Humaydi is a surname. Notable people with the surname include:

- Abdallah ibn al-Zubayr al-Humaydi (died 834), Shafi'i jurist
- Al-Azdi al-Humaydi (1029–1095), Andalusi historian
- Saʿd al-Din al-Humaidi (fl. 1240s), Ayyubid governor of Baalbek (1246)
