= Danling County =

Danling County 丹棱县
- County
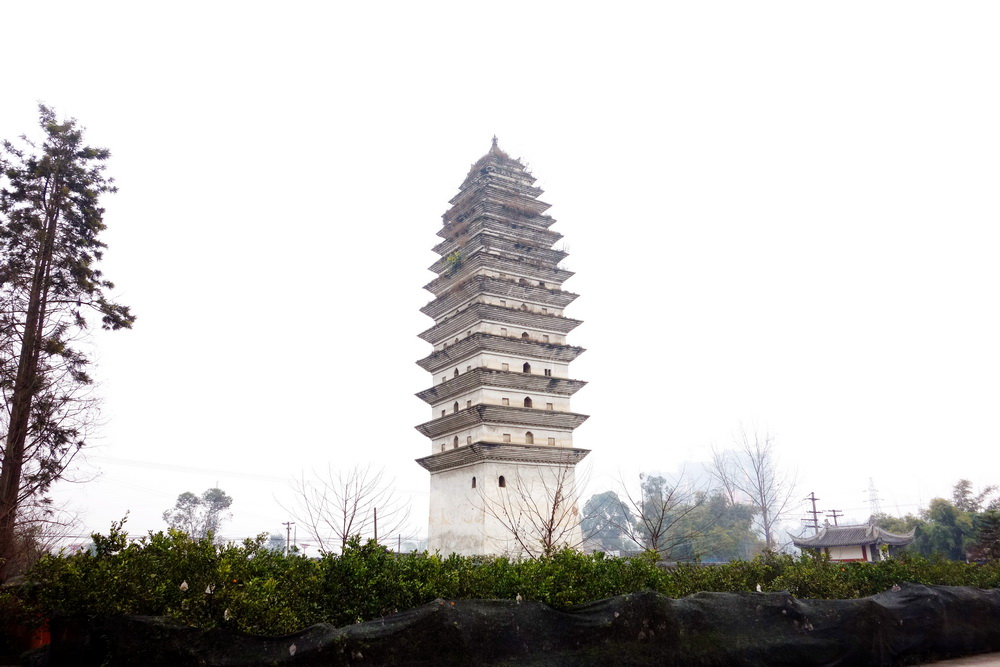

- Location in Sichuan Danling (China)
- Coordinates: 30°01′N 103°31′E
- Country: China
- Province: Sichuan
- Prefecture-level city: Meishan
- County seat: Qile (齐乐镇)

Area
  - Total: 449 km^{2} (173 sq mi)
- Elevation: 489 m (1,604 ft)

Population (2020)
  - Total: 148,820
  - Density: 331/km^{2} (858/sq mi)
- Time zone: UTC+8 (China Standard)
- Website: http://www.scdl.gov.cn/

Danling County (Chinese: 丹棱县; pinyin: Dānlíng Xiàn) is a county of central Sichuan Province, China. It is under the administration of Meishan City, with the seat located 33 kilometres (21 mi) west of downtown Meishan and 48 km (30 mi) east of Ya'an. Danling, originally known as Qile Prefecture, was named after the gliding bird-shaped red edge of the Chiya Mountain (赤崖山) in the north of the Prefecture.

== Administrative divisions ==
Danling County comprises 4 towns and 1 township:

towns

- Renmei 仁美镇
- Yangchang 杨场镇
- Zhangchang 张场镇
- Qile 齐乐镇

township

- Shunlong 顺龙乡

== Climate ==
Climate data for Danling, elevation 496 m (1,627 ft), (1991–2020 normals, extremes 1981–present)
Month	Jan	Feb	Mar	Apr	May	Jun	Jul	Aug	Sep	Oct	Nov	Dec	Year
Record high °C (°F)	20.4 (68.7)	23.8 (74.8)	32.1 (89.8)	33.0 (91.4)	35.1 (95.2)	37.5 (99.5)	38.0 (100.4)	39.0 (102.2)	35.2 (95.4)	29.6 (85.3)	26.1 (79.0)	19.1 (66.4)	39.0 (102.2)
Mean daily maximum °C (°F)	9.3 (48.7)	12.4 (54.3)	16.9 (62.4)	22.8 (73.0)	26.7 (80.1)	28.8 (83.8)	30.6 (87.1)	30.2 (86.4)	26.2 (79.2)	20.9 (69.6)	16.5 (61.7)	10.9 (51.6)	21.0 (69.8)
Daily mean °C (°F)	6.1 (43.0)	8.8 (47.8)	12.4 (54.3)	17.8 (64.0)	21.7 (71.1)	24.1 (75.4)	26.0 (78.8)	25.5 (77.9)	22.1 (71.8)	17.5 (63.5)	13.1 (55.6)	7.9 (46.2)	16.9 (62.5)
Mean daily minimum °C (°F)	3.9 (39.0)	6.2 (43.2)	9.2 (48.6)	14.0 (57.2)	17.9 (64.2)	20.7 (69.3)	22.6 (72.7)	22.1 (71.8)	19.5 (67.1)	15.4 (59.7)	10.8 (51.4)	5.7 (42.3)	14.0 (57.2)
Record low °C (°F)	−3.4 (25.9)	−2.0 (28.4)	0.2 (32.4)	5.5 (41.9)	8.7 (47.7)	14.0 (57.2)	16.7 (62.1)	15.9 (60.6)	12.8 (55.0)	5.0 (41.0)	1.6 (34.9)	−3.7 (25.3)	−3.7 (25.3)
Average precipitation mm (inches)	13.6 (0.54)	18.8 (0.74)	34.4 (1.35)	63.8 (2.51)	94.4 (3.72)	126.4 (4.98)	252.1 (9.93)	275.1 (10.83)	119.6 (4.71)	57.0 (2.24)	24.6 (0.97)	10.9 (0.43)	1,090.7 (42.95)
Average precipitation days (≥ 0.1 mm)	10.9	10.5	13.5	13.5	15.8	16.5	16.3	16.5	16.0	16.4	10.0	9.1	165
Average snowy days	1.2	0.5	0	0	0	0	0	0	0	0	0	0.3	2
Average relative humidity (%)	84	81	77	75	73	78	81	82	83	84	82	83	80
Mean monthly sunshine hours	32.9	45.9	78.6	105.3	112.7	105.3	111.9	125.8	68.9	43.9	49.8	35.8	916.8
Percentage possible sunshine	10	15	21	27	27	25	26	31	19	13	16	11	20
Source: China Meteorological Administrationall-time extreme temperatureall-time January highall-time July high
