= Liu Wenzhi =

Liu Wenzhi (Chinese: 劉文質; 964–1028), courtesy name Shibin (士彬), was a government official of the Chinese Northern Song dynasty.

== Biography ==
- Gong feng guan (Chinese: 供奉官)
- Dai Zhou zhi mou zhou jun zhou shi (Chinese: 代州知某州軍州事)
- Qing Zhou zhi mou zhou jun zhou shi (Chinese: 慶州知某州軍州事)
- Bin Zhou zhi mou zhou jun zhou shi (Chinese: 邠州知某州軍州事)
- Jing Zhou zhi mou zhou jun zhou shi (Chinese: 涇州知某州軍州事)
- Nei yuan shi (Chinese: 內園使)
- Xi jing zuo cang ku shi (Chinese: 西京左藏庫使)
- Zuo cang ku fu shi (Chinese: 左藏庫副使)
- Lin Zhou bing ma qian xia (Chinese: 麟州兵馬鈐轄)
- Kelan Jun jun shi (Chinese: 岢嵐軍軍使)
- Zhou bing ma qian xia (Chinese: 州兵馬鈐轄)
- Liangzhe Lu zhuan yun shi (Chinese: 兩浙路轉運使)

== Family ==
- father-in-law: Li Pu (Chinese: 李溥)
- father: Liu Shenqi (Chinese: 劉審奇)
- brother: Liu Wenyu (Chinese: 劉文裕)
- brother: Liu Wenyuan (Chinese: 劉文遠)
- son: Liu Huan (Chinese: 劉渙)
- son: Liu Hu (Chinese: 劉滬)
- son: Liu Chun (Chinese: 劉淳)
- son: Liu Chen (Chinese: 劉諶)
- son: Liu Wei (Chinese: 劉渭)
