= Fasanjus family =

Persian Noble Family

The Fasanjus family (also spelled Fasanjas), was the name of a Persian noble-family which served the Buyid dynasty. The first member of the family was Abu'l-Fadl al-Abbas ibn Fasanjas, a rich nobleman native to Shiraz, who was in the service of the two Buyid brothers Imad al-Dawla and Mu'izz al-Dawla. He later died in 953 at the age 77.

== Sources ==
- Cahen, Cl. (1965). "Fasandjus". In Lewis, B.; Pellat, Ch. & Schacht, J. (eds.). The Encyclopaedia of Islam, Second Edition. Volume II: C–G. Leiden: E. J. Brill. p. 827. OCLC 495469475.
- Kennedy, Hugh (2004). The Prophet and the Age of the Caliphates: The Islamic Near East from the 6th to the 11th Century (Second ed.). Harlow: Longman. ISBN 978-0-582-40525-7.
- Pomerantz, Maurice A. (2016). "Fasānjus, Banū". In Fleet, Kate; Krämer, Gudrun; Matringe, Denis; Nawas, John; Rowson, Everett (eds.). Encyclopaedia of Islam (3rd ed.). Brill Online. ISSN 1873-9830.
