= Li Tao (historian) =

Southern Song Dynasty historian

- Born: 1115; Danleng, Mei Prefecture, Song dynasty
- Died: 1184 (aged 68–69); Lin'an Prefecture, Song dynasty
- Language: Classical Chinese
- Spouse: Lady Yang (楊氏)
- Children: Li Hou (李垕) (son); Li Shu (李塾) (son); Li Xi (李𡉙) (son); Li Bi (李壁) (son); Li Zhi (李𡌴) (son); Li Jian (李堅) (son); Wife of Xue Chunying (薛純穎); Wife of Fan Zigeng (范子庚); Wife of Shi Zuqing (師祖慶)
- Relatives: Li Zhong (李中) (father); Lady Shi (史氏) (mother); Li Xi (李熹) (brother)

Chinese name
- Traditional Chinese: 李燾
- Simplified Chinese: 李焘
Transcriptions
Standard Mandarin
- Hanyu Pinyin: Lǐ Tāo
- Wade–Giles: Li T'ao

Li Renfu
- Chinese: 李仁甫 or 李仁父
Transcriptions
Standard Mandarin
- Hanyu Pinyin: Lǐ Rénfù
- Wade–Giles: Li Jen-fu

Li Zizhen
- Chinese: 李子真
Transcriptions
Standard Mandarin
- Hanyu Pinyin: Lǐ Zǐzhēn
- Wade–Giles: Li Tzu-chen

Xunyan (art name)
- Traditional Chinese: 巽巖
- Simplified Chinese: 巽岩
Transcriptions
Standard Mandarin
- Hanyu Pinyin: Xùnyán

Li Tao (1115–1184), courtesy name Renfu or Zizhen, art name Xunyan, was a Song dynasty historian and scholar-official who devoted four decades of his life compiling Xu Zizhi Tongjian Changbian, a monumental reference book chronicling the history of the Northern Song (960–1127).

== Early life ==
Li Tao was a direct descendant of Li Si (李偲), Emperor Taizong of Tang's grandson who narrowly escaped from the persecution of Empress Wu Zetian to settle in Danleng, Mei Prefecture, in 8th-century Tang dynasty. Li Tao's father Li Zhong (李中), a 15th-generation descendant of Li Si, passed the imperial examination in 1109 during the Song dynasty. He was well known for his knowledge in history and the classics.

Li Tao read widely from a young age, not only Confucian classics but also history, medicine, agriculture, cosmology and divination. A believer of I Ching, he made an effort to modify his daily conduct and learning to its teachings. But his greatest passion was in the field of history: he devoted himself to the learning of The Spring and Autumn Annals, looked up to Sima Guang and strongly believed that history should be written as a guide for Confucian ethics. In 1132 he scored first in the local examination in Mei Prefecture, and six years later he passed the imperial examination. In between, he wrote two historical essays "The Mirror of Both Han Dynasties" (兩漢鑑) and "The Discussion about the Restoration of Righteousness" (反正議), focusing on the morality lessons of his historical subjects.

== Official career ==
=== Under Emperor Gaozong ===
Having passed the imperial examination in 1138, he was appointed Assistant Magistrate (主簿) of Huayang (華陽; in modern Chengdu) in Chengdu Prefecture, but he with permission postponed the appointment to pursue further studies at home, assuming office only in 1142. When chief councilor Qin Hui heard of Li's literary fame, he offered Li a position in the central government, but Li rejected the offer on the grounds that their views differ. This directly prevented him from entering the central bureaucracy for the next 20 years.

At the local post, Li Tao spent his time collecting and arranging historical sources. He went home to mourn his late father in 1147 and became the Prefectural Judge (推官) of Ya Prefecture three years later. This was when he started working on Xu Zizhi Tongjian Changbian, an annalistic work intended to follow Sima Guang's monumental Zizhi Tongjian. Like Sima Guang before him, he began gathering the veritable records (實錄), the reign histories (國史) and biographies for his project. In 1159, when he worked under the Sichuan Military Commissioner (四川制置使) Wang Gangzhong (王剛中), he published an article titled "Ten Comments on Li Yue and Others" (李悅等十事) which denounced Qin Hui and Cai Jing. A year after he was appointed Prefect (知州) of Rong Prefecture.

=== Under Emperor Xiaozong ===
In 1163, Li Tao finished the first 17 chapters of Xu Zizhi Tongjian Changbian, which covers the reign of Emperor Taizu of Song. In 1167 he was recommended by the new Sichuan Military Commissioner Wang Yingchen (汪應辰) and went to the capital Lin'an Prefecture to serve as Assistant Official (員外郎) in the Ministry of War (兵部). He was concurrently appointed Official of the Bureau of Compilator of the Reign History (國史院編修官), and his unfinished Xu Zizhi Tongjian Changbian was included in the Palace Library. In 1168, he presented his unfinished book, now covering Song history from 960 to 1067 in roughly 108 chapters, to Emperor Xiaozong of Song. In 1169 he became Vice Director of the Palace Library (秘書少監) and concurrently an Imperial Diarist (起居舍人). He proposed to recompile the veritable records for Emperor Huizong of Song because of their "partiality and carelessness". In 1170, he was made the Examining Editor (檢討官) of the newly established Bureau of Compilation of Veritable Records (實錄院).

When Wang Yingchen suffered a political setback, Li Tao as his protégé was ousted from the central government. He served as Vice Fiscal Commissioner (轉運副使) of Jinghu North Circuit and concurrently Fiscal Governor-General of Jinghu and Guangnan Circuits. Before long he was summoned back to Lin'an and restored to his ranks and titles. Later, chief councilor Yu Yunwen feared Li's opposition to his plans to attack the Jin dynasty, so he made Li the Military Intendant of Tongchuan (潼川; in modern Sichuan) and the Administrator of Lu Prefecture (in modern Sichuan). Thereafter Li Tao served as Vice Fiscal Commissioner of Jiangnan West Circuit. By 1174 he had finished 280 chapters of Xu Zizhi Tongjian Changbian.

Li Tao came back to the central government for the third time in 1176, when he assumed the posts of Director of the Palace Library, Provisional Associate Compiler of the Bureau of Compilation of Reign History (國史院) and Associate Compiler of Bureau of Compilation of Veritable Records. In 1177 he finished the last part of Xu Zizhi Tongjian Changbian and was honored as a Vice Minister (侍郎) of the Ministry of Rites. He was also joined in the Palace Library and the historical bureaus by his son Li Hou (李垕), who worked with him in the compilation of historical materials. But when Li Hou was impeached for an allegedly blasphemous exam question which he used on university students, Li Tao was also demoted to Administrator of Changde Prefecture. In 1181 he was transferred to Administrator of Suining Prefecture.

In 1180, the Bureau of Compilation of Reign History finished the treatise chapters of its Sichao Guozhi (四朝國志; "The Reign History of Four Thrones"), with Li Tao authoring the chapters on geography. Much information of the other chapters was taken from Xu Zizhi Tongjian Changbian, and Li Tao continued to write the biography chapters. He also edited Xu Zizhi Tongjian Changbian into a 980-chapter book, and wrote the summary (68 chapters), the general catalogue (5 chapters) and the compilation accounts (10 chapters). The finished book was finally presented to Emperor Xiaozong in 1183.

He was summoned back to the central government the 4th time and rewarded the posts of Auxiliar-Academician (直學士) of Fuwen Pavilion (敷文閣), Lecturer-in-Waiting (侍講) of Hanlin Academy and Intendant of Youshen Temple (佑神觀). He continued to contribute to Sichao Guozhi until his death in 1184 in Lin'an. (The book was finished by Hong Mai in 1186.) His sons Li Hou and Li Zhi (李𡌴) were also notable historians, and another son Li Bi (李壁) became Assistant Executive of the Secretariat-Chancellery during Emperor Ningzong's reign.

== Bibliography ==
- Xu Zizhi Tongjian Changbian, a history book on the Northern Song dynasty
- Liuchao Tongjian Boyi (六朝通鑑博議), a history book on the Six Dynasties period
