= Xu Zizhi Tongjian Changbian =

Chinese history book (published 1183)

- Author: Li Tao
- Language: Classical Chinese
- Subject: History of the Song dynasty
- Published: 1183
- Publication place: Song dynasty

Xu Zizhi Tongjian Changbian
- Traditional Chinese: 續資治通鑑長編
- Simplified Chinese: 续资治通鉴长编
Transcriptions
Standard Mandarin
- Hanyu Pinyin: Xù Zīzhì Tōngjiàn Chángbiān
- Wade–Giles: Hsü Tzu-chih T'ung-chien Ch'ang-pien

The Xu Zizhi Tongjian Changbian ("Extended Continuation to Zizhi Tongjian") is an 1183 Chinese history book by Li Tao which chronicles the history of Northern Song Dynasty (960–1127). The book took Li Tao about 40 years to complete and was finally published in 1183 with 980 chapters (excluding 68 chapters of summary, 5 chapters of general catalogue, and 10 chapters of compilation accounts). However, only 520 chapters are extant. As the sequel to Sima Guang's landmark work Zizhi Tongjian ("Comprehensive Mirror to Aid in Government"), it follows the same format, but is not as concise and refined.
