= 1080s =

Decade

The 1080s was a decade of the Julian Calendar which began on January 1, 1080, and ended on December 31, 1089.

== Events ==
=== 1080 ===
==== By place ====
====== Byzantine Empire ======
- Autumn – Nikephoros Melissenos, a Byzantine general and aristocrat, seizes control of what remains of Byzantine Asia Minor (modern Turkey), and proclaims himself emperor against Nikephoros III Botaneiates. Melissenos makes an alliance with Sultan Suleiman ibn Qutulmish and recruits many Turkish mercenaries to his army.

====== Europe ======
- January 27 – Battle of Flarchheim: Henry IV, Holy Roman Emperor, defeats the forces led by the German anti-king Rudolf of Rheinfelden, duke of Swabia, near the town of Flarchheim (modern Germany).
- April 17 – King Harald III of Denmark dies after a 4-year reign and is buried at Dalby Church in Scania (modern Sweden). He is succeeded by his brother Canute IV ("the Holy") as ruler of Denmark.
- October 14 – Battle on the Elster: Rudolf of Rheinfelden defeats the imperial forces led by Henry IV at the Elster River. Rudolf dies the following day at Merseburg of wounds received.

====== Britain ======
- May 14 – Walcher, bishop of Durham, is killed by rebel Northumbrians. King William the Conqueror sends a punitive expedition led by his half-brother Odo of Bayeux to pacify Northumbria.
- Autumn – Robert Curthose, a son of William I, is sent to invade Scotland. He reaches as far as Falkirk and forces King Malcolm III to agree to terms while building fortifications at Newcastle upon Tyne.
- Osmund, bishop of Salisbury, builds Devizes Castle in Wiltshire.

====== Armenia ======
- The Rubenid Principality of Cilicia gains independence after its founder, Ruben I, succeeds in establishing his authority in the mountainous regions of Cilicia.

====== Africa ======
- The Almoravid emir, Yusuf ibn Tashfin, conquers Tangier, Badis and Hunayn.

====== China ======
- Shen Kuo, Chinese polymath scientist and statesman, begins his defensive military campaign against the Tangut people of the Western Xia. He successfully defends the invasion route to Yanzhou (Shaanxi province).

==== By topic ====
====== Religion ======
- June 25 – Wibert of Ravenna is elected as Antipope Clement III during the pro-imperial Synod of Brixen. Pope Gregory VII is deposed, signed in a decree by Henry IV.
- King Alfonso VI ("the Brave") of León and Castile establishes Latin liturgy in the Catholic Church, in place of the Hispanic Rite.
- Benno II, bishop of Osnabrück, founds the Benedictine abby of Iburg Castle (modern Germany).

=== 1081 ===
==== By place ====
====== Byzantine Empire ======
- April 1 – Emperor Nikephoros III is forced to abdicate the throne, and retires to the Peribleptos monastery. He is succeeded by Alexios I Komnenos, who is crowned on April 5, as ruler of the Byzantine Empire. His brother-in-law Nikephoros Melissenos supports Alexios as new emperor, in exchange for the title of Caesar (co-emperor), and is appointed as commander of the Byzantine armies in the West.
- May – A Norman fleet of 150 ships (including 60 horse transports), led by Duke Robert Guiscard, sets off towards the Dalmatian coast. An army of 15,000 men (including about 1,300 Norman knights) sails to the city of Avalona (modern Albania); they are joined by several ships from Ragusa, a republic in the Balkans who are enemies of the Byzantines.
- October 18 – Battle of Dyrrhachium: After taking the island of Corfu, Robert Guiscard advances to Dyrrhachium (modern-day Durrës), and lays siege to the city. Alexios I Komnenos attempts to defend Illyria from the Normans (the first recorded mention of Albania), but is defeated by Guiscard, outside Dyrrhachium, the Byzantine capital city of Illyria.

====== Europe ======
- King Alfonso VI ("the Brave") of Castile exiles his most famous commander, El Cid, who goes into exile and offers his services to the twins – Counts Ramon Berenguer II and Berenguer Ramon II of Barcelona, but is turned down. He ends up in the service of Emir Yusuf al-Mu'taman ibn Hud of Zaragoza.
- King Mihailo ("King of the Slavs") dies after a 30-year reign. He is succeeded by his son, Constantine Bodin as ruler of Duklja (until 1101).

====== Britain ======
- Battle of Mynydd Carn (near St Davids in Wales): Gruffudd ap Cynan in alliance with Rhys ap Tewdwr, prince of Deheubarth, defeats the forces of Trahaearn ap Caradog, Caradog ap Gruffydd and Meilir ap Rhiwallon (who are all killed), allowing Gruffudd to claim the Kingdom of Gwynedd.
- King William the Conqueror of England orders the creation of a castle at Cardiff during his tour of southern Wales. The first castle on the site would be a motte and bailey type and is built on existing Roman fortifications.

====== Seljuk Empire ======
- Seljuk emir Tzachas (or Chaka Bey) conquers Smyrna (modern-day İzmir) and founds a short-lived independent state, which emerges as the first sea power in Turkish history.

==== By topic ====
====== Religion ======
- Pope Gregory VII writes a letter to Hermann, bishop of Metz, about the behavior of Henry IV, Holy Roman Emperor (approximate date).
- Construction begins on St. Canute's Cathedral in Odense (modern Denmark).

=== 1082 ===
==== By place ====
====== Byzantine Empire ======
- Spring – The Normans under Duke Robert Guiscard take Dyrrhachium (modern-day Durrës) in Illyria and advance inland, capturing most of Macedonia and Thessaly. Robert is forced to leave Greece to deal with an uprising in Italy. He leaves his son Bohemond in charge of the army, who lays siege to the city of Larissa. Emperor Alexios I Komnenos mobilizes a new army, and with the support of 7,000 Seljuk Turks he clears Thessaly from the Normans.
- Byzantine–Venetian treaty: Alexios I signs a trade and defence pact with Venice, in the form of an imperial Golden Bull. He grants the Venetians a commercial colony in Constantinople, as well as free trading and exemption from taxes, throughout the Byzantine Empire in return for their defense of the Adriatic Sea against the Normans.

====== Europe ======
- May 12 – Battle of Mailberg: Duke Vratislaus II of Bohemia invades Austria with an army of 8,000 men (supported by mercenaries from Moravia and Bavaria). He defeats the forces under Margrave Leopold II ("the Fair") near Mailberg. The northern region of Lower Austria is devastated from pillage and famine.
- December 6 – Count Ramon Berenguer II of Barcelona is killed while hunting in the woods. He is succeeded by his twin brother Berenguer Ramon II as the sole ruler of Catalonia (modern Spain).
- Winter – Henry IV, Holy Roman Emperor, leads an expedition into Italy and besieges Rome. He gains entry and a synod is agreed upon by the Romans to rule on the dispute between Henry and Pope Gregory VII.
- Adalbero, margrave of Styria, is forced to resign in favor of his brother Ottokar II, who is an ally of Gregory VII.
- The first mention of the town of Hofgeismar (modern Germany) is recorded.

====== Asia ======
- Approximate date – The Korean printing of the entire Buddhist Tripiṭaka is completed.

==== By topic ====
====== Religion ======
- Construction of the Rochester Cathedral is completed in England.

=== 1083 ===
==== By place ====
====== Europe ======
- January 6 – A Castilian army, under Count Gonzalo Salvadórez and his son-in-law Ramiro Garcés, Lord of Calahorra, child of the late King García Sánchez III of Pamplona, enters the surrendered bastion of Rueda, but are then treacherously set upon and killed. Gonzalo, Ramiro, and Ramiro's illegitimate half-brother Sancho Garcés are among the many nobles to lose their lives, in what will be remembered as the 'disaster' or 'treachery of Rueda'.
- Summer – Henry IV, Holy Roman Emperor besieges Pope Gregory VII in Castel Sant'Angelo at Rome.
- October – While Robert Guiscard is in Italy, emperor Alexios I Komnenos retakes territory previously lost to the Normans, including the town of Kastoria. Several Normans, including Peter Aliphas, switch sides to the Byzantines.
- Reconquista: Castilian forces under Alfonso VI reconquer Talavera de la Reina in the Taifa of Toledo (modern Spain).
- King Sancho Ramírez of Pamplona and Aragon, conquers Graus (located in the Pyrenees).
- King William the Conqueror imprisons his half-brother Odo of Bayeux for planning a military expedition to Italy.

====== Africa ======
- Ceuta falls to the Almoravids, after a five-year siege.

=== 1084 ===
==== By place ====
====== Europe ======
- March 31 – Emperor Henry IV besieges Rome and enters the city. He is crowned Holy Roman Emperor by Antipope Clement III in Rome and receives the patrician authority.
- May – Sack of Rome: Duke Robert Guiscard leads a Norman army (36,000 men) north and enters Rome; the city is sacked, and Henry IV is forced to retreat.
- Robert Guiscard returns with 150 warships in Illyria (modern Albania), and occupies Corfu and Kefalonia with the support of Ragusa and the Dalmatian city-states.
- King Halsten Stenkilsson is killed and his brother Inge the Elder is deposed in Svealand (modern Sweden). Inge is replaced by his brother-in-law Blot-Sweyn.

====== Seljuk Empire ======
- The Seljuk Turks under Sultan Malik-Shah I conquer Byzantine Antioch, held by Philaretos Brachamios, an Armenian general, who seizes power as a usurper.

====== Asia ======
- Sima Guang, Chinese chancellor and historian, with a group of scholars, completes the Zizhi Tongjian, a chronicle of universal history of China.
- April 21 – King Kyansittha begins his reign as ruler of the Pagan Kingdom in Burma (modern Myanmar).

==== By topic ====
====== Religion ======
- Pope Gregory VII, who has been forced by the presence in Rome of Henry IV to retreat to the Castel Sant'Angelo, is freed by Robert Guiscard and restores papal authority in Rome.
- Bruno of Cologne founds the Carthusian Order which includes both monks and nuns. He builds a hermitage in the French Alps.
- Building work starts on Worcester Cathedral in England, orchestrated by Bishop Wulfstan.

=== 1085 ===
==== By place ====
====== Europe ======
- May 25 – King Alfonso VI of León and Castile ("the Brave") recaptures Toledo from the Moors, and occupies other cities such as Madrid and Talavera (including the castle of Aledo). Alfonso moves his capital to Toledo, and consolidates his power between Sistema Central and the Tagus River, from where he launches more attacks against the taifas of Córdoba, Seville, Badajoz and Granada (modern Spain).
- Summer – Robert Guiscard heads for the Ionian Islands despite an epidemic among troops on Corfu. His son, Roger Borsa, lands on Cephalonia but Guiscard falls sick as his ship approaches the northernmost headland and is carried ashore, where he dies of fever (on July 17).
- Emperor Henry IV declares the Peace of God in all the imperial territories of the Holy Roman Empire to quell any sedition.
- June 15 – Vratislaus II, a son of Duke Bretislav I, becomes the first king of Bohemia and is elevated 'for life' by Henry IV.
- Katedralskolan in Lund (modern Sweden), the oldest school in Scandinavia, is founded by King Canute IV of Denmark.

====== England ======
- The Domesday Survey is commissioned by King William the Conqueror, apparently prompted by the abortive invasion of Canute IV, to ensure proper taxation and levies.

====== China ======
- April 1 – Emperor Zhezong ascends the throne at the age of 8 under the supervision of his grandmother, Grand Empress Dowager Gao. She cancels the reform policy of Chancellor Wang Anshi.
- The output of copper currency for the Chinese Song dynasty reaches 6 billion coins a year, prompting the Chinese government to adopt the world's first paper-printed money later in the 1120s.

=== 1086 ===
==== By place ====
====== Europe ======
- October 23 – Battle of Sagrajas: Spanish forces under King Alfonso VI ("the Brave") of Castile are defeated by the Moors and their allies, the Almoravids, who have been invited to help on orders by Emir Al-Mu'tamid ibn Abbad.
- Siege of Syracuse (1086) – Norman forces under Count Roger I ("Bosso") conquer Syracuse, the last Muslim stronghold in Sicily.

====== England ======
- August 1 – King William the Conqueror calls for a meeting at Old Sarum, where he invites his major vassals and tenants-in-chief to swear allegiance to him. This is known as the Oath of Salisbury.
- The Domesday Book is completed. Drawn up on the orders of William I; it describes in detail the landholdings and resources in England.
- The population in England is estimated to be 1.25 million citizens with 10% living in boroughs.

====== Seljuk Empire ======
- Summer – Suleiman ibn Qutulmish, ruler of the Turks in Rum, is killed by Emir Tutush I in the battle of Ain Salm near Antioch. Suleiman's 7-year-old son Kilij Arslan I is captured and transferred as hostage to Isfahan (modern Iran).
- Sultan Malik-Shah I rebuilds the Imam Ali Mosque in Najaf (modern Iraq), after it was destroyed by fire.

==== By topic ====
====== Religion ======
- May 24 – Pope Victor III succeeds Gregory VII as the 158th pope of the Catholic Church, though he does not accept election until 1087.

=== 1087 ===
==== By place ====
====== Europe ======
- Summer – The Taifa of Valencia falls under the domination of El Cid. He stabilizes the region around Valencia, which has revolted against the Moorish puppet ruler Al-Qadir.
- Inge the Elder returns to Svealand and kills his brother-in-law Blot-Sweyn after a 3-year reign. Inge again proclaims himself king of Sweden (approximate date).

====== England ======
- September 9 – William the Conqueror dies in Rouen after a fall from his horse. He is succeeded as king of England by his third son William II.
- A fire in London destroys much of the city, including St. Paul's Cathedral. Bishop Maurice starts the rebuilding of a new, much larger cathedral.

====== Africa ======
- Mahdia campaign: The navies of Genoa and Pisa take the capital of the Zirids, and occupy Mahdia for a year. Subsequently, both republics obtain trading privileges.
- Completion of Bab al-Futuh, Cairo

====== Japan ======
- January 3 – Emperor Shirakawa abdicates in favor of his 7-year-old son Horikawa after a 14-year reign. He exerts his personal power to set the cloistered rule system further in motion.

====== Middle East ======
- May: The marriage of Caliph al-Muqtadi and Mah-i Mulk is consummated. This marriage strengthens the political relation of Malik-Shah I and the Caliph.

==== By topic ====
====== Religion ======
- May 9 – The relics of Saint Nicholas, patron saint of seafarers, are stolen by Italian sailors from his church in Myra (modern Turkey) and transported to Bari in southern Italy.
- September 16 – Pope Victor III dies after a 1-year pontificate at Monte Cassino. He is buried in the abbey's chapter house.

=== 1088 ===
==== By place ====
====== Europe ======
- Almoravid forces (supported with fighters from local Andalusian provinces), under Sultan Yusuf ibn Tashfin, besiege Aledo, but are forced to retreat, by the arrival of Spanish troops of King Alfonso VI ("the Brave") of Castile.
- Catalonian troops, under Count Berenguer Ramon II, reconquer Tarragona (lost again in 1108). He will rule Catalonia with his 6-year-old nephew Ramon Berenguer III, until he comes of age.

====== England ======
- Spring – A rebellion led by William the Conqueror's half-brothers Odo of Bayeux and Robert (2nd Earl of Cornwall), begins against King William II with the aim to remove him from the throne. Odo's revolt in Kent and Sussex is supported by nobles across the country.
- The Worcestershire rebellion led by Robert de Lacy (a son of Ilbert de Lacy) is dealt with quickly by Wulfstan, bishop of Worcester, who calls on those knights and local landowners still loyal to William II to defend Worcester. Many of the rebels are captured or killed.
- William II calls the representatives of the fyrd to a meeting in London. He promises (with the support of Lanfranc, bishop of Canterbury) the people better laws, and the removal of taxes if they support him against the rebels.
- William II lays siege to Pevensey Castle on the south coast where Odo of Bayeux has taken shelter with Robert. Odo is forced to surrender, and agrees to go to Rochester to convince the rebels to accept William as the rightful king of England.
- Summer – William II lays siege to Rochester Castle and puts down the revolt. Odo of Bayeux and the rebels surrender (agreeing only that their lives will be spared). William takes Odo's lands and exiles him to Normandy.

====== Africa ======
- Nasir ibn Alnas, ruler of the Hammadids, dies after a 26-year reign. He is succeeded by his son Al-Mansur ibn al-Nasir (until 1104).

==== By topic ====
====== Arts and Culture ======
- The Dream Pool Essays is published by the Chinese polymath scientist and statesman Shen Kuo. His book represents the earliest known writing about the magnetic compass, movable type printing, experimentation with the camera obscura only decades after Hasan ibn al-Haytham, which includes many different fields of study in essay and encyclopedic form, including geology, astronomy, archaeology, mathematics, pharmacology, magnetism, geography, optics, hydraulics, economics, military strategy, philosophy, etc. Some of Shen's most advanced theories include geomorphology and climate variability, while he improves Chinese astronomy, by fixing the position of the pole star and correcting the lunar error, by plotting its orbital course every night for a continuum of five years. Shen's book is also the first to describe the drydock in China – and discusses the advantages of the recent invention of the canal pound lock, over the old flash lock.
- Su Song, Chinese polymath scientist and statesman, invents the pilot model for his astronomical clock tower constructed in Kaifeng. It features an escapement mechanism – and the world's oldest known power-transmitting chain drive to operate the armillary sphere, opening doors, and mechanical-driven mannequins, that would rotate in shifts to announce the time on plaques.

====== Education ======
- The oldest extant university, the University of Bologna, is founded in Italy (approximate date).

====== Geology ======
- April 16 – The 6.5 M_{s} Tmogvi earthquake affects the southern provinces of Georgia, which causes the destruction of the castle of Tmogvi and many deaths.

====== Religion ======
- March 12 – Pope Urban II (Urbanus) succeeds Victor III as the 159th pope of the Catholic Church in Rome.

=== 1089 ===
==== By place ====
====== Europe ======
- April 20 (possible date) – Demetrius Zvonimir, king of Croatia, dies after a 12-year reign, and is succeeded by Stephen II. Zvonimir's widow, Helena of Hungary, Queen of Croatia, plots the inheritance of the Croatian crown for her brother, King Ladislaus I of Hungary.
- June 24 – Reconquista: Gaston IV, Viscount of Béarn (supported by French crusaders) reconquers the Aragonese city of Monzón from Emir Al-Mustain II of the Taifa of Zaragoza.
- August 18 – Henry IV, Holy Roman Emperor, marries Eupraxia of Kiev (daughter of Grand Prince Vsevolod I) at Cologne. She is crowned and assumes the name Adelaide (or Adelheid).
- King George II abdicates the throne in favour of his 16-year-old son David IV ("the Builder") who becomes ruler of Georgia (until 1125).

====== England ======
- August 11 – A powerful earthquake is recorded in England.
- Northumbria is divided by King William II into the counties of Northumberland, County Palatine of Durham, Yorkshire, Westmorland and Lancashire.

==== By topic ====
====== Religion ======
- March 21 – Cîteaux Abbey, the first Cistercian monastery, is established by a group of French monks under Robert of Molesme in southern France.
- August 28 – Braga Cathedral in the County of Portugal has its reconstruction (following 353 years of Muslim occupation) completed sufficiently for its consecration to the Virgin Mary to take place.
- September
  - The Synod of Melfi, led by Pope Urban II (his first papal council), issues decrees against simony and clerical marriage.
  - A church council, held in Constantinople, discuses relations between Eastern and Western Christianity.

== Significant people ==
- Al-Muqtadi caliph of Baghdad
- Pope Gregory VII
- Malik-Shah I Seljuk sultan
- Nizam al-Mulk
- Pope Victor III
- Pope Urban II

== Births ==
1080 (many dates approximate)

- Adelard of Bath, English philosopher (d. 1152)
- Alberic of Ostia, French cardinal-bishop (d. 1148)
- Barthélemy de Jur, French bishop
- Cellach of Armagh (or Celsus), Irish archbishop (d. 1129)
- Egas Moniz o Aio, Portuguese nobleman (d. 1146)
- Eilika of Saxony, German noblewoman (d. 1142)
- Ermesinde of Luxembourg, countess of Namur (d. 1143)
- Guarinus of Palestrina, Italian cardinal-bishop (d. 1158)
- Harald Kesja ("the Spear"), king of Denmark (d. 1135)
- Helie of Burgundy, countess of Toulouse (d. 1141)
- Henry I, archbishop of Mainz
- Honorius Augustodunensis, French theologian (d. 1154)
- Ibn Tumart, Almoravid political leader
- Leo I, prince of Cilician Armenia
- Lhachen Utpala, Indian king of Ladakh (d. 1110)
- Magnus Erlendsson, Norse earl of Orkney (d. 1115)
- María Rodríguez de Vivar, countess of Barcelona (d. 1105)
- Matilda of Scotland, queen consort of England (d. 1118)
- Piotr Włostowic, Polish nobleman
- Reginald I ("the One-Eyed"), count of Bar (d. 1149)
- Richard Fitz Pons, Norman nobleman (d. 1129)
- Robert Pullen, English cardinal
- Rotrou III ("the Great"), French nobleman (d. 1144)
- Theresa, Portuguese queen and regent (d. 1130)
- Wanyan Zonghan, Chinese nobleman (d. 1136)
- Wulfric of Haselbury, English wonderworker (d. 1154)

1081

- Louis VI ("the Fat"), king of France (approximate date)
- Gruffydd ap Rhys, Welsh king of Deheubarth (d. 1137)
- Rudolf I, count of Bregenz and Chur (d. 1160)
- Satake Masayoshi, Japanese samurai (d. 1147)
- Suger, French abbot and historian (approximate date) (d. 1151)
- William I, count of Luxembourg (d. 1131)
- Zhang Bangchang, Chinese prime minister (d. 1127)
- Zhao Mingcheng, Chinese scholar-official (d. 1129)

1082

- June 7 – Huizong, emperor of the Song dynasty (d. 1135)
- November 11 – Ramon Berenguer III, count of Barcelona (d. 1132)
- Goswin of Anchin, French Benedictine monk and abbot (d. 1165)
- Mary of Scotland, countess of Boulogne (d. 1116)
- Minamoto no Yoshikuni, Japanese samurai (d. 1155)
- Muhammad I Tapar, sultan of the Seljuk Empire (d. 1118)
- Yaropolk II Vladimirovich, Grand Prince of Kiev (d. 1139)
- Approximate date
  - Petronilla of Lorraine, countess and regent of Holland (d. 1144)
  - Theotonius of Coimbra, Portuguese royal advisor (d. 1162)
  - Ulrich of Attems, Italian nobleman

1083

- December 1 – Anna Komnene, Byzantine princess (d. 1153)
- Florine of Burgundy, French noblewoman and crusader (d. 1097)
- Li Gang, Chinese politician and Grand Chancellor (d. 1140)
- Qadi Iyad, Almoravid imam and chief judge (qadi) (d. 1149)
- Raymond du Puy, French knight and Grand Master (d. 1160)
- Shin Panthagu, Burmese Buddhist monk and primate (d. 1174)
- Viacheslav I Vladimirovich, Grand Prince of Kiev (d. 1154)
- Approximate date
  - Jindřich Zdík (or Henry Zdík), bishop of Olomouc (d. 1150)
  - Otto IV, count palatine of Bavaria (approximate date)

1084

- August 1 – Heonjong, Korean king of Goryeo (d. 1097)
- Alan I (le Noir), viscount of Rohan (d. 1147)
- Ali ibn Yusuf, ruler of the Almoravids (d. 1143)
- Bahram-Shah, ruler of the Ghaznavids (d. 1157)
- Charles I (the Good), count of Flanders (d. 1127)
- David I, king of Scotland (approximate date)
- Li Qingzhao, Chinese female poet and writer
- Rainier, margrave of Montferrat (approximate date)
- Rechungpa, Tibetan founder of the Kagyu school (d. 1161)
- Wang, Chinese empress of the Song dynasty (d. 1108)

1085

- September 19 – Maria Komnene, Byzantine princess
- Ahmad Sanjar, Seljuk ruler of Khorasan (approximate date)
- Alberich of Reims, archbishop of Bourges (approximate date)
- Avempace, Andalusian polymath and philosopher (d. 1138)
- Constantine Komnenos, Byzantine aristocrat (approximate date)
- Elizabeth of Vermandois, English countess (approximate date)
- Floris II ("the Fat"), count of Holland (approximate date)
- Gilbert of Sempringham, English priest (approximate date)
- Imad ad-Din Zengi, Seljuk ruler of Mosul (approximate date)
- Meginhard I, count of Sponheim (approximate date)
- Otomae, Japanese female singer and musician (d. 1169)
- Otto II the Black, Moravian prince (approximate date)
- Ralph I (or Raoul), count of Vermandois (approximate date)
- Robert fitz Martin, Norman knight and nobleman (d. 1159)
- Stephen of Obazine, French priest and hermit (d. 1154)
- Waleran II, duke of Lower Lorraine (approximate date)
- William of Montevergine, Italian monk and abbot (d. 1142)
- William, Count of Sully ("the Simple"), French nobleman (approximate date)
- Zhang Zeduan, Chinese landscape painter (d. 1145)
- Zhu Bian, Chinese diplomat, poet and writer (d. 1144)

1086

- April 24 – Ramiro II ("the Monk"), king of Aragon (d. 1157)
- August 11 – Henry V, Holy Roman Emperor (d. 1125)
- August 20 – Bolesław III Wrymouth, duke of Poland (d. 1138)
- al-Shahrastani, Persian scholar and historian (d. 1153)
- Þorlákur Runólfsson, Icelandic bishop (d. 1133)
- Vicelinus, bishop of Oldenburg in Holstein (d. 1154)
- Zhang Jun, Chinese general and official (d. 1154)

1087

- September 13 – John II Komnenos, Byzantine emperor (d. 1143)
- Ibn Quzman, Andalusian poet and writer (approximate date)
- Reginald III (or Renaud), count of Burgundy (approximate date)
- Theoderich van Are (or Dietrich), German nobleman (d. 1126)

1088

- January 31 – Ja'far ibn Abdallah al-Muqtadi, son of caliph al-Muqtadi and Mah-i Mulk.
- July 24 – Ibn al-Arif, Moorish Sufi scholar and writer (d. 1141)
- November 7 – Hemachandra, Indian Jain poet and polymath (d. 1173)
- Bermudo Pérez de Traba, Spanish nobleman (d. 1168)
- Irene of Hungary, Byzantine empress consort (d. 1134)
- John IV, Byzantine prince and archbishop (approximate date)
- Lucienne de Rochefort, French crown princess (d. 1137)
- Tairrdelbach Ua Conchobair, Irish king of Connacht (d. 1156)
- William III of Mâcon (or William IV of Burgundy), French nobleman (d. 1156)
- Zhenxie Qingliao, Chinese Zen Buddhist monk (d. 1151)

1089

- Abraham ibn Ezra, Jewish rabbi and philosopher (d. 1167) (approximate date)
- Berthold of Zwiefalten, German abbot and writer (d. 1169) (approximate date)
- Dahui Zonggao, Chinese Zen Buddhist monk (d. 1163)
- Han Shizhong, Chinese general of the Northern Song dynasty (d. 1151)
- Mahsati, Persian female poet and writer (approximate date)
- Richard de Luci, Norman High Sheriff of Essex (d. 1179)
- Sigurd the Crusader, king of Norway (d. 1130)
- Wulgrin II, count of Angoulême (approximate date)

== Deaths ==
1080

- January 26 – Amadeus II, count of Savoy (b. 1050)
- April 17 – Harald III, king of Denmark (b. 1040)
- May 14 – Walcher, bishop of Durham
- July 5 – Ísleifur Gissurarson, Icelandic bishop (b. 1006)
- October 15 – Rudolf of Rheinfelden, duke of Swabia
- Abraham, bishop of St David's (Wales) (murdered: approximate date)
- Aristakes Lastivertsi, Armenian historian (b. 1002)
- Bertha of Blois, duchess of Brittany (approximate date)
- Haakon Ivarsson, Norwegian jarl (b. 1027)
- Lhachen Gyalpo, Indian king of Ladakh (b. 1050)
- Michael Attaleiates, Byzantine historian and writer
- Muhammad ibn Abbas, ruler of the Ghurid dynasty

1081

- January/February – Ibn Hayyus, Syrian poet and panegyrist (b. 1003)
- April 2/3 – Bolesław II the Bold (or "the Generous"), king of Poland (or 1082)
- June – Bernard of Menthon, French priest and saint
- September 1 – Eusebius (or Bruno), bishop of Angers
- October 18
  - Konstantios Doukas, Byzantine emperor (b. 1060)
  - Nikephoros Palaiologos, Byzantine general
- December 10 – Nikephoros III, Byzantine emperor
- December 21 – Abu al-Walid al-Baji, Moorish scholar and poet (b. 1013)
- Abelard of Hauteville, Italo-Norman nobleman
- Artau I, count of Pallars Sobirà (approximate date)
- Caradog ap Gruffydd, prince of Gwent, killed in battle
- Jōjin, Japanese Tendai monk and writer (b. 1011)
- Mihailo ("King of the Slavs"), Serbian king of Duklja
- Trahaearn ap Caradog, Welsh king of Gwynedd, killed in battle (b. 1044)

1082

- April 2/3 (or 1081) – Bolesław II the Bold, king of Poland
- December 5 – Ramon Berenguer II, count of Barcelona
- Arsen Ninotsmindeli, Georgian bishop and calligrapher
- David of Munktorp, English Cluniac monk and abbot
- Lothair Udo II, margrave of the Nordmark
- Waleran I (or Walram), count of Arlon and Limburg
- Approximate date – Robert de Grandmesnil, Norman nobleman

1083

- January 6
  - Gonzalo Salvadórez, Spanish nobleman
  - Ramiro Garcés, Spanish nobleman
  - Sancho Garcés, Spanish nobleman
- January 11 – Otto of Nordheim, duke of Bavaria
- September 2 – Munjong of Goryeo, Korean ruler (b. 1019)
- November 2 – Matilda of Flanders, queen consort of England
- December 5 – Sunjong of Goryeo, Korean ruler (b. 1047)
- Adelelm of Jumièges, Norman monk and abbot
- Basil Apokapes (or Apocapes), Byzantine general
- Ermengarde of Tonnerre, French noblewoman
- Nicodemus of Palermo, Italian bishop and saint
- Touzi Yiqing, Chinese Zen Buddhist monk (d. 1032)
- Zeng Gong, Chinese scholar and historian (b. 1019)
- Approximate date – Theodora Doukaina Selvo, Venetian dogaressa (b. 1058)

1084

- February 16 – Siegfried I, archbishop of Mainz
- June 28 – Ekkehard of Huysburg, German abbot
- October 10 – Gilla Pátraic, bishop of Dublin
- November 20 – Otto II, margrave of Montferrat
- Aghsartan I, Georgian king of Kakheti and Hereti
- Fujiwara no Kenshi, Japanese empress (b. 1057)
- Halsten Stenkilsson, king of Sweden (approximate date)
- Herfast (or Arfast), Norman Lord Chancellor
- Hoël II, duke of Brittany (House of Cornouaille)
- Saw Lu, king of the Pagan Kingdom (b. 1049)

1085

- January 3 – Williram of Ebersberg, German abbot
- April 1 – Shenzong, emperor of Song dynasty China (b. 1048)
- May 25 – Gregory VII, pope of the Catholic Church
- May 27 – Gundred, Countess of Surrey (or Gundreda), English noblewoman
- June 19 – Vitalis of Bernay, Norman monk and abbot
- July 17 – Robert Guiscard, Norman warrior and nobleman
- August 19 – Al-Juwayni, Persian scholar and imam (b. 1028)
- September 20 – Hermann II, German nobleman (b. 1049)
- Alfanus I (or Alfano), Italian physician and archbishop
- Al-Lakhmi, Fatimid scholar, jurist and writer (b. 1006)
- Cheng Hao, Chinese neo-Confucian philosopher (b. 1032)
- Maitripada, Indian Buddhist philosopher (b. 1007)
- Osbern Giffard, Norman nobleman (approximate date)
- Wang Gui, Chinese official and chancellor (b. 1019)
- Yūsuf Balasaguni, Karakhanid statesman (b. 1019)

1086

- March 15 – Richilde, countess and regent of Flanders
- March 18 – Anselm of Lucca, Italian bishop (b. 1036)
- May 21 – Wang Anshi, Chinese chancellor (b. 1021)
- July 10 – Canute IV ("the Holy"), king of Denmark
- July 14 – Toirdelbach Ua Briain, Irish king (b. 1009)
- July 17 – García Ramírez, Aragonese bishop
- August 8 – Conrad I, count of Luxembourg (b. 1040)
- September 25 – William VIII, duke of Aquitaine
- October 11 – Sima Guang, Chinese politician (b. 1019)
- October 23 – Rodrigo Muñoz, Galician nobleman
- December 25 – Judith of Bohemia, duchess of Poland
- Gregory Pakourianos, Byzantine politician and general, killed in battle
- Huizong, Chinese emperor (Western Xia) (b. 1060)
- Mael Ísu Ua Brolcháin, Irish monk and writer
- Muhammad ibn Ammar, Moorish poet (b. 1031)
- Odo I of Furneaux (or 'Eudes'), French nobleman (b. 1040)
- Suleiman ibn Qutulmish, ruler of the Sultanate of Rum, killed in battle

1087

- June 9 – Otto I ("the Fair"), prince of Olomouc (b. 1045)
- June 27 – Henry I the Long, margrave of the Nordmark
- September 9 – William the Conqueror, king of England
- September 16 – Victor III, pope of the Catholic Church
- September 25 – Simon I, French nobleman (b. 1025)
- November 12 – William I, French nobleman (b. 1020)
- December 13 – Maria Dobroniega, duchess of Poland
- December 27 – Bertha of Savoy, Holy Roman Empress (b. 1051)
- Abu Bakr ibn Umar, military leader of the Almoravids
- Abū Ishāq Ibrāhīm al-Zarqālī, Arab astrologer (b. 1029)
- Arnold of Soissons (or Arnoul), French bishop (b. 1040)
- Asma bint Shihab, queen and co-regent of Yemen
- Blot-Sweyn, king of Svealand (approximate date)
- Eustace II, count of Boulogne (approximate date)
- Leo Diogenes, Byzantine co-emperor (b. 1069)
- Solomon (or Salomon), king of Hungary (b. 1053)
- Yaropolk Izyaslavich, prince of Turov and Volhyn

1088

- January 6 – Berengar of Tours, French theologian
- April 7 – Burchard II (or Bucco), German bishop
- June 15 – Gebhard of Salzburg, German archbishop
- June 24 – William de Warenne, Norman nobleman
- July 27 – Benno II, German bishop and architect
- September 25 – Godfrey, English bishop of Chichester
- September 28 – Hermann of Salm, German nobleman
- Alberic of Monte Cassino, German Benedictine cardinal
- Berthold of Reichenau, German chronicler and writer
- Dubh Chablaigh ingen Áed, Irish queen consort of Munster
- Hugh de Montfort, Lord of Montfort-sur-Risle, Norman nobleman (approximate date)
- John Doukas, Byzantine usurper (approximate date)
- Khwaja Abdullah Ansari, Persian Sufi poet (b. 1006)
- Mael Isa ua Máilgiric, Irish Chief Ollam and writer
- Marianus Scotus of Regensburg, Irish-born abbot (approximate date)
- Nasir Khusraw, Persian poet and philosopher (b. 1004) (latest date)
- Nasir ibn Alnas, Berber ruler of the Hammadids
- Ranulf I of Caiazzo (or Rainulf), Italo-Norman nobleman
- Rhiryd ap Bleddyn, Welsh king of Powys (b. 1049)
- Tigernach Ua Braín, Irish abbot and writer

1089

- April 20 (possible date) – Demetrius Zvonimir, king of Croatia and Dalmatia
- May 24 – Lanfranc, Italian-born archbishop of Canterbury
- May 29/30 – Mah-i Mulk Khatun wife of caliph al-Muqtadi (r. 1075–1094).
- May 31 – Sigwin von Are, archbishop of Cologne
- October 6 – Adalbero, Prince-Bishop of Würzburg
- November 11 – Peter Igneus, Italian cardinal-bishop
- December 22 – William the Walloon, French abbot
- Agnes of Aquitaine, French-born countess consort of Savoy
- Donnchad mac Domnaill Remair, Irish king of Dublin, killed (approximate date)
- Durandus of Troarn, French monk and theologian
- Isaac ibn Ghiyyat, Spanish Jewish rabbi and philosopher
- Mieszko Bolesławowic, Polish prince of Kraków
- Renauld II, French count of Nevers and Auxerre
- Theobald III, Count of Blois (or Thibaut), French nobleman
