= 1012 =

Calendar year

1012 in various calendars
- Gregorian calendar: 1012; MXII
- Ab urbe condita: 1765
- Armenian calendar: 461; ԹՎ ՆԿԱ
- Assyrian calendar: 5762
- Balinese saka calendar: 933–934
- Bengali calendar: 418–419
- Berber calendar: 1962
- English Regnal year: N/A
- Buddhist calendar: 1556
- Burmese calendar: 374
- Byzantine calendar: 6520–6521
- Chinese calendar: 辛亥年 (Metal Pig); 3709 or 3502 — to — 壬子年 (Water Rat); 3710 or 3503
- Coptic calendar: 728–729
- Discordian calendar: 2178
- Ethiopian calendar: 1004–1005
- Hebrew calendar: 4772–4773
- Hindu calendars
- Vikram Samvat: 1068–1069
- Shaka Samvat: 933–934
- Kali Yuga: 4112–4113
- Holocene calendar: 11012
- Igbo calendar: 12–13
- Iranian calendar: 390–391
- Islamic calendar: 402–403
- Japanese calendar: Kankō 9 / Chōwa 1 (長和元年)
- Javanese calendar: 914–915
- Julian calendar: 1012; MXII
- Korean calendar: 3345
- Minguo calendar: 900 before ROC 民前900年
- Nanakshahi calendar: −456
- Seleucid era: 1323/1324 AG
- Thai solar calendar: 1554–1555
- Tibetan calendar: ལྕགས་མོ་ཕག་ལོ་ (female Iron-Boar); 1138 or 757 or −15 — to — ཆུ་ཕོ་བྱི་བ་ལོ་ (male Water-Rat); 1139 or 758 or −14

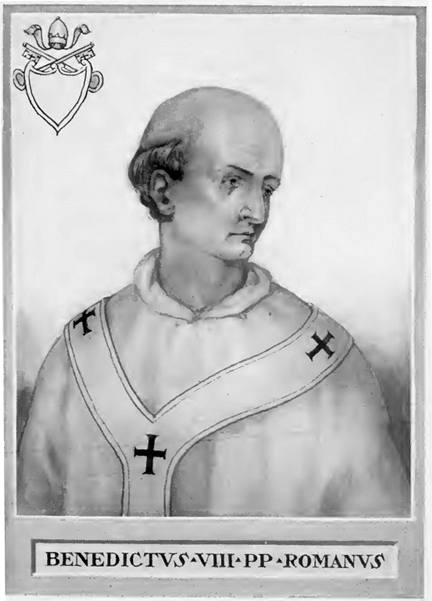
Pope Benedict VIII (c. 980–1024)

Year 1012 (MXII) was a leap year starting on Tuesday of the Julian calendar.

== Events ==
=== By place ===
==== Europe ====
- April 12 – Oldřich, Duke of Bohemia, deposes his brother Jaromír, who flees to Poland. Oldřich recognises the suzerainty of King Henry II of Germany over Bohemia. He secures his rule by suppressing the Vršovci insurgents.

==== England ====
- April – King Æthelred the Unready resumes the payment of Danegeld (48,000 pounds of silver) in an attempt to buy off Viking raiders.

==== Ireland ====
- Máel Mórda mac Murchada starts a rebellion against High King Brian Boru in Ireland, which ends in 1014 at the Battle of Clontarf.

==== Scotland ====
- King Malcolm II of Scotland reputedly defeats a Danish army at Cruden Bay.

==== Arabian Empire ====
- Summer – The climax of the Bedouin anti-Fatimid rebellion in Palestine is reached. Abu'l-Futuh al-Hasan ibn Ja'far is acclaimed as anti-Caliph with the title of al-Rashid bi-llah ("Righteous with God").

==== Mexico ====
- The Tepanec tribe settles on the western region of Lake Texcoco. The lineage starts when the Chichimeca chieftain Acolhua marries Cuetlaxochitzin, daughter of Xolotl, another Chichimeca chieftain.

==== Japan ====
- February – Fujiwara no Kenshi, daughter of the powerful court official Fujiwara no Michinaga, is elevated to Empress Consort (Chūgū). The Emperor's first wife, Fujiwara no Seishi, is also elevated to Empress (Kōgō) at the same time but Michinaga ensures that court officials do not attend her ceremony.
- August 12 – Death of Ōe no Masahira, husband of poet and former palace lady-in-waiting Akazome Emon, who writes a number of mourning poems to him.
- Fujiwara no Yorimichi, second son of Fujiwara no Michinaga, marries the daughter of Michinaga's enemy Fujiwara no Kintō, eventually reconciling the families. Another son of Michinaga, Fujiwara no Akinobu, causes scandal by becoming a priest without telling his parents, but they eventually accept his decision.

=== By topic ===
==== Religion ====
- April 19 – Ælfheah, archbishop of Canterbury in England, is murdered by his Danish captors at Greenwich (after refusing to pay a ransom of 3,000 pounds for his release).
- May 12 – Pope Sergius IV dies after a 3-year pontificate at Rome. He is succeeded by Benedict VIII as the 143rd pope of the Catholic Church.
- Approximate date – Camaldolese order established by Romuald in Tuscany.

== Births ==
- August 19 – Baldwin V, count of Flanders (d. 1067)
- Benedict IX, pope of the Catholic Church (approximate date)
- Cai Xiang, Chinese calligrapher, official and poet (d. 1067)
- Durandus of Troarn, French theologian (approximate date)
- García Sánchez III, king of Pamplona (approximate date)
- Guo, Chinese empress of the Song dynasty (d. 1035)
- Maria Dobroniega of Kiev, duchess of Poland (d. 1087)
- Marpa Lotsawa, Tibetan Buddhist teacher (d. 1097)
- Rongzom Mahapandita, Tibetan Buddhist scholar (d. 1088)
- Theobald III of Blois, French nobleman (d. 1089)

== Deaths ==
- April 1 – Herman III, duke of Swabia
- April 19 – Ælfheah, archbishop of Canterbury
- May 12 – Sergius IV, pope of the Catholic Church (b. 970)
- May 26 – Erluin II, monk and abbot of Gembloux
- June 9
  - Tagino, archbishop of Magdeburg
  - Unger, bishop of Poznań
- August 12 – Walthard, archbishop of Magdeburg
- September 12 – Ad-Da'i Yusuf, Zaidi imam and ruler
- October 18 – Coloman of Stockerau, Irish pilgrim
- December 22 – Baha' al-Dawla, Buyid emir of Iraq
- Erluin, archdeacon and bishop of Cambrai
- Gaston II Centule, viscount of Béarn
- Gundemaro Pinióliz, Spanish nobleman
- Guy of Anderlecht (or Guido), Christian saint
- Ibn Faradi, Moorish scholar and historian (b. 962)
- John II Crescentius, consul and patrician of Rome
- John Morosini (the Blessed), Venetian abbot
- Otto, duke of Lower Lorraine (approximate date)
- Qabus, Ziyarid emir of Gorgan and Tabaristan
- Roger I, count of Carcassonne (approximate date)
- Tedald of Canossa, Italian nobleman
