= 1089 =

1089 in various calendars
- Gregorian calendar: 1089; MLXXXIX
- Ab urbe condita: 1842
- Armenian calendar: 538; ԹՎ ՇԼԸ
- Assyrian calendar: 5839
- Balinese saka calendar: 1010–1011
- Bengali calendar: 495–496
- Berber calendar: 2039
- English Regnal year: 2 Will. 2 – 3 Will. 2
- Buddhist calendar: 1633
- Burmese calendar: 451
- Byzantine calendar: 6597–6598
- Chinese calendar: 戊辰年 (Earth Dragon); 3786 or 3579 — to — 己巳年 (Earth Snake); 3787 or 3580
- Coptic calendar: 805–806
- Discordian calendar: 2255
- Ethiopian calendar: 1081–1082
- Hebrew calendar: 4849–4850
- Hindu calendars
- Vikram Samvat: 1145–1146
- Shaka Samvat: 1010–1011
- Kali Yuga: 4189–4190
- Holocene calendar: 11089
- Igbo calendar: 89–90
- Iranian calendar: 467–468
- Islamic calendar: 481–482
- Japanese calendar: Kanji 3 (寛治３年)
- Javanese calendar: 993–994
- Julian calendar: 1089; MLXXXIX
- Korean calendar: 3422
- Minguo calendar: 823 before ROC 民前823年
- Nanakshahi calendar: −379
- Seleucid era: 1400/1401 AG
- Thai solar calendar: 1631–1632
- Tibetan calendar: ས་ཕོ་འབྲུག་ལོ་ (male Earth-Dragon); 1215 or 834 or 62 — to — ས་མོ་སྦྲུལ་ལོ་ (female Earth-Snake); 1216 or 835 or 63

Year 1089 (MLXXXIX) was a common year starting on Monday of the Julian calendar.

== Events ==
=== By place ===
==== Europe ====
- April 20 (possible date) – Demetrius Zvonimir, king of Croatia, dies after a 12-year reign, and is succeeded by Stephen II. Zvonimir's widow, Helena of Hungary, Queen of Croatia, plots the inheritance of the Croatian crown for her brother, King Ladislaus I of Hungary.
- June 24 – Reconquista: Viscount Gaston IV of Béarn (supported by French crusaders) reconquers the Aragonese city of Monzón from Emir Al-Mustain II of the Taifa of Zaragoza.
- August 18 – Henry IV, Holy Roman Emperor, marries Eupraxia of Kiev (daughter of Grand Prince Vsevolod I) at Cologne. She is crowned and assumes the name Adelaide (or Adelheid).
- King George II abdicates the throne in favour of his 16-year-old son David IV ("the Builder") who becomes ruler of Georgia (until 1125).

==== England ====
- August 11 – A powerful earthquake is recorded in England.
- Northumbria is divided by King William II into the counties of Northumberland, County Palatine of Durham, Yorkshire, Westmorland and Lancashire.

=== By topic ===
==== Religion ====
- March 21 – Cîteaux Abbey, the first Cistercian monastery, is established by a group of French monks under Robert of Molesme in southern France.
- August 28 – Braga Cathedral in the County of Portugal has its reconstruction (following 353 years of Muslim occupation) completed sufficiently for its consecration to the Virgin Mary to take place.
- September
  - The Synod of Melfi, led by Pope Urban II (his first papal council), issues decrees against simony and clerical marriage.
  - A church council, held in Constantinople, discuses relations between Eastern and Western Christianity.

== Births ==
- Abraham ibn Ezra, Jewish rabbi and philosopher (d. 1167) (approximate date)
- Berthold of Zwiefalten, German abbot and writer (d. 1169) (approximate date)
- Dahui Zonggao, Chinese Zen Buddhist monk (d. 1163)
- Han Shizhong, Chinese general of the Northern Song dynasty (d. 1151)
- Mahsati, Persian female poet and writer (approximate date)
- Richard de Luci, Norman high sheriff of Essex (d. 1179)
- Sigurd the Crusader, king of Norway (d. 1130)
- Wulgrin II, count of Angoulême (approximate date)

== Deaths ==
- April 20 (possible date) – Demetrius Zvonimir, king of Croatia and Dalmatia
- May 24 – Lanfranc, Italian-born archbishop of Canterbury
- May 29/30 – Mah-i Mulk Khatun wife of caliph al-Muqtadi (r. 1075–1094).
- May 31 – Sigwin von Are, archbishop of Cologne
- October 6 – Adalbero, Prince-Bishop of Würzburg
- November 11 – Peter Igneus, Italian cardinal-bishop
- December 22 – William the Walloon, French abbot
- Agnes of Aquitaine, French-born countess consort of Savoy
- Donnchad mac Domnaill Remair, Irish king of Dublin, killed (approximate date)
- Durandus of Troarn, French monk and theologian
- Isaac ibn Ghiyyat, Spanish Jewish rabbi and philosopher
- Mieszko Bolesławowic, Polish prince of Kraków
- Renauld II, French count of Nevers and Auxerre
- Theobald III of Blois (or Thibaut), French nobleman
