= 1088 =

1088 in various calendars
- Gregorian calendar: 1088; MLXXXVIII
- Ab urbe condita: 1841
- Armenian calendar: 537; ԹՎ ՇԼԷ
- Assyrian calendar: 5838
- Balinese saka calendar: 1009–1010
- Bengali calendar: 494–495
- Berber calendar: 2038
- English Regnal year: 1 Will. 2 – 2 Will. 2
- Buddhist calendar: 1632
- Burmese calendar: 450
- Byzantine calendar: 6596–6597
- Chinese calendar: 丁卯年 (Fire Rabbit); 3785 or 3578 — to — 戊辰年 (Earth Dragon); 3786 or 3579
- Coptic calendar: 804–805
- Discordian calendar: 2254
- Ethiopian calendar: 1080–1081
- Hebrew calendar: 4848–4849
- Hindu calendars
- Vikram Samvat: 1144–1145
- Shaka Samvat: 1009–1010
- Kali Yuga: 4188–4189
- Holocene calendar: 11088
- Igbo calendar: 88–89
- Iranian calendar: 466–467
- Islamic calendar: 480–481
- Japanese calendar: Kanji 2 (寛治２年)
- Javanese calendar: 992–993
- Julian calendar: 1088; MLXXXVIII
- Korean calendar: 3421
- Minguo calendar: 824 before ROC 民前824年
- Nanakshahi calendar: −380
- Seleucid era: 1399/1400 AG
- Thai solar calendar: 1630–1631
- Tibetan calendar: མེ་མོ་ཡོས་ལོ་ (female Fire-Hare); 1214 or 833 or 61 — to — ས་ཕོ་འབྲུག་ལོ་ (male Earth-Dragon); 1215 or 834 or 62

The University of Bologna is established.

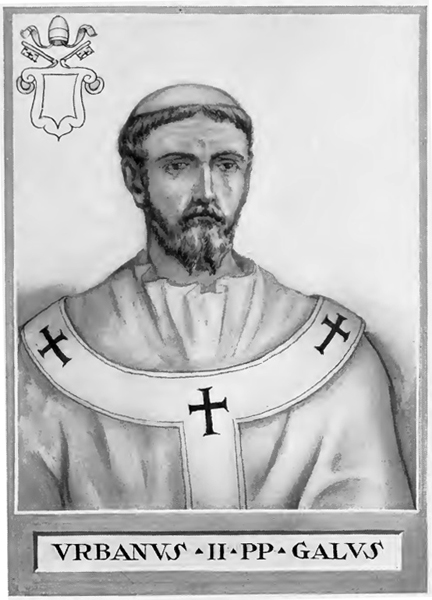
Pope Urban II (Urbanus) (r. 1088–1099)

Year 1088 (MLXXXVIII) was a leap year starting on Saturday of the Julian calendar.

== Events ==
=== By place ===
==== Europe ====
- Almoravid forces (supported with fighters from local Andalusian provinces), under Sultan Yusuf ibn Tashfin, besiege Aledo, but are forced to retreat, by the arrival of Spanish troops of King Alfonso VI ("the Brave") of Castile.
- Catalonian troops, under Count Berenguer Ramon II, reconquer Tarragona (lost again in 1108). He will rule Catalonia with his 6-year-old nephew Ramon Berenguer III, until he comes of age.

==== England ====
- Spring – A rebellion led by William the Conqueror's half-brothers Odo of Bayeux and Robert (2nd Earl of Cornwall), begins against King William II with the aim to remove him from the throne. Odo's revolt in Kent and Sussex is supported by nobles across the country.
- The Worcestershire rebellion led by Robert de Lacy (a son of Ilbert de Lacy) is dealt with quickly by Wulfstan, bishop of Worcester, who calls on those knights and local landowners still loyal to William II to defend Worcester. Many of the rebels are captured or killed.
- William II calls the representatives of the fyrd to a meeting in London. He promises (with the support of Lanfranc, bishop of Canterbury) the people better laws, and the removal of taxes if they support him against the rebels.
- William II lays siege to Pevensey Castle on the south coast where Odo of Bayeux has taken shelter with Robert. Odo is forced to surrender, and agrees to go to Rochester to convince the rebels to accept William as the rightful king of England.
- Summer – William II lays siege to Rochester Castle and puts down the revolt. Odo of Bayeux and the rebels surrender (agreeing only that their lives will be spared). William takes Odo's lands and exiles him to Normandy.

==== Africa ====
- Nasir ibn Alnas, ruler of the Hammadids, dies after a 26-year reign. He is succeeded by his son Al-Mansur ibn al-Nasir (until 1104).

=== By topic ===
==== Arts and Culture ====
- The Dream Pool Essays is published by the Chinese polymath scientist and statesman Shen Kuo. His book represents the earliest known writing about the magnetic compass, movable type printing, experimentation with the camera obscura only decades after Hasan Ibn al-Haytham, which includes many different fields of study in essay and encyclopedic form, including geology, astronomy, archaeology, mathematics, pharmacology, magnetism, geography, optics, hydraulics, economics, military strategy, philosophy, etc. Some of Shen's most advanced theories include geomorphology and climate variability, while he improves Chinese astronomy, by fixing the position of the pole star and correcting the lunar error, by plotting its orbital course every night for a continuum of five years. Shen's book is also the first to describe the drydock in China – and discusses the advantages of the recent invention of the canal pound lock, over the old flash lock.
- Su Song, Chinese polymath scientist and statesman, invents the pilot model for his astronomical clock tower constructed in Kaifeng. It features an escapement mechanism – and the world's oldest known power-transmitting chain drive to operate the armillary sphere, opening doors, and mechanical-driven mannequins, that would rotate in shifts to announce the time on plaques.

==== Education ====
- The oldest extant university, the University of Bologna, is founded in Italy (approximate date).

==== Geology ====
- April 16 – The 6.5 M_{s} Tmogvi earthquake affects the southern provinces of Georgia, which causes the destruction of the castle of Tmogvi and many deaths.

==== Religion ====
- March 12 – Pope Urban II (Urbanus) succeeds Victor III as the 159th pope of the Catholic Church in Rome.

== Births ==
- January 31 – Ja'far ibn Abdallah al-Muqtadi, son of caliph al-Muqtadi and Mah-i Mulk.
- July 24 – Ibn al-Arif, Moorish Sufi scholar and writer (d. 1141)
- November 7 – Hemachandra, Indian Jain poet and polymath (d. 1173)
- Bermudo Pérez de Traba, Spanish nobleman (d. 1168)
- Irene of Hungary, Byzantine empress consort (d. 1134)
- John IV, Byzantine prince and archbishop (approximate date)
- Lucienne de Rochefort, French crown princess (d. 1137)
- Tairrdelbach Ua Conchobair, Irish king of Connacht (d. 1156)
- William III of Mâcon (or William IV of Burgundy), French nobleman (d. 1156)
- Zhenxie Qingliao, Chinese Zen Buddhist monk (d. 1151)

== Deaths ==
- January 6 – Berengar of Tours, French theologian
- April 7 – Burchard II (or Bucco), German bishop
- June 15 – Gebhard of Salzburg, German archbishop
- June 24 – William de Warenne, Norman nobleman
- July 27 – Benno II, German bishop and architect
- September 25 – Godfrey, English bishop of Chichester
- September 28 – Hermann of Salm, German nobleman
- Alberic of Monte Cassino, German Benedictine cardinal
- Berthold of Reichenau, German chronicler and writer
- Dubh Chablaigh ingen Áed, Irish queen consort of Munster
- Hugh de Montfort, Lord of Montfort-sur-Risle, Norman nobleman (approximate date)
- John Doukas, Byzantine usurper (approximate date)
- Khwaja Abdullah Ansari, Persian Sufi poet (b. 1006)
- Mael Isa ua Máilgiric, Irish Chief Ollam and writer
- Marianus Scotus of Regensburg, Irish-born abbot (approximate date)
- Nasir Khusraw, Persian poet and philosopher (b. 1004) (latest date)
- Nasir ibn Alnas, Berber ruler of the Hammadids
- Ranulf I of Caiazzo (or Rainulf), Italo-Norman nobleman
- Rhiryd ap Bleddyn, Welsh king of Powys (b. 1049)
- Tigernach Ua Braín, Irish abbot and writer
