= Durandus =

Durandus is the latinized form of the French name Durand. It may refer to:

- Durandus of Liège (died 1024/5), bishop of Liège
- Durandus of Troarn (c. 1012 – 1089), French Benedictine monk and writer
- Durand of Huesca (c. 1160 – 1224), Spanish theologian also known as Durandus of Huesca
- Guillaume Durand (c. 1230 – November 1, 1296), French liturgist, theologian and Bishop of Mende, also known as Durandus of Mende
- Durandus of Saint-Pourçain (c. 1275 – 13 September 1332 / 10 September 1334), French Dominican theologian
