= 1153 =

1153 in various calendars
- Gregorian calendar: 1153; MCLIII
- Ab urbe condita: 1906
- Armenian calendar: 602; ԹՎ ՈԲ
- Assyrian calendar: 5903
- Balinese saka calendar: 1074–1075
- Bengali calendar: 559–560
- Berber calendar: 2103
- English Regnal year: 18 Ste. 1 – 19 Ste. 1
- Buddhist calendar: 1697
- Burmese calendar: 515
- Byzantine calendar: 6661–6662
- Chinese calendar: 壬申年 (Water Monkey); 3850 or 3643 — to — 癸酉年 (Water Rooster); 3851 or 3644
- Coptic calendar: 869–870
- Discordian calendar: 2319
- Ethiopian calendar: 1145–1146
- Hebrew calendar: 4913–4914
- Hindu calendars
- Vikram Samvat: 1209–1210
- Shaka Samvat: 1074–1075
- Kali Yuga: 4253–4254
- Holocene calendar: 11153
- Igbo calendar: 153–154
- Iranian calendar: 531–532
- Islamic calendar: 547–548
- Japanese calendar: Ninpei 3 (仁平３年)
- Javanese calendar: 1059–1060
- Julian calendar: 1153; MCLIII
- Korean calendar: 3486
- Minguo calendar: 759 before ROC 民前759年
- Nanakshahi calendar: −315
- Seleucid era: 1464/1465 AG
- Thai solar calendar: 1695–1696
- Tibetan calendar: ཆུ་ཕོ་སྤྲེ་ལོ་ (male Water-Monkey); 1279 or 898 or 126 — to — ཆུ་མོ་བྱ་ལོ་ (female Water-Bird); 1280 or 899 or 127

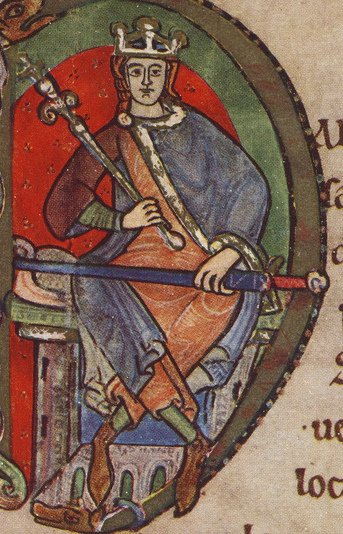
King Malcolm IV (Virgo) (1141–1165)

Year 1153 (MCLIII) was a common year starting on Thursday of the Julian calendar.

== Events ==
=== By place ===
==== Byzantine Empire ====
- Spring – Andronikos I Komnenos, son of Isaac Komnenos, is imprisoned in the imperial palace for conspiring against his uncle, Emperor Manuel I (Komenenos) at Constantinople.

==== Levant ====
- August 19 – Siege of Ascalon: King Baldwin III of Jerusalem captures Ascalon, the last Fatimid fortress in Palestine. The citizens are allowed to leave in peace and return to Egypt.
- Raynald of Châtillon, a French nobleman, marries Constance of Antioch (after given permission by Baldwin III) and becomes Prince of Antioch.

==== Britain ====
- Spring – The 19-year-old Henry II of England lands with a Norman fleet (some 40 ships) on the south coast of England. He defeats King Stephen (a cousin of his mother, Queen Matilda) with a small army at Malmesbury. Henry travels north through the Midlands, while a temporary truce is accepted. Robert de Beaumont, 2nd Earl of Leicester, announces his support for the cause. Hoping to dethrone Stephen and replace him with Matilda.
- May 24 – King David I of Scotland dies after a 29-year reign at Carlisle Castle. He is succeeded by his grandson, the 12-year-old Malcolm IV (Virgo). Malcolm is the eldest son of Henry of Scotland, 3rd Earl of Huntingdon, who is crowned as ruler of Scotland at Scone Priory on May 27. Because of his young age, Donnchad (or Duncan) becomes Malcolm's regent and royal adviser.
- August – Stephen assemble troops to renew the siege of Wallingford Castle in a final attempt to take the stronghold. Henry of Anjou marches south to relieve the siege, arriving with a small army of mercenaries. He places Stephen's besieging troops under siege themselves. Stephen agrees to make a truce and accepts Henry as heir to the English throne.
- November 6 – The Treaty of Wallingford: Henry of Anjou and Stephen ratify the terms of a permanent peace under the direction of Archbishop Theobald of Bec. Ending the civil war (The Anarchy) – between England and Normandy after 18-years. The treaty grants the throne to Stephen for the duration of his life, but makes Henry the heir apparent.

==== Europe ====
- Confronted with important financial difficulty due to the expenses of the Spanish crusade, the Republic of Genoa has to sell a third of the city of Tortosa (which they had conquered in 1148 during an expedition against the Almoravids) to Ramon Berenguer IV, count of Barcelona.

==== Asia ====
- February 10 – Taira no Tadamori dies after a career in which he has used his military and diplomatic skills to subdue the pirates menacing commerce in the Seto Inland Sea. He expands trade with China and becomes the first samurai to serve Emperor Konoe as personal bodyguard. He is succeeded by his son Taira no Kiyomori, who assumes control of the Taira clan. He establishes the first samurai-dominated government in Japan.

==== Africa ====
- King Roger II sends a Sicilian expedition under Admiral Philip of Mahdia to Ifriqiya. With the support of Arab tribes, the Siculo-Normans capture Bona. Then Philip invades the Kerkennah Islands, restoring them to the Sicilian domains in Africa.
- Almohads defeat Banu Hilal in Battle of Sétif.

=== By topic ===
==== Demography ====
- Estimation: Constantinople, capital of the Byzantine Empire, becomes the largest city of the world, taking the lead from Merv in the Seljuk Empire.

==== Religion ====
- July 8 – Pope Eugene III dies after an 8-year pontificate at Tivoli. He is succeeded by Anastasius IV as the 168th pope of the Catholic Church.
- Dhovemi, ruler of the Maldives, converts to Islam and adopts the Muslim title of Sultan Muhammad ibn Abdullah.

== Births ==
- Abu Mohammed Salih, Almohad Sufi leader (d. 1234)
- Aimery of Cyprus (or Amaury), king of Jerusalem (d. 1205)
- Alexios III (Angelos), Byzantine emperor (d. 1211)
- Cathal Crobhdearg Ua Conchobair, Irish king (d. 1224)
- Fujiwara no Kanefusa, Japanese nobleman (d. 1217)
- Harvey I of Léon, Breton nobleman and knight (d. 1203)
- Ibn Hammad, Hammadid historian and writer (d. 1230)
- Kamo no Chōmei, Japanese author and poet (d. 1216)
- Marco I Sanudo, duke of the Archipelago (d. 1227)
- Nerses of Lambron, Armenian archbishop (d. 1198)
- Richard de Clare, 3rd Earl of Hertford (d. 1217)
- Sibylla of Acerra, queen and regent of Sicily (d. 1205)
- Waleran de Beaumont, 4th Earl of Warwick (d. 1204)
- William II (the Good), king of Sicily (d. 1189)

== Deaths ==
- January 28 – Pelagius of Oviedo, Spanish bishop
- February 10 – Taira no Tadamori, Japanese samurai (b. 1096)
- April 16 – Piotr Włostowic, Polish nobleman (b. 1080)
- May 22 – Atto of Pistoia, Portuguese bishop (b. 1070)
- May 24 – David I, king of Scotland (b. 1084)
- June 12 – Roger de Beaumont, 2nd Earl of Warwick
- June 29 – Óláfr Guðrøðarson, king of the Isles
- July 8 – Eugene III, pope of the Catholic Church
- August 16 – Bernard de Tremelay, French Grand Master
- August 17 – Eustace IV, count of Boulogne (b. 1130)
- August 20 – Bernard of Clairvaux, French abbot (b. 1090)
- September 3 – Henry I, German archbishop (b. 1080)
- October 14 – Henry Murdac, English archbishop
- December 16 – Ranulf de Gernon, Norman nobleman (b. 1099)
- Al-Shahrastani, Persian scholar and historian (b. 1086)
- Anna Komnene, Byzantine princess and historian (b. 1083)
- Gampopa, Tibetan Buddhist monk and teacher (b. 1079)
- Shaykh Tabarsi, Persian Shia scholar and writer (b. 1073)
- Simon II de Senlis, 4th Earl of Huntingdon (b. 1098)
- Walter Espec, Norman nobleman and High Sheriff
