= 1099 =

1099 in various calendars
- Gregorian calendar: 1099; MXCIX
- Ab urbe condita: 1852
- Armenian calendar: 548; ԹՎ ՇԽԸ
- Assyrian calendar: 5849
- Balinese saka calendar: 1020–1021
- Bengali calendar: 505–506
- Berber calendar: 2049
- English Regnal year: 12 Will. 2 – 13 Will. 2
- Buddhist calendar: 1643
- Burmese calendar: 461
- Byzantine calendar: 6607–6608
- Chinese calendar: 戊寅年 (Earth Tiger); 3796 or 3589 — to — 己卯年 (Earth Rabbit); 3797 or 3590
- Coptic calendar: 815–816
- Discordian calendar: 2265
- Ethiopian calendar: 1091–1092
- Hebrew calendar: 4859–4860
- Hindu calendars
- Vikram Samvat: 1155–1156
- Shaka Samvat: 1020–1021
- Kali Yuga: 4199–4200
- Holocene calendar: 11099
- Igbo calendar: 99–100
- Iranian calendar: 477–478
- Islamic calendar: 492–493
- Japanese calendar: Jōtoku 3 / Kōwa 1 (康和元年)
- Javanese calendar: 1003–1005
- Julian calendar: 1099; MXCIX
- Korean calendar: 3432
- Minguo calendar: 813 before ROC 民前813年
- Nanakshahi calendar: −369
- Seleucid era: 1410/1411 AG
- Thai solar calendar: 1641–1642
- Tibetan calendar: ས་ཕོ་སྟག་ལོ་ (male Earth-Tiger); 1225 or 844 or 72 — to — ས་མོ་ཡོས་ལོ་ (female Earth-Hare); 1226 or 845 or 73

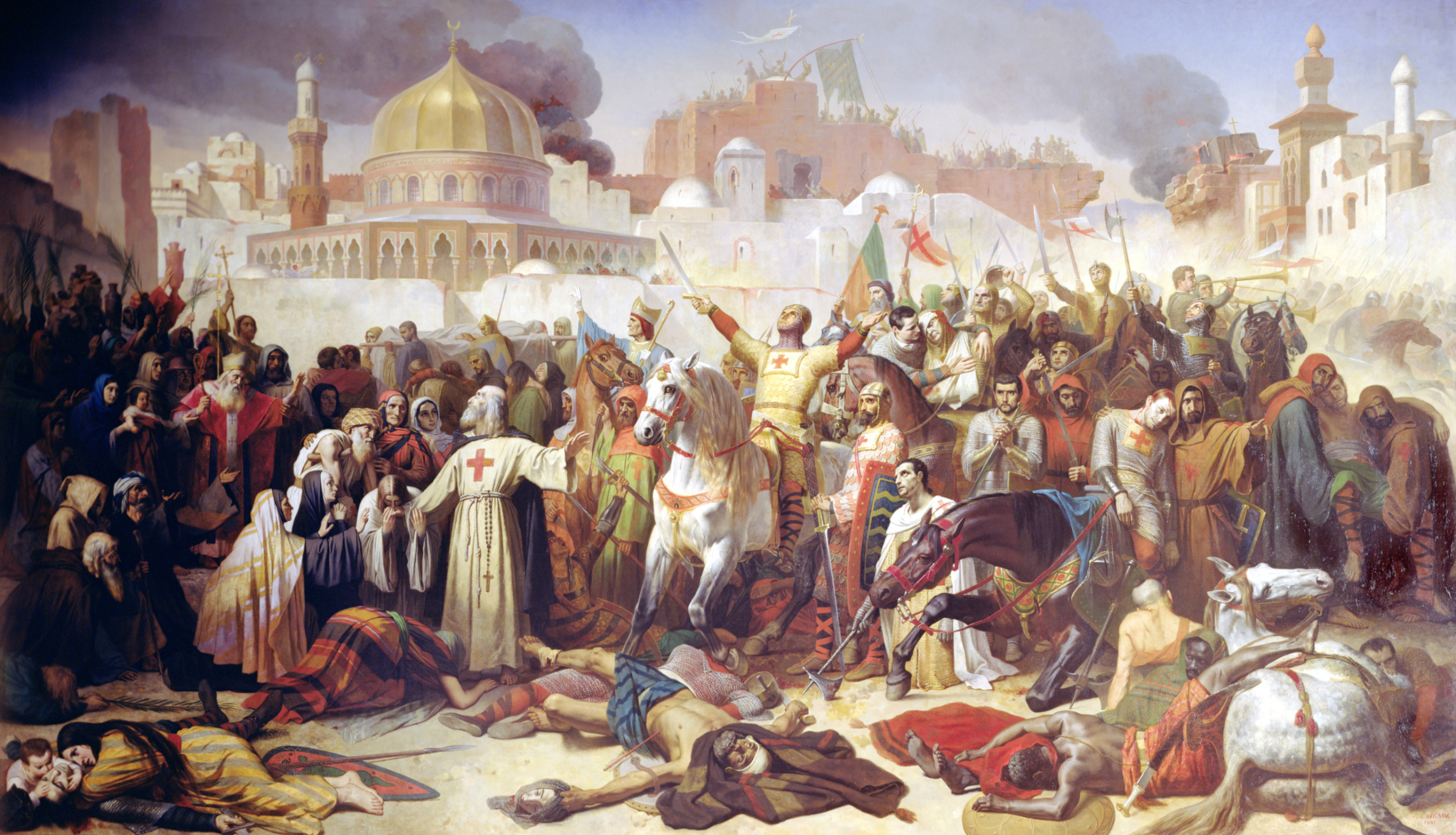
Taking of Jerusalem by the Crusaders.

Year 1099 (MXCIX) was a common year starting on Saturday of the Julian calendar.

== Events ==
=== By place ===
==== First Crusade ====
- January 16 – The Crusaders, under Raymond IV, count of Toulouse (Raymond of Saint-Gilles), leave Antioch, and head south towards Jerusalem. They are joined by forces of Tancred (a nephew of Bohemond I) and Robert II, duke of Normandy. Raymond is given free passage and supplies, and accepts guides from the Emir of Shaizar (modern Syria), who conducts the army (6,000 men) across the Orontes River (between Shaizar and Hama).
- January 22 – The Crusaders, under Raymond IV, reach Masyaf, where a treaty is agreed to. They decide to continue the march, rather than to capture or destroy the town. The next day the Crusaders enter the deserted town of Rafaniyah, that provides them with much-needed supplies. Raymond moves into the Buqaia Valley, and takes the strategic Kurdish fortress of Hosn al-Akrad (the future Krak des Chevaliers castle).
- February – The Crusaders under Godfrey of Bouillon set out from Antioch to Latakia. They are joined by forces of Bohemond I and Robert II, count of Flanders. On their arrival, Bohemond decides to turn back to consolidate his power in Antioch. Godfrey and Robert move on to besiege the small sea-port of Jabala. After two weeks, the Emir of Jabala makes a truce, and accepts the suzerainty of the Crusaders.
- February 14 – The Crusaders under Raymond IV besiege the fortified town of Akkar – whose garrison is loyal to Jalal al-Mulk Abu'l-Hasan, emir of Tripoli (modern Lebanon). On May 13 after a 3-month siege the investment of Akkar is raised and Raymond orders the camp to be struck. The Crusader host, finally joined by the forces of Godfrey of Bouillon and Robert II, resumes his march southwards to Tripoli.
- February 17 – Raymond IV sends a small part of his army under Raymond Pilet to attack the port of Tortosa on the Syrian coast. The Crusaders led many fires around the port to make believe their number is greater than it is. Fooled by the deception, the governor and the garrison flees by sea in the night leaving the port open for the Crusaders to capture. The port becomes strategically important for supplies.
- May – The Crusaders march past Tripoli, accompanied by guides provided by the emir who lead them safely through the towns of Batroun and Byblos. On May 19 they cross the Dog River north of Beirut into Fatimid territory. There local governors supply the Crusaders with tribute and food in return for no damage to the agricultural area. The Fatimids keep no large troops in the north, except for small garrisons.
- May 20 – The Fatimid governor of Sidon refuses to cooperate and his garrison attacks the Crusader host while they are looting local villages. The Fatimids are repulsed, the towns further south generally follow the example of Beirut. The Crusaders move on to Tyre – Raymond IV decides to wait for two days to allow a force under Baldwin of Le Bourg (supported by knights from Antioch) to catch up with him.
- May 26 – The Crusaders march to Haifa and along the coast under Mount Carmel to Caesarea (modern Israel), where they rest for four days in order to celebrate Whitsun (Whit Sunday).
- June 2–6 – The Crusaders occupy Arsuf and turn inland towards Ramlah, where they reorganise for the march against Jerusalem. A Crusader force under Tancred liberates Bethlehem.
- June 7 – Siege of Jerusalem: The Crusaders reach the outskirts of Jerusalem, and begin the siege of the Holy City. Iftikhar al-Dawla offers a peace agreement but this is refused.
- June 13 – The Crusaders under Godfrey of Boullion launch their first assault on Jerusalem, while the Fatimid garrison and Jewish militia defend the northern wall at the Damascus Gate.
- June 17 – A naval squadron of six Genoese ships led by Guglielmo Embriaco (loaded with military materials) enters the port of Jaffa; all except one are trapped by a larger Fatimid fleet.
- July 8 – The Crusaders attempt to take Jerusalem by storm but are repulsed. In a procession they walk around the walls under leadership of priests in the hope the city would surrender.
- July 13 – The Crusader army (some 12,000 men) launch a final assault on Jerusalem. The attacks against the northern and southern wall are repulsed without establishing a foothold.
- July 15
  - The Crusaders breach the walls of Jerusalem after a two-pronged assault.
  - Iftikhar al-Dawla surrenders Jerusalem to Raymond IV in the Tower of David with a great sum of treasure in return for his life. He is escorted out of the city with his bodyguard.
- July 22 – The Kingdom of Jerusalem is established in the Middle East. Godfrey of Bouillon is named king (but refuses to be crowned) and takes the title Advocatus Sancti Sepulchri.
- August 10 – The Crusaders under Godfrey of Bouillon (supported by 1,200–1,300 knights) assemble at Yibna (Ibelin) – close to the coast and almost halfway from Jaffa to Ascalon.
- August 12 – Battle of Ascalon: The Crusader army (some 10,000 men) decisively defeats the Fatimids who are sent to relieve Jerusalem. Vizier Al-Afdal is forced to retreat to Egypt.
- November – A Crusader army under Bohemond I travels south to begin a pilgrimage to Jerusalem. They are accompanied by Baldwin of Boulogne, brother of Godfrey of Bouillon.
- December 21 – The Crusaders under Bohemond I and Baldwin arrive at Jerusalem. Four days later, Daimbert, archbishop of Pisa, is installed as the Latin Patriarch of Jerusalem.

=== By topic ===
==== Natural events ====
- November 11 – Great floods around the North Sea and English Channel.

==== Religion ====
- The commune in Emilia founds the Modena Cathedral, dedicated to the patron saint Geminianus. The Italian sculptor Wiligelmo creates reliefs with Genesis scenes.
- July 29 – Pope Urban II (Urbanus) dies after a 9-year pontificate at Rome. He is succeeded by Paschal II as the 160th pope of the Catholic Church.

== Births ==
- Olav Magnusson, king of Norway (d. 1115)
- Ranulf de Gernon, 4th Earl of Chester, Anglo-Norman nobleman (d. 1153)
- Raymond of Poitiers, prince of Antioch (d. 1149)
- Thierry of Alsace, count of Flanders (d. 1168)
- Duke William X of Aquitaine ("the Saint"), French nobleman (d. 1137)
- Yuri Dolgorukiy, Grand Prince of Kiev (d. 1157)

== Deaths ==
- April 14 – Conrad, bishop of Utrecht
- April 20 – Peter Bartholomew, French soldier and mystic
- July 8 – Lawrence, Croatian monk and archbishop
- July 10 – El Cid (Rodrigo Diaz de Vivar), Castilian knight
- July 18 – Fujiwara no Moromichi, Japanese nobleman (b. 1062)
- July 29 – Urban II, pope of the Catholic Church (b. 1035)
- August 21 – Éverard III of Puiset, Viscount of Chartres, French nobleman
- December 3 – Osmund, Norman lord chancellor of England and bishop of Salisbury, canonized (b. 1065)
- Ermengarde de Carcassonne, French noblewoman
- Donald III ("the Fair"), king of Scotland (b. 1032)
- Rhygyfarch, Welsh bishop of St. David's (b. 1057)
- Walter of Pontoise, French abbot (approximate date)
