= Æthelmær =

Æthelmær is an Old English name borne by many males in Anglo-Saxon and post-Conquest England, including:

- Æthelmær the Stout (died 1015), ealdorman, son of Æthelweard the historian
- Æthelmær, brother of Eadric Streona (died 1017)
- Eilmer of Malmesbury, or Æthelmær (fl. 1066), monk who experimented with aviation
- Æthelmær of Elmham (fl. 1047-1070), bishop of Elmham and brother of Stigand
- Herlewin, or Æthelmær, (died 1137), theologian
