= 1137 =

1137 in various calendars
- Gregorian calendar: 1137; MCXXXVII
- Ab urbe condita: 1890
- Armenian calendar: 586; ԹՎ ՇՁԶ
- Assyrian calendar: 5887
- Balinese saka calendar: 1058–1059
- Bengali calendar: 543–544
- Berber calendar: 2087
- English Regnal year: 2 Ste. 1 – 3 Ste. 1
- Buddhist calendar: 1681
- Burmese calendar: 499
- Byzantine calendar: 6645–6646
- Chinese calendar: 丙辰年 (Fire Dragon); 3834 or 3627 — to — 丁巳年 (Fire Snake); 3835 or 3628
- Coptic calendar: 853–854
- Discordian calendar: 2303
- Ethiopian calendar: 1129–1130
- Hebrew calendar: 4897–4898
- Hindu calendars
- Vikram Samvat: 1193–1194
- Shaka Samvat: 1058–1059
- Kali Yuga: 4237–4238
- Holocene calendar: 11137
- Igbo calendar: 137–138
- Iranian calendar: 515–516
- Islamic calendar: 531–532
- Japanese calendar: Hōen 3 (保延３年)
- Javanese calendar: 1043–1044
- Julian calendar: 1137; MCXXXVII
- Korean calendar: 3470
- Minguo calendar: 775 before ROC 民前775年
- Nanakshahi calendar: −331
- Seleucid era: 1448/1449 AG
- Thai solar calendar: 1679–1680
- Tibetan calendar: མེ་ཕོ་འབྲུག་ལོ་ (male Fire-Dragon); 1263 or 882 or 110 — to — མེ་མོ་སྦྲུལ་ལོ་ (female Fire-Snake); 1264 or 883 or 111

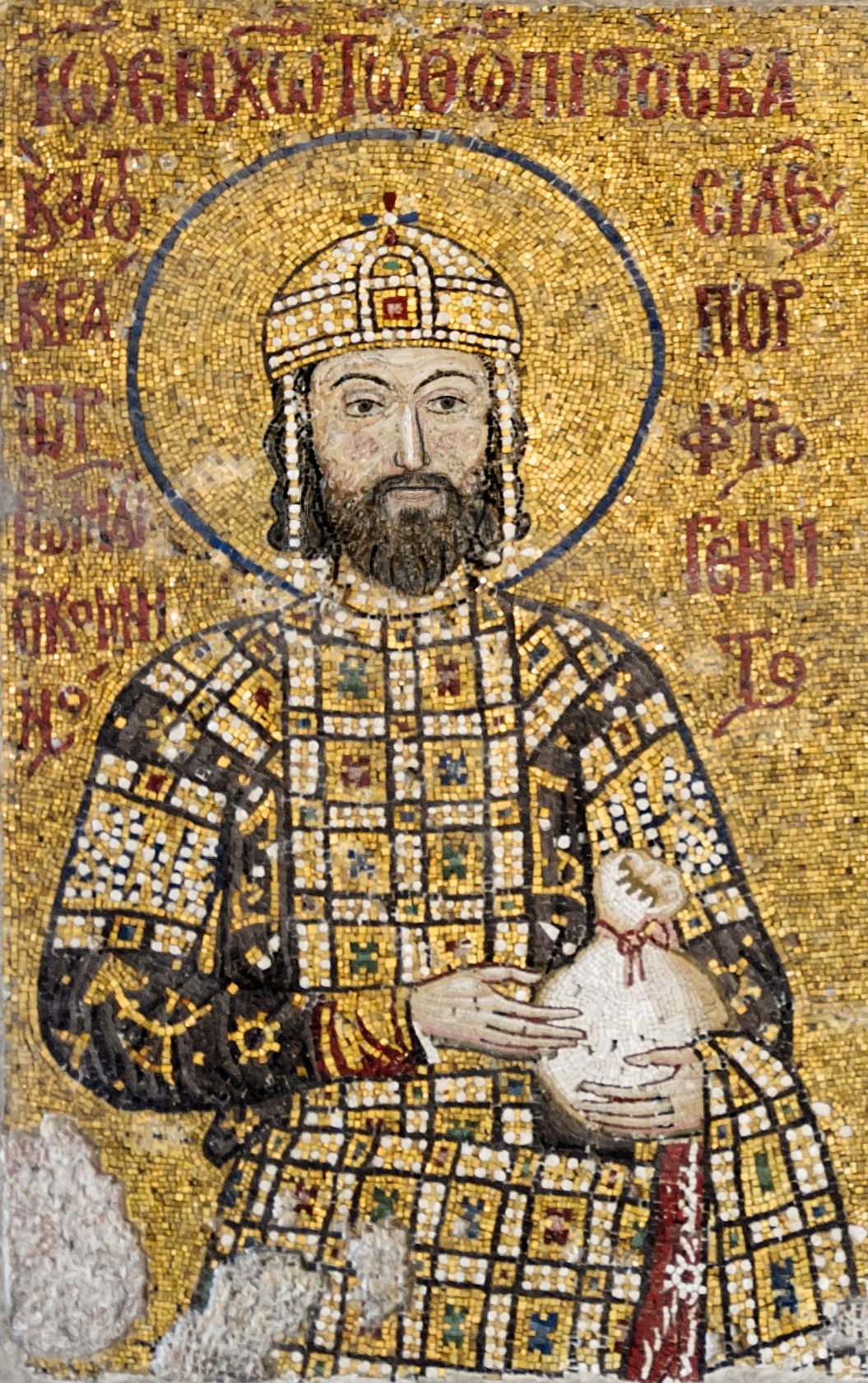
John II (Komnenos) (1087–1143)

Year 1137 (MCXXXVII) was a common year starting on Friday of the Julian calendar.

== Events ==
=== By place ===
==== Byzantine Empire ====
- Spring – Emperor John II (Komnenos) leads a Byzantine expeditionary force into Cilicia (the Byzantine fleet guards his flank). He defeats the Armenians under Prince Leo I ("Lord of the Mountains"), and captures the cities of Mersin, Tarsus, Adana and Mamistra. Leo retreats to the great fortifications of Anazarbus – where its garrison resists for 37 days. The Byzantine siege engines batter down its walls, and the city is forced to surrender. Leo escapes into the Taurus Mountains, while the Byzantine forces march southward into the plain of Antioch.
- August 29 – John II appears before the walls of Antioch, and encamps with the Byzantine army on the north bank of the Orontes River. For several days he besieges the city, Raymond of Poitiers (prince of Antioch) is forced to surrender. He recognizes John as his suzerain and becomes with Joscelin II (count of Edessa) a vassal of the Byzantine Empire.

==== Levant ====
- March 25 – Bazwāj, a mamluk (slave) commander of Damascus, launches a military campaign against Tripoli, reaching Pilgrims' Mount. He defeats a Crusader army under Count Pons (protector of Tripoli). Pons is forced to flee into the mountains where native Christians capture him. Later, he is handed over and instantly put to death by Bazwāj.
- Summer – Battle of Ba'rin: A Crusader force led by King Fulk of Jerusalem is scattered and defeated by Imad al-Din Zengi, Seljuk governor (atabeg) of Mosul. Fulk with a small bodyguard escapes into Montferrand Castle, which is surrounded and besieged by Zengi. After negotiations, Fulk is granted his freedom in exchange for the castle.

==== Europe ====
- April 9 – William X (the Saint), duke of Aquitaine, dies while on a pilgrimage to Santiago de Compostela (modern Spain). On his deathbed, he expresses his wish to see King Louis VI (the Fat) of France as protector of his 15-year-old daughter Eleanor, and to find her a suitable husband.
- July 25 – Louis VI sends his 16-year-old son Louis Capet with an escort of 500 knights to Bordeaux, along with Abbot Suger in charge of the wedding arrangements. Louis and Eleanor are married in the Cathedral of Saint-André. France unites Aquitaine and its territories to the Pyrenees.
- August 1 – Louis VI dies of dysentery at Paris after a 29-year reign. He is succeeded by Louis Capet (known as Louis VII) as King of France. During his accession the burgesses of Orléans and Poitiers revolt – who wish to organise communes (creating independent city-states).
- August 11 – Ramon Berenguer IV, count of Barcelona, is married to Princess Petronilla of Aragon (only 1-year-old) – whose father, King Ramiro II of Aragon, seeks aid from Barcelona against King Alfonso VII of Castile, abdicates the throne in favor of Ramon on November 13.
- October 30 – Battle of Rignano: Sergius VII, duke (magister militum) of Naples, is defeated by the Sicilian forces under King Roger II of Sicily. Sergius is killed and Roger establishes direct control over Naples – nominating his 17-year-old son Alfonso of Capua as the new duke.
- December 4 – Emperor Lothair III dies at Breitenwang in Tyrol, while retreating from Italy after a mutiny among his troops. His son-in-law Henry X (the Proud), duke of Bavaria, inherits the Duchy of Saxony.
- An Almoravid fleet of 37 ships attack the coasts of southern Italy, under Norman rule.

==== Britain ====
- Spring – King Stephen sails to Normandy to confront Geoffrey V (the Fair) and the Angevins, who are attacking the southern areas of Normandy. Although Stephen has some success, he is not able to recapture Normandy from Matilda, daughter and heiress of the late King Henry I.
- King Gruffudd ap Cynan of Gwynedd dies after a 56-year reign, having rebuilt Welsh power overturned earlier by Henry I. He is succeeded by his son Owain Gwynedd who together with his other brothers, Cadwaladr and Cadwallon, work to revive the power of Gwynedd in Wales.
- June 3 – A fire severely damages Rochester Cathedral, but it is soon rebuilt.
- June 4 – A fire destroys much of the city of York, including 39 churches and York Minster.
- June 27 – A fire severely damages the city of Bath.

==== Africa ====
- Egyptian military commander Ridwan ibn Walakhshi appointed Vizier in Egypt.
- In the first commercial treaty between the Almohad Caliphate and a Christian power, the Republic of Genoa obtains trading rights in the port of North Africa.
- The Ethiopian Empire is established by Emperor Mara Takla Haymanot of the Zagwe dynasty.

==== Asia ====
- In China during the Song dynasty, a fire breaks out in the new capital of Hangzhou. The government suspends the requirement of rent payments, alms of 108,840 kg (120 tons) of rice are distributed to the poor, and items such as bamboo, planks and rush-matting are exempted from government taxation.

== Births ==
- Agnes of Poland, Grand Princess of Kiev (d. 1182)
- Bretislav III, bishop of Prague (approximate date)
- Ferdinand II, king of León and Galicia (d. 1188)
- Henry VI, king of Germany (approximate date)
- Ibn Qalaqis, Fatimid poet and writer (d. 1172)
- Ludwig II, count of Württemberg (approximate date)
- Saladin (the Lion), sultan of Egypt and Syria (d. 1193)
- Walter Map, Welsh historian and writer (d. 1209)
- Wenceslaus II, duke of Bohemia (approximate date)
- William I of Blois, count of Boulogne (d. 1159)

== Deaths ==
- January 21 – Guarin, Norman chancellor
- January 27 – John of Crema, Italian cardinal
- March 6 – Olegarius, archbishop of Tarragona (b. 1060)
- March 8 – Adela of Normandy, countess of Blois
- March 25 – Pons, count of Tripoli (b. 1098)
- April 9 – William X (the Saint), duke of Aquitaine (b. 1099)
- May 5 – Asser Thorkilsson, archbishop of Lund
- May 11 – Herlewin, English ascetic writer
- June 20 – John I, bishop of Rochester
- June 23 – Adalbert I, archbishop of Mainz
- July 10 – Pain fitzJohn, Norman nobleman
- August 1 – Louis VI (the Fat), king of France (b. 1081)
- September 18 – Eric II, king of Denmark (b. 1090)
- October 30 – Sergius VII, duke of Naples
- December 4 – Lothair III, Holy Roman Emperor (b. 1075)
- Amaury III de Montfort, French nobleman
- Bruno II of Berg, archbishop of Cologne
- Eustorge de Scorailles, bishop of Limoges
- Gottfried II of Raabs, German nobleman
- Gruffudd ap Cynan, king of Gwynedd
- Gruffydd ap Rhys, king of Deheubarth
- John XI bar Mawdyono, patriarch of Antioch
- Lucienne de Rochefort, French princess (b. 1088)
- Nicephorus Bryennius, Byzantine statesman (b. 1062)
- Ramanuja, Indian Sri Vaishnavism philosopher (b. 1017)

== Sources ==
- Picard, Christophe (1997). La mer et les musulmans d'occident au Moyen Âge, VIIIe-XIIIe siècle (in French). Presses Universitaires de France. ISBN 978-2130488101.
