= 1097 =

1097 in various calendars
- Gregorian calendar: 1097; MXCVII
- Ab urbe condita: 1850
- Armenian calendar: 546; ԹՎ ՇԽԶ
- Assyrian calendar: 5847
- Balinese saka calendar: 1018–1019
- Bengali calendar: 503–504
- Berber calendar: 2047
- English Regnal year: 10 Will. 2 – 11 Will. 2
- Buddhist calendar: 1641
- Burmese calendar: 459
- Byzantine calendar: 6605–6606
- Chinese calendar: 丙子年 (Fire Rat); 3794 or 3587 — to — 丁丑年 (Fire Ox); 3795 or 3588
- Coptic calendar: 813–814
- Discordian calendar: 2263
- Ethiopian calendar: 1089–1090
- Hebrew calendar: 4857–4858
- Hindu calendars
- Vikram Samvat: 1153–1154
- Shaka Samvat: 1018–1019
- Kali Yuga: 4197–4198
- Holocene calendar: 11097
- Igbo calendar: 97–98
- Iranian calendar: 475–476
- Islamic calendar: 490–491
- Japanese calendar: Eichō 2 / Jōtoku 1 (承徳元年)
- Javanese calendar: 1001–1002
- Julian calendar: 1097; MXCVII
- Korean calendar: 3430
- Minguo calendar: 815 before ROC 民前815年
- Nanakshahi calendar: −371
- Seleucid era: 1408/1409 AG
- Thai solar calendar: 1639–1640
- Tibetan calendar: མེ་ཕོ་བྱི་བ་ལོ་ (male Fire-Rat); 1223 or 842 or 70 — to — མེ་མོ་གླང་ལོ་ (female Fire-Ox); 1224 or 843 or 71

Map of Anatolia during the First Crusade.

Year 1097 (MXCVII) was a common year starting on Thursday of the Julian calendar.

== Events ==
=== By place ===
==== First Crusade ====
- Spring – The Crusaders under Godfrey of Bouillon attack the Byzantine imperial palace at Blachernae. Norman forces led by Bohemond I join the Crusaders – he is not welcome in Constantinople because his father, Robert Guiscard, has invaded Illyria (territory belonging to the Byzantine Empire), and captured the cities of Dyrrhachium and Corfu (see 1084).
- May 14 – Siege of Nicaea: The Crusaders begin their campaign with the siege of Nicaea (the capital of the Sultanate of Rum), assigning their forces to different sections of the walls, which are well-defended with 200 towers. Towards the end, an advance party of the Seljuk Turks is defeated by troops of Raymond IV of Toulouse ("Saint-Gilles") and Robert II.
- June 19 – The Seljuk Turks surrender Nicaea to the Crusaders after a month siege. The Byzantines occupy the city; their commander Manuel Boutoumites is named by Emperor Alexios I Komnenos as doux of Nicaea. In the consternation the Crusaders are not allowed to plunder the city and are forced (again) to pledge their allegiance to Alexios.
- July 1 – Battle of Dorylaeum: The Crusaders defeat a Seljuk army led by Kilij Arslan I, ruler of the Sultanate of Rum, who wants revenge for the capture of Nicaea. During the battle many Crusaders are killed but the Seljuk Turks are forced to flee and abandon their tents and treasure after being surprised by the arrival of a second Crusader army.
- October 21 – Siege of Antioch: The Crusaders arrive outside the city and begin the siege. They can not impose a complete blockade on Antioch. The Seljuk garrison comes out of the city to harass Crusader siege-lines and intercept supply convoys (supported by a Genoese fleet of 12 galleys) from Saint Symeon and Alexandretta (modern Turkey).
- December 31 – Battle of Harenc: The Crusaders under the command of Bohemond I and Robert II defeat Seljuk forces from Aleppo, which try to relieve besieged Antioch.

==== Europe ====
- April/May – Battle of Gvozd Mountain: In an attempt to win the crown of the Kingdom of Croatia, the Hungarian army crosses the Drava River and invades Croatia. King Peter II of Croatia moves his residency at Knin Castle to defend his kingdom. The two armies meet each other near Gvozd Mountain (modern-day Mala Kapela). After a fierce battle Peter, the last Croatian king, is defeated and killed by the Hungarians.
- Summer – Almoravid forces launch a new campaign in Al-Andalus (modern Spain). Sultan Yusuf ibn Tashfin, leader of the Almoravid Empire, is honored with the title of Amir al Muslimin ("Commander of the Muslims").
- August 15 – Battle of Consuegra: The Castilian and Leonese army (30,000 men) of King Alfonso VI ('"the Brave") is defeated by Almoravid forces (10,000 men) near the Castle of Consuegra.

==== Scotland ====
- King Donald III of Scotland ("the Fair") is deposed by his nephew Edgar (who is supported by King William II of England) after a 4-year reign. Edgar (nicknamed Probus, "the Valliant") becomes ruler of Scotland until 1107.

==== England ====
- William II orders the construction of Westminster Hall near Westminster Abbey in London. The hall is designed to hold banquets, ceremonies and coronations that take place in the Abbey nearby.

=== By topic ===
==== Religion ====
- October – Anselm, archbishop of Canterbury, goes into exile. Conflicts between him and William II result in Anselm leaving England and heading for Rome. William confiscates Anselm's land.

== Births ==
- March 15 – Fujiwara no Tadamichi, Japanese nobleman (d. 1164)
- November 5 – André de Montbard, French nobleman (d. 1156)
- Abu al-Najib Suhrawardi, Persian scholar and Sufi (d. 1168)
- Abu'l-Hasan Bayhaqi, Persian polymath and official (d. 1169)
- Cecile of France, French princess and countess of Tripoli (d. 1145)
- Conrad I ("the Great"), margrave of Meissen (approximate date) (d. 1157)
- Muhammad Buzurg Ummid, Persian ruler of Alamut (d. 1162)
- Zhang Jun, Chinese general and grand chancellor (d. 1164)

== Deaths ==
- June 6 – Agnes of Aquitaine, queen consort of Aragon and Navarre
- June 16 – Wen Yanbo, Chinese grand chancellor (b. 1006)
- August 15 – Diego Rodríguez, Castilian nobleman
- August 20 – Albert Azzo II, margrave of Milan and Liguria
- November 6 – Heonjong, Korean king of Goryeo (b. 1084)
- Baldwin Chauderon, French nobleman and crusader
- Florine of Burgundy, French noblewoman and crusader (b. 1083)
- Herman of Hauteville, Norman nobleman and crusader
- Marpa Lotsawa, Tibetan Buddhist teacher (b. 1012)
- Minamoto no Tsunenobu, Japanese nobleman (b. 1016)
- Muhya bint Al-Tayyani, Andalusian female poet
- Odo of Bayeux, Norman nobleman and bishop
- Peter II, king of Croatia (see Battle of Gvozd Mountain)
- Sweyn the Crusader, Danish nobleman and crusader
