= 1062 =

1062 in various calendars
- Gregorian calendar: 1062; MLXII
- Ab urbe condita: 1815
- Armenian calendar: 511; ԹՎ ՇԺԱ
- Assyrian calendar: 5812
- Balinese saka calendar: 983–984
- Bengali calendar: 468–469
- Berber calendar: 2012
- English Regnal year: N/A
- Buddhist calendar: 1606
- Burmese calendar: 424
- Byzantine calendar: 6570–6571
- Chinese calendar: 辛丑年 (Metal Ox); 3759 or 3552 — to — 壬寅年 (Water Tiger); 3760 or 3553
- Coptic calendar: 778–779
- Discordian calendar: 2228
- Ethiopian calendar: 1054–1055
- Hebrew calendar: 4822–4823
- Hindu calendars
- Vikram Samvat: 1118–1119
- Shaka Samvat: 983–984
- Kali Yuga: 4162–4163
- Holocene calendar: 11062
- Igbo calendar: 62–63
- Iranian calendar: 440–441
- Islamic calendar: 453–454
- Japanese calendar: Kōhei 5 (康平５年)
- Javanese calendar: 965–966
- Julian calendar: 1062; MLXII
- Korean calendar: 3395
- Minguo calendar: 850 before ROC 民前850年
- Nanakshahi calendar: −406
- Seleucid era: 1373/1374 AG
- Thai solar calendar: 1604–1605
- Tibetan calendar: ལྕགས་མོ་གླང་ལོ་ (female Iron-Ox); 1188 or 807 or 35 — to — ཆུ་ཕོ་སྟག་ལོ་ (male Water-Tiger); 1189 or 808 or 36

Map of Wales during the reign of Gruffydd ap Llywelyn (r. 1039–1063). Gruffydd ap Llywelyn's kingdom

Year 1062 (MLXII) was a common year starting on Tuesday of the Julian calendar.

== Events ==
=== By place ===
==== Europe ====
- Spring – Coup of Kaiserswerth: The 11-year-old King Henry IV is abducted, as a result of a conspiracy of German nobles led by Anno II, archbishop of Cologne. Henry's education and training is supervised by Anno, who acts as his regent and is called his magister (his "master" or "teacher"). Empress Agnes of Poitou (Henry's mother) resigns the throne, and Anno with the archbishops Siegfried I and Adalbert of Hamburg takes her place.

==== Britain ====
- Winter – Harold Godwinson leads a successful campaign against King Gruffydd ap Llywelyn. He attacks and captures Rhuddlan Castle in northern Wales, but Gruffydd manages to escape.

==== Africa ====
- The Almoravids overrun modern-day Morocco, and establish an intercontinental kingdom, stretching from Spain to Senegal.
- The Banu Khurasan, a vassal of the Hammdid Dynasty, begin to rule the north of Ifriqiya (modern Tunisia).
- Marrakesh is founded by the Almoravids which becomes their capital.

=== By topic ===
==== Religion ====
- Affligem Abbey, of the Order of St. Benedict, is founded in Affligem (modern Belgium).

== Births ==
- Bjørn Svendsen, Danish nobleman (approximate date)
- Fujiwara no Moromichi, Japanese nobleman (d. 1099)
- Nicephorus Bryennius, Byzantine statesman (d. 1137)
- Nicephorus Komnenos, Byzantine aristocrat

== Deaths ==
- January 27 – Adelaide of Hungary, German duchess
- February 2 – Atenulf I, Lombard nobleman
- March 9 – Herbert II, French nobleman
- May 20 – Bao Zheng, Chinese politician (b. 999)
- October 22
  - Abe no Sadato, Japanese nobleman
  - Fujiwara no Tsunekiyo, Japanese nobleman
- Abu Mansur Fulad Sutun, Buyid emir of Fars
- Al-Mu'izz ibn Badis, Zirid ruler of Ifriqiya (b. 1008)
- Al-Quda'i, Fatimid preacher and historian
- Emma of Provence, French noblewoman
- Geoffrey I, French nobleman (approximate date)
- Mu'izz al-Dawla Thimal, Mirdasid emir of Aleppo
- Nissim ben Jacob, Tunisian Jewish rabbi (b. 990)
- William IV, count of Weimar and Orlamünde
- Ibn al-Timnah, Emir of Syracuse
