= 1084 =

1084 in various calendars
- Gregorian calendar: 1084; MLXXXIV
- Ab urbe condita: 1837
- Armenian calendar: 533; ԹՎ ՇԼԳ
- Assyrian calendar: 5834
- Balinese saka calendar: 1005–1006
- Bengali calendar: 490–491
- Berber calendar: 2034
- English Regnal year: 18 Will. 1 – 19 Will. 1
- Buddhist calendar: 1628
- Burmese calendar: 446
- Byzantine calendar: 6592–6593
- Chinese calendar: 癸亥年 (Water Pig); 3781 or 3574 — to — 甲子年 (Wood Rat); 3782 or 3575
- Coptic calendar: 800–801
- Discordian calendar: 2250
- Ethiopian calendar: 1076–1077
- Hebrew calendar: 4844–4845
- Hindu calendars
- Vikram Samvat: 1140–1141
- Shaka Samvat: 1005–1006
- Kali Yuga: 4184–4185
- Holocene calendar: 11084
- Igbo calendar: 84–85
- Iranian calendar: 462–463
- Islamic calendar: 476–477
- Japanese calendar: Eihō 4 / Ōtoku 1 (応徳元年)
- Javanese calendar: 988–989
- Julian calendar: 1084; MLXXXIV
- Korean calendar: 3417
- Minguo calendar: 828 before ROC 民前828年
- Nanakshahi calendar: −384
- Seleucid era: 1395/1396 AG
- Thai solar calendar: 1626–1627
- Tibetan calendar: ཆུ་མོ་ཕག་ལོ་ (female Water-Boar); 1210 or 829 or 57 — to — ཤིང་ཕོ་བྱི་བ་ལོ་ (male Wood-Rat); 1211 or 830 or 58

Map of the Norman expansion in Italy and Illyria during the rule of Robert Guiscard.

Year 1084 (MLXXXIV) was a leap year starting on Monday of the Julian calendar.

== Events ==
=== By place ===
==== Europe ====
- March 31 – Emperor Henry IV besieges Rome and enters the city. He is crowned Holy Roman Emperor by Antipope Clement III in Rome and receives the patrician authority.
- May – Sack of Rome: Duke Robert Guiscard leads a Norman army (36,000 men) north and enters Rome; the city is sacked, and Henry IV is forced to retreat.
- Robert Guiscard returns with 150 warships in Illyria (modern Albania), and occupies Corfu and Kefalonia with the support of Ragusa and the Dalmatian city-states.
- King Halsten Stenkilsson is killed and his brother Inge the Elder is deposed in Svealand (modern Sweden). Inge is replaced by his brother-in-law Blot-Sweyn.

==== Seljuk Empire ====
- The Seljuk Turks under Sultan Malik-Shah I conquer Byzantine Antioch, held by Philaretos Brachamios, an Armenian general, who seizes power as a usurper.

==== Asia ====
- Sima Guang, Chinese chancellor and historian, with a group of scholars, completes the Zizhi Tongjian, a chronicle of universal history of China.
- April 21 – King Kyansittha begins his reign as ruler of the Pagan Kingdom in Burma (modern Myanmar).

=== By topic ===
==== Religion ====
- Pope Gregory VII, who has been forced by the presence in Rome of Henry IV to retreat to the Castel Sant'Angelo, is freed by Robert Guiscard and restores papal authority in Rome.
- Bruno of Cologne founds the Carthusian Order which includes both monks and nuns. He builds a hermitage in the French Alps.
- Building work starts on Worcester Cathedral in England, orchestrated by Bishop Wulfstan.

== Births ==
- August 1 – Heonjong, Korean king of Goryeo (d. 1097)
- Alan I (le Noir), viscount of Rohan (d. 1147)
- Ali ibn Yusuf, ruler of the Almoravids (d. 1143)
- Bahram-Shah, ruler of the Ghaznavids (d. 1157)
- Charles I (the Good), count of Flanders (d. 1127)
- David I, king of Scotland (approximate date)
- Li Qingzhao, Chinese female poet and writer
- Rainier, margrave of Montferrat (approximate date)
- Rechungpa, Tibetan founder of the Kagyu school (d. 1161)
- Wang, Chinese empress of the Song dynasty (d. 1108)

== Deaths ==
- February 16 – Siegfried I, archbishop of Mainz
- June 28 – Ekkehard of Huysburg, German abbot
- October 10 – Gilla Pátraic, bishop of Dublin
- November 20 – Otto II, margrave of Montferrat
- Aghsartan I, Georgian king of Kakheti and Hereti
- Fujiwara no Kenshi, Japanese empress (b. 1057)
- Halsten Stenkilsson, king of Sweden (approximate date)
- Herfast (or Arfast), Norman Lord Chancellor
- Hoël II, duke of Brittany (House of Cornouaille)
- Saw Lu, king of the Pagan Kingdom (b. 1049)
