= 1049 =

1049 in various calendars
- Gregorian calendar: 1049; MXLIX
- Ab urbe condita: 1802
- Armenian calendar: 498; ԹՎ ՆՂԸ
- Assyrian calendar: 5799
- Balinese saka calendar: 970–971
- Bengali calendar: 455–456
- Berber calendar: 1999
- English Regnal year: N/A
- Buddhist calendar: 1593
- Burmese calendar: 411
- Byzantine calendar: 6557–6558
- Chinese calendar: 戊子年 (Earth Rat); 3746 or 3539 — to — 己丑年 (Earth Ox); 3747 or 3540
- Coptic calendar: 765–766
- Discordian calendar: 2215
- Ethiopian calendar: 1041–1042
- Hebrew calendar: 4809–4810
- Hindu calendars
- Vikram Samvat: 1105–1106
- Shaka Samvat: 970–971
- Kali Yuga: 4149–4150
- Holocene calendar: 11049
- Igbo calendar: 49–50
- Iranian calendar: 427–428
- Islamic calendar: 440–441
- Japanese calendar: Eishō 4 (永承４年)
- Javanese calendar: 952–953
- Julian calendar: 1049; MXLIX
- Korean calendar: 3382
- Minguo calendar: 863 before ROC 民前863年
- Nanakshahi calendar: −419
- Seleucid era: 1360/1361 AG
- Thai solar calendar: 1591–1592
- Tibetan calendar: ས་ཕོ་བྱི་བ་ལོ་ (male Earth-Rat); 1175 or 794 or 22 — to — ས་མོ་གླང་ལོ་ (female Earth-Ox); 1176 or 795 or 23

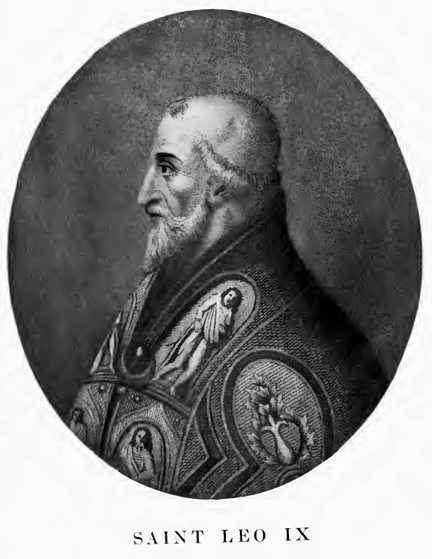
Pope Leo IX (1002–1054)

Year 1049 (MXLIX) was a common year starting on Sunday of the Julian calendar.

== Events ==
=== By place ===
==== Byzantine Empire ====
- Spring – Pecheneg revolt: Emperor Constantine IX decides to transfer 15,000 Pecheneg warriors from their positions in the Balkans to the eastern front. Upon approaching the Bosporus, the Pechenegs decide to turn back, and march through Bulgaria, until they reach the Byzantine city of Serdia. Later, joined by followers, the Pecheneg tribes raise the banner of revolt in Thrace.

==== Europe ====
- January 13 – Theodwin, prince-bishop of Liège, defeats Count Dirk IV of West Frisia near Dordrecht and restores imperial authority in the Rhine Delta.
- The Republic of Pisa successfully completes the conquest of Sardinia, from the Andalusian occupiers. ^{[Dubious claim; since Sardinia was already governed by the Giudici by this time]}

==== British Isles ====
- Viking Irish raiders ally with King Gruffydd ap Rhydderch of Gwent in raiding along the River Severn.

==== Africa ====
- The Banu Hilal, a confederation of tribes of Arabia, begin their invasion in the Maghreb (North Africa). They are organized by the Egyptian Fatimid Caliphate to punish their former Zirid vassals.

==== Asia ====
- The Iron Pagoda in Kaifeng is constructed, during the Chinese Song dynasty.

=== By topic ===
==== Religion ====
- February 12 – Pope Leo IX succeeds Damasus II, as the 152nd pope of the Catholic Church. He goes on a one-year trip to promote the cause of the reformist program among the European prelates.

== Births ==
- October 9 – Seonjong, king of Goryeo (d. 1094)
- Godelieve, Flemish saint (approximate date)
- Hermann II, count palatine of Lotharingia (d. 1085)
- John Theristus, Italian Benedictine monk (d. 1129)
- Li Gonglin, Chinese painter and antiquarian (d. 1106)
- Peter de Honestis, Italian monk (approximate date)
- Saw Lu, king of the Pagan Kingdom (d. 1084)
- Rhiryd ap Bleddyn, king of Powys (d. 1088)

== Deaths ==
- January 1 – Odilo of Cluny, French Benedictine abbot
- January 12 – Abū-Sa'īd Abul-Khayr, Persian Sufi poet (b. 967)
- January 13 – Dirk IV, count of Friesland west of the Vlie
- December 1 – Ermesinda of Bigorre, queen of Aragon (b. 1015)
- Airlangga, Indonesian ruler (raja) of Kahuripan.
