= 1168 =

1168 in various calendars
- Gregorian calendar: 1168; MCLXVIII
- Ab urbe condita: 1921
- Armenian calendar: 617; ԹՎ ՈԺԷ
- Assyrian calendar: 5918
- Balinese saka calendar: 1089–1090
- Bengali calendar: 574–575
- Berber calendar: 2118
- English Regnal year: 14 Hen. 2 – 15 Hen. 2
- Buddhist calendar: 1712
- Burmese calendar: 530
- Byzantine calendar: 6676–6677
- Chinese calendar: 丁亥年 (Fire Pig); 3865 or 3658 — to — 戊子年 (Earth Rat); 3866 or 3659
- Coptic calendar: 884–885
- Discordian calendar: 2334
- Ethiopian calendar: 1160–1161
- Hebrew calendar: 4928–4929
- Hindu calendars
- Vikram Samvat: 1224–1225
- Shaka Samvat: 1089–1090
- Kali Yuga: 4268–4269
- Holocene calendar: 11168
- Igbo calendar: 168–169
- Iranian calendar: 546–547
- Islamic calendar: 563–564
- Japanese calendar: Nin'an 3 (仁安３年)
- Javanese calendar: 1075–1076
- Julian calendar: 1168; MCLXVIII
- Korean calendar: 3501
- Minguo calendar: 744 before ROC 民前744年
- Nanakshahi calendar: −300
- Seleucid era: 1479/1480 AG
- Thai solar calendar: 1710–1711
- Tibetan calendar: མེ་མོ་ཕག་ལོ་ (female Fire-Boar); 1294 or 913 or 141 — to — ས་ཕོ་བྱི་བ་ལོ་ (male Earth-Rat); 1295 or 914 or 142

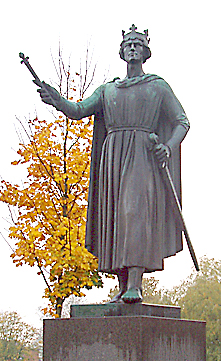
King Valdemar I (1131–1182)

Year 1168 (MCLXVIII) was a leap year starting on Monday of the Julian calendar.

== Events ==
=== By place ===
==== Levant ====
- Summer – King Amalric I of Jerusalem and Byzantine emperor Manuel I Komnenos negotiate an alliance against Fatimid-Egypt. Archbishop William of Tyre is among the ambassadors sent to Constantinople to finalize the treaty.
- Autumn – Count William IV of Nevers, arrives in Palestine with a contingent of elite knights. In Jerusalem he is present during a council with Amalric and other nobles to decide on an expedition to Egypt.
- October 20 – Amalric I invades Egypt again from Ascalon, sacking Bilbeis and threatening Cairo. In November, a Crusader fleet sails up the Nile and arrives in Lake Manzala, sacking the town of Tanis.
- Nur al-Din, Zangid ruler (atabeg) of Aleppo, sends an expedition under General Shirkuh to Egypt on request of the Fatimid caliph Al-Adid. He offers him a third of the land, and fiefs for his generals.

==== Egypt ====
- December 22 – Afraid that the Egyptian capital Fustat (modern-day Old Cairo) will be captured by Crusader forces, its Fatimid vizier, Shawar, orders the city set afire. The capital burns for 54 days.

==== Europe ====
- March 27 – Patrick of Salisbury, Angevin governor of Poitou, is killed in an ambush at Poitiers by French forces under Guy of Lusignan. He is escorting Queen Eleanor of Aquitaine on a journey near the border of Aquitaine. Patrick's nephew, William Marshal, is part of the royal escort and is taken prisoner. Later he is ransomed and becomes a member of Eleanor's household.
- King Valdemar I ("the Great") of Denmark conquers the Wendish capital at Arkona on the island of Rügen (modern Germany). The Wends become Christians and subject to Danish suzerainty.
- Henry the Lion, duke of Saxony, marries the 12-year-old Matilda (or Maud), daughter of King Henry II of England.
- The newly born Commune of Rome conquers and destroys the rival neighboring city of Albano (modern Italy).
- Stephen du Perche, Sicilian chancellor, is accused of plotting to claim the throne and is forced to flee.

==== Asia ====
- April 9 – Emperor Rokujō of Japan is deposed by his grandfather, retired-Emperor Go-Shirakawa, after an 8-month reign. He is succeeded by his 6-year-old uncle, Takakura, as the 80th emperor.
- Yuanqu County (also known as Wanting County) in China is destroyed by a flood of the Yellow River.

=== By topic ===
==== Religion ====
- September 20 – Antipope Paschal III dies at Rome after a 4-year reign. Giovanni di Struma is elected as his successor and will reign as Antipope Callixtus III with support from Emperor Frederick I.

== Births ==
- April 22 – Abubakar ibn Gussom, Arab poet (d. 1242)
- August 31 – Emperor Zhangzong of Jin, Chinese ruler (d. 1208)
- November 19 – Emperor Ningzong, Chinese ruler (d. 1224)
- Ibn Muti al-Zawawi, Arab jurist and philologian (d. 1231)
- Robert of Braybrooke, English High Sheriff (d. 1210)
- Robert of Courtenay, Lord of Champignelles, French nobleman and knight (d. 1239)
- Temüge (or Otgon), brother of Genghis Khan (d. 1246)
- William de Ferrers, 4th Earl of Derby (approximate date)

== Deaths ==
- January 17 – Thierry of Alsace, count of Flanders (b. 1099)
- March 27 – Patrick of Salisbury, Norman nobleman (b. 1122)
- April 5 – Robert de Beaumont, English nobleman (b. 1104)
- September 20 – Paschal III, antipope of Rome (b. 1110)
- October 24 – William IV, count of Auxerre and Nevers
- November 5 – Hugh IX of Lusignan, French nobleman
- Abu al-Najib Suhrawardi, Persian scholar (b. 1097)
- Bermudo Pérez de Traba, Spanish nobleman (b. 1088)
- Conrad of Babenberg, archbishop of Salzburg (b. 1115)
- Wivina, French Benedictine abbess and saint (b. 1103)
