= 1006 =

Calendar year

1006 in various calendars
- Gregorian calendar: 1006; MVI
- Ab urbe condita: 1759
- Armenian calendar: 455; ԹՎ ՆԾԵ
- Assyrian calendar: 5756
- Balinese saka calendar: 927–928
- Bengali calendar: 412–413
- Berber calendar: 1956
- English Regnal year: N/A
- Buddhist calendar: 1550
- Burmese calendar: 368
- Byzantine calendar: 6514–6515
- Chinese calendar: 乙巳年 (Wood Snake); 3703 or 3496 — to — 丙午年 (Fire Horse); 3704 or 3497
- Coptic calendar: 722–723
- Discordian calendar: 2172
- Ethiopian calendar: 998–999
- Hebrew calendar: 4766–4767
- Hindu calendars
- Vikram Samvat: 1062–1063
- Shaka Samvat: 927–928
- Kali Yuga: 4106–4107
- Holocene calendar: 11006
- Igbo calendar: 6–7
- Iranian calendar: 384–385
- Islamic calendar: 396–397
- Japanese calendar: Kankō 3 (寛弘３年)
- Javanese calendar: 908–909
- Julian calendar: 1006; MVI
- Korean calendar: 3339
- Minguo calendar: 906 before ROC 民前906年
- Nanakshahi calendar: −462
- Seleucid era: 1317/1318 AG
- Thai solar calendar: 1548–1549
- Tibetan calendar: ཤིང་མོ་སྦྲུལ་ལོ་ (female Wood-Snake); 1132 or 751 or −21 — to — མེ་ཕོ་རྟ་ལོ་ (male Fire-Horse); 1133 or 752 or −20

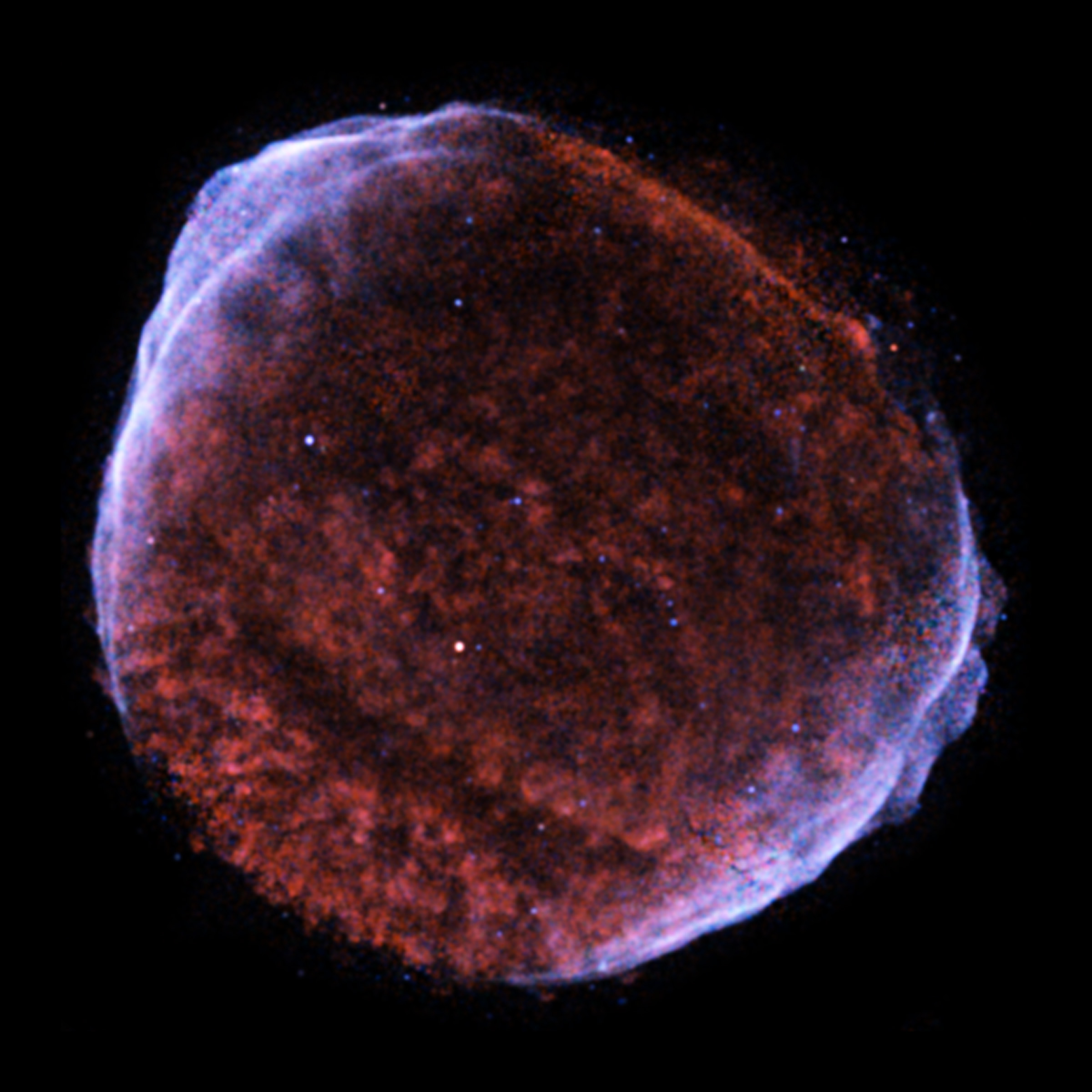
SN 1006 supernova remnant (2008)

Year 1006 (MVI) was a common year starting on Tuesday of the Julian calendar.

== Events ==
=== By place ===
==== Europe ====
- Summer – An Arab Saracen fleet appears before Pisa, but departs again. The Pisans take their fleet to sea and chase the Arabs down to Southern Italy where, in the Battle of Reggio Calabria, the Pisan fleet defeats the Arabs.
- Summer–Autumn – Danish Viking raiders led by Sweyn Forkbeard raid south-eastern England from the Isle of Wight to Reading in the Thames Valley where they overwinter at the Wallingford river crossing.
- Brian Boru visits Ulster, and remains unchallenged.

==== Oceania ====
- A major eruption of the Mount Merapi volcano on Java causes devastation throughout the centre of the island (which it covers with volcanic ash) and to the Javanese Hindu Mataram kingdom.

=== By topic ===
==== Astronomy ====
- April 30 – The brightest supernova ever recorded, SN 1006, occurs in the constellation of Lupus. It is observed and described in China, Japan, Iraq, Egypt, and Europe and possibly depicted in North American rock art. Modern astronomers now consider its distance at about 7,200 light-years. The supernova provides enough light to read by on a night with a dark moon.

== Births ==
- October 23 – Wen Yanbo, grand chancellor (d. 1097)
- Al-Lakhmi, Fatimid scholar and jurist (d. 1085)
- Constantine X, Byzantine emperor (d. 1067)
- Ísleifur Gissurarson, Icelandic bishop (d. 1080)
- Khwaja Abdullah Ansari, Persian Sufi poet (d. 1088)

== Deaths ==
- February 13 – Fulcran, bishop of Lodève (France)
- July 21 – Gisela of Burgundy, duchess of Bavaria
- December 26 – Gao Qiong, Chinese general (b. 935)
- Ælfhelm of York, ealdorman (dux) of Northumbria
- Azon the Venerable (or Atso), French prelate
- Fiachra Ua Focarta, abbot of Clonfert (Ireland)
- Giovanni Orseolo, Venetian nobleman (b. 981)
- Ibn Marzuban, Persian official and physician
- Maud of Normandy, French noblewoman
- Olaf the Peacock, Icelandic merchant
- Sherira Gaon, Jewish spiritual leader
- Cenwulf, bishop of Winchester (approximate date)
