= Nicodemus of Palermo =

St. Nicodemus of Palermo (died 1083) was a Sicilian Eastern Orthodox bishop at a time when Sicily was under Muslim rule.

== History ==
The early Orthodox church of Sicily was Byzantine and part of the Patriarchate of Constantinople. Under Muslim rule, from around 827 until the 1060s, Christians in Sicily, like Jews, became a subjugated people, mildly persecuted and highly taxed but allowed, in most cases, to practice their religion and professions. In Palermo alone there were twenty Orthodox Churches. Nicodemus was appointed bishop in 1065, based out of the Byzantine Church of Santa Domenica Kuriacia in Monreale.

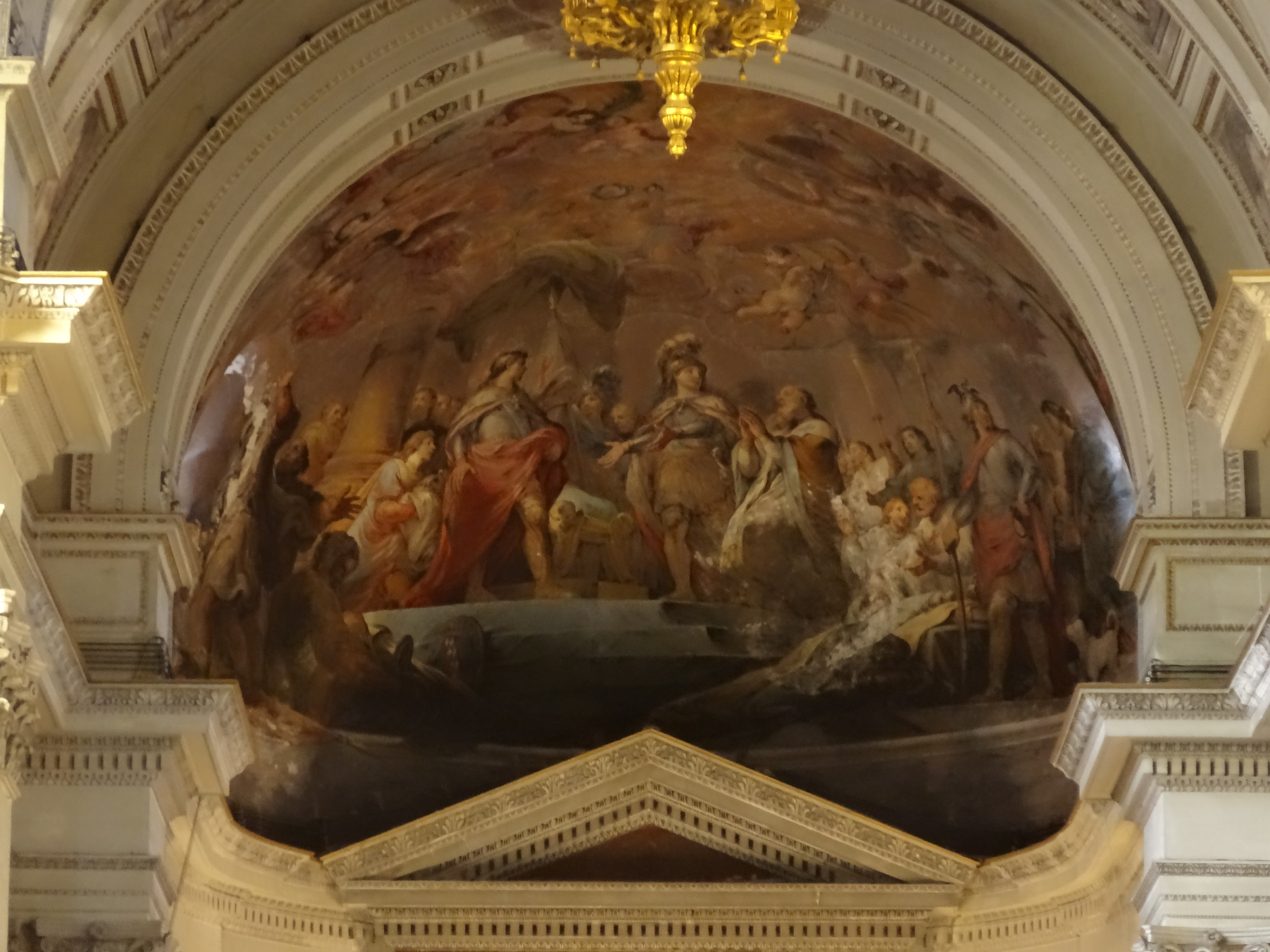
Robert Guiscard and Roger I return the Church to Bishop Nicodemus, Palermo Cathedral

In 1072, he celebrated the entry of Roger I of Sicily to Palermo and the end of the Muslim rule over the city. Nicodemus was confirmed as bishop by Pope Alexander II. The old Church of Saint Mary, which had been turned into a mosque some two hundred and forty years earlier, was reconsecrated and Nicodemus celebrated a Divine Liturgy there.

The new rulers, after establishing their position, sent him to live outside the city in the area now called Mezzomonreale. Because of his fidelity to the Eastern Orthodox Church, he was sent from Palermo. The new political power preferred a Latin bishop.

Nicodemus died in 1083. His body is buried in a stone sarcophagus in the crypt of the Norman era Palermo Cathedral.

Established on 5 May 2002, the Cross of Merit of Saint Nicodemus, Orthodox Bishop of Palermo, was instituted by his successor Lorenzo, Metropolitan of the Ukrainian Autocephalous Orthodox Church - Abroad and Archbishop of Palermo and All Italy, as an award of merit for those who serve the Church in Palermo or who are benefactors of that Church. It is awarded as a meritorious cross by the Confraternity of the Knights of the Most Holy Trinity, of which Archbishop Lorenzo is Grand Master.
