= Sack of Rome (1084) =

Norman forces sack Rome

Date	May 1084
Location	Rome, Italy
Result	Italo-Norman victory

Belligerents
Holy Roman Empire	County of Apulia and Calabria

Commanders and leaders
Henry IV, Holy Roman Emperor	Robert Guiscard

In May 1084, Italo-Normans sacked Rome, the result of the Pope Gregory VII's call for aid from the duke of Apulia, Robert Guiscard. The pope had been besieged in the Castel Sant'Angelo by Henry IV, Holy Roman Emperor, in June 1083 and called for aid from Guiscard, who was then fighting the Byzantine Emperor Alexios I Komnenos in the Balkans. Guiscard then returned to the Italian Peninsula and marched north with 36,000 men.

When Guiscard entered Rome, he forced Henry to retreat, but a riot of the citizens led to a three-day sack by his men, after which Guiscard escorted the pope to the Lateran. The Normans had mainly pillaged the old city, which was then one of the richest cities in Italy. After days of unending violence, the Romans rose up and caused the Normans to set fire to the city. Many of the buildings of Rome were gutted on the Capitoline and Palatine Hills along with the area between the Colosseum and the Lateran. In the end, the ravaged Roman populace succumbed to the Normans.

== See also ==
- Italo-Normans
- History of Rome
