= Sigwin von Are =

Sigwin von Are (died 31 May 1089), called the Pious, was Archbishop of Cologne from 1078 to his death.

He was a deacon in Cologne in 1076. Appointed archbishop by the Emperor Henry IV, he remained a staunch supporter of Henry throughout the Investiture Controversy. He proclaimed the Peace of God in 1083, only the second bishop in Germany. He rebuilt the church of Santa Maria in Cologne after it burned down in 1085. On 30 May 1087, he crowned Henry's son Conrad King of Germany in Aachen.

He died in Cologne and is buried in Cologne Cathedral. Shortly after his death, he was being called "Sigwin the Pious."

== Sources ==
- Oedinger, Friedrich Wilhelm (1972). Geschichte des Erzbistums (in German). Köln.

Preceded by Hildholf	Archbishop of Cologne; 1078–1089	Succeeded by Herman III
