= Herlewin =

English ascetic writer

Ethelmaer, Elmer, or Aelmer (died 1137), also called Herlewin, was an English ascetic writer.

Ethelmaer was made prior of Christ Church, Canterbury, in 1128, and is said to have been a man of great piety and simplicity. His simplicity led him to take the part of Archbishop William of Corbeuil in a dispute he had with the convent in 1136 about the church of St. Martin at Dover. He died 11 May 1137.

The name Elmer is evidently a corruption of the old English name Æthelmær. Leland saw two works by him, a book of homilies and a treatise, ‘De exercitiis spiritualis vitæ.’ The report on the Cottonian Library has under Otho A. xii. ‘Ælmeri monachi ecclesiæ Christi Cantuariensis epistolæ, in quibus tractat de munditia cordis, . . . et querimonia de absentia metus Dei. Liber asceticus et vere pius;’ 100 f. This manuscript was almost entirely destroyed by the fire of 10 July 1865; the few charred fragments that remain form the seventh portion of a volume, marked as above, which begins with some fragments of a manuscript of Asser, the only contents noticed in the Museum catalogue. Another copy is in the library of Trinity College, Cambridge, Gale MS. O. 10, 16 (Wright). The titles of other works are given by Bale.
