= Berthold of Reichenau =

German Benedictine monk and chronicler (died c. 1088)

Berthold of Reichenau (died probably in 1088) was a Benedictine monk and chronicler of Reichenau Abbey.

== Life ==
Berthold was a disciple and friend of Hermannus Contractus. When Hermannus saw death approaching, he entrusted to Berthold all the wax tablets that contained the writings which he had not yet committed to parchment and commissioned Berthold to peruse them and, after careful revision, to copy them on parchment. Berthold was also exhorted by his dying master to continue the chronicle, begun by Hermann, which in chronological order related the history of the world from the birth of Christ to 1054, the year in which Hermann died. Berthold's works comprise this chronicle and a biography of Hermannus.

Bernold remarks in his chronicle under the year 1088 that Berthold, an excellent teacher who was very well versed in Holy Scripture, died at an advanced age on 12 March.

== Works ==
The chronicle, as far as it was written by Berthold, is a concise and impartial history of the troublesome times immediately preceding the accession of Pope Gregory VII, and (probably) also of Gregory's early reign. It is reprinted to the year 1080, with an introduction by Pertz, in Monumenta Germaniae Historica: Scriptores V, 264–326, and in Patrologia Latina, CXLVII, 314–442. Pertz contends that Berthold did not begin the continuation of Hermann's chronicle until 1076, and that in the execution of it he made use of another chronicle, written by Bernold, who was also a monk at Reichenau; but it has been proved almost beyond doubt by Giesebrecht and Schulzen that Berthold was the first to continue Hermann's chronicle and that Bernold's chronicle is a continuation of Berthold's. It is, however, still undecided as to what year Berthold's chronicle extends. Ussermann and Schulzen hold that it extends only to the year 1066, while Pertz, Giesebrecht, and others believe that Berthold wrote the chronicle at least to the middle of the year 1080, where the manuscript suddenly ceases in the middle of a sentence.

The original text of Berthold is no longer in existence and all the existing copies have been compiled from various manuscripts found in the monasteries of St. Gall, St. Blaise, Muri, and Engelberg. The chronicle was continued by Bernold to the year 1100, and by others to the year 1175.

From various passages in Berthold's chronicle it appears that, for a short time at least, he considered Cadalus, Bishop of Parma, as the legitimate occupant of the papal throne; but from the year 1070, or even earlier, he acknowledged Pope Alexander II as the true pope.
