= 1157 =

1157 in various calendars
- Gregorian calendar: 1157; MCLVII
- Ab urbe condita: 1910
- Armenian calendar: 606; ԹՎ ՈԶ
- Assyrian calendar: 5907
- Balinese saka calendar: 1078–1079
- Bengali calendar: 563–564
- Berber calendar: 2107
- English Regnal year: 3 Hen. 2 – 4 Hen. 2
- Buddhist calendar: 1701
- Burmese calendar: 519
- Byzantine calendar: 6665–6666
- Chinese calendar: 丙子年 (Fire Rat); 3854 or 3647 — to — 丁丑年 (Fire Ox); 3855 or 3648
- Coptic calendar: 873–874
- Discordian calendar: 2323
- Ethiopian calendar: 1149–1150
- Hebrew calendar: 4917–4918
- Hindu calendars
- Vikram Samvat: 1213–1214
- Shaka Samvat: 1078–1079
- Kali Yuga: 4257–4258
- Holocene calendar: 11157
- Igbo calendar: 157–158
- Iranian calendar: 535–536
- Islamic calendar: 551–552
- Japanese calendar: Hōgen 2 (保元２年)
- Javanese calendar: 1063–1064
- Julian calendar: 1157; MCLVII
- Korean calendar: 3490
- Minguo calendar: 755 before ROC 民前755年
- Nanakshahi calendar: −311
- Seleucid era: 1468/1469 AG
- Thai solar calendar: 1699–1700
- Tibetan calendar: མེ་ཕོ་བྱི་བ་ལོ་ (male Fire-Rat); 1283 or 902 or 130 — to — མེ་མོ་གླང་ལོ་ (female Fire-Ox); 1284 or 903 or 131

Year 1157 (MCLVII) was a common year starting on Tuesday of the Julian calendar.

== Events ==
- January 12–March 16 – Caliph Al-Muqtafi successfully defends Baghdad against the coalition forces of Sultan Muhammad of Hamadan, and Atabeg Qutb-adin of Mosul.
- Albert I of Brandenburg begins his ruthless program to pacify the Slavic region.
- June 11 – Albert the Bear (Ger: Albrecht der Bär), becomes the founder of the Margraviate of Brandenburg, Germany and the first Margrave.
- July – Henry II launches a campaign against Owain Gwynedd in north Wales. Although Owain defeats him at the Battle of Ewloe he eventually submits to Henry and pays homage.
- August 12 – The 1157 Hama earthquake takes place after a year of foreshocks. Its name is taken from the city of Hama, in west-central Syria (then under Seljuk rule), where the most casualties are sustained.
- August 21 – Sancho III and Ferdinand II, the sons of King Alfonso VII of Castile, divide his kingdom between them upon his death.
- October 23 – Battle of Grathe Heath: A civil war in Denmark ends with the death of King Sweyn III. Valdemar I of Denmark becomes king of all Denmark, and restores and rebuilds the country.
- Henry II of England grants special trading privileges to the Hansa merchants of Cologne in London who lend him money at interest.
- Henry II of England grants a charter to the merchants of Lincoln (approximate date).
- Nur al-Din Zengi besieges the Knights Hospitaller in the crusader fortress of Banyas, routs a relief army led by King Baldwin III of Jerusalem, and takes Grand Master Bertrand de Blanquefort prisoner.

== Births ==
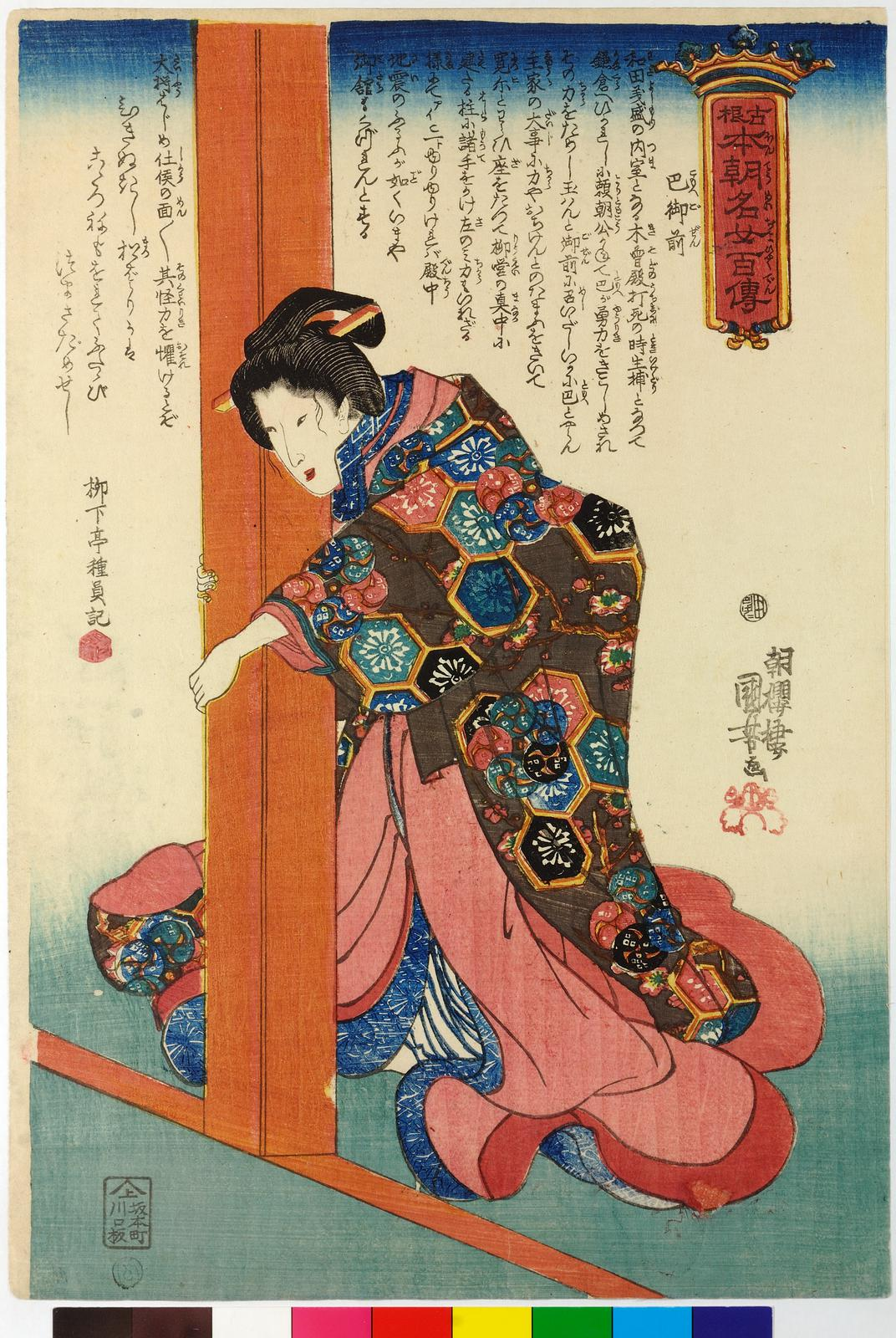
Tomoe Gozen

- September 8 – King Richard I of England (d. 1199)
- Alexander Neckham, English scholar, teacher, theologian and abbot of Cirencester Abbey (d. 1217)
- Leopold V of Austria, Duke of Austria from 1177 and Duke of Styria from 1192 until his death (d. 1194)
- Margaret of France, Queen of England and Hungary, Queen of England by marriage to Henry the Young King and queen of Hungary and Croatia by marriage to Béla III of Hungary (d. 1197)
- Tomoe Gozen, female Samurai warrior and military leader (d. 1247)

== Deaths ==
- January 24 or January 25 – Agnes of Babenberg, Politically active High Duchess consort of Poland (b. 1111)
- May 8 – Ahmed Sanjar, Great Seljuk Sultan (b. 1084 or 1086)
- May 15 – Yury Dolgoruky, Russian prince (b. c. 1099)
- August 21 – King Alfonso VII of Castile (b. 1105)
- October 23 – King Sweyn III of Denmark (b.c. 1125) (in battle)
- date unknown – King Eystein II of Norway (b.c. 1125)
