= 1151 =

1151 in various calendars
- Gregorian calendar: 1151; MCLI
- Ab urbe condita: 1904
- Armenian calendar: 600; ԹՎ Ո
- Assyrian calendar: 5901
- Balinese saka calendar: 1072–1073
- Bengali calendar: 557–558
- Berber calendar: 2101
- English Regnal year: 16 Ste. 1 – 17 Ste. 1
- Buddhist calendar: 1695
- Burmese calendar: 513
- Byzantine calendar: 6659–6660
- Chinese calendar: 庚午年 (Metal Horse); 3848 or 3641 — to — 辛未年 (Metal Goat); 3849 or 3642
- Coptic calendar: 867–868
- Discordian calendar: 2317
- Ethiopian calendar: 1143–1144
- Hebrew calendar: 4911–4912
- Hindu calendars
- Vikram Samvat: 1207–1208
- Shaka Samvat: 1072–1073
- Kali Yuga: 4251–4252
- Holocene calendar: 11151
- Igbo calendar: 151–152
- Iranian calendar: 529–530
- Islamic calendar: 545–546
- Japanese calendar: Kyūan 7 / Ninpei 1 (仁平元年)
- Javanese calendar: 1057–1058
- Julian calendar: 1151; MCLI
- Korean calendar: 3484
- Minguo calendar: 761 before ROC 民前761年
- Nanakshahi calendar: −317
- Seleucid era: 1462/1463 AG
- Thai solar calendar: 1693–1694
- Tibetan calendar: ལྕགས་ཕོ་རྟ་ལོ་ (male Iron-Horse); 1277 or 896 or 124 — to — ལྕགས་མོ་ལུག་ལོ་ (female Iron-Sheep); 1278 or 897 or 125

Year 1151 (MCLI) was a common year starting on Monday of the Julian calendar.

== Events ==
- September 7 – Geoffrey of Anjou dies, and is succeeded by his son Henry, aged 18.
- After the Battle of Ghazni, the city is burned by the Prince of Ghur.
- The first plague and fire insurance policy is issued in Iceland.
- Bolton Abbey is founded in North Yorkshire, England.
- Anping Bridge is completed in China's Fujian province. Its total length will not be exceeded until 1846.
- Confronted with internal strife, the commune of Bologna is the first Italian republic to turn to the rule of a podestà, Guido di Ranieri da Sasso (it ends in 1155).

== Births ==
- April 3 – Igor Svyatoslavich, Russian prince (d. 1202)
- May 9 – al-Adid, last Fatimid caliph (d. 1171)
- Unkei, Japanese sculptor (d. 1223)

== Deaths ==
- January 13 – Abbot Suger, French statesman and historian (b. c. 1081)
- April 23 – Adeliza of Louvain, queen of Henry I of England (b. 1103)
- September 7 – Geoffrey V, Count of Anjou (b. 1113)
- Li Qingzhao, Chinese poet (b. 1084)
