= 1088 Tmogvi earthquake =

Strong earthquake in Georgia

- Location within Georgia
- Local date: April 16, 1088
- Magnitude: 6.5 M_{s}
- Depth: 15 km (9.3 mi)
- Epicenter: 41.4°N 43.2°E
- Areas affected: Georgia
- Total damage: Severe
- Casualties: Many

The 1088 Tmogvi earthquake (Georgian: თმოგვის მიწისძვრა) occurred on April 16 or April 22, (Note: Modern catalogues (Balassanian et al 2000) indicate the date of the earthquake as April 22. Orthodox Easter of 1088 falls on April 16 on the Julian calendar (Vivian 1991).) 1088, on Easter Sunday, in the southern provinces of the Kingdom of Georgia. It takes its name from the castle of Tmogvi, in Javakheti, whose destruction is specifically noted in the medieval annals of Georgia. Its magnitude is estimated as 6.5 on the surface-wave magnitude scale.

== History ==
The Tmogvi earthquake was one of the largest recorded earthquakes in the history of Georgia, and was associated with the active faults of the Javakheti Plateau in the Lesser Caucasus.

According to the anonymous 12th-century Life of King of Kings David, the earthquake shook Georgia on the "last day of Holy Week, on the very resurrection of our Lord Jesus Christ". The chronicle reports widespread destruction and many casualties and adds that "fearsome trembling of the earth lasted for a year". The author specifically notes the collapse of the castle of Tmogvi, trapping its lord Kakhaber, son of Niania, and his wife underneath.

== See also ==
- List of earthquakes in Georgia
- List of historical earthquakes
