= William the Walloon =

William the Walloon (date of birth unknown; d. (probably) 22 December 1089) was a Benedictine Abbot who served as the head of St. Arnoul at Metz in 1050. In 1073, he was elected as the Abbot of St-Remi, but faced persecution from the Archbishop of Reims and eventually resigned, returning to St-Arnoul. Twelve years later, in 1085, William allowed himself to be consecrated and took on the role of bishop in the See of Metz, but resigned and retired to the Abbey of Gorze the following year. He was later restored to his position at St-Arnoul by Bishop Herimann.

William left behind several written works, including seven letters and a prayer of preparation for Mass in honor of St. Augustine. These writings demonstrate his extensive knowledge of literature and include a well-known address of congratulations to Pope Gregory VII on his election to the papacy.

== Life ==
He became Abbot of St. Arnoul at Metz in 1050. He continued the good traditions of his predecessor, Abbot Warin, in the government of his monastery, and devoted his leisure to study, especially of the works of St. Jerome and Augustine of Hippo.

On 30 June 1073, Pope Gregory VII wrote to Archbishop Manasses of Reims, rebuking him for his ill treatment of the monks of St-Remi, and ordering him to procure the election of a suitable abbot. William of St-Anoul was elected, but quickly found his position untenable. In spite of promises made to William in person (see his fourth letter), Manasses continued his persecution, and towards the end of 1073, the abbot journeyed to Rome to secure the acceptance of his resignation. In a letter to Manasses, probably sent by William, the pope says that the abbot is very pleasing to him and that he would desire him to retain both abbacies, but that, if he persists in resigning St-Remi, the archbishop is to accept his resignation and seek his advice in the election of a successor. In another letter, to Bishop Herimann of Metz, he informs him that William wishes to return to St-Arnoul, and recommends him to the bishop's charity, "that he may feel that his coming to us has profited him." In the event, Manasses roughly demanded the return of the abbatial crosier and appointed Henry, Abbot of Homblières, in William's place, apparently without consulting him.

William returned to Metz, but some twelve years later, though on friendly terms with Bishop Herimann, allowed himself to be consecrated and intruded into the See of Metz when the Emperor Henry IV drove out the rightful bishop, in 1085. The following year, however, he sought out Herimann, publicly resigned the dignity he had usurped, and retired to the Abbey of Gorze. Shortly afterwards Herimann restored him to his abbey of St-Arnoul.

== Works ==
Of his writings, have seven letters and a prayer of preparation for Mass in honour of St. Augustine have survived to this date. His style is good for the period and shows a considerable knowledge of literature. The first letter is the well-known address of congratulation to Gregory VII on his election to the papacy, reprinted by the Bollandists at the beginning of their commentary on the life of that pope. These remains were discovered by Mabillon at St-Arnoul and first printed by him in his "Analecta vetera", I (Paris, 1675), 247-286.
