= Durandus of Troarn =

Durandus of Troarn was a French Benedictine and ecclesiastical writer, b. about 1012, at Le Neubourg near Evreux; d. 1089, at Troarn near Caen).

Affiliated from early childhood to the Benedictine community of Mont-Sainte-Cathérine and of Saint-Vandrille, he was made abbot of the newly founded Saint-Martin of Troarn by William, Duke of Normandy, in whose esteem he stood on a par with Lanfranc, Anselm, and Gerbert of Saint-Wandrille.

Ordericus Vitalis calls him ecclesiastici cantus et dogmatis doctor peritissimus. Of his achievements in sacred music we know nothing beyond that mention, but we have his Liber de Corpore et Sanguine Domini against Berengarius. The ninth and last part of it contains precious historical information about the heresiarch. In Durandus's mind Berengarius is a figurist pure and simple, after the manner of Scotus Eriugena, whose now lost book he is said to have possessed and used. In the rest of his book Durandus follows Paschasius Radbertus, whom he somewhat emphatically styles Divini sacramenti scrutator diligentissimus discussorque catholicus, and from whom he borrows both his patristic apparatus and his theological views. Joseph Turmel, however, notes that Durandus quotes new texts of Bede, Amalarius, Fulbert de Chartres, and St. John Chrysostom.

His presentation of the Eucharistic dogma is frankly Ambrosian, i.e., he maintains with Paschasius and Gerbert the conversion of the bread and wine into the identical body and blood of Christ, thus excluding the Augustinian theory of the Praesentia spiritalis still held by some of his contemporaries and contributing to prepare the definition of the Fourth Lateran Council (1215).

Durandus explains with skill the Augustinian texts, chiefly in the De doctrinâ christianâ and the Letter to Boniface, misused by Berengarius; but in the last analysis he appeals to the argument of authority already used by Guitmond: "The saintly Doctor of Hippo, wearied by the labours of composition, fails at times to clearly bring out his thought. Hence he may appear obscure to the unlearned and even become a source of error. If perchance he should have erred in so great a mystery, we should then bethink ourselves of the Apostolic saying: 'But though an angel from heaven preach a gospel to you besides that which you have received, let him be anathema'".

Durandus wrote also against Berengarius a poem of 900 verses, of which twenty-five preface the above treatise and thirteen are quoted in Mabillon's Annales (LXIV, 119), the rest being unpublished. Migne appends to the Liber two epitaphs composed by Durandus, one for Abbot Ainard and the other for the Countess Mabile.
