= Pontificate =

Form of government in Vatican City

The pontificate is the form of government used in Vatican City. The word came to English from French and simply means papacy, or "to perform the functions of the Pope or other high official in the Church". Since there is only one bishop of Rome, or pope, pontificate is sometimes also used to describe the reign of a particular pope. It must not be confused with the Holy See, which since ancient times referred to the episcopal see of Rome, while the pontificate in the Vatican City is "the type of government used there" and is neither a kingdom nor a republic.

== See also ==
- Christian state
- Sacerdotal state
