= 1090s =

Decade

The 1090s was a decade of the Julian Calendar which began on January 1, 1090, and ended on December 31, 1099.

== Events ==
=== 1090 ===
==== By place ====
====== Europe ======
- A third Almoravid expedition is launched in Al-Andalus, designed to finally subdue the Taifa's Kingdoms. The cities of Córdoba, Seville, Granada, Málaga, Almería and Ronda fall to the troops of Sultan Yusuf ibn Tashfin.
- King Stephen II of Croatia becomes involved in an open conflict between factions of the Croatian nobility, who reassert their traditional rights in their own counties.

====== Seljuk Empire ======
- Hassan-i Sabbah founds the Nizari Ismaili state after taking control of the Alamut Castle and organising the military group called the Order of Assassins.

====== Africa ======
- Béjaïa (or Bugia) becomes the capital of the Hammadid dynasty in modern-day Algeria. It becomes an important port and centre of culture.

==== By topic ====
====== Arts and Culture ======
- Troubadours begin playing in western Aquitaine (Poitou and Saintonge) and Gascony (approximate date).

====== Science and Technology ======
- Qin Guan, Chinese poet of the Song dynasty, writes the Can Shu (Book of Sericulture), which describes a silk-reeling machine that has the world's oldest known mechanical belt drive.

=== 1091 ===
==== By place ====
====== Byzantine Empire ======
- Spring – Tzachas, a Seljuk Turkish military commander, establishes an independent maritime state centred in the Ionian coastal city of Smyrna (modern-day İzmir). He proclaims himself emperor (basileus), and concludes an alliance with the Pechenegs in Thrace. Tzachas uses his fleet to blockade Constantinople by sea, while the Pechenegs besiege the capital by land.
- April 29 – Battle of Levounion: Emperor Alexios I, supported by his allies, defeats 80,000 of Pechenegs (including women and children) at the Evros River, near Enos (modern Turkey). The Cumans and Byzantine forces fall upon the enemy camp, slaughtering all in their path. The Pechenegs are butchered so savagely, that this people is almost wiped out.

====== Europe ======
- Spring – King Stephen II, the last member of the Trpimirović dynasty, dies without leaving an heir after a 2-year reign. War and unrest breaks out in Croatia afterwards. King Ladislaus I of Hungary, on instigation of his sister, Queen Helena, intervenes in the conflict and occupies Croatia. He proclaims himself king, but is contested by the Croatian nobleman Petar Snačić.
- February – Norman conquest of Sicily: The Normans conquer Noto and complete the 30-year-long conquest of Sicily from the Moorish rulers. Duke Roger Borsa (a son of Robert Guiscard) surrenders his share in the castles of Calabria, and receives his inheritance of Palermo. He grants charters to various towns and encourages urban planning in Apulia and Calabria.
- Summer – The Norman invasion of Malta: A Norman fleet led by Count Roger I of Sicily ("Bosso") arrives in Malta. Roger disembarks his army, and besieges the island's capital Medina (modern-day Mdina). The inhabitants negotiate peace terms (by promising to pay an annual tribute) and swear an oath of loyalty to Roger. On the way back, the Normans sack the island Gozo.
- July – The Abbadid dynasty ruling in Al-Andalus (modern Spain) falls when Almoravid forces storm Seville. Confronted with this threat, Emir Muhammad ibn Abu Bakr Muhammad al-Aftas of Badajoz obtains the support of King Alfonso VI ("the Brave") of Castile, in exchange for the Moorish positions on the river Tagus (Sintra, Santarém and Lisbon).

====== Britain and France ======
- February 2 – King William II of England invades western Normandy with a large army. His brothers, Henry and Robert Curthose, mobilize mercenary forces to resist him during a siege at Mont-Saint-Michel. Under terms of the Treaty of Caen, estates on the Cotentin Peninsula of Normandy are surrendered to William, matters being concluded in August.
- July – King Malcolm III of Scotland invades England, reaching as far south as Durham. The Normans led by William II and Robert march north to oppose the Scots, but a conflict is averted. Malcolm is forced to accept the terms of the Treaty of Abernethy (1072) and pays homage to William.
- Cardiff Castle in Wales is constructed by Robert Fitzhamon, Norman lord of Gloucester (approximate date).

==== By topic ====
====== Disasters ======
- October 17 – London tornado: A T8 tornado (roughly equal to an F4 on the Fujita scale) occurs in London. The wooden London Bridge is demolished and the church of St. Mary-le-Bow is badly damaged.

====== Religion ======
- December – Athanasius VI bar Khamoro becomes (against his will) patriarch and head of the Syriac Orthodox Church in Antioch (until 1129).

=== 1092 ===
==== By place ====
====== Byzantine Empire ======
- Summer – Emperor Alexios I Komnenos bribes one of Kilij Arslan's (sultan of the Sultanate of Rum) officials to recover Sinope (the capital of Paphlagonia), and neighbouring coastal regions. He uses the Byzantine fleet to defeat the Seljuk navy off the coast of Cius in Bithynia.

====== Europe ======
- January 14 – Vratislaus II, the first king of Bohemia, dies after a 6½-year reign and is succeeded by his brother Conrad I who becomes duke and not king because Vratislaus was elevated to the royal dignity 'for life' by Henry IV, Holy Roman Emperor (in 1085). Conrad dies September 6 after a 8-month reign and is succeeded by his nephew Bretislav II (the eldest son of Vratislaus).

====== Britain ======
- Summer – King William II annexes Cumbria from the Scottish Celtic kingdom of Strathclyde, and builds Carlisle Castle.
- May 11 – Lincoln Cathedral, one of England's finest Gothic buildings, is consecrated.

====== Seljuk Empire ======
- November 19 – Sultan Malik-Shah I dies after a 20-year reign while hunting. The Seljuk Empire falls into chaos: his brother Tutush I and rival successors carve up their own independent sultanates in the Middle East. Malik-Shah is succeeded by his son Mahmud I, but he does not gain control of the empire.

====== China ======
- Su Song, a Chinese statesman and scientist, publishes his Xin Yi Xiang Fa Yao, a treatise outlining the construction and operation of his complex astronomical clocktower, built in Kaifeng. It also includes a celestial atlas of five star maps.

==== By topic ====
====== Religion ======
- April 21 – The Diocese of Pisa is elevated to the dignity of a metropolitan archdiocese by Pope Urban II.
- May 21 – Synod of Szabolcs: King Ladislaus I of Hungary assembles a council of the prelates of his kingdom at the fortress of Szabolcs.

=== 1093 ===
==== By place ====
====== Europe ======
- April 13 –The Grand Prince of Kiev Vsevolod I Yaroslavich dies, after a 15-year reign. He is succeeded by Sviatopolk II, who is acknowledged by other princes as the senior son of Iziaslav I, and ascends the Kievan throne as ruler of the Kievan Rus'. His cousin Vladimir II, prince of Chernigov, becomes a bitter rival.
- May 26 – Battle of the Stugna River: The nomadic Cumans defeat a Kievan joint force led by the princes of Kievan Rus' at the Stuhna River in the valley near Trepol. Rostislav Vsevolodovich, prince of Pereyaslavl, drowns while fleeing the battle.
- September 22 – King Olaf III of Norway ("the Peaceful") dies after a 26-year reign. He is succeeded by his son Magnus Barefoot who is proclaimed ruler of Norway at the Borgarting (or the Thing), an assembly of lawspeakers, in the region of Viken.

====== Britain ======
- March 6 – Anselm, Italian Benedictine abbot and theologian, becomes archbishop of Canterbury in England, succeeding Lanfranc. The post of archbishop has been left vacant since 1089 by King William II of England – so he can collect the church's income for himself.
- November 13 – Battle of Alnwick: King Malcolm III of Scotland invades Northumberland, but is killed by English forces under Earl Robert de Mowbray while besieging Alnwick Castle. He is succeeded by his brother Donald III ("the Fair") as ruler of Scotland.
- The Normans under Lord Robert Fitzhamon continue their occupation of southern Wales with Pembroke Castle being constructed by Arnulf de Montgomery.

==== By topic ====
====== Religion ======
- April 8 – Monks move into the new Winchester Cathedral in England, constructed by the Norman bishop Walkelin.
- August 11 – Construction of Durham Cathedral in England begins, replacing the Saxon 'White Church'.

=== 1094 ===
==== By place ====
====== Byzantine Empire ======
- Spring – Emperor Alexios I Komnenos sends a Byzantine expeditionary force under General Tatikios to Nicaea, in an attempt to re-capture the city from the Seljuk Turks. However, the arrival of Barkiyaruq's army en route stops the Byzantines. Alexios sends reinforcements; short of supplies, the Seljuk Turks retreat. Abu'l-Qasim, Seljuk governor of Nicaea, is defeated and forced to conclude a truce with Alexios.

====== Europe ======
- May – El Cid (Rodrigo Diaz de Vivar) completes his conquest of Valencia in Al-Andalus (modern Spain) and begins his rule (in the name of King Alfonso VI) there. The Almoravid campaign to regain the city fails.
- May–June – Duncan, son of the late King Malcolm III of Scotland, gathers a substantial army, chiefly Anglo-Normans from England, and challenges his uncle Donald III ("the Fair") for the Kingdom of Scotland. Duncan is crowned king at Scone.
- July 28 – William Bertrand dies, and his margravial title of Provence is inherited by Raymond IV ("Saint-Gilles"), who becomes count of Toulouse (until 1105).
- November 12 – Donald III mobilizes his army and kills Duncan II in battle in the Scottish Lowlands, re-taking the Scottish throne.

====== Fatimid Egypt ======
- After the death of Caliph al-Mustansir Billah, his son-in-law and vizier Al-Afdal declares al-Musta'li, a younger son of al-Mustansir, in a coup d'état as new Caliph. Al-Mustansir's designated heir, Nizar, flees to Alexandria.

====== Eastern Islamic world ======
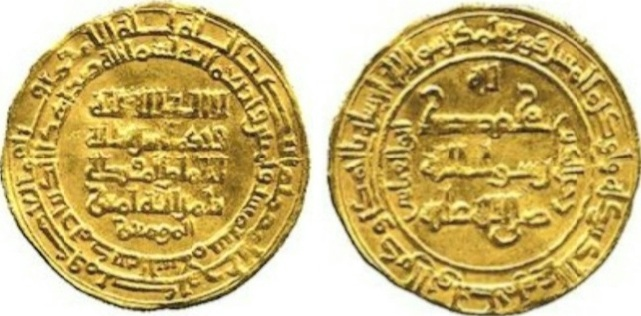
Gold dinar of al-Muqtadi mint at Baghdad

- February 3 – Caliph of Baghdad al-Muqtadi dies and is succeeded by his nominated heir Ahmad (al-Mustazhir).
- October – Seljuk sultan Mahmud I dies after a 2-year reign. He is succeeded by his brother Barkiyaruq (one of the Seljuk princes who claim the throne) as ruler of the Seljuk Empire.

==== By topic ====
====== Religion ======
- May 15 – The Cathedral of St. Agatha in Catania (Sicily) is consecrated by the Breton abbot Ansger.
- October 8 – Doge Vitale Faliero consecrates the new Basilica of San Marco in Venice.
- King Ladislaus I of Hungary founds a diocese (alongside the bishop's see) in Zagreb.
- Al-Musta'li becomes the nineteenth imam of Musta'li Ismailism

=== 1095 ===
==== By place ====
====== Byzantine Empire ======
- March – Emperor Alexios I Komnenos send envoys to Pope Urban II at the Council of Piacenza and appeals to the Christian states of Western Europe for military aid against the Seljuk Turks. Urban responds favourably, hoping to heal the Great Schism of 40 years earlier, and to reunite the Catholic Church under papal primacy by helping the Eastern churches.
- Summer – The nomadic Cumans cross the River Danube and invade Thrace, to support the pretender Constantine Diogenes (son of the late Emperor Romanos IV). The Cumans occupy the province of Paristrion (located in the Lower Danube). Emperor Alexios I places Byzantine detachments to guard the passes over the Balkan Mountains, but they are bypassed.

====== Europe ======
- The Second County of Portugal is established by Count Henry of Burgundy. The Almoravids start pushing back the forces of King Alfonso VI ("the Brave") to the positions they occupied a decade earlier. This offensive begins with the re-conquest of Lisbon, which had been given away to Castile in 1091.
- July – Coloman ("the Learned") begins to establish himself as ruler of Hungary, following the death of his uncle, King Ladislaus I (until 1116).
- August 18 – Olaf I of Denmark ("Hunger") dies after a 9-year reign. He is succeeded by his brother Eric I ("the Good") as king of Denmark.

====== England ======
- January – After attacking four Norwegian merchant ships lying in the River Tyne, Robert de Mowbray, earl of Northumberland, is called for by King William II of England to explain his actions. Instead, Mowbray rises up in rebellion against William along with other Norman nobles. William leads an army and besieges Bamburgh Castle; de Mowbray is captured after fleeing the stronghold.

==== Fatimid Empire ====
- The rebellion of Nizar is squashed by al-Afdal. Nizar is immured and his death results in a schism of Ismaili Shia. While Shiites in Egypt, Yemen and parts of Syria remain loyal to the new caliph, Al-Musta'li, the Persian and many other Eastern Shiites under Hasan-i Sabbah break away in the newly formed Nizari Ismaili state.

==== By topic ====
====== Religion ======
- November 18 – The Council of Clermont begins. The synod is called by Pope Urban II to discuss sending the First Crusade to the Holy Land.
- November 27 – Urban II preaches the First Crusade at the Council of Clermont; Peter the Hermit begins to preach throughout France.
- November 28 – Urban II appoints Bishop Adhemar of Le Puy and Count Raymond IV of Toulouse ("Saint-Gilles"), to lead the First Crusade.
- The Ismaili Shia split into the Musta'li and Nizari branch.
- Valence Cathedral is consecrated in Valence (approximate date).

=== 1096 ===
==== By place ====
====== First Crusade ======
- Spring – Peter the Hermit begins his preaching of the First Crusade, traveling from Berry (in central France) across Champagne, and down the Meuse Valley to Cologne (modern Germany). He gathers the People's Crusade (some 40,000 supporters), which departs about April 20. Peter's speeches appeal not only to nobles and knights, but also laborers, tradesmen and peasants (among them are former brigands and criminals).
- May – The People's Crusade, under Peter the Hermit, arrives at Sopron. Coloman, King of Hungary ("the Learned") gives them permission to pass through Hungary, and to use the markets. Peter and his followers (some 20,000 men and women) travel from Budapest southwards supported by knights, while lumbering wagons carry stores and a chest of money that he has collected for the journey.
- May – The Rhineland massacres: Members of the People's Crusade led by Count Emicho destroy most of the Jewish communities along the Rhine in a series of large pogroms in France and Germany. Thousands of Jews are massacred, driven to suicide, or forced to convert to Christianity. Estimates of the number of Jewish men, women and children murdered are 2,000 to 12,000.
- May 8 – French members of the People's Crusade led by Walter Sans Avoir enter Hungary, without incident they arrive at Semlin, and cross the Sava into Byzantine territory at Belgrade. Meanwhile, Walter demands food but he is refused entry, and the crusaders are forced to pillage the countryside. Eventually Walter is allowed to carry on to Niš, where he is provided with food.
- May 18–26 – The Worms massacre: Members of the People's Crusade under Emicho besiege Worms in the Rhineland before killing at least 800 Jews, despite the intervention of Bishop Adalbert II. He tries to hide some of them in the bishop's palace, others chose to remain outside its walls. One of the victims is Minna of Worms, an influential Jew among the Christian nobility.
- May 27 – Members of the People's Crusade under Emicho massacre at least 1,000 Jews in Mainz. Archbishop Ruthard tries to hide some of them in the cellars of Mainz Cathedral but the crusaders learn of this – and murder most of the Jews. Men, women, and children of all ages are slaughtered indiscriminately.
- May 30 – Members of the People's Crusade led by the priest Folkmar from Saxony persecute Jews in Prague, despite the opposition of the local Catholic hierarchy. Local citizens try to hide them in their own houses. Later the Jews manage to escape to safety in neighboring villages, but are slaughtered by the hundreds.
- June – Members of the People's Crusade under Emicho set out up the Main towards Hungary. Some followers break off from Emicho's army at Mainz and travel to Metz – where many Jews are persecuted and murdered. They proceed down the Rhine, massacring the Jews at Neuss, Wevelinghofen, and Xanten.
- June – The People's Crusade under Emicho are refused entry to Hungary on orders of Coloman, who sends troops to defend the bridge at Wieselburg. Emicho decides to build an alternative bridge and crosses the Danube. He besieges the fortress of Wieselburg, but is defeated and routed by the Hungarian army.
- June – Siege of Semlin: The People's Crusade led by Peter the Hermit arrives at Semlin. Hearing rumors of an attack from the Hungarian count Guz of Semlin on the rearguard, Geoffrey Burel assaults the castle, captures it by surprise, and defeats the Hungarian army. He plunders its supplies, herds and horses.
- June 26 – The People's Crusade (some 30,000 men) led by Peter the Hermit crosses the Sava (stealing boats from the local fishermen) but are attacked by Pechenegs and Hungarian forces. The citizens of Belgrade flee and the crusaders pillage and burn the city. Peter travels for seven days, and arrives at Niš.
- July – The People's Crusade led by Peter the Hermit is defeated by the Byzantine army (mostly Hungarian and Bulgar mercenaries) in battle near Niš. The crusader supply train of some 2,000 wagons and Peter's treasury chest is captured by the Byzantines. About a quarter of the People's Crusade is lost.
- July 12 – The People's Crusade led by Peter the Hermit reaches Sofia, where they meet envoys from Constantinople with orders to keep them supplied along the road. At Philippopolis the Greeks are so deeply moved by the suffering of Peter and his followers that the locals give them money, food and horses.
- August 1 – The People's Crusade led by Peter the Hermit arrives at Constantinople. He is received by Emperor Alexios I Komnenos, who gives him financial support. The crusaders commit endless thefts in the suburbs. Peter combines his forces with Walter Sans Avoir and camps outside Constantinople.
- August 2–6 – The People's Crusade reorganize their forces and gather supplies. Alexios I advises Peter the Hermit to wait for reinforcements but he ignores the advice. The People's army (some 30,000 men) is transported across the Bosporus – by the Byzantine fleet to Civetot (modern Turkey).
- August – Hugh ("the Great"), count of Vermandois (a brother of King Philip I), departs to join the First Crusade. He travels with a small army via the Alps to Rome. While sailing the Adriatic Sea from Bari to Dyrrachium his fleet is reduced by shipwreck. Hugh's own ship is stranded on the shore near Epirus.
- August – Godfrey of Bouillon, duke of Lower Lorraine, accompanied by his younger brother Baldwin, sets off to join the First Crusade (called by Pope Urban II) at the head of an army of some 40,000 men. He pledges his allegiance to Emperor Henry IV who issues an order not to harm Jewish communities.
- September – French forces (7,000 infantry and 300 knights) led by Geoffrey Burel raid around Nicaea (the capital of the Rum Seljuk Turks), plundering livestock and villages in the suburbs. They commit atrocities against local Christian peasants. Children are tortured and dismembered by the crusaders.
- September – German forces (5,000 infantry and 200 knights) led by Rainald of Breis raid the region of Nicaea. They advance eastward and assault the Seljuk garrison in the castle of Xerigordos. They manage to capture; and, find it well stocked with provisions. The Greek Christians inside are spared.
- September 29 – Siege of Xerigordos: Sultan Kilij Arslan I sends a Seljuk expeditionary force to assault and recapture the castle of Xerigordos. They cut off the water supply, and Rainald of Breis is forced to surrender. Many of the crusaders are killed but others convert to Islam and become slaves.
- October – Robert Curthose, duke of Normandy (a brother of King William II of England), sets off to join the First Crusade. He assembles his army at Pontarlier and travels through Italy to Rome. To raise money for the Crusade Robert mortgages the Norman duchy to William, for the sum of 10,000 pennies.
- October – Raymond IV ("Saint-Gilles"), count of Toulouse, sets off to join the First Crusade. He travels with his army, accompanied by his wife Elvira and Bishop Adhemar of Le Puy, via Provence through the Balkan route (along the coast of Croatia). He arrives at Dyrrachium to march to Thessaloniki.
- October – Bohemond I, Italo-Norman prince of Taranto (the son of Duke Robert Guiscard), departs to join the First Crusade. He crosses the Adriatic Sea from Brindisi with his army (some 4,000 men), and arrives in Vorë. While traveling, Bohemond gives strict orders not to plunder Byzantine villages.
- October 21 – Battle of Civetot: The Seljuk Turks led by Kilij Arslan I defeat the People's army (20,000 men) near Nicaea. The crusaders are slaughtered, and the camp at Civetot is captured. Only children are spared and sent into slavery. Around 3,000 manage to escape back to Constantinople.
- December – The last of the four planned Crusader armies arrives at Constantinople, bringing the total numbers to 60,000 infantry and knights. Curiously there isn't a single king among the Crusaders' leaders. At this time Philip I, William II, and Henry IV are all under excommunication by Urban II.
- December 25 – Godfrey of Bouillon is appointed the primary leader of the First Crusade, making it a largely French war in practice and causing the inhabitants of the Holy Land to refer to Europeans generally as "Franks". Godfrey and the other leaders agree to take an oath of loyalty to Alexios I.

====== Europe ======
- King Alfonso VI ("the Brave") of Castile arranges to marry his daughter Theresa to Henry of Burgundy (House of Burgundy). Theresa's dowry includes the County of Portugal, given to Henry with Porto as the capital.
- Reconquista: King Peter I of Aragon conquers Huesca from the Moors of the Taifa of Zaragoza. He expands his domains to the south, conquering land from Al Andalus (modern Spain). The capital is moved from Jaca to Huesca.

====== Asia ======
- Phayao, a modern-day province of Thailand, is founded as a city-state kingdom.

==== By topic ====
====== Religion ======
- February – Robert of Arbrissel founds a monastery at La Roë.
- The first documented teaching at the University of Oxford in England occurs.
- Norwich School is founded in England as an episcopal grammar school.
- In Ireland, the Diocese of Waterford is established.

=== 1097 ===
==== By place ====
====== First Crusade ======
- Spring – The Crusaders under Godfrey of Bouillon attack the Byzantine imperial palace at Blachernae. Norman forces led by Bohemond I join the Crusaders – he is not welcome in Constantinople because his father, Robert Guiscard, has invaded Illyria (territory belonging to the Byzantine Empire), and captured the cities of Dyrrhachium and Corfu (see 1084).
- May 14 – Siege of Nicaea: The Crusaders begin their campaign with the siege of Nicaea (the capital of the Sultanate of Rum), assigning their forces to different sections of the walls, which are well-defended with 200 towers. Towards the end, an advance party of the Seljuk Turks is defeated by troops of Raymond IV, Count of Toulouse ("Saint-Gilles") and Robert II.
- June 19 – The Seljuk Turks surrender Nicaea to the Crusaders after a month siege. The Byzantines occupy the city; their commander Manuel Boutoumites is named by Emperor Alexios I Komnenos as doux of Nicaea. In the consternation the Crusaders are not allowed to plunder the city and are forced (again) to pledge their allegiance to Alexios.
- July 1 – Battle of Dorylaeum: The Crusaders defeat a Seljuk army led by Kilij Arslan I, ruler of the Sultanate of Rum, who wants revenge for the capture of Nicaea. During the battle many Crusaders are killed but the Seljuk Turks are forced to flee and abandon their tents and treasure after being surprised by the arrival of a second Crusader army.
- October 21 – Siege of Antioch: The Crusaders arrive outside the city and begin the siege. They can not impose a complete blockade on Antioch. The Seljuk garrison comes out of the city to harass Crusader siege-lines and intercept supply convoys (supported by a Genoese fleet of 12 galleys) from Saint Symeon and Alexandretta (modern Turkey).
- December 31 – Battle of Harenc: The Crusaders under the command of Bohemond I and Robert II defeat Seljuk forces from Aleppo, which try to relieve besieged Antioch.

====== Europe ======
- April/May – Battle of Gvozd Mountain: In an attempt to win the crown of the Kingdom of Croatia, the Hungarian army crosses the Drava River and invades Croatia. King Peter II of Croatia moves his residency at Knin Castle to defend his kingdom. The two armies meet each other near Gvozd Mountain (modern-day Mala Kapela). After a fierce battle Peter, the last Croatian king, is defeated and killed by the Hungarians.
- Summer – Almoravid forces launch a new campaign in Al-Andalus (modern Spain). Sultan Yusuf ibn Tashfin, leader of the Almoravid Empire, is honored with the title of Amir al Muslimin ("Commander of the Muslims").
- August 15 – Battle of Consuegra: The Castilian and Leonese army (30,000 men) of King Alfonso VI ('"the Brave") is defeated by Almoravid forces (10,000 men) near the Castle of Consuegra.

====== Scotland ======
- King Donald III of Scotland ("the Fair") is deposed by his nephew Edgar (who is supported by King William II of England) after a 4-year reign. Edgar (nicknamed Probus, "the Valliant") becomes ruler of Scotland until 1107.

====== England ======
- William II orders the construction of Westminster Hall near Westminster Abbey in London. The hall is designed to hold banquets, ceremonies and coronations that take place in the Abbey nearby.

==== By topic ====
====== Religion ======
- October – Anselm, archbishop of Canterbury, goes into exile. Conflicts between him and William II result in Anselm leaving England and heading for Rome. William confiscates Anselm's land.

=== 1098 ===
==== By place ====
====== First Crusade ======
- February 9 – Battle of the Lake of Antioch: The Crusaders under Bohemond I defeat a Seljuk relief force (some 12,000 men) led by Sultan Fakhr al-Mulk Radwan of Aleppo. Bohemond gathers 700 knights, and marches in the night to ambush the Seljuk Turks at the Lake of Antioch (modern Turkey). After several successful cavalry charges the Crusaders rout the Seljuk army, forcing Radwan to retreat back to Aleppo.
- March 10 – Baldwin of Boulogne enters Edessa, and is welcomed as liberator by the Armenian clergy. The local population massacres the Seljuk garrison and officials – or forces them to flee. Baldwin is acknowledged as their ruler (or doux). He assumes the title of count and establishes the first crusader state. Baldwin marries Arda of Armenia, daughter of Lord Thoros of Marash, and consolidates his conquered territory.
- June 3 – Siege of Antioch: The Crusaders under Bohemond I capture Antioch after a 8-month siege. He established secret contact with Firouz, an Armenian guard who controlled the "Tower of the Two Sisters". He opened the gates and Bohemond entered the city. Thousands of Christians are massacred along with Muslims. Bohemond is named Prince of Antioch (under protest) and creates the Principality of Antioch.
- June 5 – Battle of Antioch: Emir Kerbogha, ruler (atabeg) of Mosul, arrives at Antioch with a Seljuk army (35,000 men) to relieve the city. He lays siege to the Crusaders who have just captured the city themselves (although they do not have full control of it). A Byzantine relief force led by Emperor Alexios I Komnenos turns back after Count Stephen of Blois convinces them that the situation in Antioch is hopeless.
- June 28 – Following the Holy Lance discovery by Peter Bartholomew in Antioch, the Crusaders under Bohemond I (leaving only 200 men) sortie from the city and defeat the Seljuk army. Kerbogha is forced to withdraw to Mosul, the garrison in the citadel surrenders to Bohemond personally (who raises his banner above the city) and the Crusaders occupy Antioch. The Crusade is delayed for the rest of the year.
- July 14 – Donation of Altavilla: Bohemond I grants commercial privileges and the right to use warehouses (fondaco) to the Republic of Genoa. This marks the beginning of Italian merchant settlements in the Levant.
- August 1 – Adhemar of Le Puy (or Aimar), French bishop and nominal leader of the First Crusade, dies during an epidemic (probably typhus). With this, Rome's direct control over the Crusade effectively ends.
- August – Fatimid forces under Caliph Al-Musta'li recapture Jerusalem and occupy Palestine. The Crusaders threaten the borders of the Fatimid Caliphate which already has lost the Emirate of Sicily (see 1091).
- December 12 – Siege of Ma'arra: The Crusaders capture the city of Ma'arra after a month's siege and massacre part of the population. Short of supplies, the army is accused of widespread cannibalism.

====== Britain ======
- June or July – Battle of Anglesey Sound: A Norwegian fleet led by King Magnus Barefoot reverses an Anglo-Norman invasion of North Wales. Magnus conquers the Orkney Islands, the Hebrides and the Isle of Man.
- King Edgar of Scotland signs a treaty with Magnus III in which he agrees that the northern territories including the Hebrides belong to Norway. At Dunfermline Abbey, Edgar seeks support from Anselm of Canterbury.

==== By topic ====
====== Religion ======
- March 21 – Cîteaux Abbey, located in Saint-Nicolas-lès-Cîteaux, is founded by Robert of Molesme, founder of the Cistercian Order.
- October – The Council of Bari presided by Pope Urban II discusses relations between the Western and the Eastern Church.

=== 1099 ===
==== By place ====
====== First Crusade ======
- January 16 – The Crusaders, under Raymond IV, count of Toulouse (Raymond of Saint-Gilles), leave Antioch, and head south towards Jerusalem. They are joined by forces of Tancred (a nephew of Bohemond I) and Robert II, duke of Normandy. Raymond is given free passage and supplies, and accepts guides from the Emir of Shaizar (modern Syria), who conducts the army (6,000 men) across the Orontes River (between Shaizar and Hama).
- January 22 – The Crusaders, under Raymond IV, reach Masyaf, where a treaty is agreed to. They decide to continue the march, rather than to capture or destroy the town. The next day the Crusaders enter the deserted town of Rafaniyah, that provides them with much-needed supplies. Raymond moves into the Buqaia Valley, and takes the strategic Kurdish fortress of Hosn al-Akrad (the future Krak des Chevaliers castle).
- February – The Crusaders under Godfrey of Bouillon set out from Antioch to Latakia. They are joined by forces of Bohemond I and Robert II, count of Flanders. On their arrival, Bohemond decides to turn back to consolidate his power in Antioch. Godfrey and Robert move on to besiege the small sea-port of Jabala. After two weeks, the Emir of Jabala makes a truce, and accepts the suzerainty of the Crusaders.
- February 14 – The Crusaders under Raymond IV besiege the fortified town of Akkar – whose garrison is loyal to Jalal al-Mulk Abu'l-Hasan, emir of Tripoli (modern Lebanon). On May 13 after a 3-month siege the investment of Akkar is raised and Raymond orders the camp to be struck. The Crusader host, finally joined by the forces of Godfrey of Bouillon and Robert II, resumes his march southwards to Tripoli.
- February 17 – Raymond IV sends a small part of his army under Raymond Pilet to attack the port of Tortosa on the Syrian coast. The Crusaders led many fires around the port to make believe their number is greater than it is. Fooled by the deception, the governor and the garrison flees by sea in the night leaving the port open for the Crusaders to capture. The port becomes strategically important for supplies.
- May – The Crusaders march past Tripoli, accompanied by guides provided by the emir who lead them safely through the towns of Batroun and Byblos. On May 19 they cross the Dog River north of Beirut into Fatimid territory. There local governors supply the Crusaders with tribute and food in return for no damage to the agricultural area. The Fatimids keep no large troops in the north, except for small garrisons.
- May 20 – The Fatimid governor of Sidon refuses to cooperate and his garrison attacks the Crusader host while they are looting local villages. The Fatimids are repulsed, the towns further south generally follow the example of Beirut. The Crusaders move on to Tyre – Raymond IV decides to wait for two days to allow a force under Baldwin of Le Bourg (supported by knights from Antioch) to catch up with him.
- May 26 – The Crusaders march to Haifa and along the coast under Mount Carmel to Caesarea (modern Israel), where they rest for four days in order to celebrate Whitsun (Whit Sunday).
- June 2–6 – The Crusaders occupy Arsuf and turn inland towards Ramlah, where they reorganise for the march against Jerusalem. A Crusader force under Tancred liberates Bethlehem.
- June 7 – Siege of Jerusalem: The Crusaders reach the outskirts of Jerusalem, and begin the siege of the Holy City. Iftikhar al-Dawla offers a peace agreement but this is refused.
- June 13 – The Crusaders under Godfrey of Boullion launch their first assault on Jerusalem, while the Fatimid garrison and Jewish militia defend the northern wall at the Damascus Gate.
- June 17 – A naval squadron of six Genoese ships led by Guglielmo Embriaco (loaded with military materials) enters the port of Jaffa; all except one are trapped by a larger Fatimid fleet.
- July 8 – The Crusaders attempt to take Jerusalem by storm but are repulsed. In a procession they walk around the walls under leadership of priests in the hope the city would surrender.
- July 13 – The Crusader army (some 12,000 men) launch a final assault on Jerusalem. The attacks against the northern and southern wall are repulsed without establishing a foothold.
- July 15
  - The Crusaders breach the walls of Jerusalem after a two-pronged assault.
  - Iftikhar al-Dawla surrenders Jerusalem to Raymond IV in the Tower of David with a great sum of treasure in return for his life. He is escorted out of the city with his bodyguard.
- July 22 – The Kingdom of Jerusalem is established in the Middle East. Godfrey of Bouillon is named king (but refuses to be crowned) and takes the title Advocatus Sancti Sepulchri.
- August 10 – The Crusaders under Godfrey of Bouillon (supported by 1,200–1,300 knights) assemble at Yibna (Ibelin) – close to the coast and almost halfway from Jaffa to Ascalon.
- August 12 – Battle of Ascalon: The Crusader army (some 10,000 men) decisively defeats the Fatimids who are sent to relieve Jerusalem. Vizier Al-Afdal is forced to retreat to Egypt.
- November – A Crusader army under Bohemond I travels south to begin a pilgrimage to Jerusalem. They are accompanied by Baldwin of Boulogne, brother of Godfrey of Bouillon.
- December 21 – The Crusaders under Bohemond I and Baldwin arrive at Jerusalem. Four days later, Daimbert, archbishop of Pisa, is installed as the Latin Patriarch of Jerusalem.

==== By topic ====
====== Natural events ======
- November 11 – Great floods around the North Sea and English Channel.

====== Religion ======
- The commune in Emilia founds the Modena Cathedral, dedicated to the patron saint Geminianus. The Italian sculptor Wiligelmo creates reliefs with Genesis scenes.
- July 29 – Pope Urban II (Urbanus) dies after a 9-year pontificate at Rome. He is succeeded by Paschal II as the 160th pope of the Catholic Church.

== Significant people ==
- Nizam al-Mulk
- Pope Urban II
- Al-Muqtadi caliph of Baghdad
- Malik-Shah I Seljuk sultan

== Births ==
1090

- January 17 – Qin Hui, Chinese chancellor (d. 1155)
- unknown dates
  - Frederick II ("the One-Eyed"), German nobleman (d. 1147)
  - Dōin (Fujiwara no Atsuyori), Japanese waka poet (d. 1179)
- probable
  - Adolf III, German count of Berg and Hövel (d. 1152)
  - Agnes I, German abbess of Quedlinburg (approximate date)
  - Alaungsithu, Burmese king of the Pagan dynasty (d. 1167)
  - Arnold of Brescia, Italian canon regular (approximate date)
  - Bernard of Clairvaux, French abbot and theologian (d. 1153)
  - Chen Yuyi, Chinese politician of the Song dynasty (d. 1138)
  - Eliezer ben Nathan, German rabbi and liturgical poet (d. 1170)
  - Eric II ("the Memorable"), king of Denmark (approximate date)
  - Fujiwara no Akisuke, Japanese nobleman and poet (d. 1155)
  - Juliane de Fontevrault, illegitimate daughter of King Henry I of England
  - Conrad I, Duke of Zähringen, German nobleman and rector of Burgundy (d. 1152)
  - Niklot (or Nyklot), Obotrite prince and tribal chief (d. 1160)
  - Robert, 1st Earl of Gloucester, illegitimate son of King Henry I of England
  - Theobald II, Count of Champagne ("the Great"), French nobleman
  - Theobald of Bec, Norman churchman, archbishop of Canterbury
  - William de Mohun, 1st Earl of Somerset, Anglo-Norman nobleman

1091

- September 18 – Andronikos Komnenos, Byzantine prince and general
- December 22 – Jutta von Sponheim, German abbess (d. 1136)
- Hongzhi Zhengjue, Chinese Chan Buddhist monk and writer (d. 1157)
- Matilda of Rethel, French noblewoman and sovereign (d. 1151)
- Tiantong Zongjue, Chinese Buddhist monk and patriarch (d. 1162)

1092

- Adélaide de Maurienne, queen consort of France (d. 1154)
- Al-Mustarshid, caliph of the Abbasid Caliphate (d. 1135)
- Fulk V ("the Younger"), Count of Anjou and king of Jerusalem (d. 1143)
- Magnús Einarsson, Icelandic bishop of Skálholt (d. 1148)
- Peter the Venerable, French monk and abbot (d. 1156)
- Sachen Kunga Nyingpo, Tibetan Buddhist leader (d. 1158)
- Sybilla of Normandy, queen consort of Scotland (d. 1122)
- Wartislaw I (or Warcisław), duke of Pomerania (approximate date)
- Zhang Jiucheng, Chinese politician (d. 1159)

1093

- January 16 – Isaac Komnenos, Byzantine co-ruler
- Ahmad Yasawi, Turkic poet and Sufi (d. 1166)
- Baldwin VII, count of Flanders (d. 1119)
- Conrad III, king of Italy and Germany (d. 1152)
- Demetrius I, king of Georgia (approximate date)
- Gerhoh of Reichersberg, German theologian (d. 1169)
- Grigor III, Armenian catholicos of Cilicia (d. 1166)
- Robert fitzEdith, English feudal lord (d. 1172)
- Sancho Alfónsez, Spanish nobleman (d. 1108)
- Simon of Hauteville, count of Sicily (d. 1105)
- Simon of Vermandois, French bishop (d. 1148)
- William III, count of Ponthieu (approximate date)

1094

- January 14 – Eudokia Komnene, Byzantine princess (d. 1129)
- Abd al-Mu'min, Almohad caliph (approximate date)
- Ibn Zuhr (or Avenzoar), Moorish physician (d. 1162)
- Malachy, Irish archbishop and saint (d. 1148)
- Richard d'Avranches, 2nd Earl of Chester (d. 1120)
- Yelü Dashi, founder of the Qara Khitai (d. 1143)

1095

- July 4 – Usama ibn Munqidh, Arabian diplomat and poet (d. 1188)
- December 22 – Roger II, king of Sicily (d. 1154)
- Amadeus III, count of Savoy and Maurienne (d. 1148)
- Fujiwara no Taishi, Japanese empress (d. 1156)
- Geoffrey of Monmouth, English historian (d. 1155)
- Hériman of Tournai, French chronicler (d. 1147)
- Hugh Bigod, 1st Earl of Norfolk, English nobleman and advisor (d. 1177)
- Hugh Candidus, English monk and historian (d. 1160)
- Kōgyō-Daishi, Japanese Buddhist priest (d. 1143)
- Robert Fitzharding, English nobleman (d. 1170)
- Ulvhild Håkansdotter, twice Swedish queen consort and once Danish queen consort (d. 1148)
- Victor IV (Octavian), antipope of Rome (d. 1164)
- William II, duke of Apulia and Calabria (d. 1127)
- William of Malmesbury, English historian (d. 1143)
- Zishou Miaozong, Chinese Zen master (d. 1170)

1096

- January 15 – Theodora Komnene, Byzantine princess
- March 12 – Canute Lavard, duke of Schleswig (d. 1131)
- April 9 – Al-Muqtafi, caliph of the Abbasid Caliphate (d. 1160)
- December 31 – Al-Amir bi-Ahkam Allah, Fatimid caliph (d. 1130)
- Ermengol VI ("el de Castilla"), count of Urgell (d. 1154)
- Galdino della Sala (or Galdinus), Archbishop of Milan (d. 1176)
- Henry of Blois, bishop of Winchester (approximate date)
- Hugh of Saint Victor, German scholar and theologian (d. 1141)
- Iziaslav II Mstislavich, Grand Prince of Kyiv (d. 1154)
- Minamoto no Tameyoshi, Japanese nobleman (d. 1156)
- Peter Lombard, French bishop and theologian (d. 1160)
- Stephen of Blois, king of England (approximate date)
- Taira no Tadamori, Japanese nobleman (d. 1153)
- Wang Ximeng, Chinese landscape painter (d. 1119)
- William VI, count of Auvergne and Velay (d. 1136)

1097

- March 15 – Fujiwara no Tadamichi, Japanese nobleman (d. 1164)
- November 5 – André de Montbard, French nobleman (d. 1156)
- Abu al-Najib Suhrawardi, Persian scholar and Sufi (d. 1168)
- Abu'l-Hasan Bayhaqi, Persian polymath and official (d. 1169)
- Cecile of France, French princess and countess of Tripoli (d. 1145)
- Conrad I ("the Great"), margrave of Meissen (approximate date) (d. 1157)
- Muhammad Buzurg Ummid, Persian ruler of Alamut (d. 1162)
- Zhang Jun, Chinese general and grand chancellor (d. 1164)

1098

- Amadeus I, Swiss nobleman (House of Geneva) (d. 1178)
- Ayn al-Quzat Hamadani, Persian philosopher and poet (d. 1131)
- Hedwig of Gudensberg, German countess and regent (d. 1148)
- Hildegard of Bingen, German Benedictine abbess (d. 1179)
- John of the Grating, French bishop and saint (d. 1163)
- Pons, French nobleman (House of Toulouse) (d. 1137)
- Simon II de Senlis, Earl of Huntingdon-Northampton, Anglo-Norman nobleman (d. 1153)
- Wibald, German abbot and councillor (d. 1158)

1099

- Olav Magnusson, king of Norway (d. 1115)
- Ranulf de Gernon, 4th Earl of Chester, Anglo-Norman nobleman (d. 1153)
- Raymond of Poitiers, prince of Antioch (d. 1149)
- Thierry of Alsace, count of Flanders (d. 1168)
- William X, Duke of Aquitaine ("the Saint"), French nobleman (d. 1137)
- Yuri Dolgorukiy, Grand Prince of Kiev (d. 1157)

== Deaths ==
1090

- March 22 – García II, king of Galicia and Portugal (b. 1042)
- April 16 – Sikelgaita, Lombard duchess of Apulia (b. 1040)
- May 3 – Adelaide of Rheinfelden, queen consort of Hungary
- May 12 – Liutold of Eppenstein, German nobleman
- May 18 – Berthold of Rheinfelden, German nobleman
- June 26 – Jaromír, Bohemian prince and bishop
- July 3 – Egbert II (or Ekbert), German nobleman
- August 11 – Fujiwara no Atsuie, Japanese nobleman (b. 1033)
- August 13 – Constance of Normandy, duchess of Brittany
- unknown dates
  - Abd al-Jalil ibn Wahbun, Moorish poet and writer
  - Fayun Faxiu, Chinese Chan Buddhist monk (b. 1027)
  - Richard fitz Gilbert, Norman nobleman (b. c.10350
  - Guo Xi, Chinese landscape painter
  - St Isaiah of Rostov, Kievan missionary and bishop
  - Raynald I, French Benedictine abbot (b. 1059)
  - William of Poitiers, French priest and chronicler (b. c.1020)
- probable
  - Osbern of Canterbury, English hagiographer

1091

- March 26 – Wallada bint al-Mustakfi, Andalusian female poet (b. 994)
- June 17 – Dirk V, count of Friesland (west of the Vlie) (b. 1052)
- June 29 – Frederick of Montbéliard, margrave of Turin
- July 5 – William of Hirsau, German abbot and music theorist
- August 8 – Altmann of Passau, German bishop and saint
- August 25 – Sisnando Davides, Mozarab military leader
- December 19
  - Adelaide of Susa, margravine of Turin
  - Fujiwara no Tadaie, Japanese statesman (b. 1033)
- Fu Yaoyu, Chinese government official and politician (b. 1024)
- Helena of Hungary, queen consort of Croatia (approximate date)
- Jordan I (or Giordano), Italo-Norman prince of Capua
- Mac meic Aedh Ua Flaithbheartaigh, Irish king of Iar Connacht
- Robert D'Oyly, Norman nobleman (approximate date)
- Stephen II (or Stjepan), king of Croatia (approximate date)
- Wolfhelm of Brauweiler, German Benedictine abbot
- Artuk Bey (Zaheer-ul-Daulah Artuk Beg), Seljuk general and governor

1092

- January 14 – Vratislaus II, duke and king of Bohemia
- May 7 – Remigius de Fécamp, bishop of Lincoln
- September 6 – Conrad I, duke of Bohemia
- October 14 – Nizam al-Mulk, Seljuk vizier (b. 1018)
- November 19 – Malik-Shah I, Seljuk sultan (b. 1055)
- Abu'l-Qasim, Seljuk general and governor
- Bermudo Ovéquiz (or "Vermudo"), Spanish nobleman
- Bogumił, archbishop of Gniezno (approximate date)
- Ermengol IV (or Armengol), count of Urgell (b. 1056)
- Helibo, Chinese nobleman and chieftain (b. 1039)
- Jordan of Hauteville, Italo-Norman nobleman
- Richard de Montfort, French nobleman

1093

- February 1 – Abul Hasan Hankari, Abbasid scholar (b. 1018)
- April – Rhys ap Tewdwr, Welsh king of Deheubarth, killed in battle (b. 997)
- April 13 – Vsevolod I Yaroslavich, Grand Prince of Kyiv (b. 1030)
- May 26 – Rostislav Vsevolodovich, prince of Pereyaslavl
- June 21 – Ja'far ibn Abdallah al-Muqtadi, Abbasid prince, son of al-Muqtadi and Mah-i Mulk
- July 10 – Ulrich of Zell, German Cluniac reformer (b. 1029)
- August 4 – Alan Rufus, Breton/Norman nobleman (approximate year)
- August 24 – Geoffrey Boterel, Breton nobleman, eldest brother of Alan Rufus
- August 29 – Hugh I, Duke of Burgundy, French nobleman and abbot (b. 1057)
- September 22 – Olaf III "the Peaceful", king of Norway
- October 13 – Robert I, Count of Flanders
- November 13 – Malcolm III, king of Scotland (b. 1031)
- November 16 – Margaret, queen consort of Scotland (b. 1045)
- Bertrand II, count of Provence (approximate date)
- Constance of Burgundy, queen consort of Castile and León (b. 1046)
- Gao, Chinese empress (Song dynasty) (b. 1032)
- Iestyn ap Gwrgant, Welsh king of Morgannwg (b. 1014)
- Kaoruko, Japanese empress consort (b. 1029)
- Odo V (or Eudes), count of Troyes and Meaux
- Tzachas, Seljuk general and usurper, killed
- Wang Shen, Chinese painter and poet

1094

- January 10 – Al-Mustansir Billah, Fatimid caliph (b. 1029)
- February 3
  - Al-Muqtadi, Abbasid caliph (b. 1056)
  - Teishi, Japanese empress (b. 1013)
- June 2 – Nicholas the Pilgrim, Italian shepherd (b. 1075)
- June 4 – Sancho V, king of Aragon and Pamplona
- July 28 – William Bertrand, margrave of Provence
- October 14
  - Bertha of Holland, French queen consort
  - Fujiwara no Nobunaga, Japanese nobleman (b. 1022)
- October – Mahmud I, sultan of the Seljuk Empire
- November 12 – Duncan II, king of Scotland
- Abu Ali Fana-Khusrau, Buyid nobleman
- Al-Bakri, Moorish historian and geographer
- Aq Sunqur al-Hajib, Seljuk sultan of Aleppo
- Badr al-Jamali, Fatimid vizier and statesman
- Isaac Albalia, Andalusian Jewish astronomer (b. 1035)
- Jonathan I, Italo-Norman count of Carinola
- Michael of Avranches, Italian bishop
- Roger de Beaumont, Norman nobleman
- Roger de Montgomery, Norman nobleman
- Terken Khatun, Seljuk empress and regent
- William Fitzeustace, 1st Earl of Gloucester, Norman nobleman
- Wulfnoth Godwinson, English nobleman

1095

- January 20 – Wulfstan, bishop of Worcester
- March 5 – Judith of Flanders, duchess of Bavaria
- June 18 – Sophia of Hungary, duchess of Saxony
- June 26 – Robert the Lotharingian, bishop of Hereford
- July 29 – Ladislaus I, king of Hungary
- August 18 – Olaf I ("Hunger"), king of Denmark
- October 12 – Leopold II, margrave of Austria (b. 1050)
- November 22 – Donngus Ua hAingliu, Irish bishop
- Agapetus of Pechersk, Kievan monk and doctor
- Al-Humaydī, Andalusian scholar and writer (b. 1029)
- Ali ibn Faramurz, Kakuyid emir of Yazd and Abarkuh
- Al-Mu'tamid ibn Abbad, Abbadid emir of Seville (b. 1040)
- Gerald of Sauve-Majeure, French Benedictine abbot
- Godred Crovan, Norse-Gaelic king of Dublin
- Henry of Laach, German count palatine of the Rhine
- Nizar ibn al-Mustansir, Fatimid prince (b. September 26 1045)
- Robert, 2nd Earl of Cornwall (approximate date)
- Ruben I (or Rupen), prince of Armenia (b. 1025)
- Shen Kuo, Chinese polymath scientist and engineer (b. 1031)
- Tutush I, Seljuk emir of Damascus and Aleppo
- Vitale Faliero (or Falier de' Doni), doge of Venice
- William I, count of Cerdanya and Berga

1096

- January 2 – William de St-Calais, Norman bishop and chief councilor
- January 11 – Adelaide II, German princess and abbess (b. 1045)
- May – Worms massacre:
  - Kalonymus ben Meshullam, French Jewish martyr
  - Minna of Worms, German-Jewish female moneylender and martyr
- October 21 – Walter Sans Avoir, French leader of the First Crusade
- November 11 – Werner I, German nobleman (House of Habsburg)
- December 23 – Hugh I of Le Puiset, French nobleman
- Eudokia Makrembolitissa, Byzantine empress and regent
- Fariburz I, Persian ruler of Shirvan (House of Shirvanshah)
- Gao Shengtai, Chinese ruler of the Dazhong Kingdom
- Geoffrey III, Count of Anjou ("the Bearded"), French nobleman (b. 1040)
- Henry III, count of Luxembourg (House of Luxembourg)
- Ralph de Gael, Norman nobleman (approximate date)
- Sarakhsi, Persian scholar, jurist and writer (approximate date)
- Stephen II, German nobleman (House of Sponheim)

1097

- June 6 – Agnes of Aquitaine, queen consort of Aragon and Navarre
- June 16 – Wen Yanbo, Chinese grand chancellor (b. 1006)
- August 15 – Diego Rodríguez, Castilian nobleman
- August 20 – Albert Azzo II, margrave of Milan and Liguria
- November 6 – Heonjong, Korean king of Goryeo (b. 1084)
- Baldwin Chauderon, French nobleman and crusader
- Florine of Burgundy, French noblewoman and crusader (b. 1083)
- Herman of Hauteville, Norman nobleman and crusader
- Marpa Lotsawa, Tibetan Buddhist teacher (b. 1012)
- Minamoto no Tsunenobu, Japanese nobleman (b. 1016)
- Muhya bint Al-Tayyani, Andalusian female poet
- Odo of Bayeux, Norman nobleman and bishop
- Peter II, king of Croatia (see Battle of Gvozd Mountain)
- Sweyn the Crusader, Danish nobleman and crusader

1098

- January 3 – Walkelin, Norman bishop of Winchester
- February 22 – Hugh de Grandmesnil, Norman sheriff (b. 1032)
- July 31 – Hugh of Montgomery, 2nd Earl of Shrewsbury
- August 1 – Adhemar of Le Puy, French bishop (b. 1045)
- Alan the Black, Norman nobleman and lord of Richmond
- Baldwin II, count of Hainaut (House of Flanders) (b. 1056)
- Ephraim of the Caves, Kievan bishop of Pereiaslav
- Raymond IV (Raimundus), count of Pallars Jussà
- Robert de Say (Fitz-Picot), Norman nobleman
- Vinayaditya, Indian king of the Hoysala Empire
- Walo II of Chaumont-en-Vexin (or Galon II de Beaumont), viscount and constable of France (b. 1060)
- Yaghi Siyan, Seljuk governor of Antioch (b. 1011)

1099

- April 14 – Conrad, bishop of Utrecht
- April 20 – Peter Bartholomew, French soldier and mystic
- July 8 – Lawrence, Croatian monk and archbishop
- July 10 – El Cid (Rodrigo Diaz de Vivar), Castilian knight
- July 18 – Fujiwara no Moromichi, Japanese nobleman (b. 1062)
- July 29 – Urban II, pope of the Catholic Church (b. 1035)
- August 21 – Éverard III of Puiset, Viscount of Chartres, French nobleman
- December 3 – Osmund, Norman lord chancellor of England and bishop of Salisbury, canonized (b. 1065)
- Ermengarde de Carcassonne, French noblewoman
- Donald III ("the Fair"), king of Scotland (b. 1032)
- Qutb Shah, Persian Sufi and religious leader
- Rhygyfarch, Welsh bishop of St. David's (b. 1057)
- Walter of Pontoise, French abbot (approximate date)
