= 1092 =

1092 in various calendars
- Gregorian calendar: 1092; MXCII
- Ab urbe condita: 1845
- Armenian calendar: 541; ԹՎ ՇԽԱ
- Assyrian calendar: 5842
- Balinese saka calendar: 1013–1014
- Bengali calendar: 498–499
- Berber calendar: 2042
- English Regnal year: 5 Will. 2 – 6 Will. 2
- Buddhist calendar: 1636
- Burmese calendar: 454
- Byzantine calendar: 6600–6601
- Chinese calendar: 辛未年 (Metal Goat); 3789 or 3582 — to — 壬申年 (Water Monkey); 3790 or 3583
- Coptic calendar: 808–809
- Discordian calendar: 2258
- Ethiopian calendar: 1084–1085
- Hebrew calendar: 4852–4853
- Hindu calendars
- Vikram Samvat: 1148–1149
- Shaka Samvat: 1013–1014
- Kali Yuga: 4192–4193
- Holocene calendar: 11092
- Igbo calendar: 92–93
- Iranian calendar: 470–471
- Islamic calendar: 484–485
- Japanese calendar: Kanji 6 (寛治６年)
- Javanese calendar: 996–997
- Julian calendar: 1092; MXCII
- Korean calendar: 3425
- Minguo calendar: 820 before ROC 民前820年
- Nanakshahi calendar: −376
- Seleucid era: 1403/1404 AG
- Thai solar calendar: 1634–1635
- Tibetan calendar: ལྕགས་མོ་ལུག་ལོ་ (female Iron-Sheep); 1218 or 837 or 65 — to — ཆུ་ཕོ་སྤྲེ་ལོ་ (male Water-Monkey); 1219 or 838 or 66

Map of the Seljuk Empire after the death of Sultan Malik-Shah I (r. 1072–1092)

Year 1092 (MXCII) was a leap year starting on Thursday of the Julian calendar.

== Events ==
=== By place ===
==== Byzantine Empire ====
- Summer – Emperor Alexios I Komnenos bribes one of Kilij Arslan's (sultan of the Sultanate of Rum) officials to recover Sinope (the capital of Paphlagonia), and neighbouring coastal regions. He uses the Byzantine fleet to defeat the Seljuk navy off the coast of Cius in Bithynia.

==== Europe ====
- January 14 – Vratislaus II, the first king of Bohemia, dies after a 6½-year reign and is succeeded by his brother Conrad I who becomes duke and not king because Vratislaus was elevated to the royal dignity 'for life' by Henry IV, Holy Roman Emperor (in 1085). Conrad dies September 6 after a 8-month reign and is succeeded by his nephew Bretislav II (the eldest son of Vratislaus).

==== Britain ====
- Summer – King William II annexes Cumbria from the Scottish Celtic kingdom of Strathclyde, and builds Carlisle Castle.
- May 11 – Lincoln Cathedral, one of England's finest Gothic buildings, is consecrated.

==== Seljuk Empire ====
- November 19 – Sultan Malik-Shah I dies after a 20-year reign while hunting. The Seljuk Empire falls into chaos: his brother Tutush I and rival successors carve up their own independent sultanates in the Middle East. Malik-Shah is succeeded by his son Mahmud I, but he does not gain control of the empire.

==== China ====
- Su Song, a Chinese statesman and scientist, publishes his Xin Yi Xiang Fa Yao, a treatise outlining the construction and operation of his complex astronomical clocktower, built in Kaifeng. It also includes a celestial atlas of five star maps.

=== By topic ===
==== Religion ====
- April 21 – The Diocese of Pisa is elevated to the dignity of a metropolitan archdiocese by Pope Urban II.
- May 21 – Synod of Szabolcs: King Ladislaus I of Hungary assembles a council of the prelates of his kingdom at the fortress of Szabolcs.

== Births ==
- Adélaide de Maurienne, queen consort of France (d. 1154)
- Al-Mustarshid, caliph of the Abbasid Caliphate (d. 1135)
- Fulk V ("the Younger"), Count of Anjou and king of Jerusalem (d. 1143)
- Magnús Einarsson, Icelandic bishop of Skálholt (d. 1148)
- Peter the Venerable, French monk and abbot (d. 1156)
- Sachen Kunga Nyingpo, Tibetan Buddhist leader (d. 1158)
- Sybilla of Normandy, queen consort of Scotland (d. 1122)
- Wartislaw I (or Warcisław), duke of Pomerania (approximate date)
- Zhang Jiucheng, Chinese politician (d. 1159)

== Deaths ==
- January 14 – Vratislaus II, duke and king of Bohemia
- May 7 – Remigius de Fécamp, bishop of Lincoln
- September 6 – Conrad I, duke of Bohemia
- October 14 – Nizam al-Mulk, Seljuk vizier (b. 1018)
- November 19 – Malik-Shah I, Seljuk sultan (b. 1055)
- Abu'l-Qasim, Seljuk general and governor
- Bermudo Ovéquiz (or "Vermudo"), Spanish nobleman
- Bogumił, archbishop of Gniezno (approximate date)
- Ermengol IV (or Armengol), count of Urgell (b. 1056)
- Helibo, Chinese nobleman and chieftain (b. 1039)
- Jordan of Hauteville, Italo-Norman nobleman
- Richard de Montfort, French nobleman
