= Szabolcs (chieftain) =

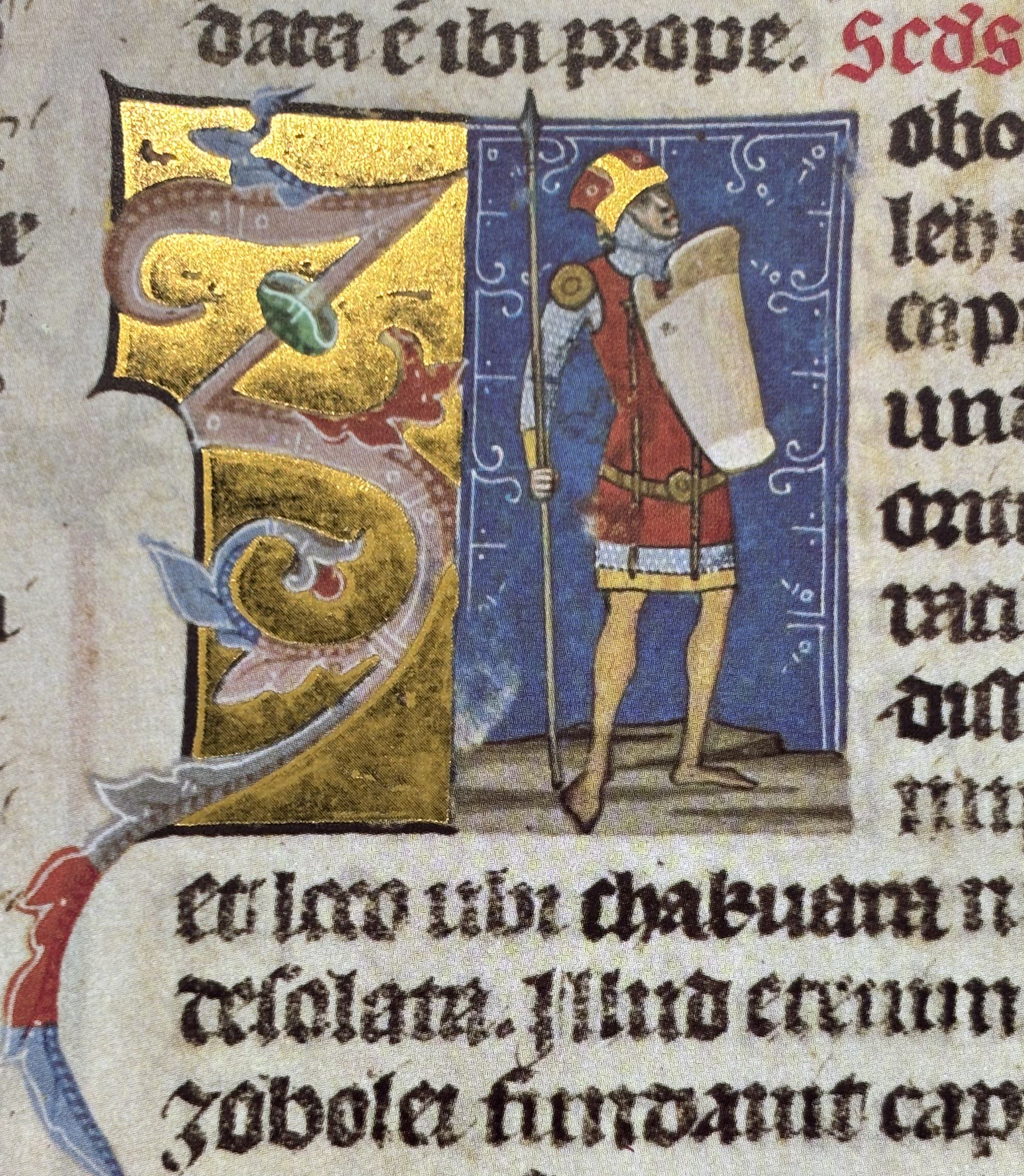
- Szabolcs as the second captain of the Hungarians depicted in the Illuminated Chronicle (1358)
- Born: 9th century
- House: gens Csák
- Father: Előd (?)

Szabolcs was a Hungarian leader who lived at the turn of the 9th and 10th centuries, according to the tradition preserved in Hungarian medieval literature, he was the second captain of the Hungarian conquerors and the ancestor of the gens (clan) Csák.

== In medieval literature ==
=== Gesta Hungarorum ===
Then Szabolcs, a most resourceful man, while inspecting a place beside the Tisza, saw the lie of the place, and realized it to be very well placed for a castle. With the common counsel of his companions and having assembled the men of the country, he had a great moat dug out and built a very strong earthwork, which is now called the castle of Szabolcs.

— Anonymus: The Deeds of the Hungarians

The undientified author of the Gesta Hungarorum (early 13th century) writes that Szabolcs (Zobolsu) was the son of Előd, one of the seven chieftains of the Magyars, who led their people to the Carpathian Basin in the late 9th century. Anonymus also writes that the powerful Csák kindred descended from Szabolcs.

The Gesta Hungarorum narrates that Szabolcs actively participated in the conquest of the Carpathian Basin in the late 9th century. Alongside chieftains Tas and Tétény, he was involved in the campaign against local ruler Menumorut. Anonymus writes that their army crossed Tisza and halted at a place near the future village of Szabolcs. The people here surrendered without resistance, giving their sons as hostages to them. Menomorut did not dare to launch a counter-attack, since more and more of his subjects were voluntarily yielding to the Magyars. Upon Szabolcs' order, an earthen fortress was built, which was named after him, and the three Magyar commanders "appointed from among the inhabitants of the land many serving men to that castle" and manned the fortress with Magyar warriors under the command of a lieutenant named Ekölcs. Thereafter, the campaign continued and the army was divided into two parts; Szabolcs and Tas marched with half of the army along the river Tisza, conquering those areas and the people there, then they arrived in Sárvár near present-day Nagyecsed. After this, as Anonymus continues, Szabolcs and Tas led their division towards the Meszes Gate (Porta Mesesina), and successfully besieged the fortress of Szatmár (present-day Satu Mare, Romania), while a second division, led by Tétény, "conquered a great number of people" in the Nyírség. The two divisions rejoined at the Meszes Gate, where "the dwellers of the land built stone gateways and a great obstacle of trees" in accordance with the Magyar leaders' orders to defend the borders of their newly conquered lands. Anonymus emphasizes that the three Hungarian commanders were very proud that "they had subjected almost all the nations" of Menumorut's realm.

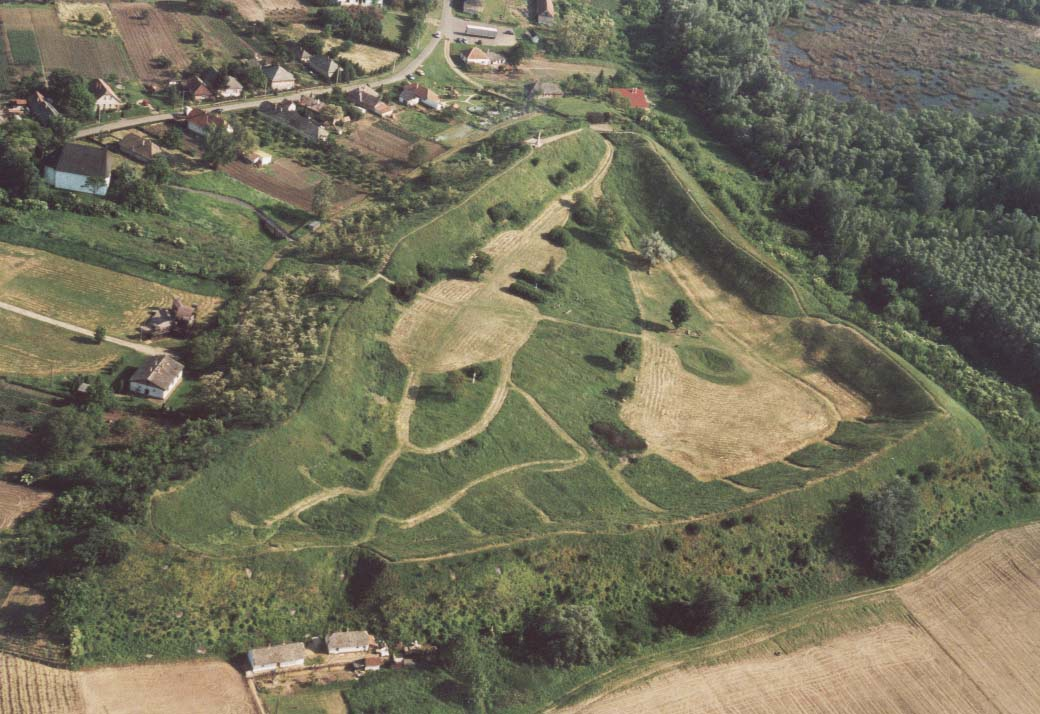
Aerial view of the fortress of Szabolcs

Following their victory over Menumorut, both Tas and Szabolcs decided to return to the court of Grand Prince Árpád, "subduing the whole people from the Szamos River to the Körös River" on their way. Menumorut was at this point planning to escape to the Byzantine Empire, but his warriors prevented Szabolcs and Tas from crossing the Körös at Szeghalom, thus forcing the Magyars to temporarily retreat. The army of Tas and Szabolcs "arrived at the Tisza and, crossing the Tisza River at the ford of Dorogma". Their return was accompanied by a bright celebration at the princely court.

The Gesta Hungarorum also narrates that Árpád, when he began the conquest of Transdanubia, "gave to Előd, father of Szabolcs, a great wood that is now called Vértes on account of the shields of the Germans that were abandoned there [in 1051]. At the bottom of that wood, beside Lake Fertő, a long time later, Csák, nephew or grandson (nepos) of Szabolcs, built a castle". According to Anonymus, Szabolcs was still a military commander under Grand Prince Zolta. When Zolta decided to launch as a campaign against Otto the Great to avenge the deaths of Bulcsú and Lehel (which, according to Anonymus, took place in 913), he appointed Botond, Szabolcs and Örkény (Urkund) to lead the Hungarian armies to the Kingdom of Italy and East Francia, plundering and looting vast territories.

=== Medieval chronicles ===
The second captain was Szabolcs, from whom springs the line of Csák, and he is said to have settled in the very place where Csákvára now lies in ruins. There the captain founded the castle Szabolcs which after his death Csák ordered to be called after his own name by his kindred and family; but it was at first called the castle of Szabolcs. In the times of Andrew, Béla and Levente, the sons of Ladislas the Bald, the castle was destroyed by common decree of the Hungarians.

— Illuminated Chronicle

The 14th-century chronicle composition, including the Illuminated Chronicle, which incorporated various texts from the 11th century onwards, lists Szabolcs (Zoboleh) as one of the seven chieftains ("captains") of the Magyars during the conquest of the Carpathian Basin. The chronicle text mentions the name of Szabolcs ("second captain") right behind Árpád. He appears here as progenitor of the gens (clan) Csák as well. He erected a castle in present-day Csákvár in Fejér County, which, however, was supposedly already destroyed by the middle of the 11th century. Hungarian historian Elemér Mályusz considered that the text about Szabolcs was written by the chronicler Ákos in the middle of the 13th century.

Ákos' near-contemporary, Simon of Kéza summarized and repeated the surviving information about Szabolcs in his work Gesta Hunnorum et Hungarorum (early 1280s): "The leader of the second host, Szabolcs (Zobole), pitched camp where the ruins of Csákvár now stand. Szabolcs is held to be the ancestor of the Csák kindred".

== In historiography ==
György Györffy accepted Szabolcs as one of the seven chieftains during the Hungarian conquest, so according to him he may have lived at the turn of the 9th and 10th centuries. Based on topographic names the comparison of various chronicle information (Szabolcs as "second captain" and his parentage), he claimed that Szabolcs was the younger brother or nephew of Árpád, whom he succeeded as Grand Prince. Györffy, who first laid the foundations of his theory in 1970, considered that Szabolcs inherited the throne based on the principle of seniority. He added that Szabolcs' lands in future Fejér County (the area of Csákvár and Székesfehérvár around swamp Fertő, i.e. Lake Velence) wedged between the tribal areas of Árpád and his sons, and, thus, Szabolcs was also a member of the royal Árpád dynasty, which is also confirmed by the tradition preserved in the Csák clan about their Hungarian royal lineage. Györffy claimed that Szabolcs was granted the princely territory between Pécs and the Csepel Island after the death of Árpád. In this theory, the Hungarian invasions of Europe took place under Szabolcs' reign, who extended the system of taxation and plunder to the Balkans too. Györffy claimed that Szabolcs erected his namesake castle as a winter residence in Tiszántúl, which then became the center of the later formed Szabolcs County in the early 11th century. Some historians and archaeologists – for instance, István Dienes, Péter Németh (initially), István Herényi and Kornél Bakay – accepted Györffy's theory regarding the hypothetical reign of Szabolcs.

Most of the historians rejected Györffy's theory. Sándor László Tóth (1986) pointed out that it contradicts more information from De Administrando Imperio (around 950), where Constantine VII lists the family tree of the Árpáds and states that all Hungarian grand princes descended from the lineage of Árpád. Tóth added that even the late Hungarian chronicle tradition did not consider Szabolcs to be a ruler of Hungary. Gyula Kristó (1987) emphasized that written sources do not confirm Györffy's theory. Archaeologist Gyula Nováki determined that the fortress of Szabolcs was built in the mid-10th century. Later, in 2001, Kristó even considered that Szabolcs was a fictitious person invented by Anonymus in the early 13th century. Accordingly, the chronicler connected his person with the Csák clan based solely on the fact that the latter owned Pusztaszabolcs.

Elemér Mályusz argued that the Hungarian chroniclers sought to emphasize the ancientness of the Csák kindred when they made chieftain Szabolcs their ancestor without any basis. Mályusz did not question the existence of Szabolcs, and believed that Anonymus also used folk heroic songs preserved in Nyírség when writing about the military exploits of Szabolcs and Tas. Péter Németh considered that Szabolcs may have been one of the most prestigious of the tribal chiefs during the Hungarian conquest, commanding the military auxiliary peoples, the Kabars or Black Hungarians. The conquest of Nyírség was celebrated with heroic song, and for this deed Szabolcs received estates close to the Árpáds' territories in Northern Transdanubia.

== Legacy ==
According to the local tradition, possibly based on Anonymus' narration, Szabolcs County in Kingdom of Hungary and, consequently, present-day Szabolcs–Szatmár–Bereg County in Hungary were named after Chieftain Szabolcs. However, if the fort Szabolcs was indeed built in the second half of the 10th century, it is possible that it was named after the first ispán of the castle – and thus the county – a certain Szabolcs, as is the case with several other counties after the foundation of the Christian kingdom in early 11th century.

== Gallery ==
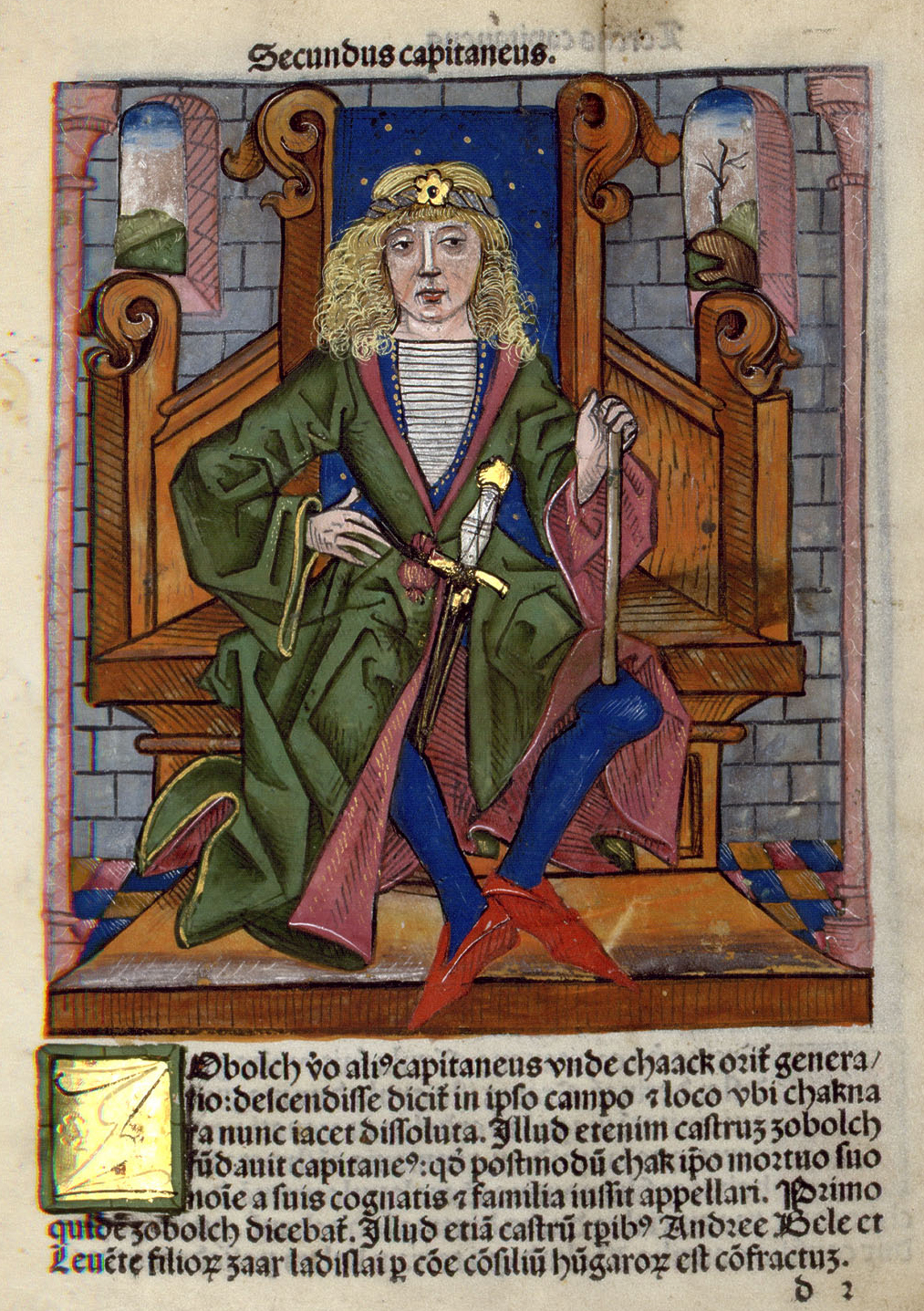
Captain Szabolcs in the Chronica Hungarorum (1488)

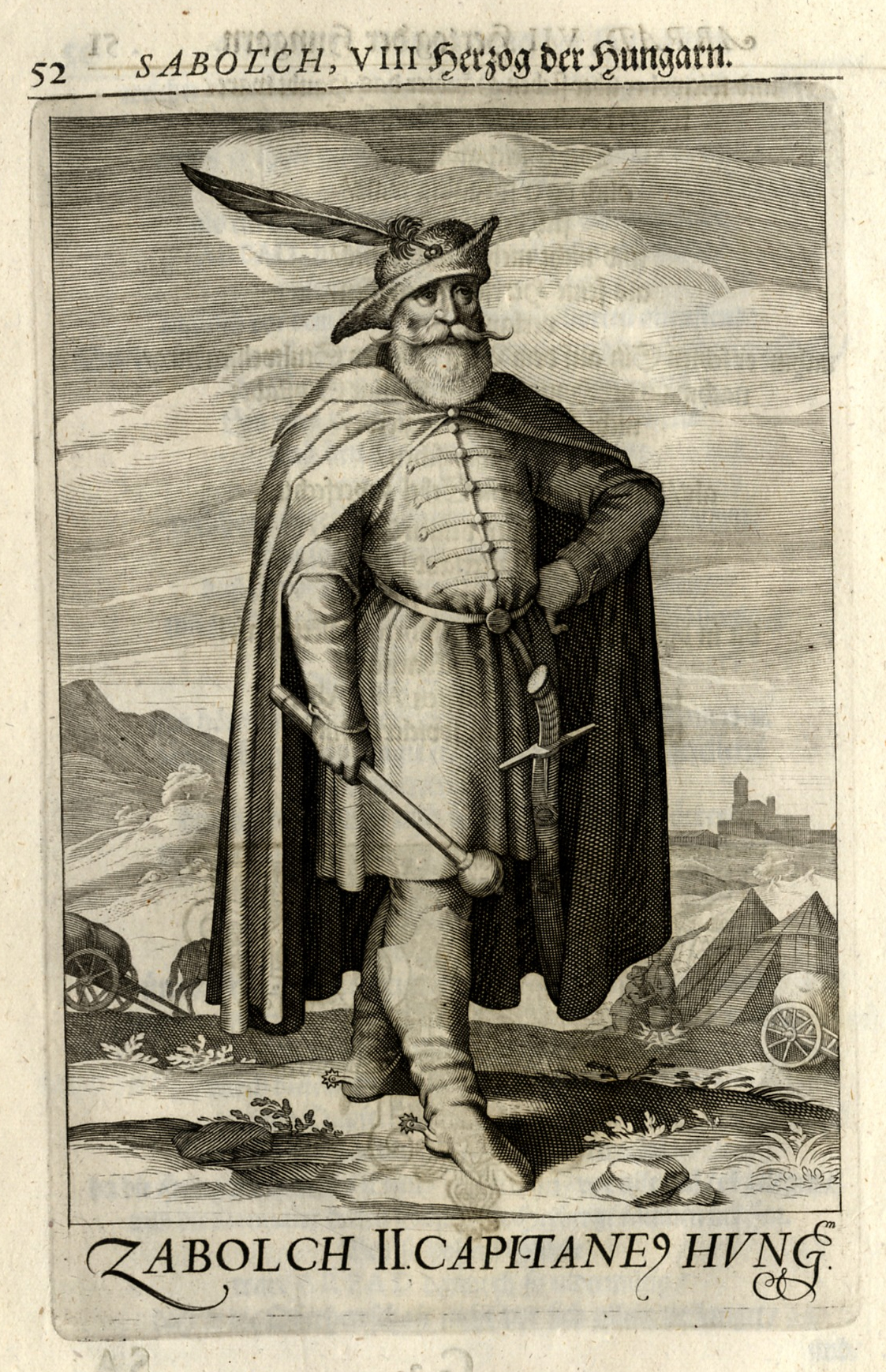
Captain Szabolcs in the Nádasdy Mausoleum (1664)

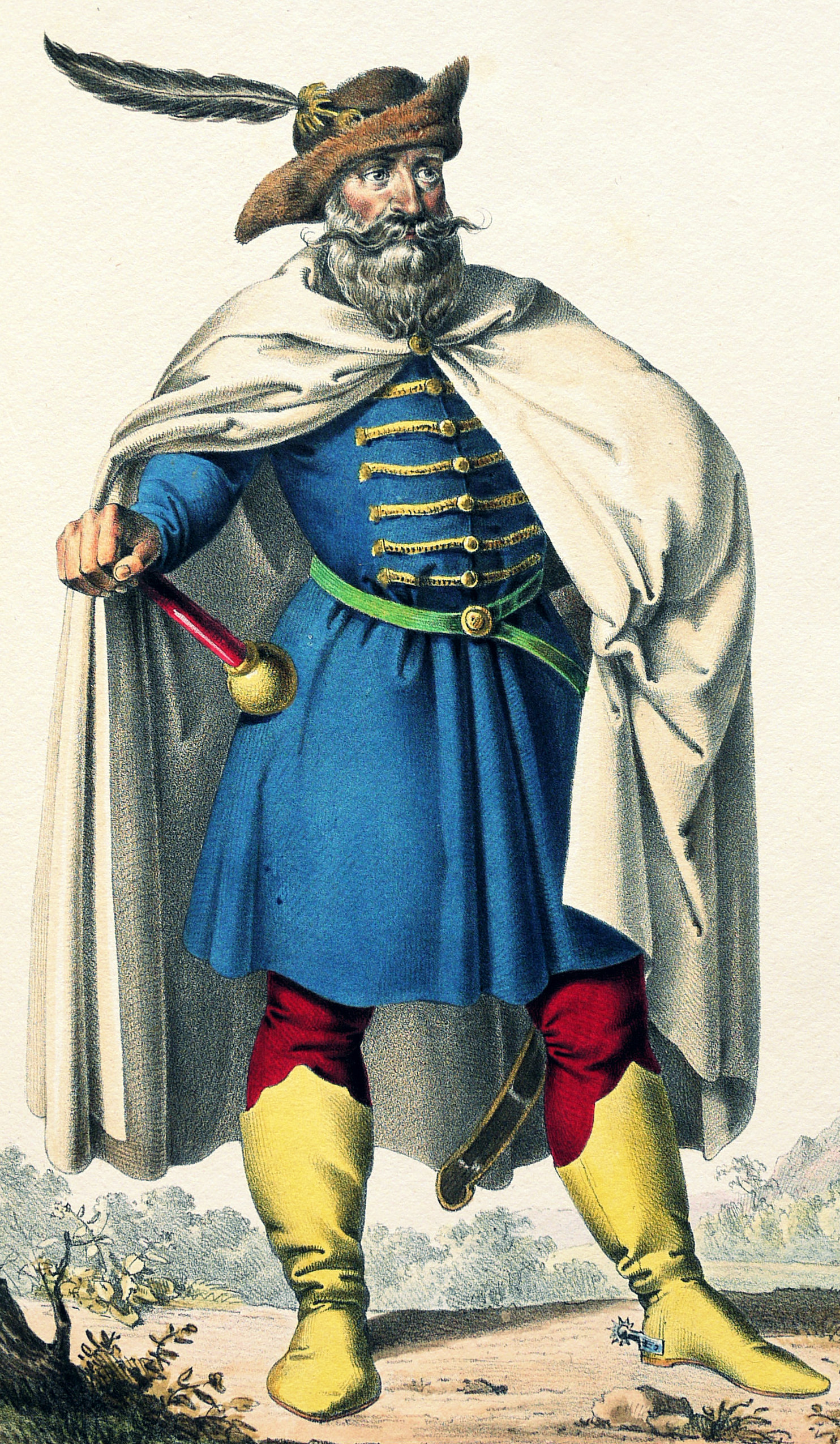
Captain Szabolcs (painting by Moritz von Schwind based on a lithograph by Josef Kriehuber, 1828)

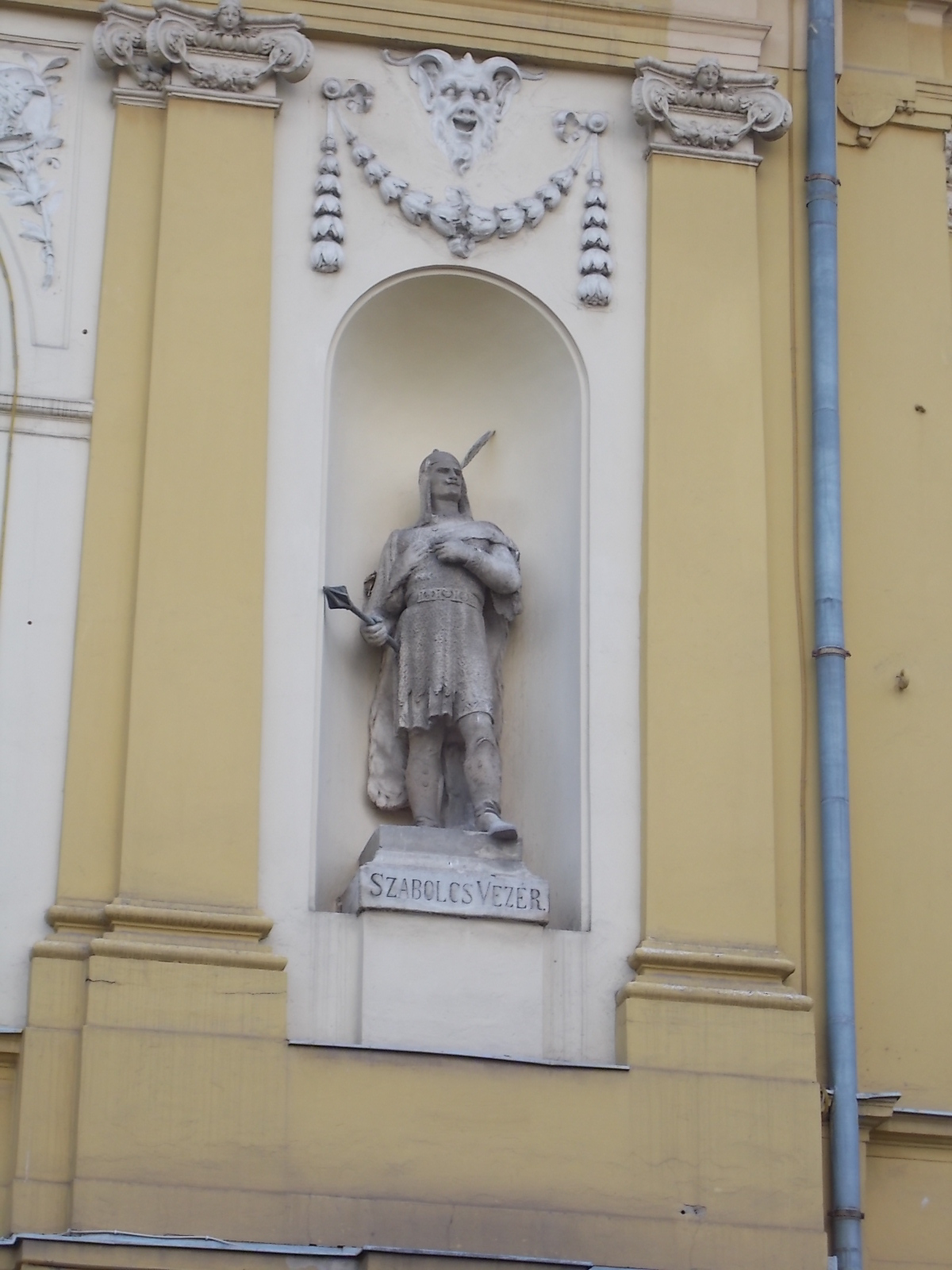
Statue of Chieftain Szabolcs at the County Hall in Nyíregyháza, Szabolcs-Szatmár-Bereg County, Hungary (1898)

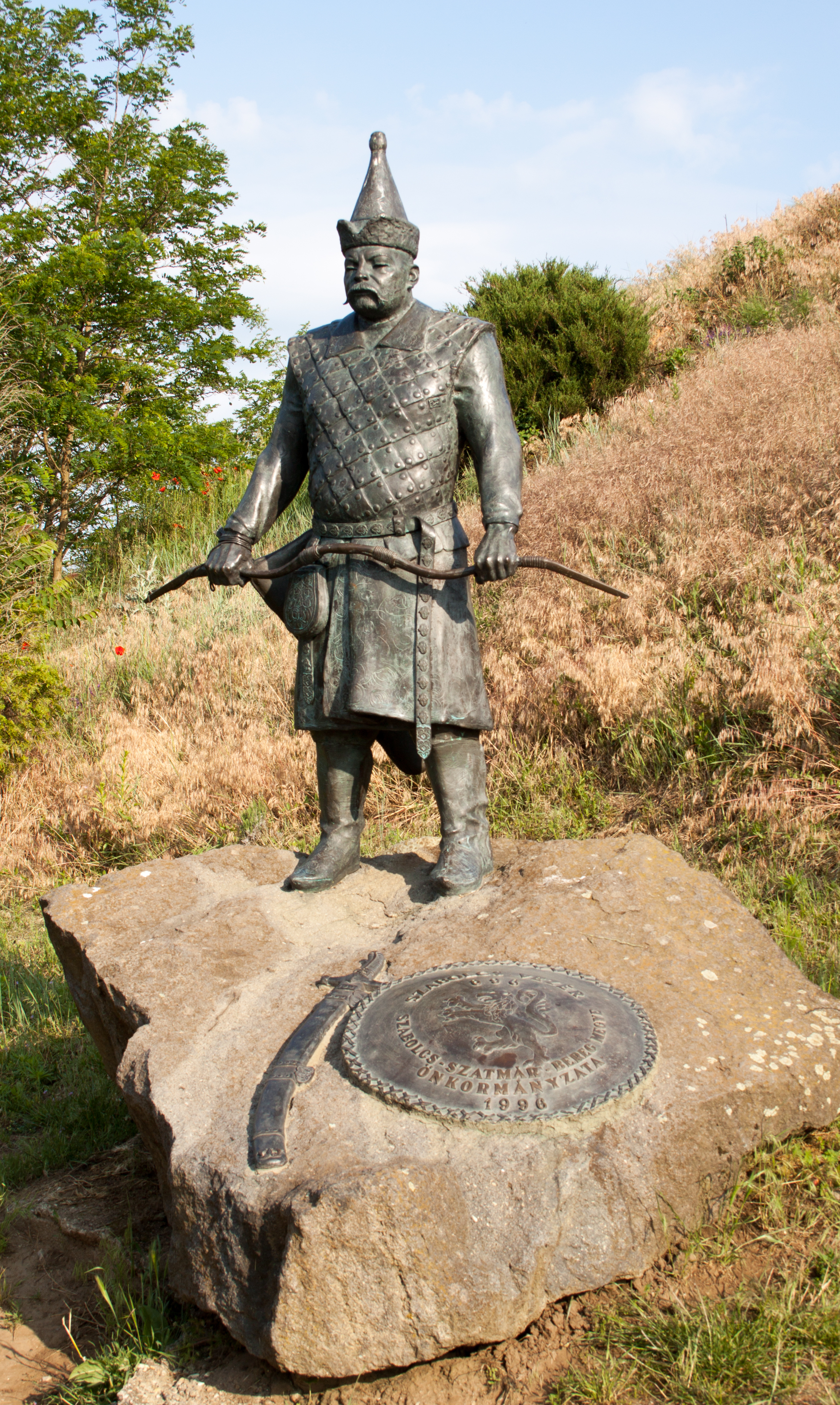
The statue of Chieftain Szabolcs stands beside the Szabolcs Earthwork (Sándor Győrfi, 1996)

== Sources ==
=== Primary sources ===
- Anonymus, Notary of King Béla: The Deeds of the Hungarians (Edited, Translated and Annotated by Martyn Rady and László Veszprémy) (2010). In: Rady, Martyn; Veszprémy, László; Bak, János M. (2010); Anonymus and Master Roger; CEU Press; ISBN 978-963-9776-95-1.
- Simon of Kéza: The Deeds of the Hungarians (Edited and translated by László Veszprémy and Frank Schaer with a study by Jenő Szűcs) (1999). CEU Press. ISBN 963-9116-31-9.
- Bak, János M.; Veszprémy, László; Kersken, Norbert (2018). Chronica de gestis Hungarorum e codice picto saec. XIV [The Illuminated Chronicle: Chronicle of the deeds of the Hungarians from the fourteenth-century illuminated codex]. Budapest: Central European University Press. ISBN 978-9-6338-6264-3.

=== Secondary sources ===
- Studies on the Illuminated Chronicle (2018). Bak, János M.; Veszprémy, László (eds.). Studies on the Illuminated Chronicle. Budapest: Central European University Press, National Széchényi Library. ISBN 978-963-386-261-2. ISSN 1419-7782.
- Györffy, György (2013). István király és műve [King Stephen and his work] (in Hungarian). Balassi Kiadó. ISBN 978-963-506-896-8.
- Kristó, Gyula (1988). A vármegyék kialakulása Magyarországon [The Development of the Counties in Hungary] (in Hungarian). Magvető Kiadó. ISBN 963-14-1189-3.
- Kristó, Gyula (2001). "Szabolcs vezér [Chieftain Szabolcs]". A Nyíregyházi Jósa András Múzeum évkönyve (in Hungarian). 43: 265–270. ISSN 0547-0196.
- Mályusz, Elemér (1967). A Thuróczy-krónika és forrásai [The Thuróczy Chronicle and its Sources] (in Hungarian). Budapest: Tudománytörténeti tanulmányok 5, Hungarian Academy of Sciences.
- Mályusz, Elemér (1971). Az V. István-kori geszta [The Gesta of the Age of Stephen V]. Akadémiai Kiadó.
- Németh, Péter (1990). "Szabolcs vezér alakja középkori kútfőinkben és a történeti irodalomban [The Figure of Chieftain Szabolcs in Medieval Narratives and Historical Literature]". Agria (in Hungarian). 25–26. Dobó István Vármúzeum: 311–316. ISSN 0236-9168.
- Pop, Ioan-Aurel (1996). Romanians and Hungarians from the 9th to the 14th Century: The Genesis of the Transylvanian Medieval State. Centrul de Studii Transilvane, Fundația Culturală Română. ISBN 973-577-037-7.
- Tóth, Sándor László (2015). A magyar törzsszövetség politikai életrajza [A Political Biography of the Hungarian Tribal Federation] (in Hungarian). Belvedere Meridionale. ISBN 978-615-5372-39-1.
