= Everard II of Breteuil =

Everard II of Breteuil (fl. 1073–1096) was a count of Breteuil-sur-Noye and viscount of Chartres who renounced his inheritance to become a monk. As the eldest son of Everard I of Breteuil and his wife Humberge, he was the head of the House of Breteuil. He succeeded his father sometime between 1061 and 1073.

Guibert of Nogent, who knew Everard personally, called him "a man famous among the foremost of France". Only one undated document—a charter of Bishop Gauthier Saveyr of Meaux—records Everard's brief tenure as viscount of Chartres. In 1073, Everard experienced a religious conversion. Dispersing his gold and silver among the poor and giving his lands to his kin, he withdrew from the world to travel as a poor pilgrim before entering the abbey of Marmoutier. He travelled abroad and worked for a time as a charcoal burner. He gave Marmoutier his half of Nottonville. This donation was confirmed by King Philip I in 1075 and by Count Theobald III of Blois in 1076. Everard and his wife had no children. His brother Hugh I of Le Puiset, who owned the other half of Nottonville, succeeded him as viscount. His brother Waleran succeeded him at Breteuil.

Guibert, writing around 1120, devoted a chapter of his Monodiae to Everard's conversion. He saw Everard as the model for the conversion of Count Simon of Crépy in 1077. Another account of the conversion is found in a charter of the abbey that is preserved as an original document. When Everard returned from his wanderings and attempted to enter Marmoutier, he was rejected because he had not obtained the consent of his wife. Abbot Bartholomew personally went to the castle of Le Puiset to negotiate her consent. In the winter of 1095–1096, when Everard learned that his nephew, Everard III, was planning to join the First Crusade, Everard II reached out to him for a donation to Marmoutier. With his abbot's permission, he met his nephew at Blois sometime before February 1096.

== Bibliography ==
- Dion, Adolphe de (1884). Les seigneurs de Bretheuil en Beauvoises. Paris.
- Iogna-Prat, Dominique (2002). "Évrard de Breteuil et son double: Morphologie de la conversion en milieu aristocratique (v. 1070–v. 1120)". In M. Lauwers (ed.). Guerriers et moines: Conversion et sainteté aristocratiques dans l'Occident médiéval (IX^{e}–XII^{e} siècle). Collection d'études médiévales de Nice. Vol. 4. Brepols. pp. 537–557. doi:10.1484/m.cem-eb.4.2017047. ISBN 978-2-904110-35-1.
- Mabille, Émile (1874). Cartulaire de Marmoutier pour le Dunois. Henri Lecesne.
- Riley-Smith, Jonathan (1997). The First Crusaders, 1095–1131. Cambridge University Press.
