= Ispán =

Nobleman equivalent to count in the Hungarian kingdom

The ispán or count (Hungarian: ispán, Latin: comes or comes parochialis, and Slovak: župan), deriving from title of župan, was the leader of a castle district (a fortress and the royal lands attached to it) in the Kingdom of Hungary from the early 11th century. Most of them were also heads of the basic administrative units of the kingdom, called counties, and from the 13th century the latter function became dominant. The ispáns were appointed and dismissed by either the monarchs or a high-ranking royal official responsible for the administration of a larger territorial unit within the kingdom. They fulfilled administrative, judicial and military functions in one or more counties.

Heads of counties were often represented locally by their deputies, the vice-ispáns (Hungarian: alispán, Latin: vicecomes and Slovak: podžupan) from the 13th century. Although the vice-ispáns took over more and more functions from their principals, the ispáns or rather, according to their new title, the lord-lieutenants of counties (Hungarian: főispán, Latin: supremus comes) remained the leading officials of county administration. The heads of two counties, Pozsony and Temes were even included among the "barons of the realm", along with the palatine and other dignitaries. On the other hand, some of these high-ranking officials and some of the prelates were ex officio ispáns of certain counties, including Esztergom, Fehér and Pest until the 18th or 19th centuries. Between the middle of the 15th century and the 18th century, neither was unusual. Another type of perpetual ispánate, namely the group of counties where the office of ispán was hereditary in noble families.

Election of the vice-ispáns by the assembly of the counties was enacted in 1723, although the noblemen could only choose among four candidates presented by the lord-lieutenant. Following the Austro-Hungarian Compromise of 1867, vice-ispáns officially took over the responsibility for the management of the whole county administration, but lord-lieutenants presided the most important representative or supervising bodies of the counties. Both offices were abolished with the introduction of the Soviet system of local administration in Hungary in 1950.

== Etymology ==
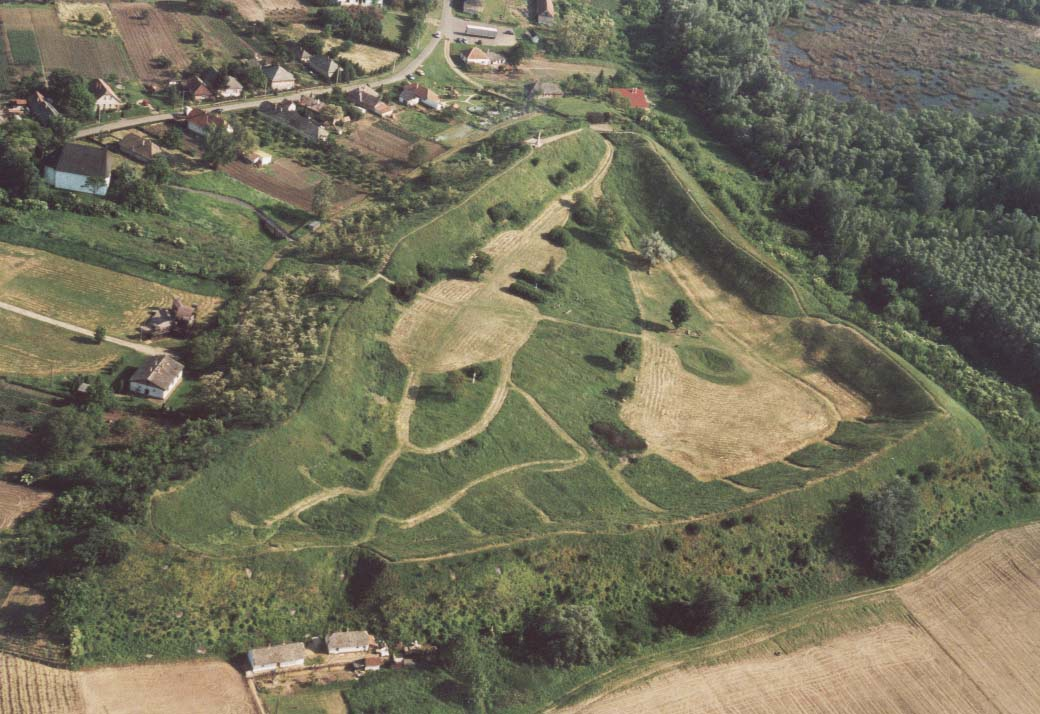
Remains of the fortress at Szabolcs

"If a warrior, scorning the just judgment of his ispán appeals to the king, seeking to prove the injustice of the ispán, he will owe ten pensae of gold to the ispán. "

— Laws of King Stephen I II:8

The Hungarian word is first attested as a proper name from 1269, and as a title from around 1282. The Hungarian word ispán is connected with the term župan ('head of a župa') in the Croatian and modern Slovak, and to the synonymous Old Church Slavonic expression, županъ. Accordingly, the title seems to be a Slavic loanword in Hungarian.

However, Dorota Dolovai sees a direct borrowing problematic from phonological perspective and also András Róna-Tas says that the omission of the vowel u during the procedure (župan>špan>išpan) suggests an intermediate (non-Slavic) language. Several Slavists have a different opinion. Slovak Slavist Šimon Ondruš explains the intermediate form špán as derived from žьpan by the extinction of Proto-Slavic ь and phonetic assimilation of the first letter. This is supported also by the fact that the form župan is not historically documented in the Slovak and the form used until the 15th century was exactly špán (župan is most likely only a late borrowing introduced by the Štúr's generation). Ondruš does not exclude the possibility of borrowing from South Slavic languages instead of Slovak, but according to Pukanec Croatian and Slovenian are less probable candidates since they preserved the form župan.

== Origins ==
The office had already existed under Stephen I (997–1038) at the latest, who was crowned the first king of Hungary in 1000 or 1001. The new king introduced an administrative system based on fortresses. Most of the fortresses were "simple earthworks crowned by a wooden wall and surrounded by a ditch and bank" (Pál Engel) in the period. Stone castles were only erected at Esztergom, Székesfehérvár and Veszprém. Archaeological evidence shows that a few castles had already existed in the last quarter of the 10th century, implying that the new system of local administration was set up in the reign of Stephen I's father, Grand Prince Géza (c. 972–997).

The monarch appointed a royal official styled comes in contemporary documents at the head of each fortress. A comes was the chief administrator of royal estates attached to the castle under his command. Consequently, he was the principal of all who owned services to the head of that castle.

Most comes (about 50 out of a total number of 72 by the 13th century) also had authority over the population of the wider region surrounding the castle, including those who lived in their own properties or in lands owned by other individuals or ecclesiastic bodies. Each district of this type formed an administrative unit with "well defined boundaries" (Pál Engel) known under the name of vármegye or "county". Some of the castles and accordingly the counties around them were named after their first counts. For instance, both the fortress of Hont and Hont County received the name of a knight of foreign origin, a staunch supporter of Stephen I.

== Middle Ages ==
=== Monarchy of the Árpáds (c. 1000–c. 1300) ===
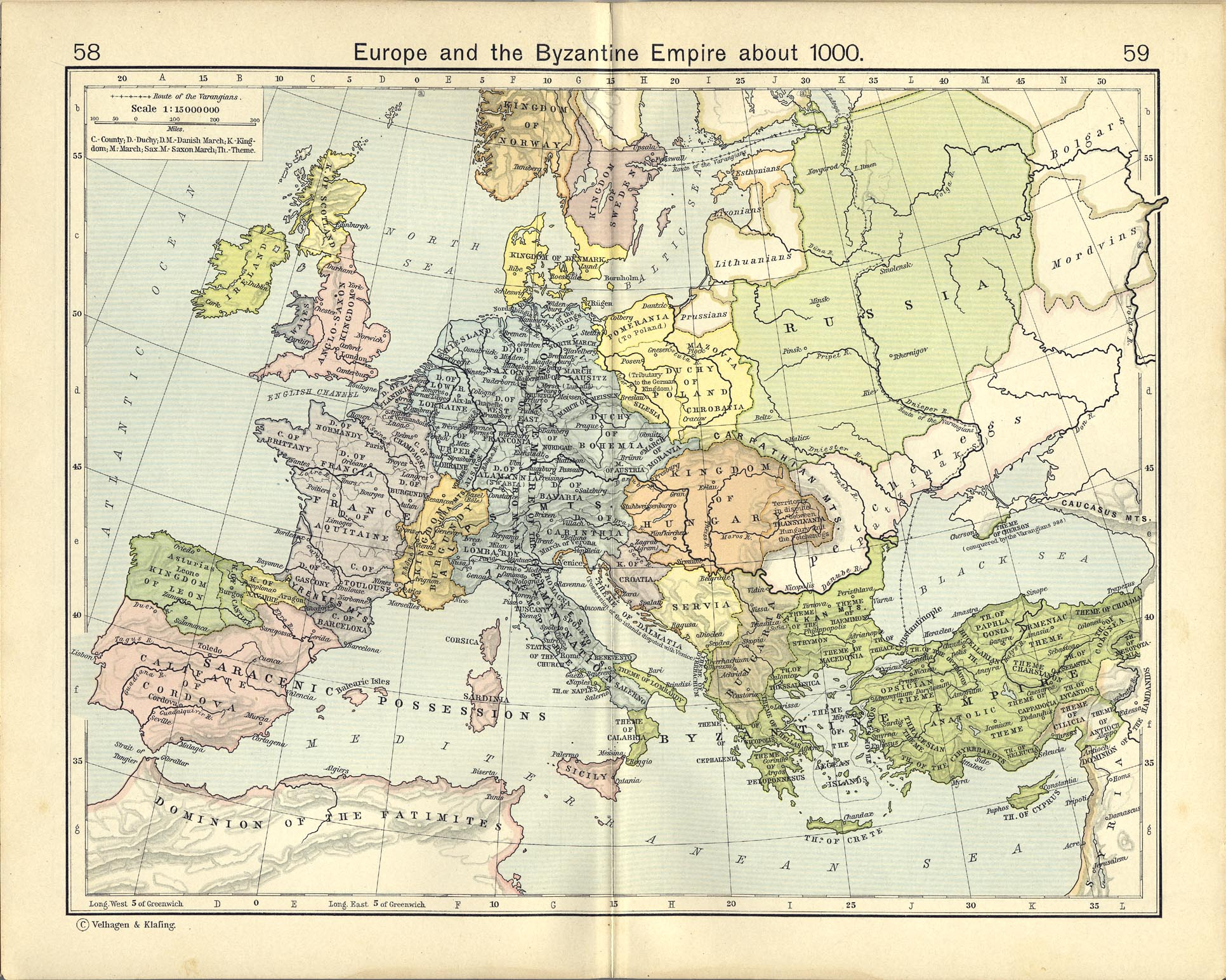
Kingdom of Hungary in medieval Europe (c. 1000)

Each castle district served multiple purposes, accordingly their comes also fulfilled several tasks. First of all, the military of the kingdom was for centuries based on troops raised in the castle districts, each commanded by the comes under his own banner. He was assisted by the castellan and other officers recruited among the "castle warriors". Castle warriors were commoners who owned military service to the comes as the local representative of royal power in regard to their landholding in the castle district.

Castles and the estates attached to them were important economic units. Initially, a significant part of all lands in the kingdom (maybe as much as two thirds thereof) belonged to a royal castle. However, not all parcels in the "castle lands" was part of the royal domain (the monarchs' private property). On the other hand, huge woodlands owned by the monarch and his kin remained outside of the system of castle districts. Officials responsible for the management of the forested lands, the "royal keepers" never equalled the heads of castle districts in rank, although they were also styled ispán in the 12th century. The royal woodlands developed into counties by the end of the next century.

The "castle folk", that is peasants living in a village of a castle district, provided with food, wine, weapons or other goods the comes of the castle and his retinue. They were grouped into units called "hundreds", each supervised by a "centurion". Centurions were always appointed by the comes from among the castle warriors. Counts were also responsible for collecting taxes, tolls and customs. They only forwarded two thirds of the income deriving from these levies to the king, the income's remaining part was due to them. The grant of castle lands to individuals began to erodate the economic functions of castle districts already in the 12th century. King Andrew II (1205–1235) was the first monarch to distribute large parcels among his followers, which "undermined the social and military organisation upon which the prestige of the counts" rested (Pál Engel). Royal monopoly of holding castles was abolished under King Béla IV (1235–1270). Hundreds of new castles were built in this period by noblemen.

"The [ispáns] of counties shall not render judicial sentences concerning the estates of the servientes except in cases pertaining to coinage and tithes."

— Golden Bull of 1222

Counts were also entitled to render justice in their districts. Heads of a county had jurisdiction over all the inhabitants of that county, but otherwise the counts' jurisdiction only covered the commoners who lived in the estates attached to the castle. Each comes appointed his own judicial deputy to assist him. However, more and more landowners received immunity from the jurisdiction of the comes from the monarchs. Furthermore, a rebellion of the so-called "royal servants" (in fact landowners directly subjected to the sovereign) forced King Andrew II to issue a charter known as the Golden Bull of 1222 which exempted them of the jurisdiction of the ispáns. The development of towns set further limits to the counts' authority, since at least 20 settlements received the right to self-government under King Béla IV (1235–1270).

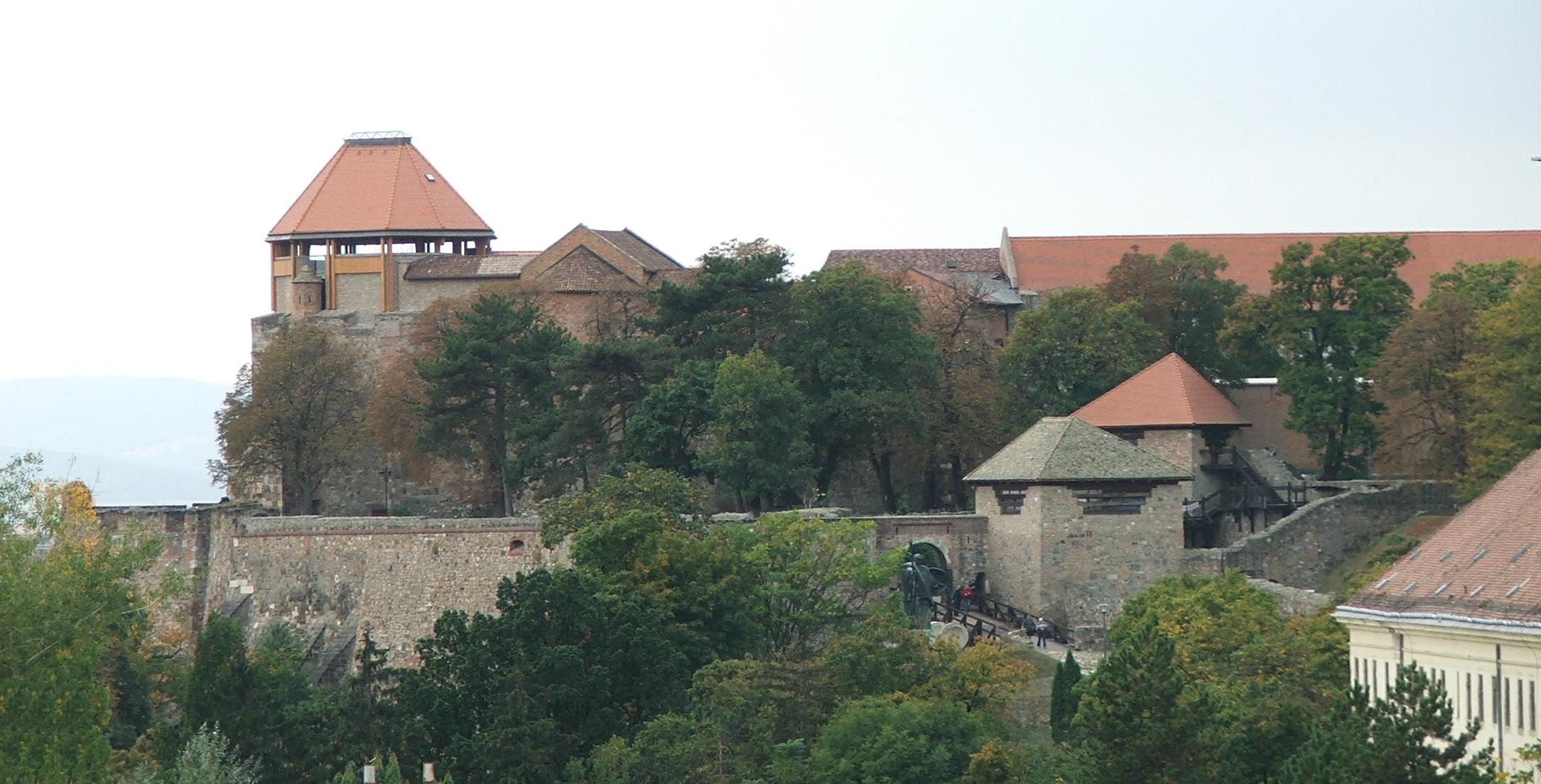
Castle of Esztergom

Counties were developing from an institute of royal administration into a body of self-government of the local noblemen in the course of the 13th century, but the ispán, "a royal appointee" (Erik Fügedi) remained their heads. Accordingly, the ispáns supervised the activities of the judges elected by the community of local noblemen with the task to "revise existing property rights" (Pál Engel) in many counties in Transdanubia in 1267. The existence of the institution of elected "judges of the nobles" is documented in more and more counties from the 1280s. Legislation prescribed that the ispán was to pass judgement with four judges elected by the local nobility from among their number.

Heads of the counties, along with the prelates of the realm, were ex officio members of the royal council. An advisory body, laws were enacted with the consent of the royal council, as the first king emphasized. The heads of the Transylvanian counties were controlled by a great official of the realm, the voivode, instead of the monarch from the 12th century. Similarly, the ispáns of some Slavonian counties were appointed and dismissed by the bans, the highest-ranking royal officials in that province. The earliest "perpetual ispánates" emerged around the same time: the voivodes were also the ispáns of Fehér County from around 1200, the vice-palatines were the heads of Pest County from the 1230s, and the archbishops of Esztergom held the office of ispán of Esztergom County from 1270.

=== Late Middle Ages (c. 1300–1526) ===
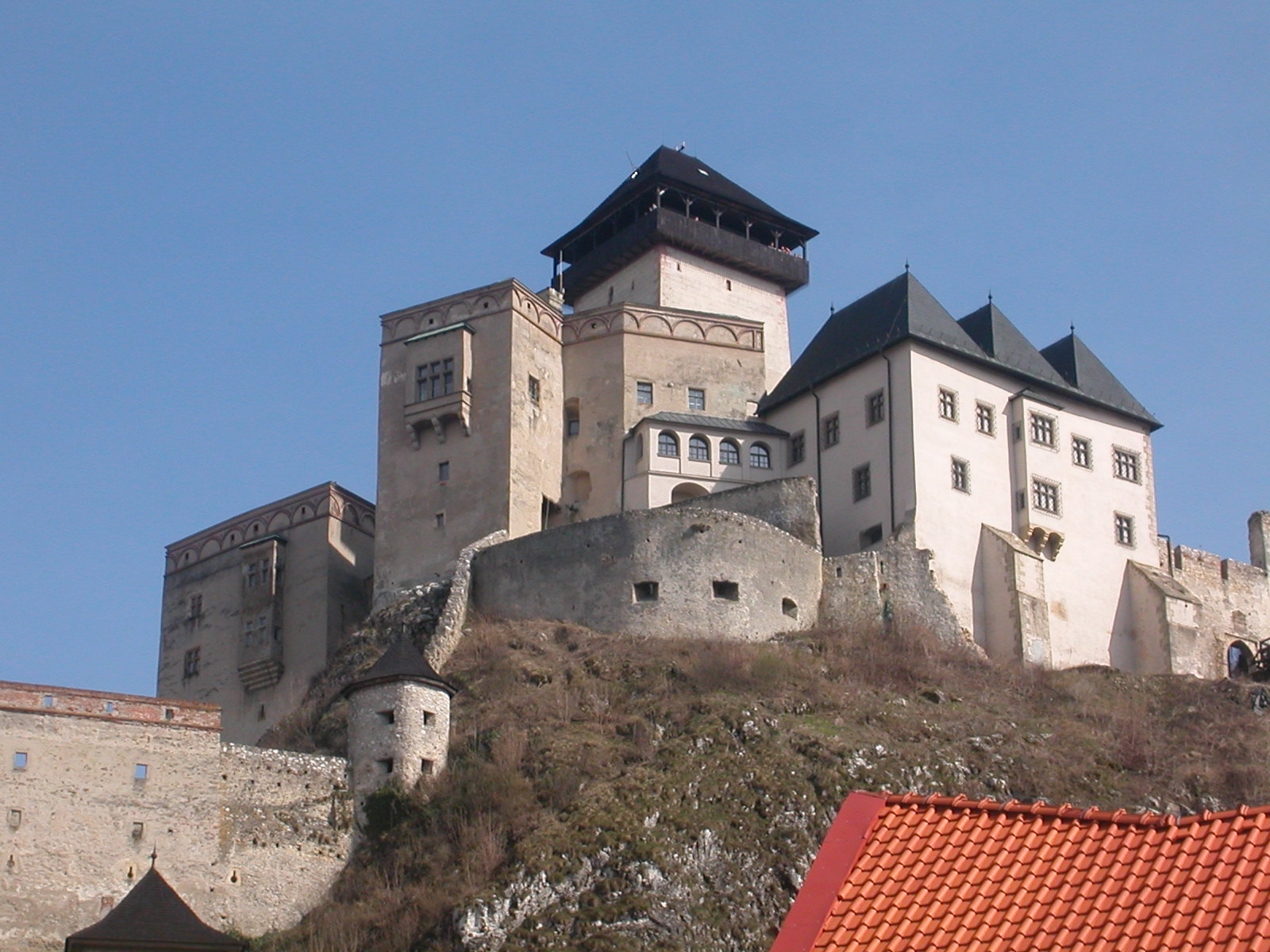
Trencsén Castle (Trenčín, Slovakia), seat of Matthew Csák

Large territories of the Kingdom of Hungary were put under the authority of powerful landlords by the time when King Andrew III, the last member of the Árpád dynasty died on January 14, 1301. For instance, Matthew Csák ruled over 14 counties in the wider region of the river Váh (Hungarian: Vág, now Slovakia), Ladislaus Kán administered Transylvania, and members of the Kőszegi family ruled in Transdanubia. Royal power was only restored by King Charles I in a series of wars against the "oligarchs" lasting up to the 1320s.

The monarch also succeeded in both acquiring a number of castles and increasing the territory of the royal domain, thus a new network of castle districts emerged. Most of the counties and the castle districts were distributed among the great officers of the realm in the following period as honours attached to their dignity. For instance, the palatines William Drugeth and Nicholas Kont were also ispáns of five counties under Kings Charles I and Louis I, respectively. In this period, all income from an honour was due to its holder.

County courts were headed by the ispáns or by their deputies. First of all, ispáns were responsible for enforcing the judgements of the county courts, although in his absence the court appointed one or two noblemen to fulfill this task. Initially, county courts were only authorized to pass capital punishment against criminals caught in the county, but more and more noblemen received the ius gladii, that is the same right in their own estates, although they "were required to deliver the convict" to the ispán's men (Pál Engel). Furthermore, magnates were granted the right to judge noblemen living in their own household, although only with the previous authorization by the ispán in 1486.

== Re-establishment (2023–) ==
As of January 1, 2023, the Parliament of Hungary brought back the official and legal usage of titles such as ispán, reinstituted the formerly banned medieval designations and titles.

== See also ==
- County (Kingdom of Hungary)
- Župa
