= Chaumont-en-Vexin =

- Commune
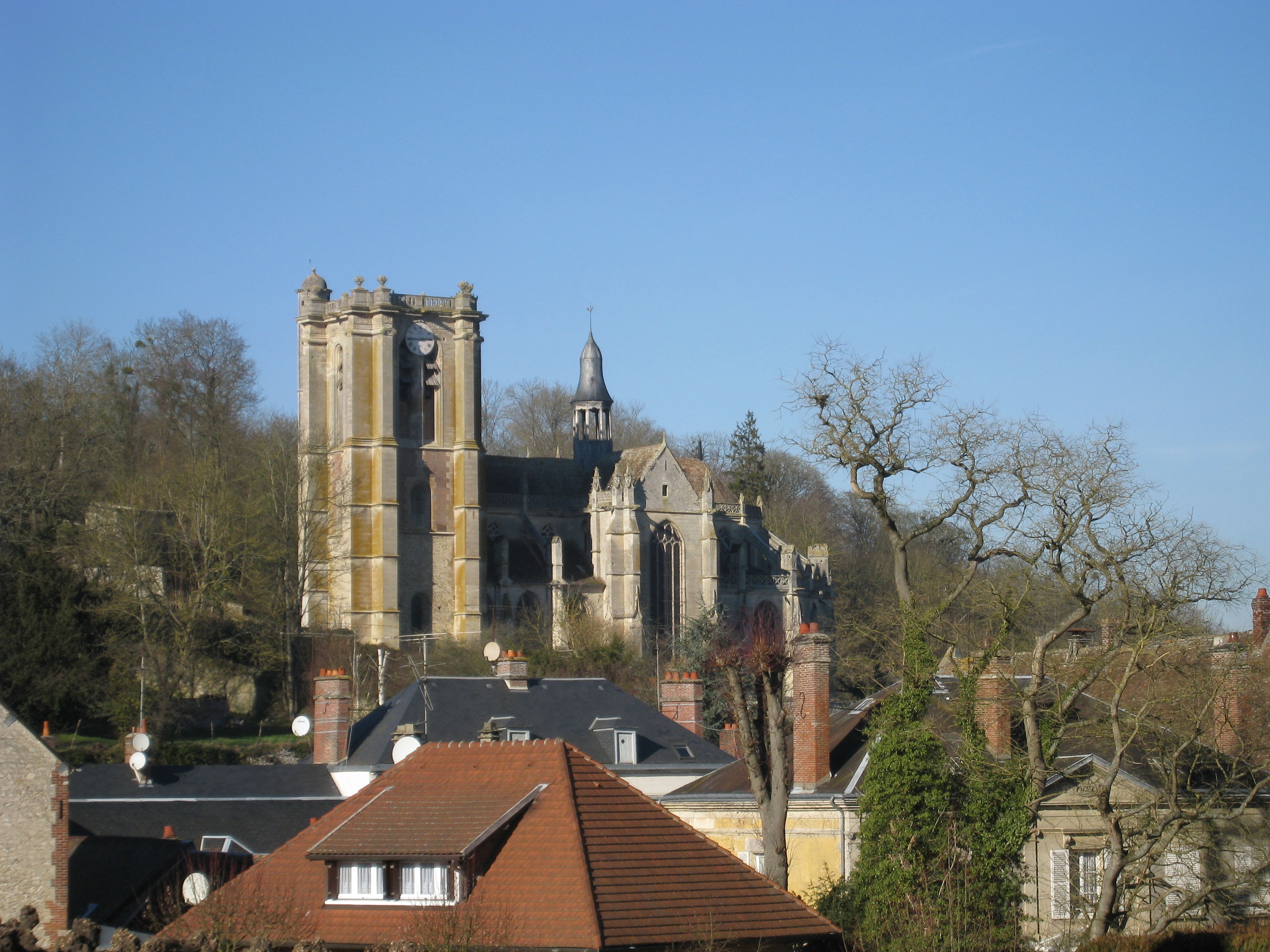
- The church in Chaumont-en-Vexin
- Location of Chaumont-en-Vexin
- Location within France Location within Hauts-de-France
- Coordinates: 49°16′06″N 1°53′23″E
- Country: France
- Region: Hauts-de-France
- Department: Oise
- Arrondissement: Beauvais
- Canton: Chaumont-en-Vexin
- Intercommunality: Vexin Thelle

Government
  - Mayor (2020–2026): Emmanuelle Lamarque
- Area^{1}: 18.54 km^{2} (7.16 sq mi)
- Elevation: 69 m (226 ft)
- Highest elevation: 144 m (472 ft)
- Lowest elevation: 57 m (187 ft)
- Population (2023): 3,338
  - Density: 180.0/km^{2} (466.3/sq mi)
- Time zone: UTC+01:00 (CET)
  - Summer (DST): UTC+02:00 (CEST)
- INSEE/Postal code: 60143 /60240
- ^{1} French Land Register data, which excludes lakes, ponds, glaciers > 1 km^{2} (0.386 sq mi or 247 acres) and river estuaries.

Chaumont-en-Vexin (French pronunciation: [ʃomɔ̃ ɑ̃ vɛksɛ̃], literally Chaumont in Vexin) is a commune in the Oise department in northern France.

== Population ==
Historical population
| Year | Pop. | ±% p.a. |
|---|---|---|
| 1968 | 1,889 | — |
| 1975 | 2,027 | +1.01% |
| 1982 | 2,697 | +4.16% |
| 1990 | 2,965 | +1.19% |
| 1999 | 3,078 | +0.42% |
| 2007 | 3,047 | −0.13% |
| 2012 | 3,112 | +0.42% |
| 2017 | 3,269 | +0.99% |
| 2023 | 3,338 | +0.35% |
Source: INSEE

== Rulers ==
- Walo II (*1060; † 1098), viscount of Chaumont-en-Vexin and constable of King Philip I of France

== See also ==
- Communes of the Oise department
- Vexin
