= Walo II of Chaumont-en-Vexin =

Walo II (Galon II de Beaumont) (*1060; † 1098) was a viscount of Chaumont-en-Vexin and a constable of King Philip I of France.

== Biography ==
He was son of Odo (Eudes) de Beaumont, viscount of Chaumont-en-Vexin. He took a part at the First Crusade as part of the army of Hugh the Great that attempted to capture the Holy Lands, called by Pope Urban II in 1095. Walo was killed by the Turks during the Siege of Antioch on 20 May 1098.

== Family ==
Walo was married to Humberge of Le Puiset, a sister of Everard of Le Puiset, both from the prominent Île-de-France family of Hugh I of Le Puiset. Walo and Humberge had three children:

- Drogo (Dreux) de Chaumont (d. after 1099), a Crusader in the first Crusade and in 1099 a monk at the Abbey of Saint-Germer.
- Hugues "Panis avena", Provost at Saint-Germer, beginning in 1115
- Humberge (d. before 1089).

Drogo was the ancestor of the later counts of Dammartin, his great-grandson Jean, Châtelain de Trie, marrying Alix de Dammartin, daughter of Alberic III, Count of Dammartin.

== Sources ==
Riley-Smith, Jonathan, The First Crusaders, 1095–1131, Cambridge University Press, 1997
