= Everard I of Breteuil =

Everard I of Breteuil (died 12 February 1066), son of Gilduin, Count of Breteuil and Viscount of Chartres, and his wife Emmeline. Everard was the patriarch of the Le Puiset family which produced a large number of participants in the First Crusade. The Le Puisets were closely aligned with the family of Montlhéry through the marriage of his third son Hugh to the daughter of Guy I of Montlhéry.

Everard married Humberge, who may have been the sister of the wife of Hugh Bardoul of Broyes. Everard and Humberge had seven children:

- Everard II of Breteuil (d. after 1105), Count of Breteuil, Viscount of Chartres. Married Adelais de la Ferté-Baudouin. In 1073, Everard went on a pilgrimage to the Holy Land and upon his return joined the abbey of Marmoutier.
- Adelaide de Breteuil (d. 1073 or after)
- Waleran I of Breteuil (d. after 25 February 1084)
- Hugh I of Le Puiset (d. 23 December 1096 or after), Châtelain of Puiset, Viscount of Chartres. Married Alice of Montlhéry, daughter of Guy I of Montlhéry and Hodierna of Gometz.
- Robert of Breteuil (d. 5 November 1077), Abbot of Breteuil
- Adelaide of Breteuil, married, as his second wife, Roger of Montgomerie, 1st Earl of Shrewsbury
- Eremburge, married Rivallon I, Seigneur de Dol.

Everard's descendants would become a family, particularly the descendants of Hugh, that was known for its savagery during the Crusades, as reported by Abbot Suger of St. Denis. Everard's eldest son and namesake, as head of the family, did not take the cross, instead giving up his lands and possessions, entering the abbey of Marmoutier.

== Sources ==
- La Monte, John L. (January 1942). "The Lords of Le Puiset on the Crusades". Speculum.
- Riley-Smith, Jonathan (1997). The First Crusaders, 1095-1131. Cambridge University Press.
- Stark, Rodney (September 2003). "Upper Class Asceticism: Social Origins of Ascetic Movements and Medieval Saints". Review of Religious Research. 45 (1). doi:10.2307/3512496. JSTOR 3512496.

== See also ==
- The Houses of Montlhéry and Le Puiset.
