= Sophia of Hungary =

Sophia of Hungary may refer to:

- Sophia of Hungary, Duchess of Saxony (c. 1050–1095), daughter of King Béla I, wife of Margrave Ulric I of Carniola, and wife of Duke Magnus of Saxony
- Sophia (Coloman of Hungary's daughter)
- Sophia of Hungary (nun), daughters of King Béla II
