= Treaty of Caen =

1091 agreement between King William II of England and Robert Curthose, Duke of Normandy

The Treaty of Caen was signed in Caen, France, in 1091 between William II of England and his brother, Duke Robert Curthose of Normandy. The treaty was made before the initiation of any military engagements. Based on the terms of the accord, William II and Robert Curthose agreed to cease their rivalry. In the end, England was left with several territories in Normandy such as the counties of Eu, Aumale, and Cherbourg. England also received Fécamp Abbey and the territory of Gournay. The Council of Caen eventually declared all altercations settled in August 1091.

== See also ==
- List of treaties
