= Synod of Szabolcs =

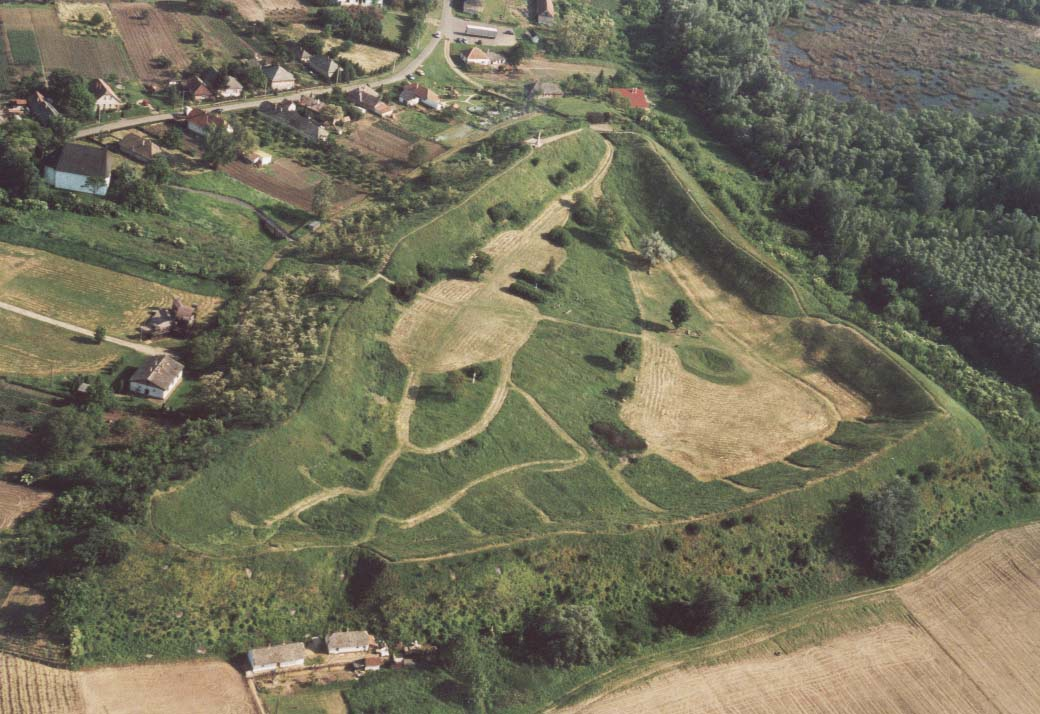
Aerial view of the fortress of Szabolcs

The synod of Szabolcs was an assembly of the prelates of the Kingdom of Hungary which met at the fortress of Szabolcs on 21 May 1092. It was presided over by King Ladislaus I of Hungary. The synod passed decrees which regulated the life of both clergymen and laymen, several aspects of liturgy and Church administration and the relationships between Christians, Jews and Muslims.

== Sources ==
- Berend, Nora; Laszlovszky, József; Szakács, Béla Zsolt (2007). "The kingdom of Hungary". In Berend, Nora (ed.). Christianization and the Rise of Christian Monarchy: Scandinavia, Central Europe and Rus', c. 900-1200. Cambridge University Press. pp. 319–368. ISBN 978-0-521-87616-2.
- Engel, Pál (2001). The Realm of St Stephen: A History of Medieval Hungary, 895–1526. I.B. Tauris Publishers. ISBN 1-86064-061-3.
- Kosztolnyik, Z. J. (1981). Five Eleventh Century Hungarian Kings: Their Policies and their Relations with Rome. Boulder. ISBN 0-914710-73-7.
