= Chen Yuyi =

Chinese poet and politician (1090–1138)

- 陳與義
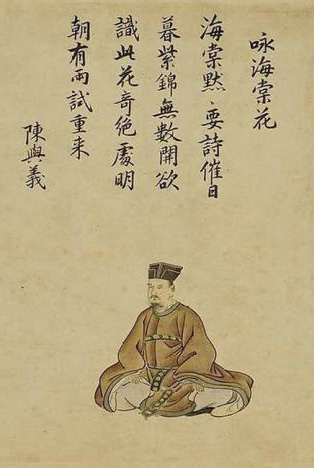
- Chen Yuyi, painted by Kanō Tsunenobu in the 18th century.
- Born: 1090; Luoyang, Henan, Northern Song dynasty
- Died: 1138 (aged 47–48); Hangzhou, Zhejiang, Southern Song dynasty
- Occupations: Poet, politician

Chinese name
- Traditional Chinese: 陳與義
- Simplified Chinese: 陈与义
Transcriptions
Standard Mandarin
- Hanyu Pinyin: Chén Yǔyì

Qufei
- Chinese: 去非
Transcriptions
Standard Mandarin
- Hanyu Pinyin: Qūfeī

Jianzhai
- Traditional Chinese: 簡齋
- Simplified Chinese: 简斋
Transcriptions
Standard Mandarin
- Hanyu Pinyin: Jiǎnzhaī

Chen Yuyi (Chinese: 陳與義; 1090–1138), courtesy name Qufei, art name Jianzhai, was a Chinese poet and politician of the Song dynasty.

== Biography ==
Chen was born in Luoyang, Henan in 1090 to an official family, with his ancestral home in Jingzhao (today's Xi'an). After he acquired his jinshi in the Imperial examination in 1113, he was assigned to the central government. He retired in 1116. Two years later he returned to the operating post. In 1120, Chen was in mourning at home after his mother died. Two years later, he became an official in the central government under the recommendation of Ge Shengzhong (葛胜仲; 葛勝仲).

In 1127, the Jin army seized Bianjing (today's Kaifeng, Henan), the Song army was routed. After the perdition of the Northern Song dynasty, Emperor Gaozong fled to Shaoxing and established the Southern Song dynasty. Chen fled with his family, moving from Hubei, to Hunan, and then Guangdong, and ending up in Fujian. In 1131, he came to Lin'an, capital of Southern Song dynasty. He was appointed as an official in the newly founded central government. He died in 1138, aged 49.

His biography was included in the History of Song.

== Bibliography ==
- Toqto'a; Alutu (2014). 《宋史》 [History of Song] (in Chinese). Vol. 445. Beijing: Zhong Hua Book Company. ISBN 9787101003239.
