= Zishou Miaozong =

Chinese Zen master and poet

Zishou Miaozong (資壽妙總; 1095–1170) was a Chinese Zen master and poet. Her grandfather Su Song (1020–1101) was a chancellor. She studied with Zhenxie Qingliao and Dahui Zonggao, who named her Wuzhuo ("No attachment"). This became the basis of the name by which she would later be known: Wuzhuo Daoren, "Woman of the way no attachments". She served on order of magistrate Zhang Anguo abbess and Zen teacher of the Ceshou nunnery.
