= 1154 =

1154 in various calendars
- Gregorian calendar: 1154; MCLIV
- Ab urbe condita: 1907
- Armenian calendar: 603; ԹՎ ՈԳ
- Assyrian calendar: 5904
- Balinese saka calendar: 1075–1076
- Bengali calendar: 560–561
- Berber calendar: 2104
- English Regnal year: 19 Ste. 1 – 1 Hen. 2
- Buddhist calendar: 1698
- Burmese calendar: 516
- Byzantine calendar: 6662–6663
- Chinese calendar: 癸酉年 (Water Rooster); 3851 or 3644 — to — 甲戌年 (Wood Dog); 3852 or 3645
- Coptic calendar: 870–871
- Discordian calendar: 2320
- Ethiopian calendar: 1146–1147
- Hebrew calendar: 4914–4915
- Hindu calendars
- Vikram Samvat: 1210–1211
- Shaka Samvat: 1075–1076
- Kali Yuga: 4254–4255
- Holocene calendar: 11154
- Igbo calendar: 154–155
- Iranian calendar: 532–533
- Islamic calendar: 548–549
- Japanese calendar: Ninpei 4 / Kyūju 1 (久寿元年)
- Javanese calendar: 1060–1061
- Julian calendar: 1154; MCLIV
- Korean calendar: 3487
- Minguo calendar: 758 before ROC 民前758年
- Nanakshahi calendar: −314
- Seleucid era: 1465/1466 AG
- Thai solar calendar: 1696–1697
- Tibetan calendar: ཆུ་མོ་བྱ་ལོ་ (female Water-Bird); 1280 or 899 or 127 — to — ཤིང་ཕོ་ཁྱི་ལོ་ (male Wood-Dog); 1281 or 900 or 128

Map of the Kingdom of Sicily (1154)

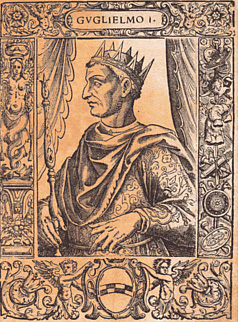
King William I of Sicily (r. 1154–1166)

Year 1154 (MCLIV) was a common year starting on Friday of the Julian calendar.

== Events ==
=== By place ===
==== Levant ====
- April 18 – Nur al-Din, Seljuk ruler (atabeg) of Aleppo, encamps before Damascus and overthrows Mujir al-Din by force with support of the Jewish citizens, who open the eastern gate to the bulk of his army. Mujir flees to the citadel, but capitulates after only a few hours. He is offered his life and the Emirate of Homs. A few weeks later Mujir is suspected of plotting with old friends in Damascus and is exiled to Baghdad. Damascus is annexed to Zangid territory and all of Syria is unified under the authority of Nur al-Din, from Edessa in the north to the Hauran to the south.
- Nur al-Din establishes the Al-Nuri Hospital in Damascus. The hospital has outpatient consulting rooms, a conference room, prayer hall, vestibules and bathrooms.

==== Europe ====
- February 26 – King Roger II dies at Palermo after a 24-year reign. He is succeeded by his fourth son William I ("the Bad"') as ruler of Sicily. William appoints Maio of Bari, a man of low birth, to chancellor and his adviser. He pursues his father's policy of strengthening authority over the towns and the Italian nobles, who rally around his cousin Robert III, count of Loritello, in Apulia and Calabria.
- Autumn – King Frederick Barbarossa, Holy Roman Emperor, leads an expedition into Italy for his imperial coronation. He wants to impose his will upon the towns and cities of Lombardy, a region long accustomed to interference from Germany. Frederick encounters stiff resistance to his authority, the Lombard nobles are unwilling to acknowledge his rule and the rights to raise taxes.
- The Almohad army conquers the last independent Muslim stronghold at Granada (modern Spain), after a six year siege.
- The Banate of Bosnia becomes an autonomous duchy as part of the Lands of the Hungarian Crown.
- Tallinn, the capital of Estonia, is first marked on the world map by Muhammad al-Idrisi.

==== England ====
- October 25 – King Stephen dies after a short illness at Dover. He is succeeded by Henry of Anjou, the son of Queen Matilda.
- December 19 – The 21-year-old Henry II is crowned as sole ruler of England along with his wife Eleanor of Aquitaine.
- Peter de Bermingham has a charter to hold a market in Birmingham, origin of the Bull Ring.

=== By topic ===
==== Art and Culture ====
- January 15 – Muhammad al-Idrisi, Arab geographer and cartographer, completes his atlas of the world, the Tabula Rogeriana, which will remain one of the most accurate maps until the Age of Discovery.

==== Religion ====
- December 3 – Pope Anastasius IV dies after a 17-month pontificate. He is succeeded by Adrian IV (the only English pope in history) as the 169th pope of the Catholic Church.

== Births ==
- April 13 – Gökböri, Ayyubid general (d. 1233)
- November 2 – Constance I, queen of Sicily (d. 1198)
- November 11 – Sancho I, king of Portugal (d. 1211)
- October 19 – Vsevolod the Big Nest, Grand Prince of Vladimir-Suzdal (d. 1212)
- Kyŏng Taesŭng, Korean military leader (d. 1183)
- Minamoto no Yoshinaka, Japanese general (d. 1184)
- Robert II, count of Dreux and Braine (d. 1218)
- Shihab al-Din Yahya ibn Habash Suhrawardi, Persian philosopher (d. 1191)
- Approximate date
  - Agnes of Austria, queen consort of Hungary (d. 1182)
  - Benoît de Sainte-Maure, French poet (d. 1173)

== Deaths ==
- February 2 – Viacheslav I, Grand Prince of Kiev (b. 1083)
- February 20 – Wulfric of Haselbury, English miracle worker
- February 26 – Roger II, king of Sicily (b. 1095)
- March 8 – Stephen of Obazine, French priest (b. 1085)
- March – Lawrence of Durham, English prelate and poet
- April 1 or 15 – Al-Zafir, Fatimid caliph (b. 1133)
- April 3 – Al-Adil ibn al-Sallar, Fatimid vizier
- June 8 – William of York, English archbishop
- June 9 – Geoffrey of Canterbury, English abbot
- June 20 – Ermengol VI ("el de Castilla"), count of Urgell (b. 1096)
- July 20 – Bernard of Hildesheim, German bishop
- July 21 – Elizabeth of Hungary, Duchess of Greater Poland
- August 12 – Zhang Jun, Chinese general and official (b. 1086)
- September 4 – Gilbert de la Porrée, French theologian
- October 25 – Stephen, king of England (b. 1096)
- November 13 – Iziaslav II, Grand Prince of Kiev
- November 18 – Adelaide of Maurienne, French queen (b. 1092)
- December 3 – Anastasius IV, pope of the Catholic Church
- December 12 – Vicelinus, German bishop (b. 1086)
- Donnchad I, Earl of Fife (or Duncan), Scottish nobleman (b. 1113)
- Faidiva of Toulouse, countess consort of Savoy (b. 1133)
- Hiyya al-Daudi, Andalusian rabbi and composer
- Jinadattasuri, Indian Jain poet and writer (b. 1075)
- Lambert of Vence, bishop (b. 1084)
- Matilda of Anjou, duchess consort of Normandy and abbess (b. 1106)
