= Hugh I of Le Puiset =

Hugh I of Le Puiset (died 23 December 1096), also called Hugues Blavons, was the second son of Everard I of Breteuil and his wife Humberge.

In 1067, taking advantage of the weakness of Philip I of France, he seized the royal castle of Le Puiset and settled there. In 1073, he became viscount of Chartres when his older brother, Everard II, abdicated to become a monk.

Hugh married Alice of Montlhéry, daughter of Guy I, lord of Montlhéry, and Hodierna de Gometz. The family of Montlhéry was also part of the turbulent nobility that King Louis VI would have to put down a generation later. The alliances of the Montlhéry Clan formed a broad network of nobles who engaged heavily in the Crusades.

Hugh and Alice had at least nine children:

- Odeline (d. before 2 November 1107), married Joscelin IV of Lèves, a crusader. Their daughter (name unknown) married Ralph the Red of Pont-Echanfray.
- Éverard III, lord of Puiset, viscount of Chartres
- Hugh II, lord of Puiset, count of Jaffa (as Hugh I of Jaffa)
- Guy (d. 1127 of after), canon of Chartres, lord of Méréville, viscount of Étampes
- Gilduin (d. 1135), monk at Saint-Martin-des-Champs, prior of Lurey-Le-Bourg, abbot of the Abbey of St. Mary of the Valley of Jehosaphatt
- Waleran (Galéran) (d. in prison 1126), made lord of Birecik in 1116 after its capture by Baldwin II. Married the daughter of the previous lord, Abu'lgharib.
- Ralph
- Humberge, married Walo II of Beaumont-sur-Oise, viscount of Chaumont-en-Vexin. Their son Drogo was an early ancestor of the counts of Dammartin.
- Eustachie

Hugh established a priory of Marmountier at Le Puiset. See also the Houses of Montlhéry and Le Puiset.
