= Roger de Montgomery =

Roger de Montgomery may refer to:

- Roger de Montgomery, seigneur of Montgomery (died 1055)
- Roger de Montgomery, 1st Earl of Shrewsbury (died 1094), son of prec.
- Roger the Poitevin (12th century), son of prec.
