= Zhang Jiucheng =

Chinese politician (1092–1159)

Zhang Jiucheng (Chinese: 張九成; pinyin: Zhāng Jǐuchéng; 1092–1159), courtesy name Zishao (子韶), was a Song dynasty politician.

He was a native of Qiantang in Zhejiang. In 1132 came out first of a number of jinshi, examined according to instructions from the Emperor on various topics, and received a post. His sympathies with the people caused him to be unpopular with his superiors, and he was compelled to resign. He was then recommended by Zhao Ding, and was appointed to the Court of Sacrificial Worship; but before long he incurred the odium of Qin Gui, whose peace policy with the Tartars he strenuously opposed. He had been on terms of intimacy with a Buddhist priest, named Zong Guo (宗果); and he was accused of forming an illegal association and slandering the Court. "This man," said the Emperor, "fears nothing and nobody," and sent him into banishment; from which he returned, upon Qin Gui's death, to be Magistrate at Wenzhou. He was canonised as Wenzhong (文忠).
