= Everard III of Le Puiset =

Everard III (killed in Palestine on 21 August 1099), son of Hugh I of Le Puiset and Alice of Montlhéry (daughter of Guy I, lord of Montlhéry). Seigneur of Puiset and Viscount of Chartres.

Everard was in the army of Hugh the Great, that of Stephen of Blois, and then joined with Robert II, Count of Flanders, in the First Crusade. He was instrumental in rallying troops during the siege of Jerusalem and was killed after the capture of Jerusalem.

Everard married Adelaide, Countess of Corbeil, daughter of Bouchard II, Count of Corbeil, and Adelaide de Crécy, Everard and Adelaide had two children:

- Gilduin
- Hugh III (d. 1132), lord of Puiset, Count of Corbeil, Viscount of Chartres, married Agnes of Blois

Upon his death, Everard was succeeded by his son Hugh as Count of Corbeil.

== Sources ==
- Hodgson, Natasha R. (2007). Women, Crusading and the Holy Land in Historical Narrative. The Boydell Press.
- La Monte, John L. (January 1942). "The Lords of Le Puiset on the Crusades". Speculum. JSTOR 2856610
- LoPrete, Kimberly A. (2007). Adela of Blois: Countess and Lord (c.1067-1137). Four Courts Press.
