= Szabolcs (village) =

Coordinates: 48°10′15″N 21°29′33″E

- Interactive map of Szabolcs
- Country: Hungary
- County: Szabolcs-Szatmár-Bereg

Area
  - Total: 5.88 km^{2} (2.27 sq mi)

Population (2001)
  - Total: 431
  - Density: 73.3/km^{2} (190/sq mi)
- Time zone: UTC+1 (CET)
  - Summer (DST): UTC+2 (CEST)
- Postal code: 4467
- Area code: 42

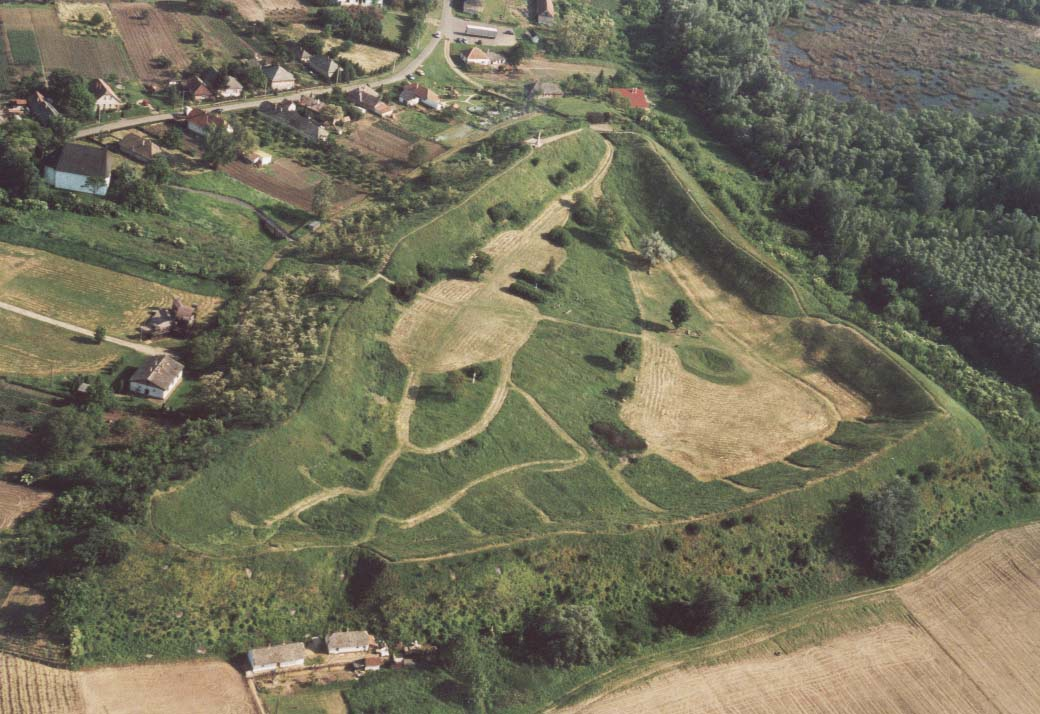
Szabolcs-Earthwork from above

Szabolcs is a village in the county Szabolcs-Szatmár-Bereg in the north-east of Hungary.

It got its name from the Hungarian leader Szabolcs who founded it and settled there in the 9th/10th century. According to Anonymus in the Gesta Hungarorum:

"he saw a place on the shore of the Tisza, and as he saw how [good/strong] it was, [so] he came to the conclusion, that by its strength, it must have been created for building a castle there. Rallying there common folk, he ordered to dig a big moat and ordered to build a quite strong castle of earth. This is now called Castle of Szabolcs".

Either the leader, or the place, which once being the residence of the leader was the center of the region, gave the name to the historical county Szabolcs (which was united later with parts of other counties to Szabolcs-Szatmár-Bereg.
