= 1010s =

Decade

The 1010s was a decade of the Julian Calendar which began on January 1, 1010, and ended on December 31, 1019.

== Events ==
=== By place ===
==== Africa ====
- The Nile river in Egypt freezes over.
- Egyptian military commander Zar'ah ibn Isa ibn Nasturus appointed Vizier of Egypt.

==== Asia ====
- Emperor Lý Thái Tổ of the Lý dynasty moved the capital from Hoa Lư to Thăng Long (modern-day Hanoi).
- Second conflict in the Goryeo–Khitan War: The Goryeo king is unseated in a revolt, resulting in an invasion by the Liao dynasty, and the burning of the Korean capital Gaegyeong.
- Song Zhun of Song dynasty China completes the work of the earlier geographer Lu Duosun, an enormous atlas of China that is written and illustrated in 1,556 chapters, showing maps of each region, city, town, and village (the atlas took 39 years to complete).
- In the Chola dynasty of southern India, the first votes are celebrated by adding a ballot in an urn.

==== Japan ====
- January – Fujiwara no Kenshi (daughter of Michinaga) is married to the imperial heir Crown Prince Okisada.
- February 14 – On the death of Fujiwara no Korechika his daughter, the poet Fujiwara no Chikako, becomes a lady-in-waiting to Empress Shōshi.
- Emperor Ichijō wants to retire – the influential statesman Fujiwara no Michinaga supports Crown Prince Okisada (now his son-in-law), who will be the successor, but the emperor prefers his eldest son by the late Empress Teishi, Prince Atsuyasu, who has been raised by Empress Shōshi, who also supports her stepson, leading to conflict at court.

==== Americas ====
- Viking explorer Thorfinn Karlsefni attempts to found a settlement in North America (approximate date).

==== Europe ====
- June 2 – Fitna of al-Andalus – Battle of Aqbat al-Bakr: The Caliphate of Córdoba is defeated. Allied to Muslim rebels, Ramon Borrell, Count of Barcelona sacks Córdoba, and Hisham II the Nephast is restored as Umayyad caliph of Córdoba, succeeding Muhammad II al-Mahdi.
- The Russian city of Yaroslavl is founded, as an outpost of the principality of Rostov Veliky.
- The fortified city of Fiesole in Italy is captured and destroyed by the people of nearby Florence.
- Swedish king Olof Skötkonung gives city rights to Sigtuna.

=== By topic ===
==== Architecture ====
- The construction of 217 ft (66 m) tall Brihadisvara Temple in Thanjavur (a city now in Tamil Nadu, India) is completed during the Chola dynasty, and at about this time the wall painting Rajaraja I and His Teacher

==== Literature ====
- March 8 – Persian poet Ferdowsi finishes writing the Shahnameh (Book of Kings), which will be regarded as the national epic of the greater Iranian culture.
- Lady Murasaki writes The Tale of Genji in Japanese (approximate date).
- Beowulf is written anonymously in Old English (approximate date).

==== Technology ====
- Eilmer of Malmesbury in England attempts flight in a glider of his own construction.

=== By place ===
==== Europe ====
- June 11 – Lombard Revolt: Mahmoud the Fat of Bari rises up against the Lombard rebels, led by Melus, and delivers the city to Basil Mesardonites, Byzantine governor (catepan) of the Catepanate of Italy. Melus is forced to flee to Salerno, and his brother-in-law Dattus escapes to Monte Cassino, but their families are taken captive, and carted off to Constantinople.
- Autumn – Basil Mesardonites visits Guaimar III of Salerno to secure his cooperation. Melus is forced to flee again. Basil proceeds to Monte Cassino – and persuades Abbot Atenulf to expel Dattus. Pope Sergius IV supports Dattus with papal troops, to garrison the tower on the Garigliano River, a fortified complex in the territory of the Duchy of Gaeta.
- King Henry II enfeoffs Adalbero with Carinthia (including the rule over the March of Verona) after the death of Duke Conrad I.
- The Grand Prince of Kyiv and ruler of Kievan Rus' Vladimir the Great laid the first foundations of Saint Sophia Cathedral, Kyiv.

==== England ====
- September 29 – Siege of Canterbury: Danish Viking raiders led by Thorkell the Tall pillage Canterbury after a siege, taking Ælfheah, archbishop of Canterbury, as a prisoner.
- Byrhtferth, Benedictine monk of Ramsey Abbey, writes his Manual (Enchiridion) on the divine order of the universe and time.

==== Middle East ====
- Ibn al-Haytham (Alhazen), an Arab scientist working in Egypt, feigns madness for fear of angering Caliph Al-Hakim bi-Amr Allah, and is kept under house arrest. During this time he begins writing his influential Book of Optics.
- The Baghdad Manifesto is ordered by Caliph Al-Qadir of the Abbasid Caliphate, in response to the growth of the Fatimid-supporting Ismaili sect of Islam within his borders.

==== Asia ====
- Emperor Ichijō abdicates the throne and dies later after a 25-year reign. He is succeeded by his cousin Sanjō as the 67th emperor of Japan.
- In Vietnam, emperor Lý Thái Tổ personally led a campaign to conquer the Cử Long barbarians. The campaign was a success for the emperor, all the barbarians' camps were burned, and their leaders were brought before the royal court.

=== By place ===
==== Europe ====
- April 12 – Oldřich, Duke of Bohemia, deposes his brother Jaromír, who flees to Poland. Oldřich recognises the suzerainty of King Henry II of Germany over Bohemia. He secures his rule by suppressing the Vršovci insurgents.

==== England ====
- April – King Æthelred the Unready resumes the payment of Danegeld (48,000 pounds of silver) in an attempt to buy off Viking raiders.

==== Ireland ====
- Máel Mórda mac Murchada starts a rebellion against High King Brian Boru in Ireland, which ends in 1014 at the Battle of Clontarf.

==== Scotland ====
- King Malcolm II of Scotland reputedly defeats a Danish army at Cruden Bay.

==== Arabian Empire ====
- Summer – The climax of the Bedouin anti-Fatimid rebellion in Palestine is reached. Abu'l-Futuh al-Hasan ibn Ja'far is acclaimed as anti-Caliph with the title of al-Rashid bi-llah ("Righteous with God").

==== Mexico ====
- The Tepanec tribe settles on the western region of Lake Texcoco. The lineage starts when the Chichimeca chieftain Acolhua marries Cuetlaxochitzin, daughter of Xolotl, another Chichimeca chieftain.

==== Japan ====
- February – Fujiwara no Kenshi, daughter of the powerful court official Fujiwara no Michinaga, is elevated to Empress Consort (Chūgū). The Emperor's first wife, Fujiwara no Seishi, is also elevated to Empress (Kōgō) at the same time but Michinaga ensures that court officials do not attend her ceremony.
- August 12 – Death of Ōe no Masahira, husband of poet and former palace lady-in-waiting Akazome Emon, who writes a number of mourning poems to him.
- Fujiwara no Yorimichi, second son of Fujiwara no Michinaga, marries the daughter of Michinaga's enemy Fujiwara no Kintō, eventually reconciling the families. Another son of Michinaga, Fujiwara no Akinobu, causes scandal by becoming a priest without telling his parents, but they eventually accept his decision.

=== By topic ===
==== Religion ====
- April 19 – Ælfheah, archbishop of Canterbury in England, is murdered by his Danish captors at Greenwich (after refusing to pay a ransom of 3,000 pounds for his release).
- May 12 – Pope Sergius IV dies after a 3-year pontificate at Rome. He is succeeded by Benedict VIII as the 143rd pope of the Catholic Church.
- Approximate date – Camaldolese order established by Romuald in Tuscany.

=== By place ===
==== Europe ====
- King Henry II of Germany signs a peace treaty at Merseburg with Duke Bolesław I the Brave of Poland. As part of the treaty, Bolesław pays homage and recognizes Henry as his overlord in exchange for receiving the March of Lusatia (including the town of Bautzen) and the March of Meissen as fiefs. To seal their peace, Bolesław's son Mieszko II marries Richeza of Lotharingia (granddaughter of the late Emperor Otto II).
- Sulayman ibn al-Hakam reconquers the Caliphate of Córdoba in Al-Andalus (modern Spain) and deposes Hisham II. Sulayman becomes the fifth Umayyad caliph of Córdoba (until 1016).
- Winter – Henry II (anxious to be crowned as Holy Roman Emperor) mobilises a German expeditionary army at Augsburg, to begin his second Italian military campaign.

==== England ====
- Summer – Danish Viking raiders led by Sweyn Forkbeard (accompanied by his son Cnut) sail from Denmark to attack England. Again London defends itself and the Vikings move elsewhere, plundering Wessex, Mercia and Northumbria. King Æthelred the Unready sends his sons Edward and Alfred to Normandy. Æthelred retreats to the Isle of Wight and follows them later into exile.
- December 25 – Sweyn Forkbeard takes control of the Danelaw and is proclaimed king of England in London. Some of the English provinces refuse to pay homage to Sweyn, who has no dynastic right to claim the throne.

==== Asia ====
- September – Emperor Sanjō of Japan visits the home of influential statesman Fujiwara no Michinaga.
- December – Fujiwara no Masanobu, an officer of the guard of empress consort Kenshi of Japan, is killed by Fujiwara no Korekane and Michinaga orders the assassin imprisoned.
- The Four Great Books of Song, the Song dynasty Chinese encyclopedia Prime Tortoise of the Record Bureau which has been compiled since 1005, is completed in 1,000 volumes of 9.4 million written Chinese characters.
- Kaifeng, capital of China, becomes the largest city of the world, taking the lead from Córdoba in Al-Andalus (modern Spain).

=== By topic ===
==== Religion ====
- Æthelred II appoints Lyfing as archbishop of Canterbury in England. He restores Canterbury Cathedral, adding porticus towers and a massive westwork.
- Beauvais changes from a county to a bishopric (approximate date).

=== By place ===
==== Byzantine Empire ====
- Summer – Battle of Thessalonica: Emperor Basil II launches a raiding expedition against Bulgaria. From Western Thrace via Serres he reaches the valley of the Strymon River, near Thessaloniki (modern Greece); the local Byzantine governor Theophylact Botaneiates defeats the Bulgarians.
- July 29 – Battle of Kleidion: Basil II defeats the Bulgarian forces, between the mountains of Belasitsa and Ograzhden, near the town of Kleidon. By order of Basil, almost 15,000 prisoners are blinded; Tsar Samuel survives the battle, but dies of shock. Basil earns the nickname "Bulgar-Slayer".

==== Europe ====
- February 14 – King Henry II arrives at Rome and is crowned Holy Roman Emperor together with his wife Cunigunde by Pope Benedict VIII in St. Peter's Basilica. Henry establishes the Diocese of Bobbio (Northern Italy) and returns to Germany.

==== England ====
- February 3 – King Sweyn Forkbeard dies at Gainsborough after a reign of five weeks. He is succeeded by Harald II who becomes king of Denmark, while Cnut is elected by the Vikings of the Danelaw as king of England.
- March – King Æthelred the Unready sends ambassadors to England, including his own son Edward to negotiate to reclaim of the throne at the invitation of the English nobles.

==== Ireland ====
- April 23 – Battle of Clontarf: Brian Boru, High King of Ireland, defeats a Norse-Irish alliance, although himself killed.

==== Africa ====
- Hammad ibn Buluggin adopts Sunni Islam and declares his independence from the Zirid dynasty (modern Algeria). He recognizes the Abbasid Caliphate in Baghdad as being the rightful caliphs and becomes the first ruler of the Hammadid dynasty (until 1028).

==== Asia ====
- Emperor Sanjō of Japan has an eye illness. Influential statesman Fujiwara no Michinaga schemes to place his 6-year-old grandson Prince Atsuhira on the throne rather than the Emperor's son.
- Rajendra Chola I, king of the Chola dynasty begins his reign. (India)

=== By topic ===
==== Religion ====
- The Nicene-Constantinopolitan Symbol of the Faith is used for the first time during the Roman Mass, after Henry II, the newly crowned Holy Roman Emperor, asks the Pope to add it – together with the filioque clause. Prior to this date, the Creed has not been used at all during the liturgy.
- Wulfstan, archbishop of York in England, preaches his Latin homily Sermo Lupi ad Anglos ("Wulf's Address to the English"), describing the Danes as "God's judgement on England".

=== By place ===
==== Asia ====
- October – Influential Japanese statesman Fujiwara no Michinaga is appointed to be Associate Regent.
- November – The newly constructed Japanese imperial residence burns down.
- Peacocks arrive from the Chinese Song Empire to Fujiwara's mansion in Japan.

==== Europe ====
- July 15 – Vladimir the Great dies at Berestove after a 35-year reign. He is succeeded by his son Sviatopolk I as Grand Prince of Kiev.
- Summer – King Cnut the Great of Denmark launches an invasion of Mercia and Northumbria in England.
- Emperor Henry II launches a German expedition against Duke Bolesław I the Brave. He invades Poland, but is stopped by Bolesław's forces at Krosno, on the Oder River.
- Earl Eric Haakonsson outlaws berserkers in Norway.
- Olaf Haraldsson declares himself King of Norway.

=== By place ===
==== Europe ====
- March 25 – Battle of Nesjar (off the coast of Norway): Olaf Haraldsson is victorious over former co-regent Sweyn Haakonsson, confirming his status as king of Norway.
- April 23 – Æthelred the Unready, king of England, dies after a 38-year reign. He is succeeded by his son Edmund II "Ironside".
- Summer – Battle of Brentford (near London): Edmund Ironside defeats the Danes under King Cnut.
- July 6 – Battle of Pontlevoy: French forces of Fulk III and Herbert I defeat Odo II which determines the balance of power in the Loire Valley.
- October 18 – Battle of Assandun: Cnut defeats Edmund Ironside, leaving the latter as king of Wessex.
- November 30 – Edmund II dies and Cnut takes control of the whole of the Kingdom of England.
- The Pisan and the Genoese republics launch a naval offensive against the Muslim strongholds of Sardinia, in particular Porto Torres, and defeat the fleet of the taifa king of Dénia, Mujāhid al-ʿĀmirī.
- Melus of Bari makes a second attempt against Byzantine-held Southern Italy. To support his cause, he hires Norman mercenaries, unwittingly triggering the rise of Norman rule over southern Italy.
- Georgius Tzul, ruler of Khazaria, is captured by a combined Byzantine Empire–Kievan Rus' force, which effectively ends Khazaria's existence.

==== Arabian Empire ====
- January 7 – Fath al-Qal'i, governor of the Citadel of Aleppo, revolts against Emir Mansur ibn Lu'lu', forcing him to flee. Fath accepts an agreement with Salih ibn Mirdas and takes control of Aleppo.

==== Asia ====
- March 10 – Emperor Sanjō of Japan abdicates the throne after a 5-year reign. He is succeeded by his 7-year-old cousin Go-Ichijō as the 68th emperor of Japan. Fujiwara no Michinaga is appointed regent.
- Japanese poet Koshikibu no Naishi (lady-in-waiting to Dowager Empress Shōshi) and her husband Fujiwara no Kiminari (son of Michinaga) have a son, but the couple is not accepted because of the social gap between them.

=== Europe ===
- Summer – Melus of Bari, a Lombard nobleman, revolts and is supported by Norman mercenaries at Capua. He marches into Apulia to catch the Byzantine army off-guard. Melus defeats the Byzantines on the banks of the Fortore River and ravages the territory in Apulia.
- Winter – Emperor Basil II ("the Bulgar Slayer") replaces Leo Tornikios with the new catapan Basil Boioannes and sends him reinforcements (including a detachment of the elite Varangian Guard) from Constantinople.

=== England ===
- January 6 – Cnut ("the Great") is crowned king of England. In July he marries Emma of Normandy, the widow of Æthelred the Unready, securing his ties with Normandy.
- Cnut divides England into four earldoms: Wessex, Mercia, East Anglia and Northumbria.

=== Arabian Empire ===
- Summer – Hamza ibn-'Ali ibn-Ahmad publicly declares the founding of the Druze religion, during the reign of the Fatimid Caliph Al-Hakim bi-Amr Allah.

=== Africa ===
- The Sunnis of Kairouan (modern Tunisia) revolt against the Shi'ite Zirid dynasty. The city is quickly retaken and sacked.

=== Asia ===
- March – Fujiwara no Michinaga passes the title of regent of Japan (Sesshō) to his eldest son Fujiwara no Yorimichi.
- September
  - Prince Atsuakira of Japan, eldest son of ex-Emperor Sanjō, having been struck by a skin disease and under intense pressure from Michinaga, resigns the title of Crown Prince in favour of his younger brother, Prince Atsunaga who marries Fujiwara no Kanshi, daughter of Michinaga.
  - Michinaga makes a pilgrimage to the Iwashimizu Shrine in Japan accompanied by many courtiers. The travelers divide themselves amongst 15 boats for a floating trip down the Yotogawa River. One of the vessels overturns and more than 30 people lose their lives.
- December 24 – Michinaga is granted the honorary title Daijō-daijin of Japan.
- Rajendra I, ruler of the Chola dynasty (in modern India), conquers Sri Lanka and annexes the island.

=== By topic ===
==== Religion ====
- Construction of Saint Sophia Cathedral, Kyiv is started (approximate date).

=== By place ===
==== Europe ====
- January 30 – The Peace of Bautzen: Emperor Henry II signs a peace treaty with Bolesław I the Brave, Duke of Poland, ending the German–Polish War. Poland keeps Lusatia – the Holy Roman Empire keeps Bohemia. With this peace agreement, Bolesław redirects his forces on an offensive against the Kievan Rus'.
- July 22–23 – Battle of the River Bug: Polish forces under Bolesław I defeat Yaroslav the Wise near the River Bug. Yaroslav retreats to Novgorod, abandoning Kiev.
- July 29 – Battle of Vlaardingen: Henry II sends an army towards Holland to subdue the rebellious Count Dirk III. The Imperial forces are defeated near Vlaardingen.
- August 14 – Bolesław I accepts the surrender of Kiev by the Pechenegs. He reinstates Sviatopolk I as Grand Prince of Kiev.
- August 15 – Ivats, Bulgarian nobleman and rebel leader, is treacherously blinded and captured by strategos Eustathios Daphnomeles, ending the last resistance to the Byzantine conquest of Bulgaria by Basil II.
- October 1 – Battle of Carham: King Malcolm II of Scotland and Owain Foel ("the Bald") of Strathclyde are victorious over either Uhtred the Bold or Eadwulf Cudel, rulers of Bamburgh. The battle confirms Scottish dominance over Lothian.
- October – Battle of Cannae: The Lombard adventurer Melus of Bari and his Norman mercenaries are decisively defeated by the Byzantine army, led by the Catepan Basil Boioannes.
- Cnut ("the Great"), King of England, travels to Denmark to succeed his brother Harald II on the Danish throne.

==== Africa ====
- Egyptian military commander Sa'id ibn Isa ibn Nasturus appointed Vizier of Egypt.

==== Asia ====
- January 22 – Emperor Go-Ichijō of Japan celebrates his coming-of-age ceremony; he is aged 9 at this time.
- November 26 – 19-year-old Fujiwara no Ishi marries her nephew Go-Ichijō, becoming Empress of Japan (Chugu), the third in succession of the daughters of influential court official Fujiwara no Michinaga to become Empress. Michinaga, who sent her to court in March, holds a banquet in celebration.
- December – Goryeo–Khitan War: Khitan forces of the Liao dynasty invade Goryeo (North Korea). Goryeo forces led by General Kang Kam-ch'an annihilates the Khitan army at Kusong.

=== By topic ===
==== Religion ====
- Buckfast Abbey (located near Buckfastleigh) is founded as a Benedictine monastery in England.

=== By place ===
==== Europe ====
- Sviatopolk I dies, and is succeeded by his brother Yaroslav I (the Wise). He becomes the Grand Prince of Kiev with the support of the Novgorodians and the help of Varangian (Viking) mercenaries. Yaroslav consolidates the Kievan state, through both cultural and administrative improvements, and military campaigns.

==== Africa ====
- The Azdâji conquest puts an end to the Kingdom of Nekor, in Morocco.

==== Asia ====
- March 10 – Battle of Gwiju: Korean forces, led by General Kang Kam-ch'an, gain a decisive victory over the Khitan Liao Dynasty at modern-day Kusong, ending the Third Goryeo-Khitan War.
- Toi invasion: Jurchen pirates, from the Khitan Liao Dynasty in modern-day Manchuria, sail with about 50 ships to invade Kyūshū in Japan. They assault the islands Tsushima and Iki. In April the pirates raid Matsuura but are defeated by the Japanese army.
- Japanese statesman and regent Fujiwara no Michinaga retires from public life, installing his son Yorimichi as regent. Michinaga, however, continues to direct affairs of state from his retirement, and remains the de facto ruler of Japan, until his death in 1028.

== Significant people ==
- Abu al-Qasim al-Zahrawi (Abulcasis)
- Abu Nasr Mansur
- Abu Rayhan al-Biruni
- Alhacen (Ibn al-Haytham)
- Avicenna (Ibn Sina)
- Basil II
- Boleslaus I
- Canute
- Fujiwara no Michinaga
- Henry II, Holy Roman Emperor
- Malcolm II of Scotland
- Al-Qadir caliph of Baghdad
- Sweyn I

== Births ==
1010

- May 30 – Zhao Zhen, Emperor Renzong of the Song dynasty (d. 1063)
- Adalbero, bishop of Würzburg (approximate date)
- Adalbero III of Luxembourg, German nobleman (d. 1072)
- Akkadevi, princess of the Chalukya dynasty (d. 1064)
- Anno II, archbishop of Cologne (approximate date)
- Arialdo, Italian nobleman and deacon (approximate date)
- Benno, bishop of Meissen (approximate date)
- Eberhard, archbishop of Trier (approximate date)
- Eleanor of Normandy, countess of Flanders (d. 1077)
- Gebhard, archbishop of Salzburg (approximate date)
- Gomes Echigues, Portuguese knight and governor (d. 1065)
- Honorius II, antipope of the Catholic Church (approximate date)
- John V of Gaeta, Italian nobleman (approximate date)
- Michael IV the Paphlagonian, Byzantine emperor (d. 1041)
- Odo (or Eudes), Gascon nobleman (approximate date)
- Otloh of Sankt Emmeram, German monk (approximate date)
- Siegfried I, German nobleman (approximate date)
- Tunka Manin, ruler of the Ghana Empire (d. 1078)

1011

- Jōjin, Japanese Tendai monk (d. 1081)
- Ralph the Staller, English nobleman (d. 1068)
- Robert I (the Old), duke of Burgundy (d. 1076)
- Shao Yong, Chinese philosopher and cosmologist (d. 1077)
- Yaghi Siyan, Seljuk governor of Antioch (d. 1098)

1012

- August 19 – Baldwin V, count of Flanders (d. 1067)
- Benedict IX, pope of the Catholic Church (approximate date)
- Cai Xiang, Chinese calligrapher, official and poet (d. 1067)
- Durandus of Troarn, French theologian (approximate date)
- García Sánchez III, king of Pamplona (approximate date)
- Guo, Chinese empress of the Song dynasty (d. 1035)
- Maria Dobroniega of Kiev, duchess of Poland (d. 1087)
- Marpa Lotsawa, Tibetan Buddhist teacher (d. 1097)
- Rongzom Mahapandita, Tibetan Buddhist scholar (d. 1088)
- Theobald III of Blois, French nobleman (d. 1089)

1013

- July 18 – Hermann of Reichenau, German music theorist (d. 1054)
- August 15 – Teishi (Yōmeimon-in), Japanese empress consort (d. 1094)
- September 22 – Richeza (or Adelaide), queen of Hungary (d. 1075)
- Abu al-Walid al-Baji, Moorish scholar and poet (d. 1081)
- Guaimar IV of Salerno, Italian nobleman (approximate date)
- Isaac Alfasi, Algerian Talmudist and posek (d. 1103)

1014

- May 11 – Anawrahta, founder of the Pagan Empire (Burma) (d. 1077)
- Al-Bakri, Andalusian historian and geographer (d. 1094)
- Cynan ab Iago, king of Gwynedd (approximate date)
- Iestyn ap Gwrgant, king of Morgannwg (d. 1093)

1015

- Andrew I ("the Catholic"), king of Hungary (d. 1060)
- Altmann, bishop of Passau (approximate date)
- Ermesinda of Bigorre, queen of Aragon (d. 1049)
- Eustace II, count of Boulogne (approximate date)
- Ferdinand I, king of León and Castile (d. 1065)
- Frozza Orseolo, margravine of Austria (d. 1071)
- Harald Hardrada, king of Norway (d. 1066)
- Herman IV, duke of Swabia (approximate date)
- John Komnenos, Byzantine aristocrat (d. 1067)
- Michael V Kalaphates, Byzantine emperor (d. 1042)
- Otto II, margrave of Montferrat (approximate date)
- Robert Guiscard, Norman nobleman (d. 1085)
- Roger de Beaumont, Norman nobleman (d. 1094)

1016

- April 3 – Xing Zong, emperor of the Liao dynasty. (d. 1055)
- June 9 – Deokjong, ruler of Goryeo (Korea). (d. 1034)
- July 25 – Casimir I the Restorer, duke of Poland. (d. 1058)
- August 24 – Fujiwara no Genshi, Japanese empress. (d. 1039)
- October 28 – Henry III, Holy Roman Emperor. (d. 1056)
- Cao, empress and regent of Song dynasty China. (d. 1079)
- Edward the Exile, son of Edmund II of England. (d. 1057)
- Không Lộ, Vietnamese Zen master (approximate date).
- Minamoto no Tsunenobu, Japanese nobleman. (d. 1097)
- Svein Knutsson, king of Norway. (d. 1035)
- Yan Vyshatich, Kievan nobleman. (d. 1106)

1017

- October 28 – Henry III, Holy Roman Emperor (d. 1056)
- Ahimaaz ben Paltiel, Italian-Jewish liturgical poet (d. 1060)
- Bermudo III (or Vermudo), king of León (approximate date)
- Floris I, count of Friesland west of the Vlie (approximate date)
- Ramanuja, Indian Sri Vaishnavism philosopher (d. 1137)
- Vikramabahu (Kassapa VI), king of Sri Lanka (d. 1041)
- Zhou Dunyi, Chinese philosopher and cosmologist (d. 1073)

1018

- April 10 – Nizam al-Mulk, Persian scholar and vizier (d. 1092)
- August 31 – Jeongjong II, ruler of Goryeo (Korea) (d. 1046)
- Abul Hasan Hankari, Abbasid scholar and jurist (d. 1093)
- Bagrat IV, Georgian king of the Bagrationi dynasty (d. 1072)
- Ermengarde of Anjou, duchess of Burgundy (d. 1076)
- Harthacnut (or Cnut III), king of Denmark (d. 1042)
- Michael Psellos, Byzantine monk and philosopher (approximate date)
- Richilde, countess and regent of Flanders (d. 1086)
- Victor II, pope of the Roman Catholic Church (d. 1057)

1019

- November 17 – Sima Guang, Chinese politician and writer (d. 1086)
- December 29 – Munjong, ruler of Goryeo (Korea) (d. 1083)
- Abe no Sadato, Japanese nobleman and samurai (d. 1062)
- Dominic de la Calzada, Spanish priest and saint (d. 1109)
- Gundekar II (or Gunzo), bishop of Eichstätt (d. 1075)
- Mauger (or Malger), archbishop of Rouen (d. 1055)
- Śrīpati, Indian astronomer and mathematician (d. 1066)
- Sweyn II (Estridsson), king of Denmark (approximate date)
- Wang Gui, Chinese official and chancellor (d. 1085)
- Wen Tong, Chinese painter and calligrapher (d. 1079)
- Yūsuf Balasaguni, Karakhanid statesman (d. 1085)
- Zeng Gong, Chinese scholar and historian (d. 1083)

== Deaths ==
1010

- February 14 – Fujiwara no Korechika, Japanese nobleman (b. 974)
- Ælfric of Eynsham, English abbot and scholar (approximate date)
- Abu'l-Nasr Muhammad, Farighunid ruler (approximate date)
- Aimoin, French monk and chronicler (approximate date)
- Aisha, Andalusian poet and writer (approximate date)
- Cathal mac Conchobar mac Taidg, king of Connacht
- Ermengol I (or Armengol), count of Urgell (b. 974)
- John Kourkouas, Byzantine catepan (approximate date)
- Maelsuthan Ua Cerbhail, Irish advisor and chronicler
- Vijayanandi, Indian mathematician (approximate date)

1011

- February 9 – Bernard I, German nobleman
- February 23 – Willigis, archbishop of Mainz
- July 25 – Ichijō, emperor of Japan (b. 980)
- November 5 – Mathilde, German abbess (b. 949)
- November 21 – Reizei, emperor of Japan (b. 950)
- Abu Ali Hasan Ibn Ustadh-Hurmuz, Buyid general
- Albert I, count of Namur (approximate date)
- Anna Porphyrogenita, Grand Princess of Kiev
- Boniface, Italian nobleman (approximate date)
- Conrad I, duke of Carinthia (approximate date)
- Mahendradatta, queen of Bali (b. 961)
- Muhammad ibn Suri, Ghurid ruler (malik)
- Sumbat III, Georgian prince of Tao-Klarjeti
- Uma no Naishi, Japanese waka poet (b. 949)

1012

- April 1 – Herman III, duke of Swabia
- April 19 – Ælfheah, archbishop of Canterbury
- May 12 – Sergius IV, pope of the Catholic Church (b. 970)
- May 26 – Erluin II, monk and abbot of Gembloux
- June 9
  - Tagino, archbishop of Magdeburg
  - Unger, bishop of Poznań
- August 12 – Walthard, archbishop of Magdeburg
- September 12 – Ad-Da'i Yusuf, Zaidi imam and ruler
- October 18 – Coloman of Stockerau, Irish pilgrim
- December 22 – Baha' al-Dawla, Buyid emir of Iraq
- Erluin, archdeacon and bishop of Cambrai
- Gaston II Centule, viscount of Béarn
- Gundemaro Pinióliz, Spanish nobleman
- Guy of Anderlecht (or Guido), Christian saint
- Ibn Faradi, Moorish scholar and historian (b. 962)
- John II Crescentius, consul and patrician of Rome
- John Morosini (the Blessed), Venetian abbot
- Otto, duke of Lower Lorraine (approximate date)
- Qabus, Ziyarid emir of Gorgan and Tabaristan
- Roger I, count of Carcassonne (approximate date)
- Tedald of Canossa, Italian nobleman

1013

- April 19 – Hisham II, caliph of Córdoba (Spain) (b. 966)
- June 5 – Al-Baqillani, Arab theologian, jurist and logician
- c. August – Mufarrij ibn Daghfal ibn al-Jarrah, Jarrahid emir (b. c. 977)
- Al-Mahdi al-Husayn, Zaidi imam of Yemen (b. 987)
- Abu al-Qasim al-Zahrawi, Arab physician, "father of surgery", author of Al-Tasrif (b. 936)
- Giselbert I, count of Roussillon (Spain) (or 1004)
- Reginar IV, French nobleman (approximate date)

1014

- February 3 – Sweyn Forkbeard, king of Denmark and England (b. 960)
- February 9 – Yang Yanzhao, general of the Song dynasty
- April 23 – Battle of Clontarf:
  - Brian Boru, High King of Ireland
  - Carnen Ua Cadhla, Irish nobleman
  - Mathghamhain, Irish nobleman
  - Murchad mac Briain, Irish nobleman
  - Sigurd the Stout, Viking nobleman (earl)
  - Tadhg Mór Ua Cellaigh, king of Uí Maine
- May 7 – Bagrat III, king of Abkhazia (Georgia)
- June 25 – Æthelstan Ætheling, son of Æthelred the Unready
- August – Pandulf II ("the Old"), prince of Benevento and Capua
- October 6 – Samuel, emperor (tsar) of the Bulgarian Empire
- November 11 – Werner, margrave of the North March
- November 26 – Swanehilde, German noblewoman
- Abu'l-Abbas ibn al-Furat, Fatimid vizier (or 1015)
- Al-Hakim Nishapuri, Persian Sunni scholar (b. 933)
- Raja Raja Chola I, king of the Chola dynasty. (India)
- Brithwine I, bishop of Sherborne (approximate date)
- Giselbert I, count of Roussillon (Spain) (or 1013)
- Lu Zhen, Chinese scholar-official and diplomat
- Rotbold II, margrave of Provence (approximate date)
- Theophylact Botaneiates, Byzantine general and governor
- Wulfnoth Cild, English nobleman (approximate date)

1015

- February 5 – Adelaide, German abbess and saint
- February 13 – Gilbert of Meaux, French bishop
- July 15 – Vladimir the Great, Grand Prince of Kiev
- September 1 – Gero II, margrave of the Saxon Ostmark
- September 12 – Lambert I, count of Louvain (b. 950)
- December 14 – Arduin of Ivrea, king of Italy (b. 955)
- December 20 – Eido I, bishop of Meissen (b. 955)
- date unknown
  - Æthelmær the Stout, English ealdorman
  - Al-Sharif al-Radi, Persian Shi'ite scholar (b. 970)
  - Gavril Radomir, emperor (tsar) of Bulgaria
  - Geoffrey (or Godfrey), count of Eu (b. 962)
  - Herbert III, count of Vermandois (b. 953)
  - Hugh III, count of Maine (approximate date)
  - Ibn Furak, Muslim imam and theologian (b. 941)
  - Irene of Larissa, empress (tsarina) of Bulgaria
  - Liu Zong, Chinese official of the Song dynasty
  - Masawaih al-Mardini, Syrian physician and writer
  - Morcar (or Morkere), English minister (thegn)
  - Owain ap Dyfnwal, king of Strathclyde (Scotland)
  - Rodulf of Ivry, Norman nobleman (approximate date)
  - Sigeferth (or Sigefrith), English chief minister
  - Vikramaditya V, Indian ruler of the Chalukya Empire

1016

- April 23 – Æthelred the Unready, king of England.
- May 22 – Jovan Vladimir, Serbian prince. (b. 990)
- September 6 – Fujiwara no Bokushi, great-grandmother of the Emperor of Japan
- October 18.
  - Ælfric of Hampshire, English nobleman.
  - Eadnoth the Younger, bishop of Dorchester in England.
  - Ulfcytel Snillingr, English nobleman.
- November 30 – Edmund II "Ironside", king of England.
- Badis ibn Mansur, Muslim emir of the Zirid dynasty.
- Henry II "the Good", count of Stade. (b. 946)
- Liu Chenggui, official of Song dynasty China. (b. 951)
- Simeon of Mantua, Armenian Benedictine monk.
- Sulayman ibn al-Hakam, caliph of Córdoba.
- Uhtred the Bold, English nobleman.
- Wulfgar of Abingdon, English abbot.
- Dharmawangsa, king of Mataram.

1017

- February 5 – Sancho García, count of Castile
- June 5 – Sanjō, ex-emperor of Japan (b. 976)
- June 22 – Leo Passianos, Byzantine general
- July 6 – Genshin, Japanese Tendai scholar (b. 942)
- September 18 – Henry of Schweinfurt, German nobleman
- October 6 – Wang Dan, Chinese Grand Chancellor
- Eadric Streona, ealdorman of Mercia
- Eadwig Ætheling, son of Æthelred II
- Elvira of Castile, queen consort of León
- Emnilda, duchess consort of Poland
- Fujiwara no Junshi, Japanese empress (b. 957)
- Judith of Brittany, duchess of Normandy (b. 982)
- Ma'mun II, Ma'munid ruler of Khwarezm
- Ramon Borrell, count of Barcelona (b. 972)
- Renaud of Vendôme, French nobleman

1018

- February 24 – Borrell, bishop of Vic (Spain)
- February 25 – Arnulf II, archbishop of Milan
- March 22 – Ali ibn Hammud al-Nasir, caliph of Córdoba
- June 23 – Henry I ("the Strong"), margrave of Austria
- July 7 – Gerberga of Burgundy, duchess of Swabia
- September 25 – Berthold of Toul, German bishop
- October 1
  - Gilbert Buatère, Norman nobleman
  - Osmond Drengot, Norman nobleman
- December 1 – Thietmar, bishop of Merseburg (b. 975)
- Abd al-Rahman IV, Umayyad caliph of Córdoba
- Aeddan ap Blegywryd, king of Gwynedd
- Adolf I of Lotharingia, German nobleman
- Aldhun, bishop of Lindisfarne (or 1019)
- Dragomir, ruler of Travunia and Zachlumia
- Harald II, king and regent of Denmark
- Ivan Vladislav, emperor (tsar) of Bulgaria
- Frederick, German nobleman (b. 974)

1019

- June 28 – Heimerad (or Heimo), German priest and saint
- October 6 – Frederick of Luxembourg, count of Moselgau (b. 965)
- Aldhun (or Ealdhun), bishop of Lindisfarne (or 1018)
- Sergius II (the Studite), patriarch of Constantinople
- Sviatopolk I, Grand Prince of Kiev (b. 980)

== Sources ==
- Agnihotri, V. K. (2010). "South India". Indian History with Objective Questions and Historical Maps (26 ed.). Allied Publishers. ISBN 978-8184243406.
- Benvenuti, Gino (1985). Le Repubbliche Marinare. Amalfi, Pisa, Genova e Venezia (in Italian). Rome: Newton & Compton Editori. p. 33. ISBN 978-8882895297.
- Boissonade, B. (1934). "Les premières croisades françaises en Espagne. Normands, Gascons, Aquitains et Bourguignons (1018–1032)". Bulletin Hispanique. 36 (1): 5–28. doi:10.3406/hispa.1934.2607.
- Bradbury, Jim (2004). The Routledge Companion to Medieval Warfare. ISBN 0-415-22126-9.
- Chandler, Tertius (1989). Four Thousand Years of Urban Growth. Edwin Mellen Press. ISBN 978-0889462076.
- Emery, Anthony (2006). Greater Medieval Houses of England and Wales, 1300–1500. Volume 3, Southern England. Cambridge University Press. ISBN 978-0-521-58132-5.
- Kleinhenz, Christopher, ed. (2010). Medieval Italy: an encyclopedia. Vol. 1. Routledge. ISBN 978-0415939294.
- Lamb, H. H. (2012) [1977]. Climate: Present, Past and Future: Climatic History and the Future. Vol. 2. London: Methuen and Co. / Routledge. ISBN 978-0415682237.
- Meynier, Gilbert (2010). L'Algérie cœur du Maghreb classique. De l'ouverture islamo-arabe au repli (658-1518) (in French). Paris: La Découverte. ISBN 978-2707152312.
- Needham, Mark (2008). "Æthelred (II The Unready, King of the English 978-1013, 1014-1016)". Archived from the original on 2014-11-19.
- Ngô Sĩ Liên (1993). Đại Việt sử ký toàn thư, Basic Annals (PDF) (in Vietnamese). Vol. II, Kỷ nhà Lý: Thái Tổ Hoàng Đế (Nội các quan bản ed.). Hanoi: Social Science Publishing House.
- Norwich, John Julius (1967). The Normans in the South 1016–1130. Longmans. ISBN 978-0582107519.
- Palmer, Alan; Palmer, Veronica (1992). Chronology of British History. London: Century Ltd / Barrie & Jenkins. ISBN 978-0712656160.
- Rosenberg, Matt T. (2001). "Largest Cities Through History". About.com. Archived from the original on 2001-02-18.
- Toumanoff, C. (1967). Studies in Christian Caucasian History. Washington D. C.: Georgetown University Press. OCLC 901879629.
- Williams, Hywel (2005). Cassell's Chronology of World History. Weidenfeld & Nicolson. ISBN 978-0304357307.
