= 1018 in Scotland =

- Centuries: 11th; 12th; 13th
- Decades: 1010s
- See also: List of years in Scotland; Timeline of Scottish history 1018 in: England • Elsewhere

Events from the year 1018 in the Kingdom of Scotland.

== Incumbents ==
- Monarch — Malcolm II

== Events ==
- Battle of Carham results in a victory for the Kingdom of Scotland and establishes the River Tweed as the southern border of the kingdom
