= 1014 =

Calendar year

1014 in various calendars
Gregorian calendar	1014; MXIV
Ab urbe condita	1767
Armenian calendar	463; ԹՎ ՆԿԳ
Assyrian calendar	5764
Balinese saka calendar	935–936
Bengali calendar	420–421
Berber calendar	1964
English Regnal year	N/A
Buddhist calendar	1558
Burmese calendar	376
Byzantine calendar	6522–6523
Chinese calendar	癸丑年 (Water Ox); 3711 or 3504 — to — 甲寅年 (Wood Tiger); 3712 or 3505
Coptic calendar	730–731
Discordian calendar	2180
Ethiopian calendar	1006–1007
Hebrew calendar	4774–4775
- Hindu calendars
Vikram Samvat	1070–1071
Shaka Samvat	935–936
Kali Yuga	4114–4115
Holocene calendar	11014
Igbo calendar	14–15
Iranian calendar	392–393
Islamic calendar	404–405
Japanese calendar	Chōwa 3 (長和３年)
Javanese calendar	916–917
Julian calendar	1014; MXIV
Korean calendar	3347
Minguo calendar	898 before ROC 民前898年
Nanakshahi calendar	−454
Seleucid era	1325/1326 AG
Thai solar calendar	1556–1557
Tibetan calendar	ཆུ་མོ་གླང་ལོ་ (female Water-Ox); 1140 or 759 or −13 — to — ཤིང་ཕོ་སྟག་ལོ་ (male Wood-Tiger); 1141 or 760 or −12

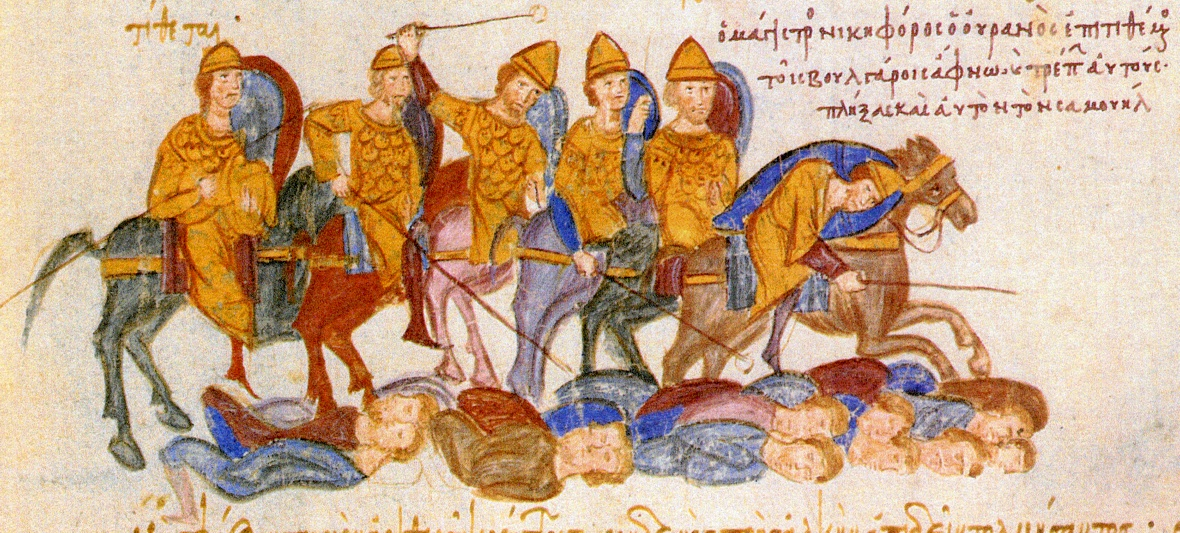
Basil II defeats the Bulgarians at Kleidon.

Year 1014 (MXIV) was a common year starting on Friday of the Julian calendar, the 1014th in topic the 1014th year of the Common Era (CE) and Anno Domini (AD) designations, the 14th year of the 2nd millennium, the 14th year of the 11th century, and the 5th year of the 1010s decade.

== Events ==
=== By place ===
==== Byzantine Empire ====
- Summer – Battle of Thessalonica: Emperor Basil II launches a raiding expedition against Bulgaria. From Western Thrace via Serres he reaches the valley of the Strymon River, near Thessaloniki (modern Greece); the local Byzantine governor Theophylact Botaneiates defeats the Bulgarians.
- July 29 – Battle of Kleidion: Basil II defeats the Bulgarian forces, between the mountains of Belasitsa and Ograzhden, near the town of Kleidon. By order of Basil, almost 15,000 prisoners are blinded; Tsar Samuel survives the battle, but dies of shock. Basil earns the nickname "Bulgar-Slayer".

==== Europe ====
- February 14 – King Henry II arrives at Rome and is crowned Holy Roman Emperor together with his wife Cunigunde by Pope Benedict VIII in St. Peter's Basilica. Henry establishes the Diocese of Bobbio (Northern Italy) and returns to Germany.

==== England ====
- February 3 – King Sweyn Forkbeard dies at Gainsborough after a reign of five weeks. He is succeeded by Harald II who becomes king of Denmark, while Cnut is elected by the Vikings of the Danelaw as king of England.
- March – King Æthelred the Unready sends ambassadors to England, including his own son Edward to negotiate to reclaim of the throne at the invitation of the English nobles.

==== Ireland ====
- April 23 – Battle of Clontarf: Brian Boru, High King of Ireland, defeats a Norse-Irish alliance, although himself killed.

==== Africa ====
- Hammad ibn Buluggin adopts Sunni Islam and declares his independence from the Zirid dynasty (modern Algeria). He recognizes the Abbasid Caliphate in Baghdad as being the rightful caliphs and becomes the first ruler of the Hammadid dynasty (until 1028).

==== Asia ====
- Emperor Sanjō of Japan has an eye illness. Influential statesman Fujiwara no Michinaga schemes to place his 6-year-old grandson Prince Atsuhira on the throne rather than the Emperor's son.
- Rajendra Chola I, king of the Chola dynasty begins his reign. (India)

=== By topic ===
==== Religion ====
- The Nicene-Constantinopolitan Symbol of the Faith is used for the first time during the Roman Mass, after Henry II, the newly crowned Holy Roman Emperor, asks the Pope to add it – together with the filioque clause. Prior to this date, the Creed has not been used at all during the liturgy.
- Wulfstan, archbishop of York in England, preaches his Latin homily Sermo Lupi ad Anglos ("Wulf's Address to the English"), describing the Danes as "God's judgement on England".

== Births ==
- May 11 – Anawrahta, founder of the Pagan Empire (Burma) (d. 1077)
- Al-Bakri, Andalusian historian and geographer (d. 1094)
- Cynan ab Iago, king of Gwynedd (approximate date)
- Iestyn ap Gwrgant, king of Morgannwg (d. 1093)

== Deaths ==
- February 3 – Sweyn Forkbeard, king of Denmark and England (b. 960)
- February 9 – Yang Yanzhao, general of the Song dynasty
- April 23 – Battle of Clontarf:
  - Brian Boru, High King of Ireland
  - Carnen Ua Cadhla, Irish nobleman
  - Mathghamhain, Irish nobleman
  - Murchad mac Briain, Irish nobleman
  - Sigurd the Stout, Viking nobleman (earl)
  - Tadhg Mór Ua Cellaigh, king of Uí Maine
- May 7 – Bagrat III, king of Abkhazia (Georgia)
- June 25 – Æthelstan Ætheling, son of Æthelred the Unready
- August – Pandulf II ("the Old"), prince of Benevento and Capua
- October 6 – Samuel, emperor (tsar) of the Bulgarian Empire
- November 11 – Werner, margrave of the North March
- November 26 – Swanehilde, German noblewoman
- Abu'l-Abbas ibn al-Furat, Fatimid vizier (or 1015)
- Al-Hakim Nishapuri, Persian Sunni scholar (b. 933)
- Raja Raja Chola I, king of the Chola dynasty. (India)
- Brithwine I, bishop of Sherborne (approximate date)
- Giselbert I, count of Roussillon (Spain) (or 1013)
- Lu Zhen, Chinese scholar-official and diplomat
- Rotbold II, margrave of Provence (approximate date)
- Theophylact Botaneiates, Byzantine general and governor
- Wulfnoth Cild, English nobleman (approximate date)

== Sources ==
- Needham, Mark (2008). "Æthelred (II The Unready, King of the English 978-1013, 1014-1016)". Archived from the original on November 19, 2014.
- Palmer, Alan; Palmer, Veronica (1992). Chronology of British History. London: Century Ltd / Barrie & Jenkins. pp. 48–49. ISBN 978-0712656160.
- Williams, Hywel (2005). Cassell's Chronology of World History. Weidenfeld & Nicolson. pp. 105–106. ISBN 978-0304357307.
