= Wang Gui =

Wang Gui may refer to:

- Wang Gui (Tang chancellor) (571–639), Tang dynasty chancellor who also served under the Sui dynasty
- Wang Gui (Song dynasty) (1019–1085), Song dynasty chancellor
