= Giác Hải =

Giác Hải (Vietnamese: 覺海, fl. 1100) was a Vietnamese Buddhist Thiền monk and the most famous disciple of fisherman turned Thiền master Không Lộ (1016-1094). He is mentioned in a poem by emperor Lý Nhân Tông (1066–1127). Chapter 11 of 15th Century writer Nam Ông's Nam Ông mộng lục entitled "Tăng đạo thần thông" (僧道神通) tells the story of how he joined forces with the Daoist master Thông Huyền to slay two demons.
