= 1019 =

Calendar year

1019 in various calendars
Gregorian calendar	1019; MXIX
Ab urbe condita	1772
Armenian calendar	468; ԹՎ ՆԿԸ
Assyrian calendar	5769
Balinese saka calendar	940–941
Bengali calendar	425–426
Berber calendar	1969
English Regnal year	N/A
Buddhist calendar	1563
Burmese calendar	381
Byzantine calendar	6527–6528
Chinese calendar	戊午年 (Earth Horse); 3716 or 3509 — to — 己未年 (Earth Goat); 3717 or 3510
Coptic calendar	735–736
Discordian calendar	2185
Ethiopian calendar	1011–1012
Hebrew calendar	4779–4780
- Hindu calendars
Vikram Samvat	1075–1076
Shaka Samvat	940–941
Kali Yuga	4119–4120
Holocene calendar	11019
Igbo calendar	19–20
Iranian calendar	397–398
Islamic calendar	409–410
Japanese calendar	Kannin 3 (寛仁３年)
Javanese calendar	921–922
Julian calendar	1019; MXIX
Korean calendar	3352
Minguo calendar	893 before ROC 民前893年
Nanakshahi calendar	−449
Seleucid era	1330/1331 AG
Thai solar calendar	1561–1562
Tibetan calendar	ས་ཕོ་རྟ་ལོ་ (male Earth-Horse); 1145 or 764 or −8 — to — ས་མོ་ལུག་ལོ་ (female Earth-Sheep); 1146 or 765 or −7

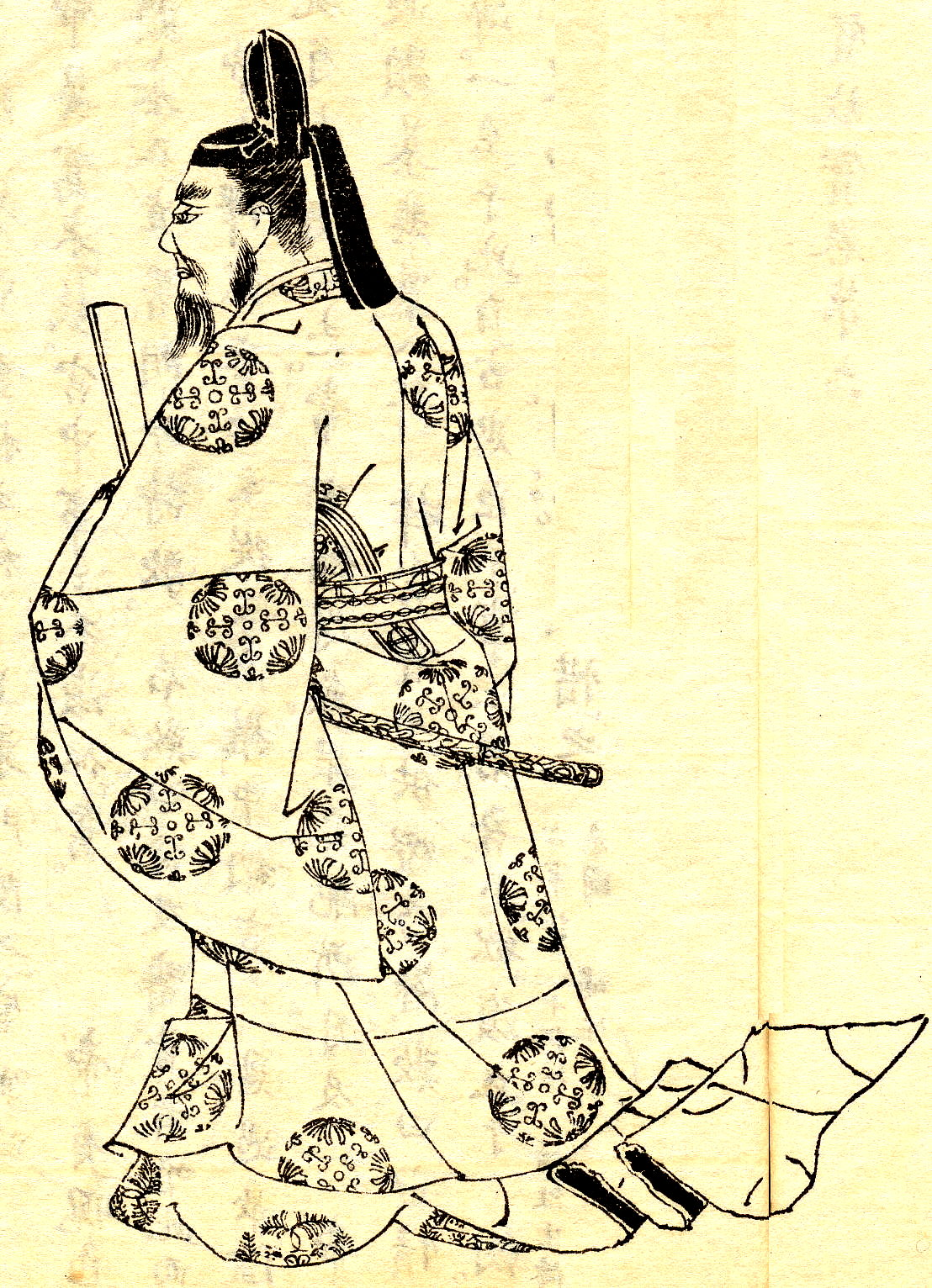
Fujiwara no Michinaga (966–1028)

Year 1019 (MXIX) was a common year starting on Thursday of the Julian calendar.

== Events ==
=== By place ===
==== Europe ====
- Sviatopolk I dies, and is succeeded by his brother Yaroslav I (the Wise). He becomes the Grand Prince of Kiev with the support of the Novgorodians and the help of Varangian (Viking) mercenaries. Yaroslav consolidates the Kievan state, through both cultural and administrative improvements, and military campaigns.

==== Africa ====
- The Azdâji conquest puts an end to the Kingdom of Nekor, in Morocco.

==== Asia ====
- March 10 – Battle of Gwiju: Korean forces, led by General Kang Kam-ch'an, gain a decisive victory over the Khitan Liao Dynasty at modern-day Kusong, ending the Third Goryeo-Khitan War.
- Toi invasion: Jurchen pirates, from the Khitan Liao Dynasty in modern-day Manchuria, sail with about 50 ships to invade Kyūshū in Japan. They assault the islands Tsushima and Iki. In April the pirates raid Matsuura but are defeated by the Japanese army.
- Japanese statesman and regent Fujiwara no Michinaga retires from public life, installing his son Yorimichi as regent. Michinaga, however, continues to direct affairs of state from his retirement, and remains the de facto ruler of Japan, until his death in 1028.

== Births ==
- November 17 – Sima Guang, Chinese politician and writer (d. 1086)
- December 29 – Munjong, ruler of Goryeo (Korea) (d. 1083)
- Abe no Sadato, Japanese nobleman and samurai (d. 1062)
- Dominic de la Calzada, Spanish priest and saint (d. 1109)
- Gundekar II (or Gunzo), bishop of Eichstätt (d. 1075)
- Mauger (or Malger), archbishop of Rouen (d. 1055)
- Śrīpati, Indian astronomer and mathematician (d. 1066)
- Sweyn II (Estridsson), king of Denmark (approximate date)
- Wang Gui, Chinese official and chancellor (d. 1085)
- Wen Tong, Chinese painter and calligrapher (d. 1079)
- Yūsuf Balasaguni, Karakhanid statesman (d. 1085)
- Zeng Gong, Chinese scholar and historian (d. 1083)

== Deaths ==
- June 28 – Heimerad (or Heimo), German priest and saint
- October 6 – Frederick of Luxembourg, count of Moselgau (b. 965)
- Aldhun (or Ealdhun), bishop of Lindisfarne (or 1018)
- Sergius II (the Studite), patriarch of Constantinople
- Sviatopolk I, Grand Prince of Kiev (b. 980)
