= 1015 =

Calendar year

1015 in various calendars
- Gregorian calendar: 1015; MXV
- Ab urbe condita: 1768
- Armenian calendar: 464; ԹՎ ՆԿԴ
- Assyrian calendar: 5765
- Balinese saka calendar: 936–937
- Bengali calendar: 421–422
- Berber calendar: 1965
- English Regnal year: N/A
- Buddhist calendar: 1559
- Burmese calendar: 377
- Byzantine calendar: 6523–6524
- Chinese calendar: 甲寅年 (Wood Tiger); 3712 or 3505 — to — 乙卯年 (Wood Rabbit); 3713 or 3506
- Coptic calendar: 731–732
- Discordian calendar: 2181
- Ethiopian calendar: 1007–1008
- Hebrew calendar: 4775–4776
- Hindu calendars
- Vikram Samvat: 1071–1072
- Shaka Samvat: 936–937
- Kali Yuga: 4115–4116
- Holocene calendar: 11015
- Igbo calendar: 15–16
- Iranian calendar: 393–394
- Islamic calendar: 405–406
- Japanese calendar: Chōwa 4 (長和４年)
- Javanese calendar: 917–918
- Julian calendar: 1015; MXV
- Korean calendar: 3348
- Minguo calendar: 897 before ROC 民前897年
- Nanakshahi calendar: −453
- Seleucid era: 1326/1327 AG
- Thai solar calendar: 1557–1558
- Tibetan calendar: ཤིང་ཕོ་སྟག་ལོ་ (male Wood-Tiger); 1141 or 760 or −12 — to — ཤིང་མོ་ཡོས་ལོ་ (female Wood-Hare); 1142 or 761 or −11

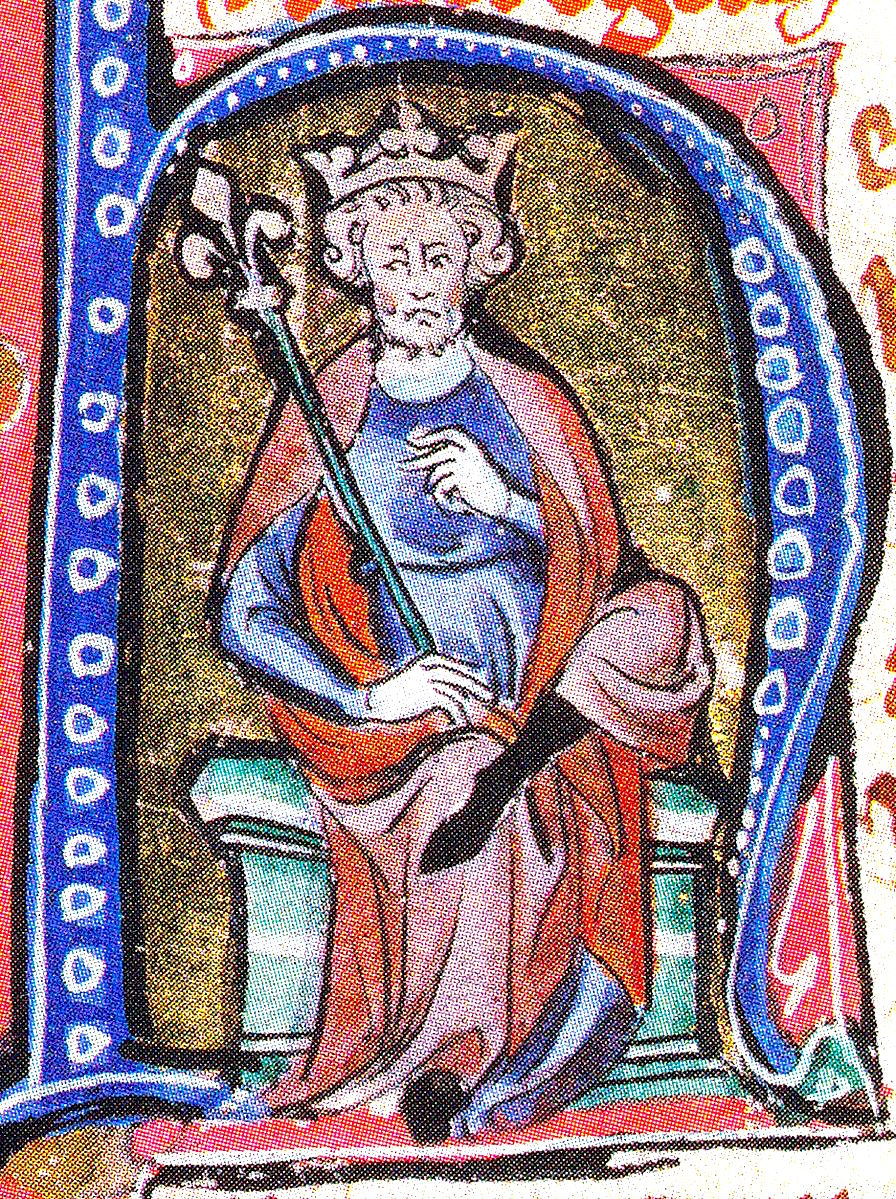
Portrait of Cnut the Great (c. 995–1035)

Year 1015 (MXV) was a common year starting on Saturday of the Julian calendar.

== Events ==
=== By place ===
==== Asia ====
- October – Influential Japanese statesman Fujiwara no Michinaga is appointed to be Associate Regent.
- November – The newly constructed Japanese imperial residence burns down.
- Peacocks arrive from the Chinese Song Empire to Fujiwara's mansion in Japan.

==== Europe ====
- July 15 – Vladimir the Great dies at Berestove after a 35-year reign. He is succeeded by his son Sviatopolk I as Grand Prince of Kiev.
- Summer – King Cnut the Great of Denmark launches an invasion of Mercia and Northumbria in England.
- Emperor Henry II launches a German expedition against Duke Bolesław I the Brave. He invades Poland, but is stopped by Bolesław's forces at Krosno, on the Oder River.
- Earl Eric Haakonsson outlaws berserkers in Norway.
- Olaf Haraldsson declares himself King of Norway.

== Births ==
- Andrew I ("the Catholic"), king of Hungary (d. 1060)
- Altmann, bishop of Passau (approximate date)
- Ermesinda of Bigorre, queen of Aragon (d. 1049)
- Eustace II, count of Boulogne (approximate date)
- Ferdinand I, king of León and Castile (d. 1065)
- Frozza Orseolo, margravine of Austria (d. 1071)
- Harald Hardrada, king of Norway (d. 1066)
- Herman IV, duke of Swabia (approximate date)
- John Komnenos, Byzantine aristocrat (d. 1067)
- Michael V Kalaphates, Byzantine emperor (d. 1042)
- Otto II, margrave of Montferrat (approximate date)
- Robert Guiscard, Norman nobleman (d. 1085)
- Roger de Beaumont, Norman nobleman (d. 1094)

== Deaths ==
- February 5 – Adelaide, German abbess and saint
- February 13 – Gilbert of Meaux, French bishop
- July 15 – Vladimir the Great, Grand Prince of Kiev
- September 1 – Gero II, margrave of the Saxon Ostmark
- September 12 – Lambert I, count of Louvain (b. 950)
- December 14 – Arduin of Ivrea, king of Italy (b. 955)
- December 20 – Eido I, bishop of Meissen (b. 955)
- date unknown
  - Æthelmær the Stout, English ealdorman
  - Al-Sharif al-Radi, Persian Shi'ite scholar (b. 970)
  - Gavril Radomir, emperor (tsar) of Bulgaria
  - Geoffrey (or Godfrey), count of Eu (b. 962)
  - Herbert III, count of Vermandois (b. 953)
  - Hugh III, count of Maine (approximate date)
  - Ibn Furak, Muslim imam and theologian (b. 941)
  - Irene of Larissa, empress (tsarina) of Bulgaria
  - Liu Zong, Chinese official of the Song dynasty
  - Masawaih al-Mardini, Syrian physician and writer
  - Morcar (or Morkere), English minister (thegn)
  - Owain ap Dyfnwal, king of Strathclyde (Scotland)
  - Rodulf of Ivry, Norman nobleman (approximate date)
  - Sigeferth (or Sigefrith), English chief minister
  - Vikramaditya V, Indian ruler of the Chalukya Empire

== Sources ==
- Williams, Hywel (2005). Cassell's Chronology of World History. Weidenfeld & Nicolson. pp. 105–106. ISBN 978-0304357307.
