= 1016 =

Calendar year

1016 in various calendars
- Gregorian calendar: 1016; MXVI
- Ab urbe condita: 1769
- Armenian calendar: 465; ԹՎ ՆԿԵ
- Assyrian calendar: 5766
- Balinese saka calendar: 937–938
- Bengali calendar: 422–423
- Berber calendar: 1966
- English Regnal year: N/A
- Buddhist calendar: 1560
- Burmese calendar: 378
- Byzantine calendar: 6524–6525
- Chinese calendar: 乙卯年 (Wood Rabbit); 3713 or 3506 — to — 丙辰年 (Fire Dragon); 3714 or 3507
- Coptic calendar: 732–733
- Discordian calendar: 2182
- Ethiopian calendar: 1008–1009
- Hebrew calendar: 4776–4777
- Hindu calendars
- Vikram Samvat: 1072–1073
- Shaka Samvat: 937–938
- Kali Yuga: 4116–4117
- Holocene calendar: 11016
- Igbo calendar: 16–17
- Iranian calendar: 394–395
- Islamic calendar: 406–407
- Japanese calendar: Chōwa 5 (長和５年)
- Javanese calendar: 918–919
- Julian calendar: 1016; MXVI
- Korean calendar: 3349
- Minguo calendar: 896 before ROC 民前896年
- Nanakshahi calendar: −452
- Seleucid era: 1327/1328 AG
- Thai solar calendar: 1558–1559
- Tibetan calendar: ཤིང་མོ་ཡོས་ལོ་ (female Wood-Hare); 1142 or 761 or −11 — to — མེ་ཕོ་འབྲུག་ལོ་ (male Fire-Dragon); 1143 or 762 or −10

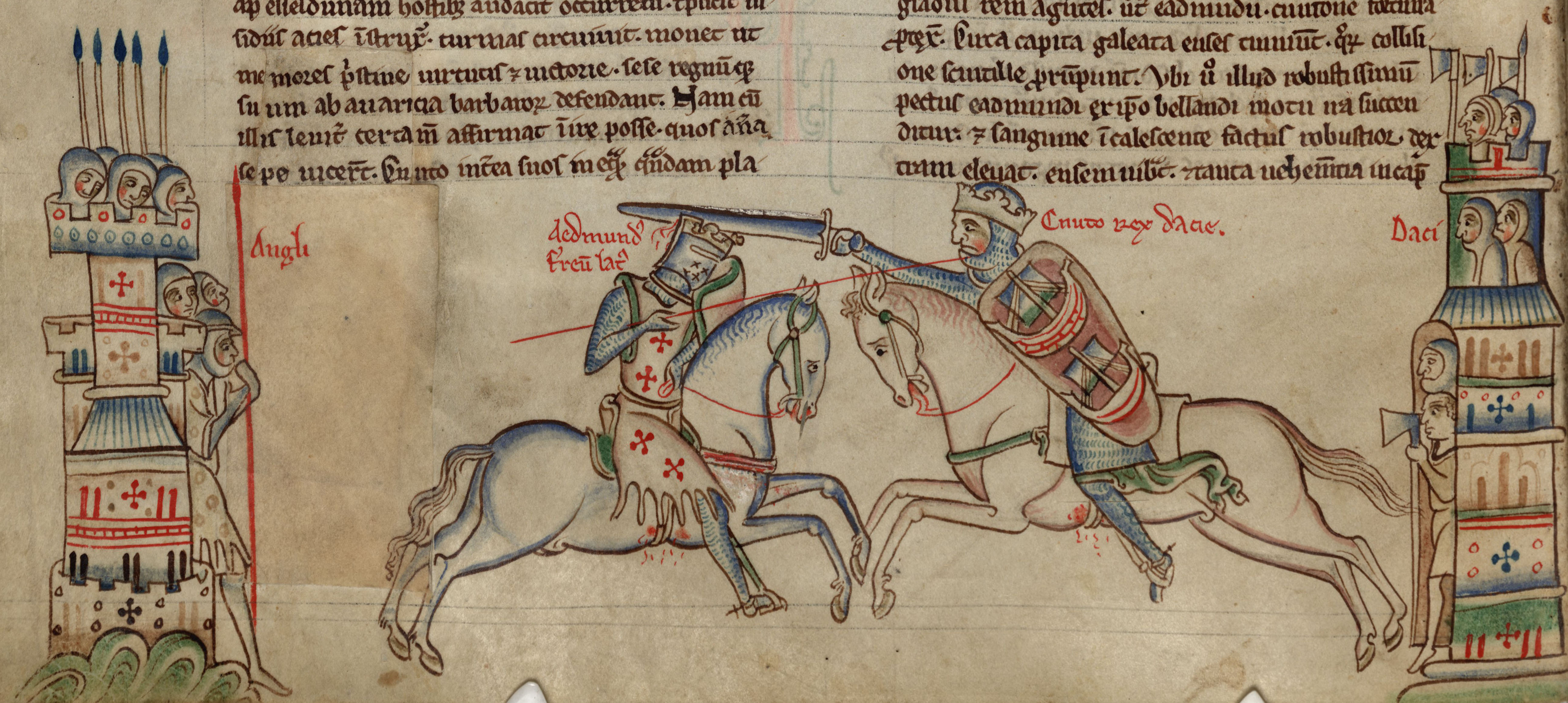
Battle of Assandun: King Edmund II (left) is defeated by forces of Cnut the Great.

Year 1016 (MXVI) was a leap year starting on Sunday of the Julian calendar.

== Events ==
=== By place ===
==== Europe ====
- March 25 – Battle of Nesjar (off the coast of Norway): Olaf Haraldsson is victorious over former co-regent Sweyn Haakonsson, confirming his status as king of Norway.
- April 23 – Æthelred the Unready, king of England, dies after a 38-year reign. He is succeeded by his son Edmund II "Ironside".
- Summer – Battle of Brentford (near London): Edmund Ironside defeats the Danes under King Cnut.
- July 6 – Battle of Pontlevoy: French forces of Fulk III and Herbert I defeat Odo II which determines the balance of power in the Loire Valley.
- October 18 – Battle of Assandun: Cnut defeats Edmund Ironside, leaving the latter as king of Wessex.
- November 30 – Edmund II dies and Cnut takes control of the whole of the Kingdom of England.
- The Pisan and the Genoese republics launch a naval offensive against the Muslim strongholds of Sardinia, in particular Porto Torres, and defeat the fleet of the taifa king of Dénia, Mujāhid al-ʿĀmirī.
- Melus of Bari makes a second attempt against Byzantine-held Southern Italy. To support his cause, he hires Norman mercenaries, unwittingly triggering the rise of Norman rule over southern Italy.
- Georgius Tzul, ruler of Khazaria, is captured by a combined Byzantine Empire–Kievan Rus' force, which effectively ends Khazaria's existence.

==== Arabian Empire ====
- January 7 – Fath al-Qal'i, governor of the Citadel of Aleppo, revolts against Emir Mansur ibn Lu'lu', forcing him to flee. Fath accepts an agreement with Salih ibn Mirdas and takes control of Aleppo.

==== Asia ====
- March 10 – Emperor Sanjō of Japan abdicates the throne after a 5-year reign. He is succeeded by his 7-year-old cousin Go-Ichijō as the 68th emperor of Japan. Fujiwara no Michinaga is appointed regent.
- Japanese poet Koshikibu no Naishi (lady-in-waiting to Dowager Empress Shōshi) and her husband Fujiwara no Kiminari (son of Michinaga) have a son, but the couple is not accepted because of the social gap between them.
- Sriwijayan forces attack the Kingdom of Mataram, killing king Dharmawangsa and 6 of his family members.

== Births ==
- April 3 – Xing Zong, emperor of the Liao dynasty. (d. 1055)
- June 9 – Deokjong, ruler of Goryeo (Korea). (d. 1034)
- July 25 – Casimir I the Restorer, duke of Poland. (d. 1058)
- August 24 – Fujiwara no Genshi, Japanese empress. (d. 1039)
- October 28 – Henry III, Holy Roman Emperor. (d. 1056)
- Cao, empress and regent of Song dynasty China. (d. 1079)
- Edward the Exile, son of Edmund II of England. (d. 1057)
- Không Lộ, Vietnamese Zen master (approximate date).
- Minamoto no Tsunenobu, Japanese nobleman. (d. 1097)
- Svein Knutsson, king of Norway. (d. 1035)
- Yan Vyshatich, Kievan nobleman. (d. 1106)

== Deaths ==
- April 23 – Æthelred the Unready, king of England.
- May 22 – Jovan Vladimir, Serbian prince. (b. 990)
- September 6 – Fujiwara no Bokushi, great-grandmother of the Emperor of Japan
- October 18.
  - Ælfric of Hampshire, English nobleman.
  - Eadnoth the Younger, bishop of Dorchester in England.
  - Ulfcytel Snillingr, English nobleman.
- November 30 – Edmund II "Ironside", king of England.
- Badis ibn Mansur, Muslim emir of the Zirid dynasty.
- Henry II "the Good", count of Stade. (b. 946)
- Liu Chenggui, official of Song dynasty China. (b. 951)
- Simeon of Mantua, Armenian Benedictine monk.
- Sulayman ibn al-Hakam, caliph of Córdoba.
- Uhtred the Bold, English nobleman.
- Wulfgar of Abingdon, English abbot.
- Dharmawangsa, king of Mataram.

== Sources ==
- Ambraseys, N. (2009). Earthquakes in the Mediterranean and Middle East: A Multidisciplinary Study of Seismicity up to 1900 (First ed.). Cambridge University Press. pp. 259, 260. ISBN 978-0521872928.
- Benvenuti, Gino (1985). Le Repubbliche Marinare. Amalfi, Pisa, Genova e Venezia (in Italian). Rome: Newton & Compton Editori. p. 33. ISBN 978-8882895297.
- Kleinhenz, Christopher, ed. (2010). Medieval Italy: an encyclopedia. Vol. 1. Routledge. p. 95. ISBN 978-0415939294.
- Palmer, Alan; Palmer, Veronica (1992). Chronology of British History. London: Century Ltd / Barrie & Jenkins. pp. 48–49. ISBN 978-0712656160.
- Williams, Hywel (2005). Cassell's Chronology of World History. Weidenfeld & Nicolson. pp. 105–106. ISBN 978-0304357307.
- Bradbury, Jim (2004). The Routledge Companion to Medieval Warfare. ISBN 0-415-22126-9.
