= Jōjin =

Personal life
- Born: 1011
- Died: 1081 (aged 69–70)
- Occupation: bhikkhu

Religious life
- Religion: Buddhism

Senior posting
- Teacher: Buddha
- Based in: Enryaku-ji on Mount Hiei

Jōjin (Japanese: 成尋; 1011-1081) was a Japanese Tendai monk who documented his journey to the Chinese Buddhist centres of Mount Tiantai and Mount Wutai in 1072–1073 in San Tendai Godai san ki (參天台五臺山記).

Jōjin's home monastery was Enryaku-ji on Mount Hiei. He sent a cache of printed texts back to Japan in 1073 covering translations made since Chōnen's (奝然) mission in 984.

Literature related to Jōjin figures prominently in Nihonjinron - a genre of texts that focuses on issues of Japanese national and cultural identity. They appear in two early anthologies, the more famous being the Shin Kokin Wakashū, the eighth imperially sponsored collection of poetry in Japanese, compiled circa 1205, where, it is preceded by the headnote, "Composed by his mother when the monk Jōjin went to China."

The poem attracted little attention until 1942, when the newspapers that evolved into the present Mainichi Shimbun published Aikoku Hyakunin Isshu (愛国百人一首), literally meaning something like, "One Hundred Patriotic Poems by One Hundred Poets." The title refers to the familiar Hyakunin Isshu, a medieval anthology of one hundred poems, each by a different poet. Because the poems came to be used in a card game played in Japanese homes every New Year, they are among the best known in the classical Japanese poetic canon.
