= 1079 =

1079 in various calendars
- Gregorian calendar: 1079; MLXXIX
- Ab urbe condita: 1832
- Armenian calendar: 528; ԹՎ ՇԻԸ
- Assyrian calendar: 5829
- Balinese saka calendar: 1000–1001
- Bengali calendar: 485–486
- Berber calendar: 2029
- English Regnal year: 13 Will. 1 – 14 Will. 1
- Buddhist calendar: 1623
- Burmese calendar: 441
- Byzantine calendar: 6587–6588
- Chinese calendar: 戊午年 (Earth Horse); 3776 or 3569 — to — 己未年 (Earth Goat); 3777 or 3570
- Coptic calendar: 795–796
- Discordian calendar: 2245
- Ethiopian calendar: 1071–1072
- Hebrew calendar: 4839–4840
- Hindu calendars
- Vikram Samvat: 1135–1136
- Shaka Samvat: 1000–1001
- Kali Yuga: 4179–4180
- Holocene calendar: 11079
- Igbo calendar: 79–80
- Iranian calendar: 457–458
- Islamic calendar: 471–472
- Japanese calendar: Jōryaku 3 (承暦３年)
- Javanese calendar: 983–984
- Julian calendar: 1079; MLXXIX
- Korean calendar: 3412
- Minguo calendar: 833 before ROC 民前833年
- Nanakshahi calendar: −389
- Seleucid era: 1390/1391 AG
- Thai solar calendar: 1621–1622
- Tibetan calendar: ས་ཕོ་རྟ་ལོ་ (male Earth-Horse); 1205 or 824 or 52 — to — ས་མོ་ལུག་ལོ་ (female Earth-Sheep); 1206 or 825 or 53

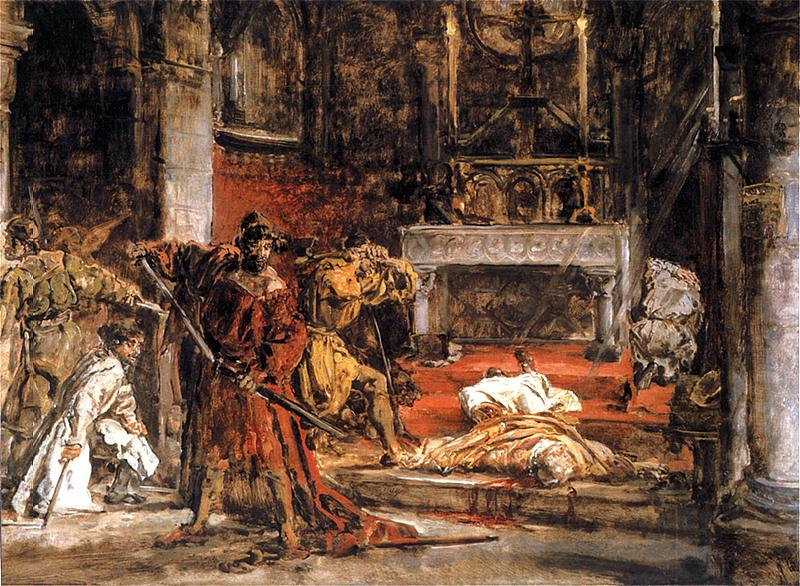
Murder of Bishop Stanislaus of Kraków

Year 1079 (MLXXIX) was a common year starting on Tuesday of the Julian calendar.

== Events ==
=== By place ===
==== Europe ====
- April 11 – Stanislaus of Szczepanów, bishop of Kraków, is executed on orders by King Bolesław II the Generous. The way in which his sentence is carried out causes a revolt among the Polish nobles. Bolesław is forced to flee, to take refuge at the court of King Ladislaus I of Hungary. He is succeeded by his brother Władysław I, as ruler of Poland.
- Battle of Cabra: Moorish forces, aided by Castilian knights under El Cid (Rodrigo Diaz), defeat and rout the invading army of Emir Abdallah ibn Buluggin of Granada, near the town of Cabra (modern Spain).
- Emperor Henry IV appoints Frederick I as duke of Swabia at Hohenstaufen Castle. Henry's 7-year-old daughter Agnes of Waiblingen is betrothed to Frederick who founds the Hohenstaufen Dynasty.
- Upon the death of Håkan the Red, Halsten Stenkilsson returns as king of Sweden, jointly with his brother Inge the Elder (approximate date).

==== England ====
- King William the Conqueror establishes the New Forest in Southern England. He proclaims it as a royal forest, using it for hunting, mainly of deer.

==== Seljuk Empire ====
- The Seljuk Turks under Sultan Suleiman ibn Qutulmish reach and occupy the western coast of Asia Minor, an area known since the Archaic Period (c. 800–c. 500 BC) as Ionia (modern Turkey).

=== By topic ===
==== Astronomy ====
- Omar Khayyam, Persian mathematician and astronomer, calculates a 33 year calendar consisting of 25 ordinary years that include 365 days, and 8 leap years that include 366 days, the most accurate calculation of his time. Khayyam, in his Treatise on Demonstrations of Problems in Algebra, produces a complete classification of cubic equations and their geometric solutions (approximate date).

==== Religion ====
- Constance, queen of Castile and León, founds a monastery in Burgos (approximate date).

== Births ==
- February 11 – Yejong, king of Goryeo (d. 1122)
- April – Urraca, queen regnant of León, Castile and Galicia (d. 1126)
- August 8 – Horikawa, emperor of Japan (d. 1107)
- Abū Ṭāhir al-Silafī, Fatimid scholar and writer (d. 1180)
- Berardo dei Marsi, Italian cardinal and bishop (d. 1130)
- Dangereuse de l'Isle Bouchard, French noblewoman (d. 1151)
- Gampopa, Tibetan Buddhist monk and teacher (d. 1153)
- Kilij Arslan I, sultan of the Sultanate of Rum (d. 1107)
- Liu, Chinese empress of the Song dynasty (d. 1113)
- Peter Abelard, French scholastic philosopher (d. 1142)
- Zheng, Chinese empress of the Song dynasty (d. 1131)
- Approximate date – Diepold III, margrave of Vohburg

== Deaths ==
- January 8 – Adela of France, countess of Flanders (b. 1009)
- February 22 – John of Fécamp, Italian-Norman abbot
- April 11 – Stanislaus of Szczepanów, Polish bishop (b. 1030)
- August 2 – Roman Svyatoslavich, Kievan prince
- August 5 – Hezilo (or Hettilo), bishop of Hildesheim
- October – Atsiz ibn Uwaq, Turkish emir of Damascus
- November 16 – Cao, empress of the Song dynasty (b. 1016)
- Adelaide of Savoy, duchess of Swabia (approximate date)
- Aedh Ua Flaithbheartaigh, king of Iar Connacht
- Al-Jayyānī, Arab scholar and mathematician (b. 989)
- Cellach húa Rúanada, Irish chief ollam and poet
- Håkan the Red, king of Sweden (approximate date)
- Íñigo López, Spanish nobleman (approximate date)
- John of Avranches, French archbishop and writer
- Odo of Rennes, duke and regent of Brittany (b. 999)
- Roger d'Ivry (or Perceval), Norman nobleman
- Wen Tong, Chinese painter and calligrapher (b. 1019)
