= 1075 =

1075 in various calendars
- Gregorian calendar: 1075; MLXXV
- Ab urbe condita: 1828
- Armenian calendar: 524; ԹՎ ՇԻԴ
- Assyrian calendar: 5825
- Balinese saka calendar: 996–997
- Bengali calendar: 481–482
- Berber calendar: 2025
- English Regnal year: 9 Will. 1 – 10 Will. 1
- Buddhist calendar: 1619
- Burmese calendar: 437
- Byzantine calendar: 6583–6584
- Chinese calendar: 甲寅年 (Wood Tiger); 3772 or 3565 — to — 乙卯年 (Wood Rabbit); 3773 or 3566
- Coptic calendar: 791–792
- Discordian calendar: 2241
- Ethiopian calendar: 1067–1068
- Hebrew calendar: 4835–4836
- Hindu calendars
- Vikram Samvat: 1131–1132
- Shaka Samvat: 996–997
- Kali Yuga: 4175–4176
- Holocene calendar: 11075
- Igbo calendar: 75–76
- Iranian calendar: 453–454
- Islamic calendar: 467–468
- Japanese calendar: Jōhō 2 (承保２年)
- Javanese calendar: 979–980
- Julian calendar: 1075; MLXXV
- Korean calendar: 3408
- Minguo calendar: 837 before ROC 民前837年
- Nanakshahi calendar: −393
- Seleucid era: 1386/1387 AG
- Thai solar calendar: 1617–1618
- Tibetan calendar: ཤིང་ཕོ་སྟག་ལོ་ (male Wood-Tiger); 1201 or 820 or 48 — to — ཤིང་མོ་ཡོས་ལོ་ (female Wood-Hare); 1202 or 821 or 49

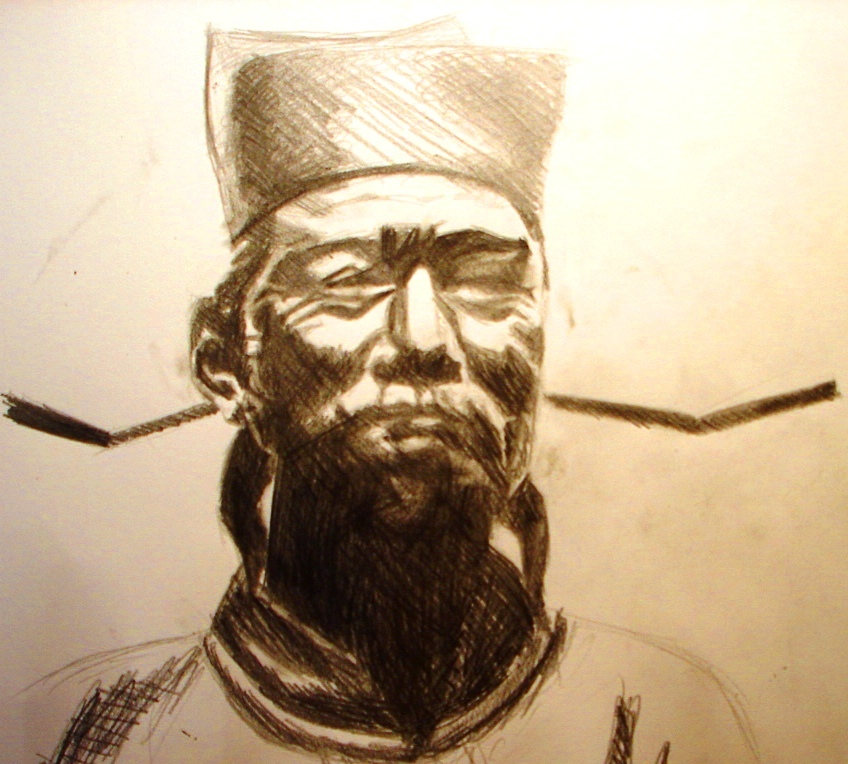
Modern artist impression of Shen Kuo

Year 1075 (MLXXV) was a common year starting on Thursday of the Julian calendar.

== Events ==
=== By place ===
==== Africa ====
- The Kingdom of Mapungubwe is established, in modern-day South Africa.

==== Byzantine Empire ====
- The future Emperor Alexios Komnenos captures the Norman rebel Roussel de Bailleul in Amaseia. Roussel had established a principality in eastern Anatolia in 1073 after rebelling against Emperor Michael VII Doukas, basing his power on his western mercenaries and local support in exchange for protection against invading Turkmen.

==== Europe ====
- June 9 – First Battle of Langensalza: Emperor Henry IV defeats the Saxon nobles on the River Unstrut near Langensalza in Thuringia (modern Germany). He subjugates Saxony, and immediately tries to reassert his rights as the sovereign of northern Italy.
- Anund Gårdske is deposed as king of Svealand (also called Sweden proper). King Håkan the Red of Götaland proclaims himself ruler of all Sweden.

==== England ====
- Revolt of the Earls: The Earls Ralph de Gael, Roger de Breteuil and Waltheof, begin a revolt against King William I (the Conqueror) in the last serious act of resistance to the Norman Conquest.
- Roger de Breteuil is brought before the Great Council. He is deprived of his lands and sentenced to perpetual imprisonment. Ralph de Gael and Waltheof are charged as co-conspirators.
- August 25 – Council of London: Archbishop Lanfranc instigates the movement of English bishoprics. One of these is the bishopric of Sherborne and Wilton which is moved to Old Sarum.

==== Asia ====
- Summer – Shen Kuo, Chinese polymath scientist and statesman, solves a border dispute with the Liao dynasty by dredging up old diplomatic records. He refutes Emperor Dao Zong's bluffs point for point during a meeting at Mt. Yongan (near modern-day Pingquan), reestablishing the rightful borders of the Song dynasty.
- Vietnamese forces under General Lý Thường Kiệt defend Vietnam against a Chinese invasion.
- The Liao dynasty version of the Buddhist Tripiṭaka is completed (approximate date).

=== By topic ===
==== Religion ====
- February – Pope Gregory VII holds a council in the Lateran Palace at Rome. He publishes a decree against laymen investiture (an act which will later cause the Investiture Controversy).
- April – The Dictatus papae (a compilation of 27 statements of powers) are included in the registry of Gregory VII, in which he asserts papal authority over earthly as well as spiritual rulers.
- December 8 – Gregory VII writes a letter of reprimand to Henry IV. He accuses him of breaching his word and continued support of excommunicated councilors.
- December 25 – Gregory VII is kidnapped in the church during Christmas night in Rome and briefly imprisoned by the Roman nobleman Cencio I Frangipane.

== Births ==
- March 18 – Al-Zamakhshari, Persian philosopher (d. 1144)
- April 16 – Orderic Vitalis, English Benedictine chronicler
- June 5 – Tianzuo (Yanning), last emperor of the Liao dynasty
- November 25 – Taizong, emperor of the Jin dynasty (d. 1135)
- Adelaide del Vasto, countess and regent of Sicily (d. 1118)
- Bertha, queen of Aragon and Navarre (approximate date)
- Conrad I, archbishop of Salzburg (approximate date)
- Frederick I, archbishop of Cologne (approximate date)
- Gerald de Windsor, English nobleman (approximate date) (d. 1135)
- Kim Pusik, Korean statesman and general (d. 1151)
- Gisela of Burgundy, Marchioness of Montferrat, French noblewoman (d. 1135)
- Henry IX "the Black", duke of Bavaria (d. 1126)
- Jaya Pala, Indian king of Kamarupa (d. 1100)
- Jinadattasuri, Indian Jain poet and writer (d. 1154)
- Lothair III (or II) of Supplinburg, Holy Roman Emperor (d. 1137)
- Nicholas the Pilgrim, Italian shepherd and saint (d. 1094)
- Norbert of Xanten, archbishop of Magdeburg (d. 1134)
- Raymond Pilet d'Alès, French nobleman (d. 1120)
- Soběslav I (Sobeslaus), duke of Bohemia (d. 1140)
- Svatopluk "the Lion" of Olomouc, duke of Bohemia (d. 1109)
- Tancred, Italo-Norman leader of the First Crusade (d. 1112)

== Deaths ==
- March 29 – Ottokar I (or Otakar), German nobleman
- April 2 – Al-Qa'im, Abbasid caliph in Baghdad (b. 1001)
- April 15 – Erlembald Cotta, Italian military leader
- May 21 – Richeza (or Adelaide), Hungarian queen
- June 9 – Gebhard of Supplinburg, German nobleman
- June 10 – Ernest (the Brave), margrave of Austria (b. 1027)
- June 23 – Theodwin, prince-bishop of Liège
- August 2 – John VIII, patriarch of Constantinople
- August 27 – Minamoto no Yoriyoshi, Japanese nobleman (b. 988)
- November 6 – Fujiwara no Norimichi, Japanese nobleman (b. 996)
- December 4 – Anno II, archbishop of Cologne
- December 13 – Xiao Guanyin, Chinese empress (b. 1040)
- December 18 – Edith of Wessex, English queen
- Alī ibn Ahmad al-Nasawī, Persian mathematician
- Al-Mamun, Andalusian emir of the Taifa of Toledo
- Amhalgaidh mac Cathal, king of Maigh Seóla
- Anne of Kiev (or Agnes), French queen and regent
- Dedi I (or Dedo), margrave of the Saxon Ostmark
- Domnall mac Murchada, king of Leinster and Dublin
- Frederick II, German nobleman and overlord (b. 1005)
- Gofraid mac Amlaíb meic Ragnaill, king of Dublin
- Gundekar II (or Gunzo), bishop of Eichstätt (b. 1019)
- Ibn Butlan, Arab Nestorian Christian physician (b. 1038)
- Ibn Hayyan, Moorish historian and writer (b. 987)
- John Xiphilinus, Byzantine historian (approximate date)
- Peter Krešimir IV, king of Croatia (or 1074)
- Rashid al-Dawla Mahmud, Mirdasid emir of Aleppo
- Siward (or Sigweard), bishop of Rochester
