= Battle of Cruden Bay =

1012 battle in Scotland

The Battle of Cruden Bay is said to have occurred in the summer of 1012 in the North East of Scotland, between Scottish forces led by King Malcolm II, and Norwegians and Danes led by, among others, the teenage son of King Sweyn Forkbeard, who was later to become King Cnut the Great of England.

The 1000th anniversary of the Battle was marked in 2012, but there are several reasons why such a battle is unlikely to have taken place. Most importantly, the 'battle' is not mentioned by any medieval source: more than 500 years passed before it received its first mention in book 11 of John Bellenden's The History and Chronicles of Scotland (1536). Bellenden claimed to have produced a translation of the Latin text of Hector Boece's Chronica Gentis Scotorum (1527), but he added so much material to Boece's already not very reliable text that his Chronicles has been considered an independent new work.

Bellenden fabricated most events surrounding the 'final' confrontation between King Malcolm of Scotland and King Sweyn of Norway in Book 11, chapters 17 and 18 of the Chronicles. Included in his additional material was a brief mention of a battle in Cruden Bay. In fact, he got almost every verifiable detail wrong: for example, he confused Sweyn Forkbeard (de jure king of Norway) with Sweyn Haakonsson (de facto king of Norway), and believed that Canute was King Sweyn Haakonson's brother. He also claimed that King Malcolm dedicated a chapel to St Olave in memory of the post-battle agreement with Canute. St Olave (Olaf II of Norway)) died in 1030, 18 years after the supposed battle of Cruden Bay. Olave was venerated as a saint in Nidaros, Norway, the year following his death, but he was not officially recognised as a saint until 1164. Malcolm died in 1034, one hundred and thirty years before Olave's canonisation.

A battle in Cruden Bay would have made no military sense for the Danes. In the summer of 1012, either Sweyn Forkbeard or Canute's foster-father, Thorkell the Tall, led a Danish army that attacked and took Canterbury before collecting Danegeld of 48,000 pounds silver from the English, and in the month of December the following year Sweyn Forkbeard was made king of England. Whether the 1012 invasion was commanded by Sweyn or Thorkell, heavy fighting and disruption in England mean that it is unlikely that Canute's (foster-)father would have allowed Canute to weaken efforts to consolidate their military gains by taking an invasion force to Scotland.

Allegedly, the village of Cruden Bay's name is derived from the Gaelic Croch Dain or Croivdan, meaning 'Slaughter of the Danes'. The etymology originates in John Bellenden's work and neither 'croiv' nor 'croch' is recorded as having that translated meaning in Scottish Gaelic dictionaries.
