= 987 =

Calendar year

987 in various calendars
- Gregorian calendar: 987; CMLXXXVII
- Ab urbe condita: 1740
- Armenian calendar: 436; ԹՎ ՆԼԶ
- Assyrian calendar: 5737
- Balinese saka calendar: 908–909
- Bengali calendar: 393–394
- Berber calendar: 1937
- Buddhist calendar: 1531
- Burmese calendar: 349
- Byzantine calendar: 6495–6496
- Chinese calendar: 丙戌年 (Fire Dog); 3684 or 3477 — to — 丁亥年 (Fire Pig); 3685 or 3478
- Coptic calendar: 703–704
- Discordian calendar: 2153
- Ethiopian calendar: 979–980
- Hebrew calendar: 4747–4748
- Hindu calendars
- Vikram Samvat: 1043–1044
- Shaka Samvat: 908–909
- Kali Yuga: 4087–4088
- Holocene calendar: 10987
- Iranian calendar: 365–366
- Islamic calendar: 376–377
- Japanese calendar: Kanna 3 / Eien 1 (永延元年)
- Javanese calendar: 888–889
- Julian calendar: 987; CMLXXXVII
- Korean calendar: 3320
- Minguo calendar: 925 before ROC 民前925年
- Nanakshahi calendar: −481
- Seleucid era: 1298/1299 AG
- Thai solar calendar: 1529–1530
- Tibetan calendar: མེ་ཕོ་ཁྱི་ལོ་ (male Fire-Dog); 1113 or 732 or −40 — to — མེ་མོ་ཕག་ལོ་ (female Fire-Boar); 1114 or 733 or −39

Year 987 (CMLXXXVII) was a common year starting on Saturday of the Julian calendar.

== Events ==
=== By place ===
==== Byzantine Empire ====
- February 7 – Bardas Phokas (the Younger) and Bardas Skleros, two members of the military elite, begin a wide-scale rebellion against Emperor Basil II. They overrun Anatolia, and Phokas declares himself Emperor. Basil applies for military assistance from Prince Vladimir the Great, ruler of Kievan Rus', who agrees to help him and sends a Varangian army (6,000 men).

==== Europe ====
- Al-Mansur, the de facto ruler of Al-Andalus, occupies the city of Coimbra (modern Portugal).
- July 3 – After the last Carolingian king of West Francia, Louis V, had died in May, Hugh Capet is crowned king at Noyon.
- December – The 15-year-old Robert (the son of Hugh Capet) is crowned co-ruler of France around Christmas at Orléans.
- The population of Bari revolts against the Byzantine Empire.

==== Africa ====
- The Zirid Dynasty fails to reconquer the western part of the Maghreb (Land of Atlas), which they have recently lost to the Umayyad Caliphate.

== Births ==
- Al-Mahdi al-Husayn, Zaidi imam of Yemen (d. 1013)
- Ibn Hayyan, Moorish writer and historian (d. 1075)
- Li, imperial consort of the Song Dynasty (d. 1032)
- Liu Yong, Chinese poet of the Song Dynasty (d. 1053)

== Deaths ==
- January 10 – Pietro I Orseolo, doge of Venice (b. 928)
- March 30 – Arnulf II (the Younger), Frankish nobleman
- May 21 – Louis V, king of the West Frankish Kingdom
- July 13 – Abu'l-Fawaris Ahmad ibn Ali, Ikhshidid governor
- July 21 – Geoffrey I (Greymantle), Frankish nobleman
- September 8 (approximate date) – Adalbert I, Count of Vermandois, Frankish nobleman
- November 16 – Shen Lun, Chinese scholar-official
