= 1085 =

1085 in various calendars
- Gregorian calendar: 1085; MLXXXV
- Ab urbe condita: 1838
- Armenian calendar: 534; ԹՎ ՇԼԴ
- Assyrian calendar: 5835
- Balinese saka calendar: 1006–1007
- Bengali calendar: 491–492
- Berber calendar: 2035
- English Regnal year: 19 Will. 1 – 20 Will. 1
- Buddhist calendar: 1629
- Burmese calendar: 447
- Byzantine calendar: 6593–6594
- Chinese calendar: 甲子年 (Wood Rat); 3782 or 3575 — to — 乙丑年 (Wood Ox); 3783 or 3576
- Coptic calendar: 801–802
- Discordian calendar: 2251
- Ethiopian calendar: 1077–1078
- Hebrew calendar: 4845–4846
- Hindu calendars
- Vikram Samvat: 1141–1142
- Shaka Samvat: 1006–1007
- Kali Yuga: 4185–4186
- Holocene calendar: 11085
- Igbo calendar: 85–86
- Iranian calendar: 463–464
- Islamic calendar: 477–478
- Japanese calendar: Ōtoku 2 (応徳２年)
- Javanese calendar: 989–990
- Julian calendar: 1085; MLXXXV
- Korean calendar: 3418
- Minguo calendar: 827 before ROC 民前827年
- Nanakshahi calendar: −383
- Seleucid era: 1396/1397 AG
- Thai solar calendar: 1627–1628
- Tibetan calendar: ཤིང་ཕོ་བྱི་བ་ལོ་ (male Wood-Rat); 1211 or 830 or 58 — to — ཤིང་མོ་གླང་ལོ་ (female Wood-Ox); 1212 or 831 or 59

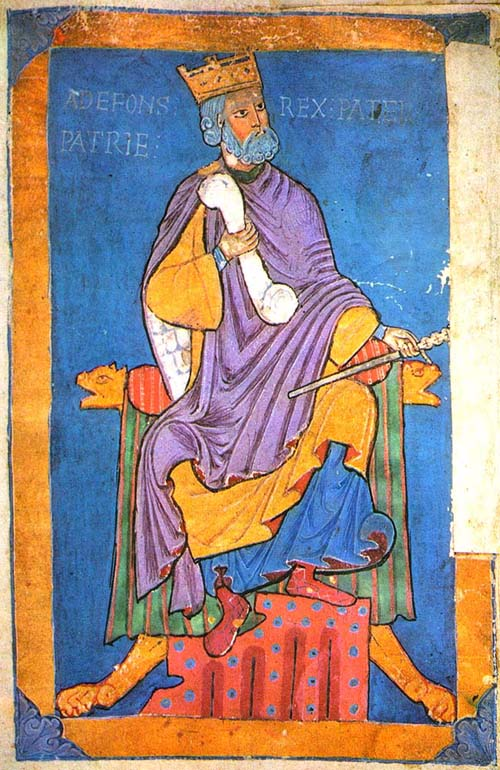
KIng Alfonso VI of León and Castile ("the Brave") (r. 1077–1109)

Year 1085 (MLXXXV) was a common year starting on Wednesday of the Julian calendar.

== Events ==
=== By place ===
==== Europe ====
- May 25 – King Alfonso VI of León and Castile ("the Brave") recaptures Toledo from the Moors, and occupies other cities such as Madrid and Talavera (including the castle of Aledo). Alfonso moves his capital to Toledo, and consolidates his power between Sistema Central and the Tagus River, from where he launches more attacks against the taifas of Córdoba, Seville, Badajoz and Granada (modern Spain).
- Summer – Robert Guiscard heads for the Ionian Islands despite an epidemic among troops on Corfu. His son, Roger Borsa, lands on Cephalonia but Guiscard falls sick as his ship approaches the northernmost headland and is carried ashore, where he dies of fever (on July 17).
- Emperor Henry IV declares the Peace of God in all the imperial territories of the Holy Roman Empire to quell any sedition.
- June 15 – Vratislaus II, a son of Duke Bretislav I, becomes the first king of Bohemia and is elevated 'for life' by Henry IV.
- Katedralskolan in Lund (modern Sweden), the oldest school in Scandinavia, is founded by King Canute IV of Denmark.

==== England ====
- The Domesday Survey is commissioned by King William the Conqueror, apparently prompted by the abortive invasion of Canute IV, to ensure proper taxation and levies.

==== China ====
- April 1 – Emperor Zhezong ascends the throne at the age of 8 under the supervision of his grandmother, Grand Empress Dowager Gao. She cancels the reform policy of Chancellor Wang Anshi.
- The output of copper currency for the Chinese Song dynasty reaches 6 billion coins a year, prompting the Chinese government to adopt the world's first paper-printed money later in the 1120s.

== Births ==
- September 19 – Maria Komnene, Byzantine princess
- Ahmad Sanjar, Seljuk ruler of Khorasan (approximate date)
- Alberich of Reims, archbishop of Bourges (approximate date)
- Avempace, Andalusian polymath and philosopher (d. 1138)
- Constantine Komnenos, Byzantine aristocrat (approximate date)
- Elizabeth of Vermandois, English countess (approximate date)
- Floris II ("the Fat"), count of Holland (approximate date)
- Gilbert of Sempringham, English priest (approximate date)
- Imad ad-Din Zengi, Seljuk ruler of Mosul (approximate date)
- Meginhard I, count of Sponheim (approximate date)
- Otomae, Japanese female singer and musician (d. 1169)
- Otto II the Black, Moravian prince (approximate date)
- Ralph I (or Raoul), count of Vermandois (approximate date)
- Robert fitz Martin, Norman knight and nobleman (d. 1159)
- Stephen of Obazine, French priest and hermit (d. 1154)
- Waleran II, duke of Lower Lorraine (approximate date)
- William of Montevergine, Italian monk and abbot (d. 1142)
- William, Count of Sully ("the Simple"), French nobleman (approximate date)
- Zhang Zeduan, Chinese landscape painter (d. 1145)
- Zhu Bian, Chinese diplomat, poet and writer (d. 1144)

== Deaths ==
- January 3 – Williram of Ebersberg, German abbot
- April 1 – Shenzong, emperor of Song dynasty China (b. 1048)
- May 25 – Gregory VII, pope of the Catholic Church
- May 27 – Gundred, Countess of Surrey (or Gundreda), English noblewoman
- June 19 – Vitalis of Bernay, Norman monk and abbot
- July 17 – Robert Guiscard, Norman warrior and nobleman
- August 19 – Al-Juwayni, Persian scholar and imam (b. 1028)
- September 20 – Hermann II, German nobleman (b. 1049)
- Alfanus I (or Alfano), Italian physician and archbishop
- Al-Lakhmi, Fatimid scholar, jurist and writer (b. 1006)
- Cheng Hao, Chinese neo-Confucian philosopher (b. 1032)
- Maitripada, Indian Buddhist philosopher (b. 1007)
- Osbern Giffard, Norman nobleman (approximate date)
- Wang Gui, Chinese official and chancellor (b. 1019)
- Yūsuf Balasaguni, Karakhanid statesman (b. 1019)
