= 1034 =

Calendar year

1034 in various calendars
- Gregorian calendar: 1034; MXXXIV
- Ab urbe condita: 1787
- Armenian calendar: 483; ԹՎ ՆՁԳ
- Assyrian calendar: 5784
- Balinese saka calendar: 955–956
- Bengali calendar: 440–441
- Berber calendar: 1984
- English Regnal year: N/A
- Buddhist calendar: 1578
- Burmese calendar: 396
- Byzantine calendar: 6542–6543
- Chinese calendar: 癸酉年 (Water Rooster); 3731 or 3524 — to — 甲戌年 (Wood Dog); 3732 or 3525
- Coptic calendar: 750–751
- Discordian calendar: 2200
- Ethiopian calendar: 1026–1027
- Hebrew calendar: 4794–4795
- Hindu calendars
- Vikram Samvat: 1090–1091
- Shaka Samvat: 955–956
- Kali Yuga: 4134–4135
- Holocene calendar: 11034
- Igbo calendar: 34–35
- Iranian calendar: 412–413
- Islamic calendar: 425–426
- Japanese calendar: Chōgen 7 (長元７年)
- Javanese calendar: 936–938
- Julian calendar: 1034; MXXXIV
- Korean calendar: 3367
- Minguo calendar: 878 before ROC 民前878年
- Nanakshahi calendar: −434
- Seleucid era: 1345/1346 AG
- Thai solar calendar: 1576–1577
- Tibetan calendar: ཆུ་མོ་བྱ་ལོ་ (female Water-Bird); 1160 or 779 or 7 — to — ཤིང་ཕོ་ཁྱི་ལོ་ (male Wood-Dog); 1161 or 780 or 8

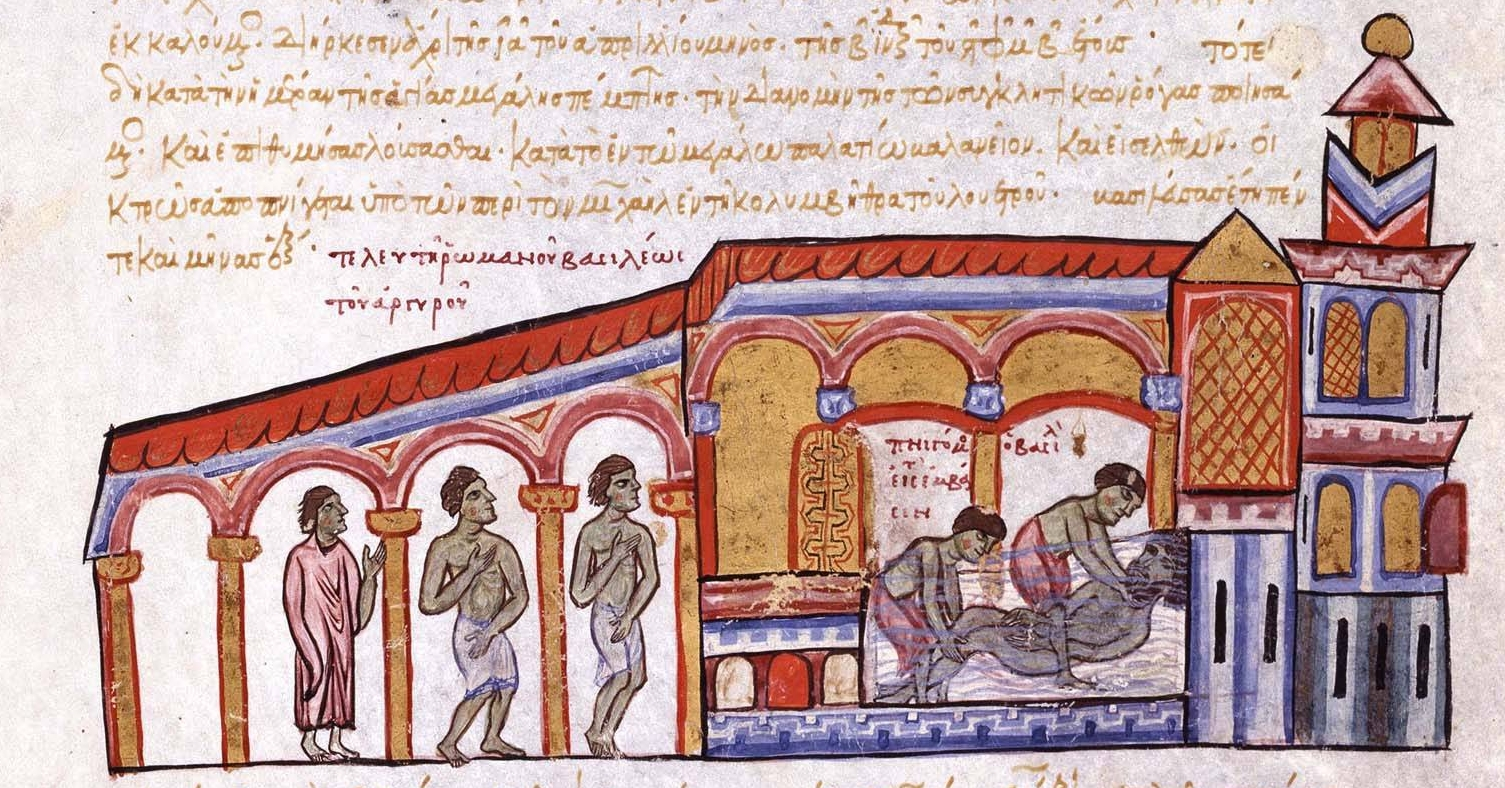
The murder of Romanos III in his bath.

Year 1034 (MXXXIV) was a common year starting on Tuesday of the Julian calendar.

== Events ==
=== By place ===
==== Byzantine Empire ====
- April 11 – Emperor Romanos III (Argyros) is drowned in his bath, at the urging of his wife Zoë, who marries her chamberlain, and elevates him to the throne of the Byzantine Empire, as Michael IV. Romanos is buried in the Church of St. Mary Peribleptos in Constantinople.

==== Europe ====
- Spring – Emperor Conrad II (the Elder) leads a German military expedition via the Rhone River into Burgundy, while two Italian armies led by Archbishop Aribert and Boniface III (margrave of Tuscany) head over the Alps and join with Count Humbert I at Great St. Bernard Pass.
- March – Conrad II converges his armies on Lake Lemano and defeats Count Odo II in battle at Geneva (modern Switzerland). For his assistance, Conrad grants Humbert I with the Burgundian county of Maurienne.
- May – King Mieszko II dies after a 6-year reign (probably killed as a result of a conspiracy) and is succeeded by his 17-year-old son Casimir I (the Restorer). A violent revolt spreads throughout Poland.
- King Sancho III (the Great) of Pamplona captures León, after defeating a string of rivals. His rule now extends from the borders of Galicia in the west to the County of Barcelona in the east.
- Summer – Poland is broken up into regions (during the so-called Pagan Reaction). Queen Richeza, Casimir I and his sisters Ryksa and Gertruda are driven into exile in Germany.
- November 25 – King Malcolm II dies in battle at Glamis. He is succeeded by Duncan I, son of his eldest daughter, rather than Macbeth, who is possibly another grandson of his.
- In Al-Andalus, benefiting from the weakening of the Muslim central authority, the count of Portugal, Gonçalo Maia, conquers Montemor-o-Velho (approximate date).
- Franche-Comté becomes subject to the Holy Roman Empire.

==== Africa ====
- A Pisan and Genovese fleet attack Bona (modern Annaba) on the Maghribi coast (modern Algeria). The city is occupied for one year.

== Births ==
- Joscelin I de Courtenay, French nobleman (House of Courtenay)
- Khön Könchok Gyalpo, founder of Sakya Monastery (d. 1102)

== Deaths ==
- February 21 – Hawise of Normandy, French duchess and regent
- March 21 – Ezzo (or Ehrenfried), German count palatine
- April 11 – Romanos III (Argyros), Byzantine emperor (b. 968)
- October 31 – Deokjong, ruler of Goryeo (Korea) (b. 1016)
- November 9 – Oldřich (or Odalric), duke of Bohemia
- November 19 – Theodoric II, margrave of Lower Lusatia
- November 25 – Malcolm II, king of Alba (Scotland)
- December 8 – Æthelric (or Brihtmær), English bishop
- Adémar de Chabannes, French monk and historian
- Ali ibn Hasan (Ali-Tegin), Karakhanid ruler (khagan)
- Amlaíb mac Sitriuc, Norse-Gaelic king of Dublin
- Bernard Roger, French nobleman (approximate date)
- Manuchihr I, Persian ruler (shah) of Shirvan
- Matilda of Franconia, daughter of Conrad II
- Mieszko II (St. Lambert), king of Poland
- Qian Weiyan, Chinese politician and poet
- Salim ibn Mustafad, Mirdasid rebel leader
- Samuel ben Hofni, Jewish rabbi and writer
