= 1058 =

1058 in various calendars
Gregorian calendar	1058; MLVIII
Ab urbe condita	1811
Armenian calendar	507; ԹՎ ՇԷ
Assyrian calendar	5808
Balinese saka calendar	979–980
Bengali calendar	464–465
Berber calendar	2008
English Regnal year	N/A
Buddhist calendar	1602
Burmese calendar	420
Byzantine calendar	6566–6567
Chinese calendar	丁酉年 (Fire Rooster); 3755 or 3548 — to — 戊戌年 (Earth Dog); 3756 or 3549
Coptic calendar	774–775
Discordian calendar	2224
Ethiopian calendar	1050–1051
Hebrew calendar	4818–4819
- Hindu calendars
Vikram Samvat	1114–1115
Shaka Samvat	979–980
Kali Yuga	4158–4159
Holocene calendar	11058
Igbo calendar	58–59
Iranian calendar	436–437
Islamic calendar	449–450
Japanese calendar	Tengi 6 / Kōhei 1 (康平元年)
Javanese calendar	961–962
Julian calendar	1058; MLVIII
Korean calendar	3391
Minguo calendar	854 before ROC 民前854年
Nanakshahi calendar	−410
Seleucid era	1369/1370 AG
Thai solar calendar	1600–1601
Tibetan calendar	阴火鸡年 (female Fire-Rooster); 1184 or 803 or 31 — to — 阳土狗年 (male Earth-Dog); 1185 or 804 or 32

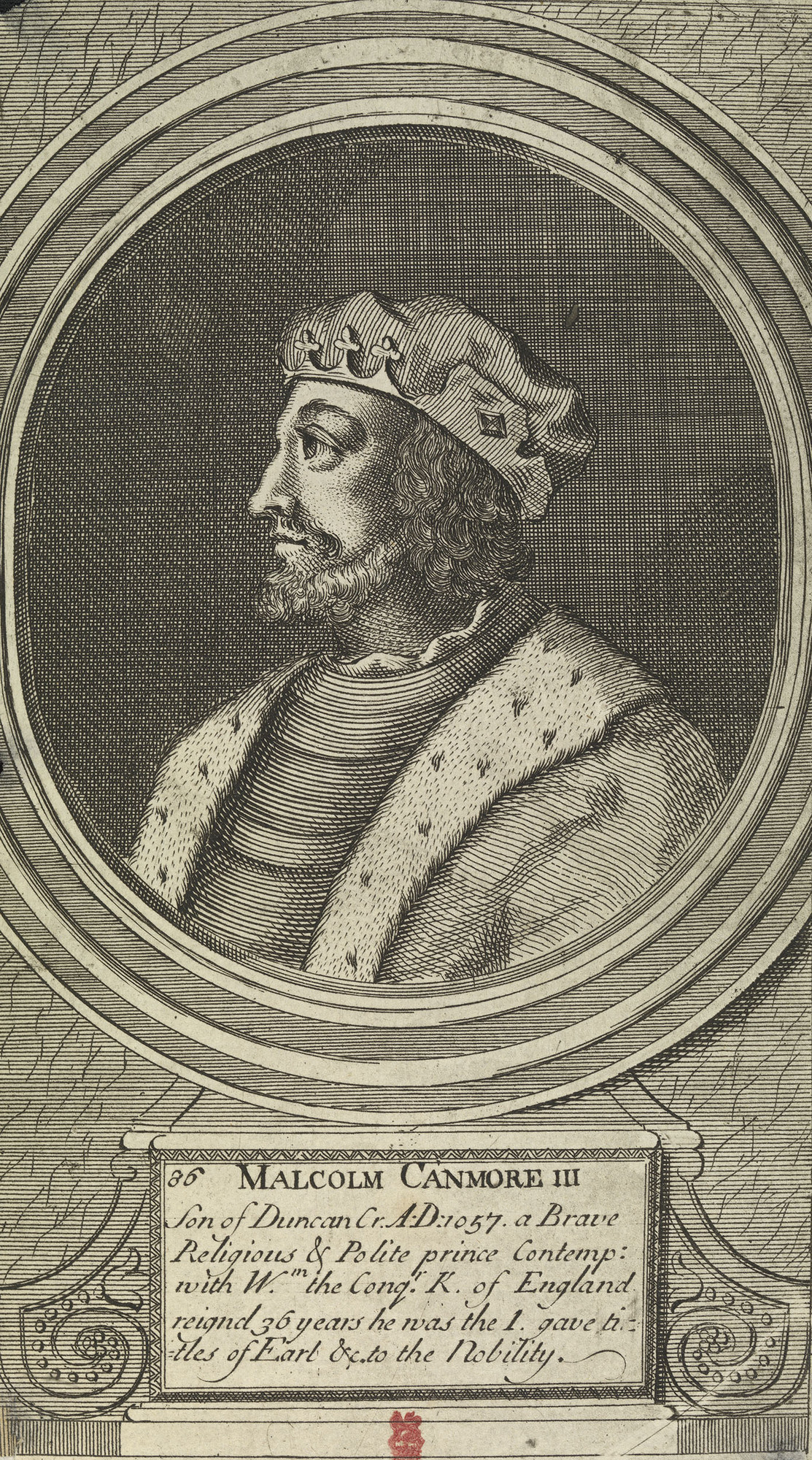
King Malcolm III of Scotland (c. 1031–1093)

Year 1058 (MLVIII) was a common year starting on Thursday of the Julian calendar.

== Events ==
=== By place ===
==== Europe ====
- March 17 – King Lulach ("the Unfortunate") of Scotland is killed in battle against his cousin and rival Malcolm III ("Canmore") who becomes king of the Scots.
- September 20 – Empress Agnes de Poitou and King Andrew I ("the White") of Hungary meet to negotiate about the border zone in Burgenland (modern Austria).
- 4-year-old Judith of Swabia, youngest daughter of the late Henry III, Holy Roman Emperor, is engaged to Prince Solomon of Hungary at Regensburg.
- Norman conquest of southern Italy: Norman forces under Richard Drengot besiege and capture Capua. He takes the princely title from Prince Landulf VIII.
- Bolesław II the Generous, eldest son of Casimir I the Restorer, succeeds his father after his death in Poznań and becomes duke of Poland.

==== Africa ====
- The Almoravids conquer the Barghawata, a group of Berber tribes, who have established an independent state in modern-day Morocco.

=== By topic ===
==== Religion ====
- Spring – Pope Stephen IX pronounces on the authenticity of the relics of Mary Magdalene at Vézelay Abbey in Burgundy, making it a major centre of pilgrimage.
- March 29 – Stephen IX dies of a severe illness after a pontificate of 7 months at Florence. He is succeeded by Nicholas II who will be installed the following year.
- November 6 – Byzantine Emperor Isaac I Komnenos deposes Michael I Cerularius, patriarch of Constantinople, and has him exiled to Prokonnessos (until 1059).
- Ealdred, archbishop of York, becomes the first English bishop to make a pilgrimage to Jerusalem.

== Births ==
- Al-Ghazali, Persian theologian and jurist (approximate date)
- Ibn Bassam, Andalusian poet and historian (d. 1147)
- Synadene, queen consort of Hungary (approximate date)
- Theodora Anna Doukaina Selvo, Venetian dogaressa (d. 1083)
- Wynebald de Ballon, Norman nobleman (approximate date)

== Deaths ==
- March 1 – Ermesinde, countess and regent of Barcelona
- March 17 – Lulach ("the Unfortunate"), king of Scotland
- March 29 – Stephen IX, pope of the Catholic Church
- August 2 – Judith of Schweinfurt, duchess of Bohemia
- November 28 – Casimir I the Restorer, duke of Poland (b. 1016)
- Abdollah ibn Bukhtishu, Syrian physician (b. 980)
- Abu Muhammad al-Yazuri, vizier of the Fatimid Caliphate
- Ælfwold II, bishop of Sherborne (approximate date)
- Al-Mawardi, Abbasid jurist and diplomat (b. 972)
- Boite mac Cináeda (or Bodhe), Scottish prince
- Centule IV Gaston ("the Old"), viscount of Béarn
- Egbert of Fulda, German Benedictine abbot
- Fakhruddin As'ad Gurgani, Persian poet and writer
- Flaithem Mac Mael Gaimrid, Irish poet and Chief Ollam
- Grigor Magistros, Armenian prince and governor
- Ilduara Mendes, countess and regent of Portugal
- Theophanu, abbess of Essen and Gerresheim
- William VII ("the Bold"), duke of Aquitaine (b. 1023)
