= Unger (bishop of Poland) =

Polish Catholic bishop

Unger (died 9 June 1012) was a bishop at Poznań, after the year 1000 bishop of Poznań, independent from archbishop of Gniezno.

He became bishop in 982, probably as a missionary of unknown territory. Probably after failure of his mission, he became abbot of a monastery in Memleben (Unger kept this title till end of his life).

Most probably in 991 or 992 Unger arrived to Poland as a successor of Jordan who died in 984. After creation of new Polish metropolis in Gniezno with archbishop Radim Gaudentius he forced keeping independence of Poznań bishopric from new ecclesiastical province.

During his trip to Rome, where he was sent by Bolesław I of Poland, in 1004, Unger was imprisoned in Magdeburg and probably forced by local archbishop to recognize his pastoral governance (presented in later centuries document that was proof of this cession is rather falsificate). This hypothetical recognition was used in early 12th century by Magdeburg bishops to claim rights to throne of Poznań bishops. According to known evidences Unger never return to Poland and died in Magdeburg on 9 June 1012.
