= 1013 =

Calendar year

1013 in various calendars
- Gregorian calendar: 1013; MXIII
- Ab urbe condita: 1766
- Armenian calendar: 462; ԹՎ ՆԿԲ
- Assyrian calendar: 5763
- Balinese saka calendar: 934–935
- Bengali calendar: 419–420
- Berber calendar: 1963
- English Regnal year: N/A
- Buddhist calendar: 1557
- Burmese calendar: 375
- Byzantine calendar: 6521–6522
- Chinese calendar: 壬子年 (Water Rat); 3710 or 3503 — to — 癸丑年 (Water Ox); 3711 or 3504
- Coptic calendar: 729–730
- Discordian calendar: 2179
- Ethiopian calendar: 1005–1006
- Hebrew calendar: 4773–4774
- Hindu calendars
- Vikram Samvat: 1069–1070
- Shaka Samvat: 934–935
- Kali Yuga: 4113–4114
- Holocene calendar: 11013
- Igbo calendar: 13–14
- Iranian calendar: 391–392
- Islamic calendar: 403–404
- Japanese calendar: Chōwa 2 (長和２年)
- Javanese calendar: 915–916
- Julian calendar: 1013; MXIII
- Korean calendar: 3346
- Minguo calendar: 899 before ROC 民前899年
- Nanakshahi calendar: −455
- Seleucid era: 1324/1325 AG
- Thai solar calendar: 1555–1556
- Tibetan calendar: ཆུ་ཕོ་བྱི་བ་ལོ་ (male Water-Rat); 1139 or 758 or −14 — to — ཆུ་མོ་གླང་ལོ་ (female Water-Ox); 1140 or 759 or −13

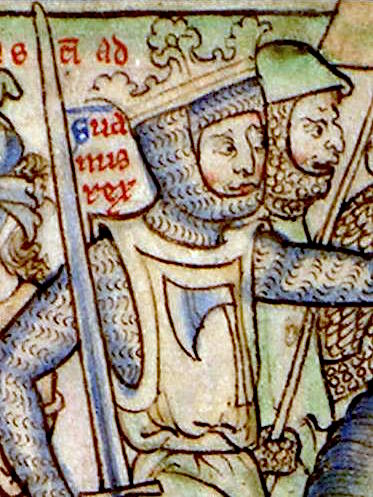
King Sweyn Forkbeard (960–1014)

Year 1013 (MXIII) was a common year starting on Thursday of the Julian calendar.

== Events ==
=== By place ===
==== Europe ====
- King Henry II of Germany signs a peace treaty at Merseburg with Duke Bolesław I the Brave of Poland. As part of the treaty, Bolesław pays homage and recognizes Henry as his overlord in exchange for receiving the March of Lusatia (including the town of Bautzen) and the March of Meissen as fiefs. To seal their peace, Bolesław's son Mieszko II marries Richeza of Lotharingia (granddaughter of the late Emperor Otto II).
- Sulayman ibn al-Hakam reconquers the Caliphate of Córdoba in Al-Andalus (modern Spain) and deposes Hisham II. Sulayman becomes the fifth Umayyad caliph of Córdoba (until 1016).
- Winter – Henry II (anxious to be crowned as Holy Roman Emperor) mobilises a German expeditionary army at Augsburg, to begin his second Italian military campaign.

==== England ====
- Summer – Danish Viking raiders led by Sweyn Forkbeard (accompanied by his son Cnut) sail from Denmark to attack England. Again London defends itself and the Vikings move elsewhere, plundering Wessex, Mercia and Northumbria. King Æthelred the Unready sends his sons Edward and Alfred to Normandy. Æthelred retreats to the Isle of Wight and follows them later into exile.
- December 25 – Sweyn Forkbeard takes control of the Danelaw and is proclaimed king of England in London. Some of the English provinces refuse to pay homage to Sweyn, who has no dynastic right to claim the throne.

==== Asia ====
- September – Emperor Sanjō of Japan visits the home of influential statesman Fujiwara no Michinaga.
- December – Fujiwara no Masanobu, an officer of the guard of empress consort Kenshi of Japan, is killed by Fujiwara no Korekane and Michinaga orders the assassin imprisoned.
- The Four Great Books of Song, the Song dynasty Chinese encyclopedia Prime Tortoise of the Record Bureau which has been compiled since 1005, is completed in 1,000 volumes of 9.4 million written Chinese characters.
- Kaifeng, capital of China, becomes the largest city of the world, taking the lead from Córdoba in Al-Andalus (modern Spain).

=== By topic ===
==== Religion ====
- Æthelred II appoints Lyfing as archbishop of Canterbury in England. He restores Canterbury Cathedral, adding porticus towers and a massive westwork.
- Beauvais changes from a county to a bishopric (approximate date).

== Births ==
- July 18 – Hermann of Reichenau, German music theorist (d. 1054)
- August 15 – Teishi (Yōmeimon-in), Japanese empress consort (d. 1094)
- September 22 – Richeza (or Adelaide), queen of Hungary (d. 1075)
- Abu al-Walid al-Baji, Moorish scholar and poet (d. 1081)
- Guaimar IV of Salerno, Italian nobleman (approximate date)
- Isaac Alfasi, Algerian Talmudist and posek (d. 1103)

== Deaths ==
- April 19 – Hisham II, caliph of Córdoba (Spain) (b. 966)
- June 5 – Al-Baqillani, Arab theologian, jurist and logician
- c. August – Mufarrij ibn Daghfal ibn al-Jarrah, Jarrahid emir (b. c. 977)
- Al-Mahdi al-Husayn, Zaidi imam of Yemen (b. 987)
- Abu al-Qasim al-Zahrawi, Arab physician, "father of surgery", author of Al-Tasrif (b. 936)
- Giselbert I, count of Roussillon (Spain) (or 1004)
- Reginar IV, French nobleman (approximate date)

== Sources ==
- Chandler, Tertius (1989). Four Thousand Years of Urban Growth. Edwin Mellen Press. ISBN 978-0889462076.
- Palmer, Alan; Palmer, Veronica (1992). Chronology of British History. London: Century Ltd / Barrie & Jenkins. pp. 48–49. ISBN 978-0712656160.
- Rosenberg, Matt T. (2001). "Largest Cities Through History". About.com. Archived from the original on February 18, 2001.
- Williams, Hywel (2005). Cassell's Chronology of World History. Weidenfeld & Nicolson. pp. 105–106. ISBN 978-0304357307.
