= Simeon of Mantua =

Benedictine monk

Saint Simeon of Mantua
- Born: 10th century Armenia
- Died: AD 1016; Mantua
- Venerated in: Catholic Church
- Beatified: 1024 by Pope Benedict VIII
- Canonized: 1049 by Pope Leo IX
- Feast: July 26

Simeon of Mantua (9??–1016) was a Benedictine monk of Armenian origin who was canonized as a saint in the late 11th century.

Little is known of Simeon's early life, but at some time he left his homeland and spent some years living as a hermit in Palestine. After this, he is known to have visited Rome, where his exoticism led to his harassment by a Roman mob. Papal intervention calmed this situation. By order of Benedict VII, he was examined and found to be orthodox. He was renowned for his piety and heroic charity, and for numerous miracles performed during life and after death. In the following period, Simeon traveled across Italy, France, and Spain before returning to northern Italy, joining a Benedictine monastery near Mantua, where he became known for his kindness and generosity. He died in Mantua in 1016.

His cult was approved by Benedict VIII (1024) and Leo IX (1049). In 1913 his relics were solemnly exposed. His tomb was a reported site of numerous miracles, which contributed to his canonization in the mid 11th century. A local noble, Marchese Boniface III of Montferrat, later rebuilt a local church and dedicated it in Simeon's honor.

== Sources ==
- Southern, R.W.. The Making of the Middle Ages. Yale University Press, 1953, p. 70.
- Benedictine Monks of st Augustines Abbey Ramsgate. Book of the Saints. A & C Black Publishers Ltd, 2003, p. 245
