= Liu Chenggui =

Song China government official (951–1016)

Liu Chenggui (Chinese: 劉承規, originally 劉承珪; 951–1016), posthumous name Zhongsu (忠肅), was a government official of the Chinese Northern Song dynasty.

He was the official in charge of the court treasury upon the ascension of Emperor Taizong in 976, and was charged with the task of standardizing the weights and measures. After a thorough examination, he determined that the existing measurement devices were largely not up to the task, and proceeded to research and develop a new type of balance that was later known as the dengzi (戥子). Because of its small size and precision, the dengzi continued on for centuries as a tool for weighing precious metals and medicines. He also used to kinds of dengzi to cast standard weights in series and promulgate them throughout the empire.
