= Abu'l-Abbas ibn al-Furat =

Abu'l-Abbas ibn Ja'far ibn al-Furat was the son of the powerful Ikhshidid vizier Ja'far ibn al-Furat. He was in turn appointed vizier by the Fatimid caliph al-Hakim (r. 996–1021) in 1014/5, but executed after a few days.

== Sources ==
- Lev, Yaacov (1991). State and Society in Fatimid Egypt. Leiden: Brill. ISBN 9789004093447.
- Sourdel, D. (1971). "Ibn al-Furāt". In Lewis, B.; Ménage, V. L.; Pellat, Ch. & Schacht, J. (eds.). The Encyclopaedia of Islam, Second Edition. Volume III: H–Iram. Leiden: E. J. Brill. pp. 767–768. OCLC 495469525.
