= Battle of Pontlevoy =

Large medieval battle

Coordinates: 47.390249°N 1.254324°E

The Battle of Pontlevoy was fought on 6 July 1016 between the forces of Fulk III of Anjou and Herbert I of Maine on one side and Odo II of Blois on the other. It was one of the largest battles of early medieval France and was determining of the balance of power in the Loire Valley for years after it was fought.

The battle took place near Pontlevoy, between Blois and Tours, not far from the large Angevin fortress of Montrichard on the river Cher. Odo had ravaged most of the Touraine during Fulk's absence on a pilgrimage to the Holy Land. After Fulk's return, Odo, with a large force and many siege engines, attempted to besiege Montrichard, but was intercepted by Fulk just north of Pontlevoy. Surprised by Fulk's preparedness, Odo was forced to give battle without putting his troops into formation. This was his disadvantage. The opening went in favour of Odo, however. Fulk was unhorsed and his standard-bearer was felled. Fulk may have even been captured briefly. At this juncture, Herbert intervened, attacking Odo's flank from the west. Odo was routed and fled, leaving his infantry to be massacred.
