= Carnen Ua Cadhla =

Carnen Ua Cadhla, king of Conmaicne Mara, died 1014.

Ua Cadhla commanded a contingent of the Conmaice Mara at the Battle of Clontarf.
