= Không Lộ =

Dương Minh Nghiêm, known as Dương Không Lộ (Vietnamese: 楊空路, 1016-1094, or 1119) was a fisherman turned Thiền master of Annam. His most famous disciple was the monk Giác Hải.
