= Liu Zong (Song dynasty) =

Government official from the Song dynasty

Liu Zong (Chinese: 劉綜, (?–1015)) was a Chinese government official of the Song Dynasty.

== Biography ==
- Jian'an Jun zhi mou jun shi (Chinese: 建安軍知某軍事)
- shu mi zhi xue shi (Chinese: 樞密直學士)
- tai chang si cheng (Chinese: 太常寺丞)
- you jian yi da fu (Chinese: 右諫議大夫)
- Lu Zhou zhi mou zhou jun zhou shi (Chinese: 廬州知某州軍州事)
- shang shu sheng li bu lang zhong (Chinese: 尚書省吏部郎中)
- Kaifeng Fu zhi mou fu jun fu shi (Chinese: 開封府知某府軍府事)
- quan zhi kai feng fu (Chinese: 權知開封府事)
- Hebei Lu zhuan yun fu shi (Chinese: 河北路轉運副使)
- Shaanxi Lu zhuan yun shi (Chinese: 陝西路轉運使)
- Hebei Lu zhuan yun shi (Chinese: 河北路轉運使)

== Family ==
- brother:Liu Chuo (Chinese: 劉綽)
- son:Liu Jianzhong (Chinese: 劉建中)
- son:Liu Zhengzhong (Chinese: 劉正中)
- brother:Liu Shen (Chinese: 劉紳)
- father:Liu Yan (Chinese: 劉延)
