= Gilbert of Meaux =

French bishop and saint

Saint Gilbert of Meaux
- Born: unknown Vermandois
- Died: 13 February 1015
- Venerated in: Eastern Orthodox Church; Roman Catholic Church
- Feast: 13 February

Gilbert of Meaux (died 13 February 1015), later known as Saint Gilbert of Meaux, was originally from Vermandois. He was the first canon in Saint-Quentin and then became bishop of Meaux.

Gilbert was the archdeacon of Bishop Archanrad, upon whose death he succeeded as bishop in 995. Little is known of his episcopal acts, but he subscribed to a charter for the abbey of Saint-Denis and gave donations to several other monasteries in the Ile de France. He appended his seal on a charter for the Abbey of St. Denis (998 and 1008), on a charter from King Robert in favor of the abbey of St. Peter of Melun (1005) and shared the property of the Church of Meaux between the bishop and his chapter. In 1008 he took part in the council of Chelles.

He died on Feb. 13, 1015. Several miracles were purported to have taken place at his tomb (he was buried in front of the high altar of Meaux Cathedral). His relics were profaned by the Huguenots in 1562. His feast is celebrated on February 13 in the dioceses of Soissons and Meaux.
