= Gundekar II of Eichstätt =

Bishop of Eichstatt

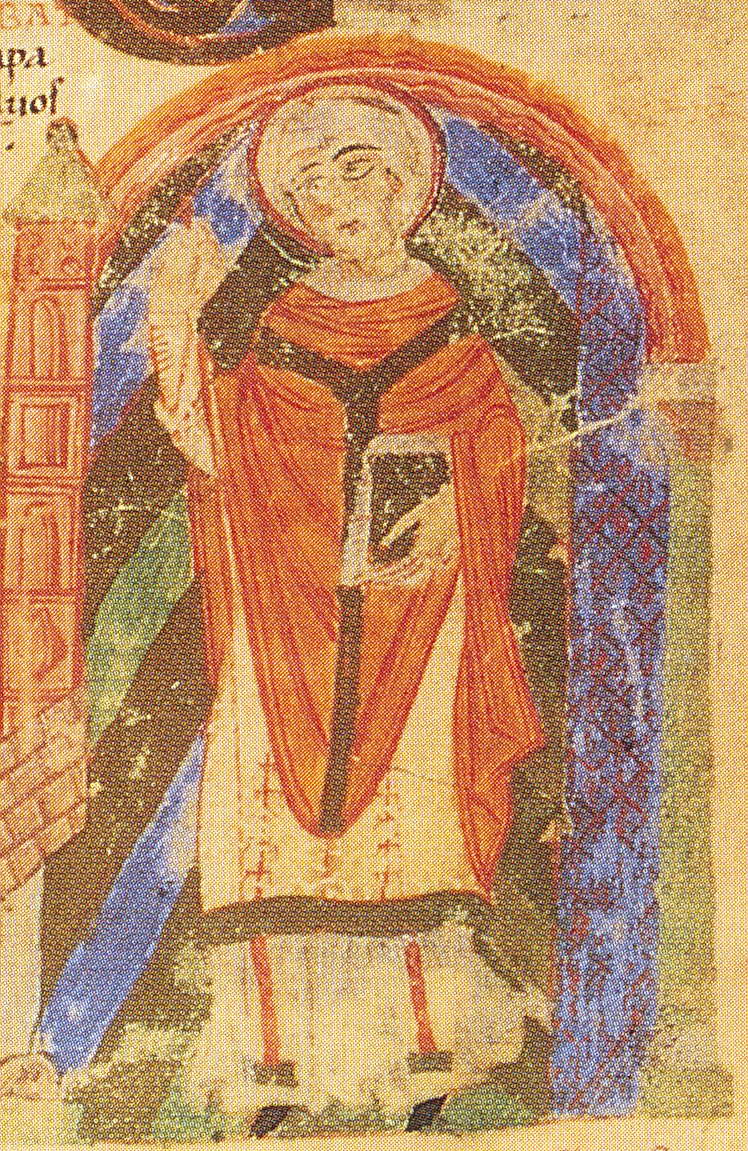
Gundekar II of Eichstätt

Gundekar (1019–1075), (also Gunzo) was bishop of Eichstätt from 1057 to 1075. He is known for his historical work Vitae Pontificum Eystettensium on his predecessors.

He is a Catholic blessed and his feast day is August 2.
