= 1094 =

1094 in various calendars
- Gregorian calendar: 1094; MXCIV
- Ab urbe condita: 1847
- Armenian calendar: 543; ԹՎ ՇԽԳ
- Assyrian calendar: 5844
- Balinese saka calendar: 1015–1016
- Bengali calendar: 500–501
- Berber calendar: 2044
- English Regnal year: 7 Will. 2 – 8 Will. 2
- Buddhist calendar: 1638
- Burmese calendar: 456
- Byzantine calendar: 6602–6603
- Chinese calendar: 癸酉年 (Water Rooster); 3791 or 3584 — to — 甲戌年 (Wood Dog); 3792 or 3585
- Coptic calendar: 810–811
- Discordian calendar: 2260
- Ethiopian calendar: 1086–1087
- Hebrew calendar: 4854–4855
- Hindu calendars
- Vikram Samvat: 1150–1151
- Shaka Samvat: 1015–1016
- Kali Yuga: 4194–4195
- Holocene calendar: 11094
- Igbo calendar: 94–95
- Iranian calendar: 472–473
- Islamic calendar: 486–487
- Japanese calendar: Kanji 8 / Kahō 1 (嘉保元年)
- Javanese calendar: 998–999
- Julian calendar: 1094; MXCIV
- Korean calendar: 3427
- Minguo calendar: 818 before ROC 民前818年
- Nanakshahi calendar: −374
- Seleucid era: 1405/1406 AG
- Thai solar calendar: 1636–1637
- Tibetan calendar: ཆུ་མོ་བྱ་ལོ་ (female Water-Bird); 1220 or 839 or 67 — to — ཤིང་ཕོ་ཁྱི་ལོ་ (male Wood-Dog); 1221 or 840 or 68

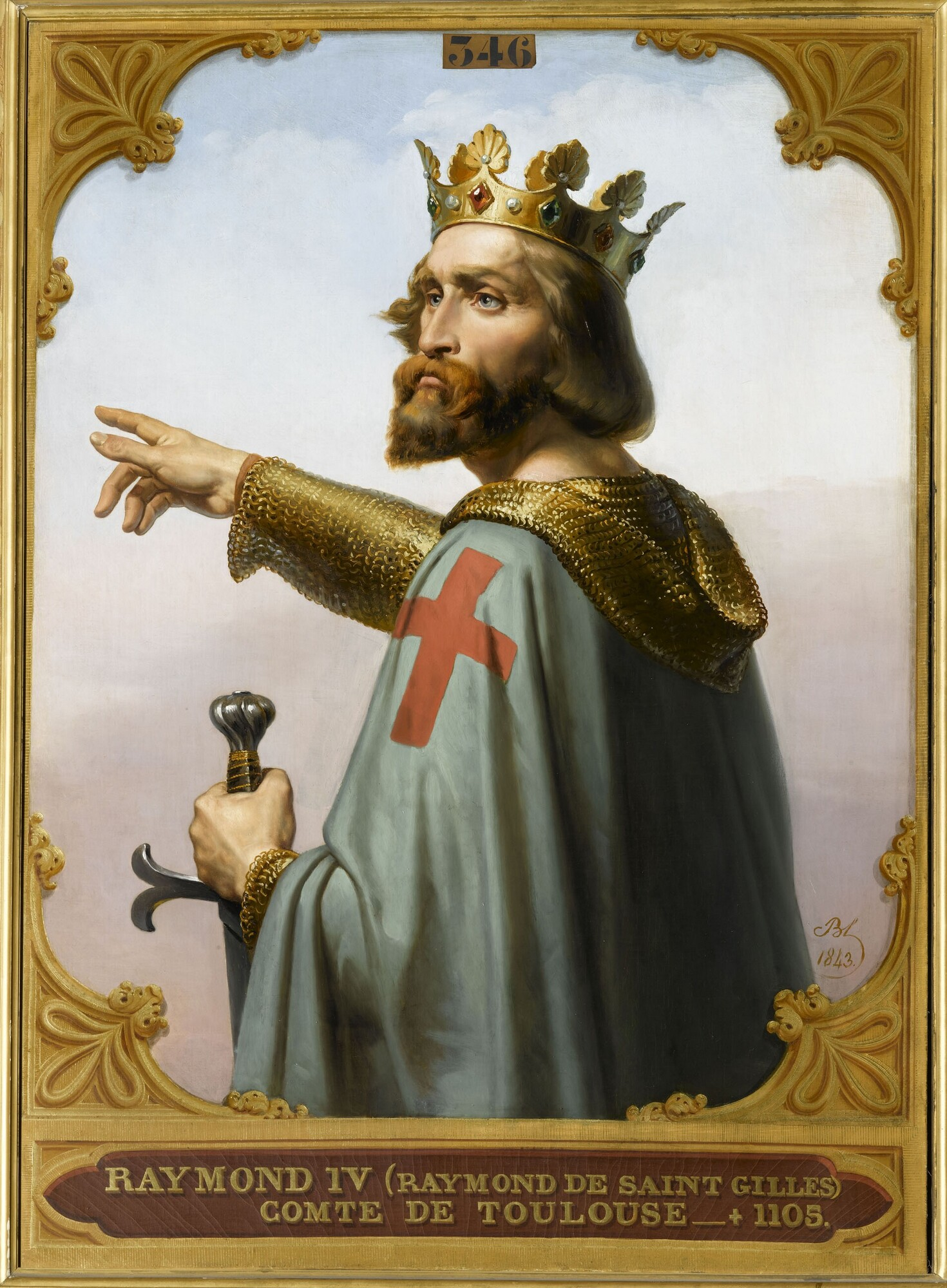
Portrait of Raymond IV of Toulouse from 1094

Year 1094 (MXCIV) was a common year starting on Sunday of the Julian calendar.

== Events ==
=== By place ===
==== Byzantine Empire ====
- Spring – Emperor Alexios I Komnenos sends a Byzantine expeditionary force under General Tatikios to Nicaea, in an attempt to re-capture the city from the Seljuk Turks. However, the arrival of Barkiyaruq's army en route stops the Byzantines. Alexios sends reinforcements; short of supplies, the Seljuk Turks retreat. Abu'l-Qasim, Seljuk governor of Nicaea, is defeated and forced to conclude a truce with Alexios.

==== Europe ====
- May – El Cid (Rodrigo Diaz de Vivar) completes his conquest of Valencia in Al-Andalus (modern Spain) and begins his rule (in the name of King Alfonso VI) there. The Almoravid campaign to regain the city fails.
- May–June – Duncan, son of the late King Malcolm III of Scotland, gathers a substantial army, chiefly Anglo-Normans from England, and challenges his uncle Donald III ("the Fair") for the Kingdom of Scotland. Duncan is crowned king at Scone.
- July 28 – William Bertrand dies, and his margravial title of Provence is inherited by Raymond IV ("Saint-Gilles"), who becomes count of Toulouse (until 1105).
- November 12 – Donald III mobilises his army and kills Duncan II in battle in the Scottish Lowlands, re-taking the Scottish throne.

==== Fatimid Egypt ====
- After the death of Caliph al-Mustansir Billah, his son-in-law and vizier Al-Afdal declares al-Musta'li, a younger son of al-Mustansir, in a coup d'état as new Caliph. Al-Mustansir's designated heir, Nizar, flees to Alexandria.

==== Eastern Islamic world ====
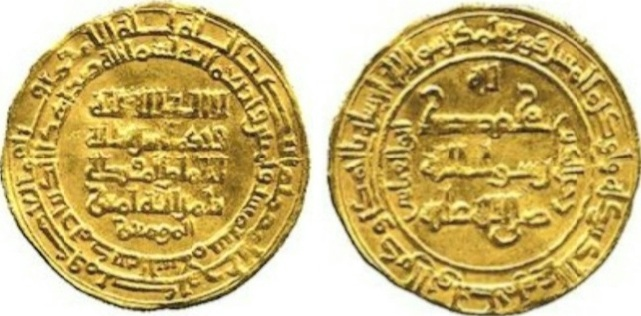
Gold dinar of al-Muqtadi mint at Baghdad

- February 3 – Caliph of Baghdad al-Muqtadi dies and is succeeded by his nominated heir Ahmad (al-Mustazhir).
- October – Seljuk sultan Mahmud I dies after a 2-year reign. He is succeeded by his brother Barkiyaruq (one of the Seljuk princes who claim the throne) as ruler of the Seljuk Empire.

=== By topic ===
==== Religion ====
- May 15 – The Cathedral of St. Agatha in Catania (Sicily) is consecrated by the Breton abbot Ansger.
- October 8 – Doge Vitale Faliero consecrates the new Basilica of San Marco in Venice.
- King Ladislaus I of Hungary founds a diocese (alongside the bishop's see) in Zagreb.
- Al-Musta'li becomes the nineteenth imam of Musta'li Ismailism

== Births ==
- January 14 – Eudokia Komnene, Byzantine princess (d. 1129)
- Abd al-Mu'min, Almohad caliph (approximate date)
- Ibn Zuhr (or Avenzoar), Moorish physician (d. 1162)
- Malachy, Irish archbishop and saint (d. 1148)
- Richard d'Avranches, 2nd Earl of Chester (d. 1120)
- Yelü Dashi, founder of the Qara Khitai (d. 1143)

== Deaths ==
- January 10 – Al-Mustansir Billah, Fatimid caliph (b. 1029)
- February 3
  - Al-Muqtadi, Abbasid caliph (b. 1056)
  - Teishi, Japanese empress (b. 1013)
- June 2 – Nicholas the Pilgrim, Italian shepherd (b. 1075)
- June 4 – Sancho V, king of Aragon and Pamplona
- July 28 – William Bertrand, margrave of Provence
- October 14
  - Bertha of Holland, French queen consort
  - Fujiwara no Nobunaga, Japanese nobleman (b. 1022)
- October – Mahmud I, sultan of the Seljuk Empire
- November 12 – Duncan II, king of Scotland
- Abu Ali Fana-Khusrau, Buyid nobleman
- Al-Bakri, Moorish historian and geographer
- Aq Sunqur al-Hajib, Seljuk sultan of Aleppo
- Badr al-Jamali, Fatimid vizier and statesman
- Isaac Albalia, Andalusian Jewish astronomer (b. 1035)
- Jonathan I, Italo-Norman count of Carinola
- Michael of Avranches, Italian bishop
- Roger de Beaumont, Norman nobleman
- Roger de Montgomery, Norman nobleman
- Terken Khatun, Seljuk empress and regent
- William Fitzeustace, 1st Earl of Gloucester, Norman nobleman
- Wulfnoth Godwinson, English nobleman
