= Wang Gui (Song dynasty) =

- Chinese: 王珪
Transcriptions
Standard Mandarin
- Hanyu Pinyin: Wáng Guī
- Wade–Giles: Wang^{2} Kuei^{1}

Wang Yuyu
- Chinese: 王禹玉
Transcriptions
Standard Mandarin
- Hanyu Pinyin: Wáng Yǔyù
- Wade–Giles: Wang^{2} Yü^{3}-Yü^{4}

Wang Gui (1019–1085), courtesy name Yuyu, was a high-ranking Song dynasty minister, serving as the chancellor for 16 years during Emperor Shenzong's and Emperor Zhezong's reigns. A timid opportunist without views, Wang accomplished virtually nothing in office.
