= House of Ponthieu =

Medieval noble dynasty of northern France

House of Ponthieu Maison de Ponthieu
- Noble house
- Attributed arms of the Counts of Ponthieu: Or, three bends azure, bordure gules
- Country: France
- Founded: 10th century
- Founder: Hugh I, Count of Ponthieu
- Final ruler: Eleanor of Castile
- Titles: Count of Ponthieu
- Cadet branches: House of Aumale

The House of Ponthieu was a Frankish noble dynasty that ruled the County of Ponthieu, a strategically important coastal territory in what is now the Somme, Hauts-de-France, from the late 10th century until its integration into the Crown of Castile–León in 1279 through dynastic marriage.

== History ==
=== Origins ===
The lineage began with Hugh I, considered the first Count of Ponthieu, active before the year 1000. He was succeeded by his son Enguerrand I.

=== Comital rule and growth ===
The counts of Ponthieu consolidated territory and established alliances with powerful neighbors:

- Enguerrand I appears in charters dated 1026–27 and legitimized ties through his son's marriage to Bertha of Aumale.
- Guy I (1053–1100) was involved in Norman and English politics and was noted for his captivity during William the Conqueror's campaigns.

Their power stemmed from dynastic marriages and relative stability, even as the Capetian monarchy consolidated power in northern France.

=== Decline and succession ===
After Guy I, the title passed to Agnes, who ruled jointly with her husband William III Talvas. Their son Guy II ruled until 1147. His successors were John I (1147–1191), William IV, Marie of Ponthieu, and finally Joan of Dammartin, who married Ferdinand III of Castile in 1237. Through this marriage, Ponthieu passed into the Crown of Castile in 1279, marking the end of the independent dynasty.

== Legacy ==
The House of Ponthieu developed a coastal principality that served as a crossroads between Normandy, Flanders, and Capetian France. Its members engaged in diplomacy, crusading, and marriage alliances. Under Joan of Dammartin, Ponthieu became part of a broader international network within Iberia.

== Notable members ==
- Hugh I, Count of Ponthieu
- Enguerrand I, Count of Ponthieu
- Hugh II, Count of Ponthieu
- Enguerrand II, Count of Ponthieu
- Guy I, Count of Ponthieu
- Agnes, Countess of Ponthieu
- Guy II, Count of Ponthieu
- John I, Count of Ponthieu
- William IV, Count of Ponthieu
- Marie of Ponthieu
- Joan of Dammartin
- Eleanor of Castile

== Sources ==
- Tanner, Heather J. (2004). Families, Friends and Allies: Boulogne and Politics in Northern France and England c. 879–1160. Leiden: Brill.
- Thompson, Kathleen (2022). “The Perspective from Ponthieu: Count Guy and his Norman Neighbour.” In Anglo-Norman Studies XLIV, Boydell Press.

== See also ==
- County of Ponthieu
- Counts of Ponthieu
- House of Normandy
- House of Flanders
