= Abbey of Saint-Riquier =

Carolingian-era Benedictine monastery in Saint-Riquier, Somme, France

Coordinates: 50.1341°N 1.9484°E

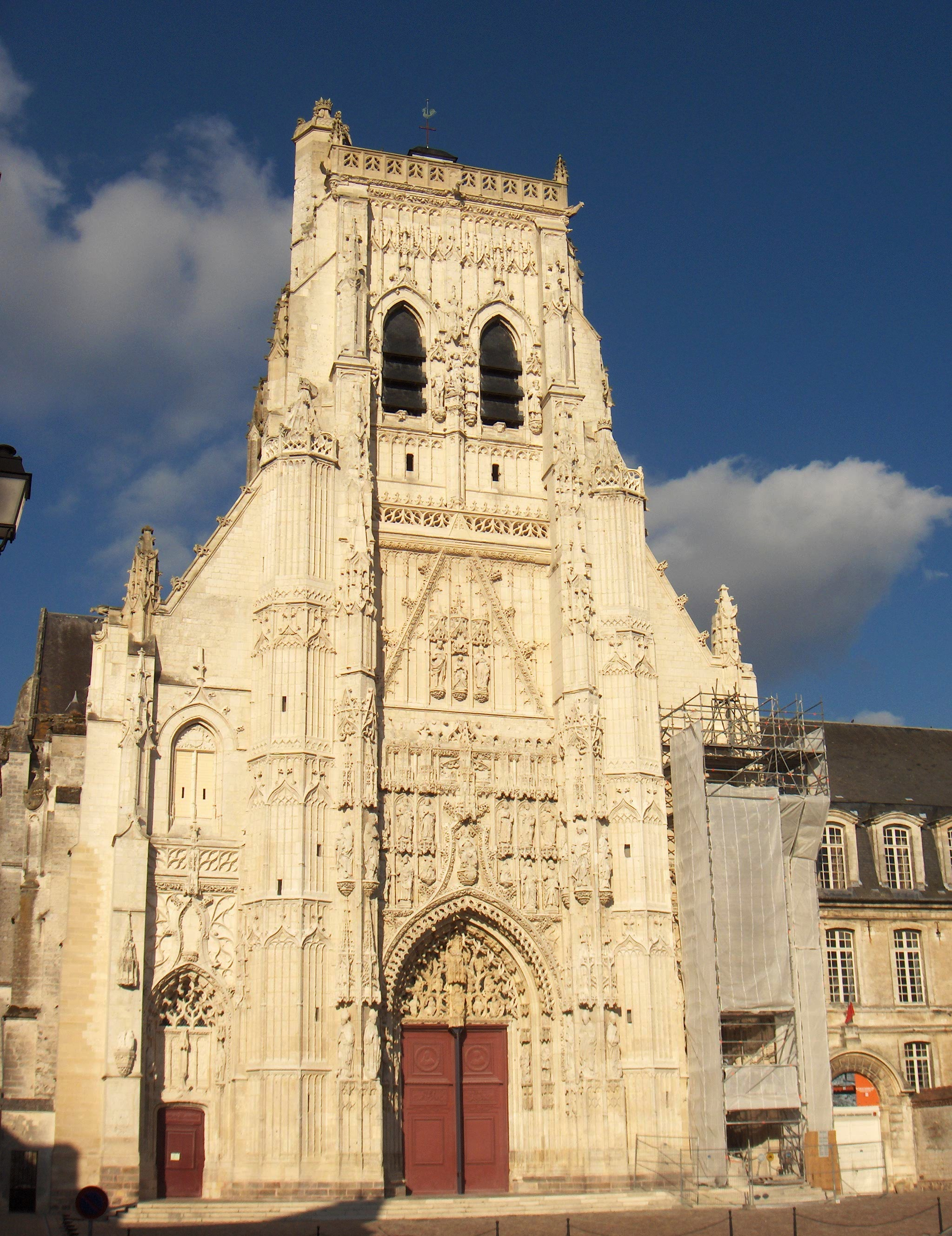
Abbey church

The abbey of Saint-Riquier was founded in 625 by Richarius (Riquier), son of the governor of the town of Centula (or Centulum), which lay within the kingdom of Austrasia. The foundation was enriched by King Dagobert I and prospered under the abbacy of Angilbert, son-in-law of Charlemagne, in the early 9th century. In 881, Vikings burned the abbey and destroyed much of the town.

The monastery was rebuilt in the Middle Ages on a smaller scale. The abbey was part of the diocese of Amiens in Ponthieu. The early counts of Ponthieu originally were styled advocatus of the abbey of Saint Riquier and castellan of Abbeville. The counts of Ponthieu enrolled their younger sons who were going into religious vocations at the abbey. Count Enguerrand I placed his sons, Fulk, later abbot of Forest-l'Abbaye, and Guy, later the bishop of Amiens, in Saint Riquier for their education. Their teacher was abbot Enguerrand the Wise (died 9 December 1045), under whose rule Saint Riquier enjoyed its "golden age." The abbey held estates in Norfolk, England.

The monk Hariulf wrote a history of the abbey down to 1096, the Chronicon Centulense. His work preserves information lost with the destruction of Saint-Riquier's archives in 1131.

Today's 18th-century buildings are occupied by an ecclesiastical seminary. The present church, built in the 13th and 14th centuries, is a magnificent example of Flamboyant Gothic architecture, and has a richly sculptured front on the west, surmounted by a square tower. In the interior the fine vaulting, the Renaissance font and carved stalls, and the frescoes in the treasury are especially noteworthy. Among other valuable relics, the treasury possesses a copper cross said to be the work of Saint Eloi (Eligius).

In 1536 Saint-Riquier repulsed an attack by the Germans, during its defense the women especially distinguishing themselves. In 1544 it was burned by the English, an event that marks the beginning of its decline. After 1538, it had only commendatory abbots. It was suppressed during the French Revolution in 1790.

== List of abbots ==
- Richer I (c. 640)
- Ocioald (c. 645)
- Coschin (c. 690)
- Guitmar/Widmar (fl. 762)
- Aldric (770s)
- Symphorian (780s)
- Angilbert (died 814)
- Heric (from 814?)
- Helisachar (830s)
- Richbod (died 844)
- Nithard (died 844), succeeded his father, probably as a lay abbot
- Louis (844–855)
- Rudolf (856), probably a lay abbot
- Welf (c. 864–868, 873), also abbot of Sainte-Colombe de Sens
- Carloman (c. 869–873)
- Herbert
- Hedenold
- Hugh
- Helgaud (before 926), lay abbot
- Gerbert the Clerk (930s)
- Gerard (948–952)
- Fulchericus (from 952)
- Ingelard (980? – 1007×1017)
- Angelran/Enguerrand (1007×1017 – 1045)
- Gervin I (1046?–1071)
- Gervin II (1071–1096)
- Anscher (1096? – late 1130s)
- John (late 1130s – 1143?)
- Gelduin (1143–1149)
- Peter I (1150–1164)
- Guifred (1164–1166)
- Richer II (1170–1177?)
- Lawrence (1177–1186?)
- Urse (1186–1194?)
- Richer II (1194?–1207)
- Gérold (1207–1210)
- Matthieu (1210–1211)
- Hugues II de Chevincourt (1211–1237)
- Gautier I (1237–1245)
- Hervé (1245–1248)
- Gautier II de Guessant (1248–1257)
- Gilles de Marchemont (1257–1292)
- Eudes (1292–1297)
- Eustache I (1297–1303)
- Jean II de Foucaucourt (1303–1312)
- Baudouin de Gaissart (1312–1343)
- Pierre II d'Allouenges (1343–1361)
- Philippe du Fossé (1361–1374)
- Hugues III de Roigny (1374–1393)
- Guichard de Salles (1393–1410)
- Jean III de Bouquetot (1410–1411)
- Hugues IV Caillerel (1411–1457)
- Pierre III Le Prêtre (1457–1479)
- Eustache II Le Quieux (1479–1511)
- Thibaud de Bayencourt (1511–1538)

== See also ==
- Saint-Riquier Gospels
