= Hugh I of Ponthieu =

Founding Count of Ponthieu in the late 10th century

Hugh I
- Count of Ponthieu
- Reign: 980s–before 1000
- Predecessor: None
- Successor: Enguerrand I
- Died: before 1000
- Noble family: House of Ponthieu
- Spouse: Gisèle of France (disputed)
- Issue: Enguerrand I, Count of Ponthieu

Hugh I of Ponthieu, who died c. 1000, was also known as Hugo Miles. However, some older genealogical works identify Hugh I as “Hugo Miles,” though no contemporary sources confirm this identification.

He was selected by Hugh Capet, Duke of France (not yet king), as the "advocate of the abbey of Saint-Riquier and castellan of Abbeville". Hugh also received Hugh Capet's daughter, Gisèle, in marriage.

Hugh's origins are unknown, and the date he received his fief is only ascertainable within broad limits as circa 980. Notably, he never styled himself as Count of Ponthieu.

== Family ==
Hugh married c. 994 Gisèle of France, daughter of Hugh Capet and Adelaide of Aquitaine. They had:

- Enguerrand I of Ponthieu was first to take the comital title
- Guy de Ponthieu, abbot of Foretmontiers

== Sources ==
- Tanner, Heather (2004). Families, Friends and Allies: Boulogne and Politics in Northern France and England, c.879-1160. Brill.
- The Carmen de Hastingae Proelio of Bishop Guy of Amiens, edited by Catherine Morton and Hope Muntz, Oxford at the Clarendon Press, 1972.

Preceded by none	Count of Ponthieu ? – c. 1000	Succeeded by Enguerrand I
