= Saint-Riquier =

- Commune
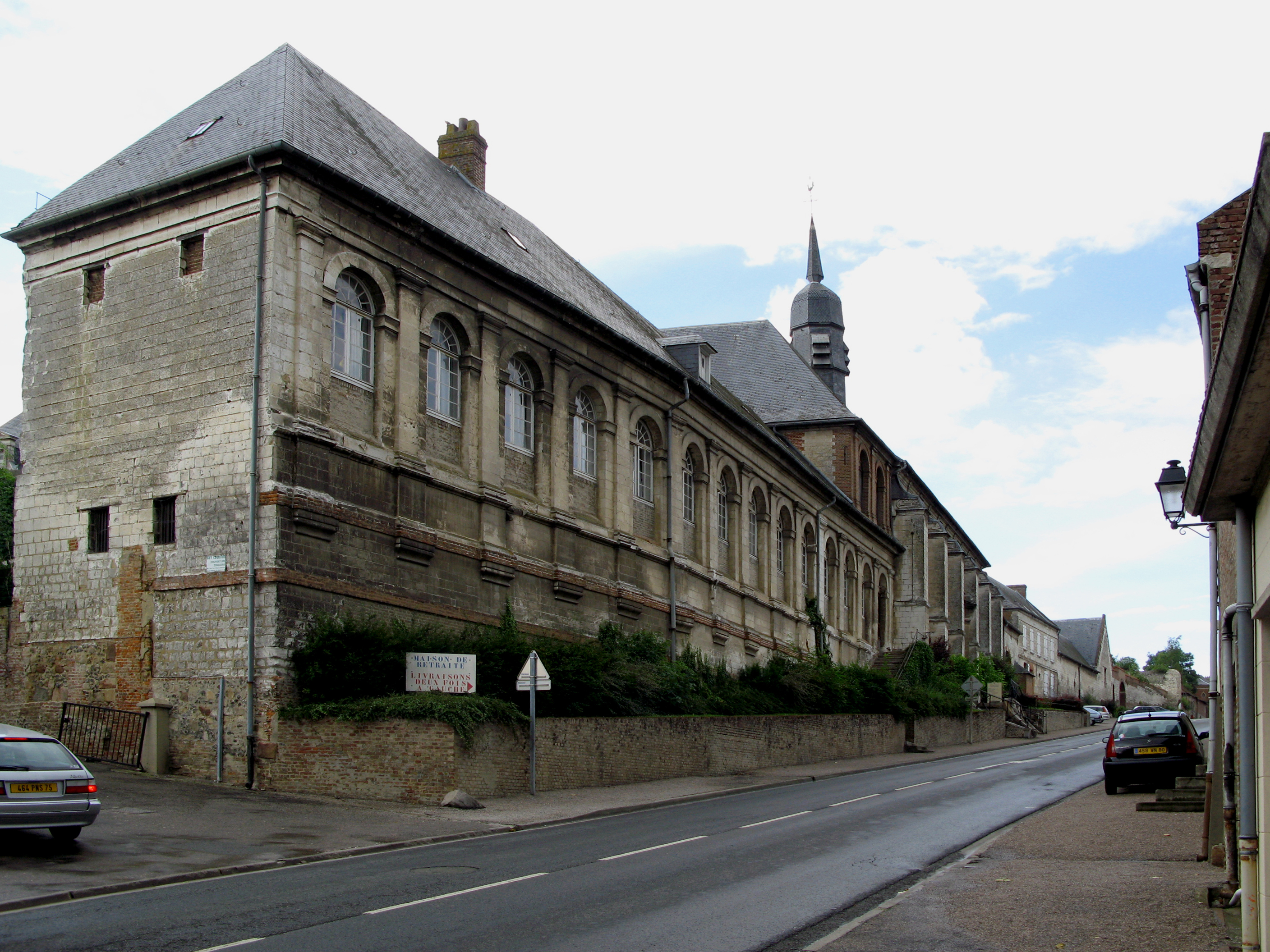
- Hôtel-Dieu

- Coat of arms
- Location of Saint-Riquier
- Location within France Location within Hauts-de-France
- Coordinates: 50°08′01″N 1°56′53″E
- Country: France
- Region: Hauts-de-France
- Department: Somme
- Arrondissement: Abbeville
- Canton: Rue
- Intercommunality: CC Ponthieu-Marquenterre

Government
  - Mayor (2021–2026): Yves Monin
- Area^{1}: 14.48 km^{2} (5.59 sq mi)
- Elevation: 22 m (72 ft)
- Highest elevation: 97 m (318 ft)
- Lowest elevation: 19 m (62 ft)
- Population (2023): 1,279
  - Density: 88.33/km^{2} (228.8/sq mi)
- Time zone: UTC+01:00 (CET)
  - Summer (DST): UTC+02:00 (CEST)
- INSEE/Postal code: 80716 /80135
- ^{1} French Land Register data, which excludes lakes, ponds, glaciers > 1 km^{2} (0.386 sq mi or 247 acres) and river estuaries.

Saint-Riquier (French pronunciation: [sɛ̃ ʁikje]; Picard: Saint-Ritchier) is a commune in the Somme department in Hauts-de-France in northern France.

== Geography ==
The commune is situated 6 kilometres (4 mi) northeast of Abbeville, on the D925 and D32 crossroads.

== Abbey ==
Saint-Riquier was originally known as Centula or Centulum. It gained fame for its abbey, founded about 625 by Richarius (Riquier), son of the governor of the town, which lay within the kingdom of Austrasia. The foundation was enriched by King Dagobert I and prospered under the abbacy of Angilbert, son-in-law of Charlemagne, in the early 9th century. In 881, Vikings burned the abbey and destroyed much of the town.

The monastery was rebuilt in the Middle Ages on a smaller scale. The abbey was part of the diocese of Amiens in Ponthieu. The early counts of Ponthieu originally were styled advocatus of the abbey of Saint Riquier and "castellan" of Abbeville. The counts of Ponthieu enrolled their younger sons who were going into religious vocations at the abbey. Count Enguerrand I placed his sons, Fulk, later abbot of Forest-l'Abbaye, and Guy, later the bishop of Amiens, in Saint Riquier for their education. Their teacher was abbot Enguerrand "the Wise" (d. 9 December 1045), under whose rule Saint Riquier enjoyed its "golden age." The abbey held estates in Norfolk, England.

Today's 18th century buildings are occupied by an ecclesiastical seminary. The present church, built in the 13th and 14th centuries, is a magnificent example of Flamboyant Gothic architecture, and has a richly sculptured front on the west, surmounted by a square tower. In the interior the fine vaulting, the Renaissance font and carved stalls, and the frescoes in the treasury are especially noteworthy. Among other valuable relics, the treasury possesses a copper cross said to be the work of Saint Eloi (Eligius).

In 1536 Saint-Riquier repulsed an attack by the Germans, during its defense the women especially distinguishing themselves. In 1544 it was burned by the English, an event that marks the beginning of its decline.

== Other sites ==
The bell-tower of Saint-Riquier was inscribed on the UNESCO World Heritage List in 2005 because of its architecture and testimony to the rise of municipal power in the area during the late Middle Ages, Renaissance, and Baroque periods.

== Population ==
Historical population
Year	Pop.	±% p.a.
1968	1,176	—
1975	1,205	+0.35%
1982	1,165	−0.48%
1990	1,166	+0.01%
1999	1,186	+0.19%
2007	1,254	+0.70%
2012	1,252	−0.03%
2017	1,258	+0.10%
2023	1,279	+0.28%
Source: INSEE

== Twin towns ==
- : Stutensee-Friedrichstal, Germany, since 1982.

== See also ==
- Communes of the Somme department
