= Joan of Ponthieu =

Queen of Castile and León from 1237 to 1252

Joan
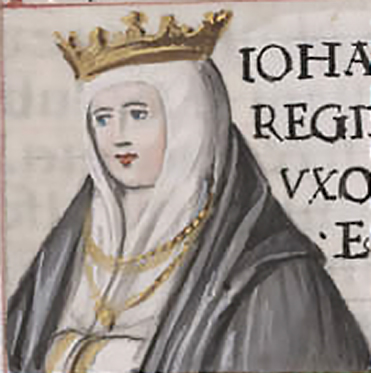

Queen consort of Castile and León
- Tenure: 1237–1252

Countess of Ponthieu
- Reign: 1251–1279
- Predecessor: Marie
- Successor: Eleanor

Countess of Aumale
- Reign: 1239–1279
- Predecessor: Simon
- Successor: John I
- Born: 1220
- Died: 16 March 1279 (aged 58–59); Abbeville, France
- Spouse: Ferdinand III of Castile; Jean de Nesle, Seigneur de Falvy et de La Hérelle
- Issue Detail: Ferdinand II, Count of Aumale; Eleanor, Queen of England
- House: Dammartin
- Father: Simon of Dammartin
- Mother: Marie, Countess of Ponthieu

Joan of Dammartin (French: Jeanne; c. 1220 – 16 March 1279) was Queen of Castile and León by marriage to Ferdinand III of Castile. She also ruled as Countess of Ponthieu (1251–1279) and Aumale (1237–1279). Her daughter, the English queen Eleanor of Castile, was her successor in Ponthieu. Ferdinand II, Count of Aumale, her son and co-ruler in Aumale, predeceased her, thus she was succeeded by her grandson John I, Count of Aumale.

== Family ==
Joan was born c. 1220. She was the eldest daughter of Simon of Dammartin, Count of Ponthieu (1180- 21 September 1239), and his wife Marie of Ponthieu, Countess of Montreuil (17 April 1199 – 1251). Her paternal grandparents were Alberic III, Count of Dammartin, and Mahaut de Clermont, daughter of Renaud de Clermont, Count of Clermont-en-Beauvaisis, and Clémence de Bar. Her maternal grandparents were William IV of Ponthieu and Alys, Countess of the Vexin, daughter of Louis VII of France and Constance of Castile.

== Marriage negotiations ==
After secret negotiations were undertaken in 1234, it was agreed that Joan would marry King Henry III of England. This marriage would have been politically unacceptable to the French, however, since Joan stood to inherit not only her mother's county of Ponthieu, but also the county of Aumale that was vested in her father's family. Ponthieu bordered on the duchy of Normandy, and Aumale lay within Normandy itself. The French king Philip Augustus had seized Normandy from King John of England as recently as 1205, and Philip's heirs could not risk the English monarchy recovering any land in that area, since it might allow the Plantagenets to re-establish control in Normandy.

As it happened, Joan's father Simon had become involved in a conspiracy of northern French noblemen against Philip Augustus and to win pardon from Philip's son King Louis VIII, Simon—who had only daughters—was compelled to promise that he would marry off neither of his two eldest daughters without the permission of the king of France. In 1235, Queen Blanche invoked that promise on behalf of her minor son, King Louis IX, and threatened to deprive Simon of all his lands if Joan married Henry III. Blanche also petitioned the pope to forbid the marriage on the account of consanguinity. He agreed, denying the dispensation which Henry had sought and paid for. Henry therefore abandoned the project for his marriage to Joan and in January 1236 married instead Louis IX's sister-in-law Eleanor of Provence.

== Queen of Castile ==
Coat of arms of Joan as Queen of Castile

In November 1235, Blanche of Castile's nephew, King Ferdinand III of Castile, lost his wife, Elisabeth of Hohenstaufen, and Blanche's sister Berengaria of Castile, Ferdinand's mother, was concerned that her widowed son might involve himself in liaisons that were unsuited to his dignity as king. Berengaria determined to find Ferdinand another wife, and her sister Blanche suggested Joan of Dammartin, whose marriage to the king of Castile would keep her inheritance from falling into hostile hands. In October 1237, at the age of about seventeen, Joan and Ferdinand were married in Burgos. Since Ferdinand already had seven sons from his first marriage to Elisabeth of Hohenstaufen, there was little chance of Ponthieu being absorbed by Castile.

They had four sons and one daughter:

1. Ferdinand II, Count of Aumale (1239 – ca 1265), who married Laure de Montfort, Lady of Espernon, daughter of Amaury VI of Montfort, sometime after 1256 and had issue.
2. Eleanor (1241–1290), Countess of Ponthieu, who married king Edward I of England and had issue.
3. Louis (1243 – ca 1275), who married Juana de Manzanedo, Lady of Gaton, and had issue.
4. Simon (1244), died young and buried in a monastery in Toledo.
5. John (1246), died young and buried at the cathedral in Córdoba.

She accompanied Ferdinand to Andalucia and lived with him in the army camp as he besieged Seville in 1248.

Upon her mother's death in 1251, Joan succeeded as Countess of Ponthieu and Montreuil, which she held in her own right.

After Ferdinand III died in 1252, Joan did not enjoy a cordial relationship with his heir, her stepson Alfonso X of Castile, with whom she quarreled over the lands and income she should have received as dowager queen of Castile. Sometime in 1253, she became the ally and supporter of another of her stepsons, Henry of Castile, who also felt Alfonso had not allowed him all the wealth their father had meant him to have. Joan unwisely attended secret meetings with Henry and his supporters, and it was rumored that she and Henry were lovers. This further strained her relations with Alfonso and in 1254, shortly before her daughter Eleanor was to marry Edward of England, Joan and her eldest son Ferdinand left Castile and returned to her native Ponthieu.

== Rule in Ponthieu and Aumale ==
Sometime between May 1260 and 9 February 1261, Joan took a second husband, Jean de Nesle, Seigneur de Falvy et de La Hérelle (died 2 February 1292). This marriage is sometimes said to have produced a daughter, Béatrice, but she was in fact a child of Jean de Nesle's first marriage. In 1263, Joan was recognized as countess of Aumale after the death of a childless Dammartin cousin. But her son Ferdinand died around 1265, leaving a young son known as John of Ponthieu.

During her marriage to Jean de Nesle, Joan ran up considerable debts and also appears to have allowed her rights as countess in Ponthieu to weaken. The death of her son Ferdinand in 1265 made her next son, Louis, her heir in Ponthieu but around 1275 he, too, died, leaving two children. But according to inheritance customs in Picardy, where Ponthieu lay, Joan's young grandson John of Ponthieu could not succeed her there; her heir in Ponthieu automatically became her adult daughter Eleanor, who was married to Edward I of England. It does not appear that Joan was displeased at the prospect of having Ponthieu pass under English domination; from 1274 to 1278, in fact, she had her granddaughter Joan of Acre (the daughter of Edward I and Eleanor) with her in Ponthieu, and appears to have treated the girl so indulgently that when she was returned to England her parents found that she was thoroughly spoiled.

That same indulgent nature appears to have made Joan inattentive to her duties as countess. When she died at Abbeville, in March 1279, her daughter and son-in-law were thus confronted with Joan's vast debts, and to prevent the king of France from involving himself in the county's affairs, they had to pay the debts quickly by taking out loans from citizens in Ponthieu and from wealthy abbeys in France.

They also had to deal with a lengthy legal struggle with Eleanor's nephew, John of Ponthieu, to whom Joan bequeathed a great deal of land in Ponthieu as well as important legal rights connected with those estates. The dispute was resolved when John of Ponthieu was recognized as Joan's successor in Aumale according to the inheritance customs that prevailed in Normandy, while Edward and Eleanor retained Ponthieu and John gave up all his claims there. By using English wealth, Edward and Eleanor restored stability to the administration and the finances of Ponthieu, and added considerably to the comital estate by purchasing large amounts of land there.

== Sources ==
- Johnstone, Hilda (1914). "The County of Ponthieu, 1279-1307". The English Historical Review. 29 (115). Oxford University Press.
- Parsons, John Carmi (1984). Brown, Virginia (ed.). "The Year of Eleanor of Castile's Birth and Her Children by Edward I". Mediaeval Studies. XLVI. Pontifical Institute of Mediaeval Studies: 245-265. doi:10.1484/J.MS.2.306316.
- Parsons, John Carmi (1995). Eleanor of Castile, Queen and Society in Thirteenth-Century England. Palgrave Macmillan.
- Prestwich, Michael (1988). Edward I. University of California Press.
- Richardson, Douglas (2011). Everingham, Kimball G. (ed.). Plantagenet Ancestry: A Study in Colonial and Medieval Families.

Joan of Ponthieu House of Dammartin Born: 1220 Died: 16 March 1279
Royal titles
Preceded by Elisabeth of Hohenstaufen	Queen consort of Castile and León; 1237–1252	Succeeded by Violant of Aragon
French nobility
Preceded by Simon	Countess of Aumale; 1239–1279 with Ferdinand I (1239–1252); Ferdinand II (1252–1260); John I (1260–1279)	Succeeded by John I
Preceded by Marie	Countess of Ponthieu; 1251–1279 with Ferdinand (1251–1252)	Succeeded by Eleanor; Edward I
