= Richarius =

French hermit and monk (560–645)

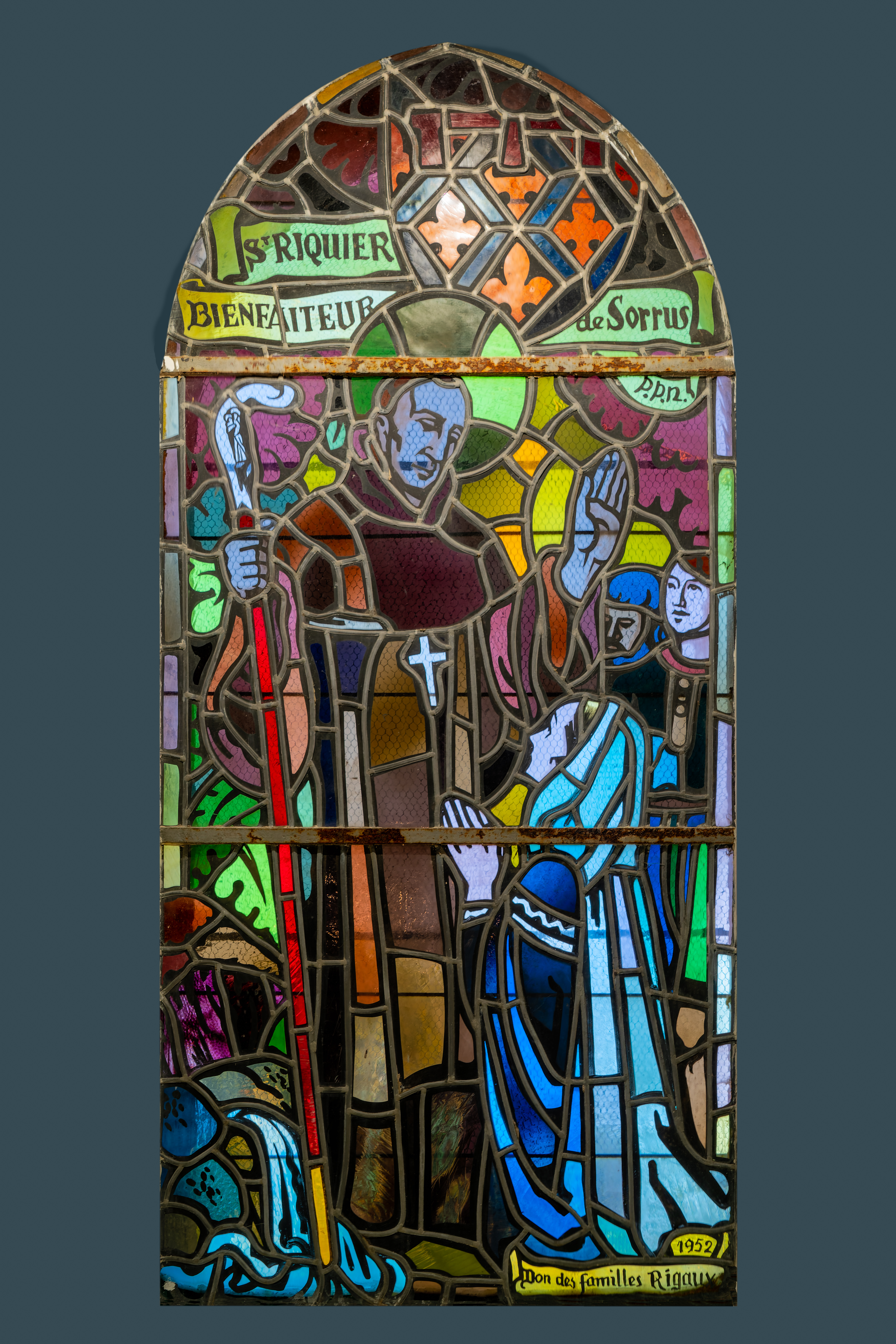
- Modern stained-glass image of Ricarius in Saint-Riquier Church, Sorrus, Pas-de-Calais

Monastic founder and hermit
- Born: c. 560; Ponthieu, Francia
- Died: April 26, 645 (aged 84–85); Crécy, Frankish Kingdom
- Venerated in: Catholic Church; Eastern Orthodox Church
- Feast: April 26

Richarius of Celles (French: Riquier de Centule; Picard: Ritchier; c. 560 – April 26, 645) was a Frankish hermit, monk, and the founder of two monasteries. He is venerated as a saint in the Catholic and Eastern Orthodox Churches.

== Life ==
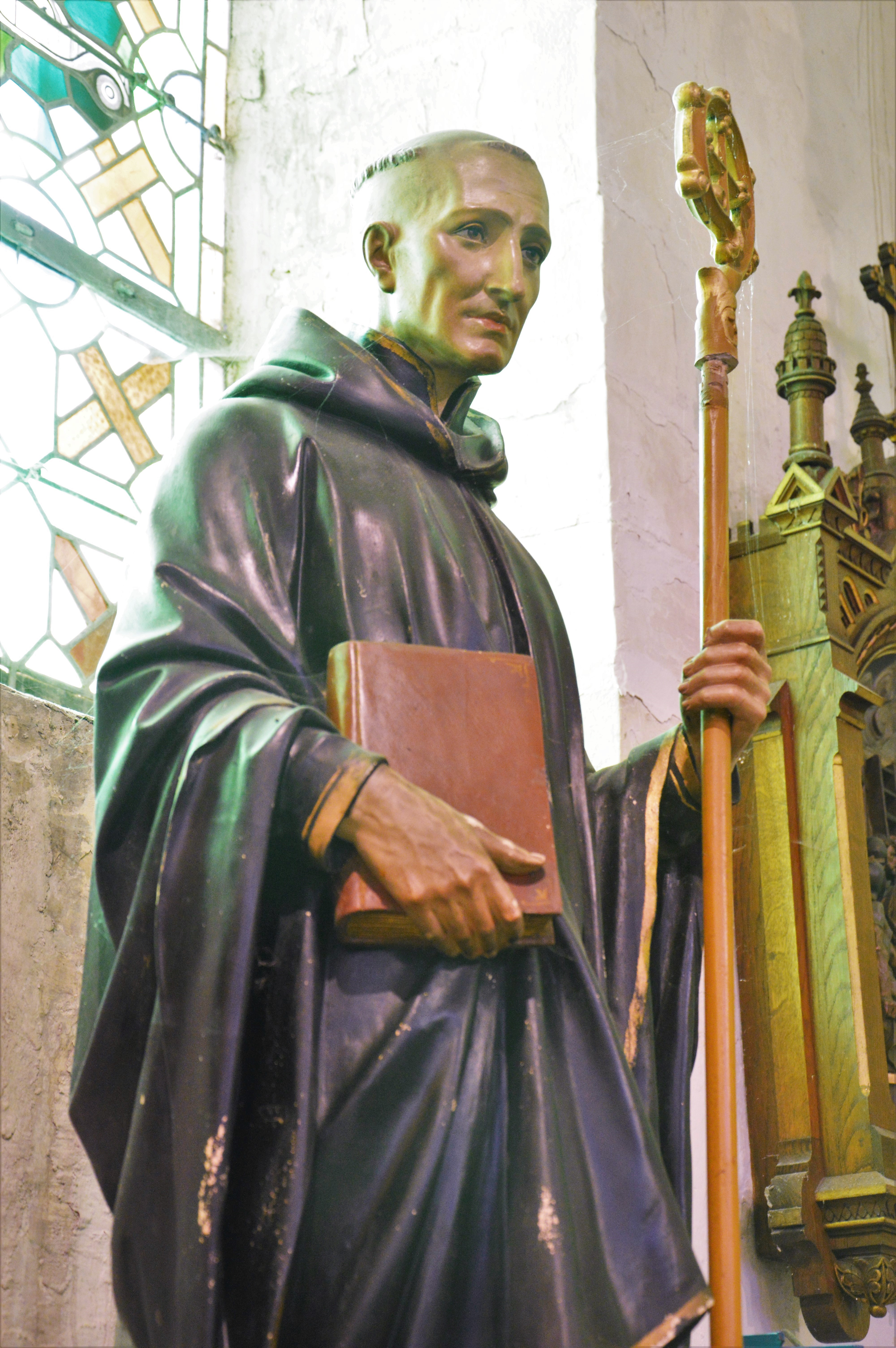
Statue of St. Richarius in Church of St. Omer in Houchin, oft-invoked for protection of children

Riquier's vita was probably written at the end of the 7th century. Shortly after 800 it was revised by Alcuin at the request of Abbot Angilibert, who dedicated his work to Charlemagne.

Richarius was born a pagan in the late 6th century in the county of Ponthieu near Amiens in Picardy in the north of Francia. According to the vita written by Alcuin, Richarius gave shelter to two Welsh missionaries, Caidocus and Frechorius, who were treated with great hostility by the local people who blamed the strangers for crop failure. Because he "welcomed God in the persons of the travelers ... this was why he was granted God's mercy." Richarius converted to Christianity under their influence. After his conversion, he fasted on barley bread mixed with ashes, and drank only water. He was ordained a priest, and traveled to England, preaching the Gospel and curing the sick. Travelling by donkey rather than horse, he read the psalter as he rode.

In 638, after some years in England, Richarius founded a monastery in his hometown in Ponthieu that was named Centule (or Centula, alteration of Latin Centum Turres: hundred towers). This monastery practised according to the Rule of Saint Columbanus of Luxeuil. A city developed around this monastery, also named Centule. In the Middle Ages it was renamed to Saint-Riquier. Nowadays it has some 1200 inhabitants, who still refer to themselves as Centulois. The Frankish king Dagobert I once came to visit the monastery, and Richarius offered the king advice. He was frank and clear in his speech to the king, speaking without fear or flattery, and the king thereafter became a benefactor of the monastery. Others also gave generously to Richarius's monastery, and he was able to use the money to help lepers and the poor and to ransom prisoners held by England.

Richarius eventually founded a second monastery called Forest-Montier. He made a shelter in the forest of Crécy, fifteen miles from his monastery. He lived there as a hermit with his disciple Sigobart. On April 26, 643, he bid farewell to Sigobart and died.

== Veneration ==
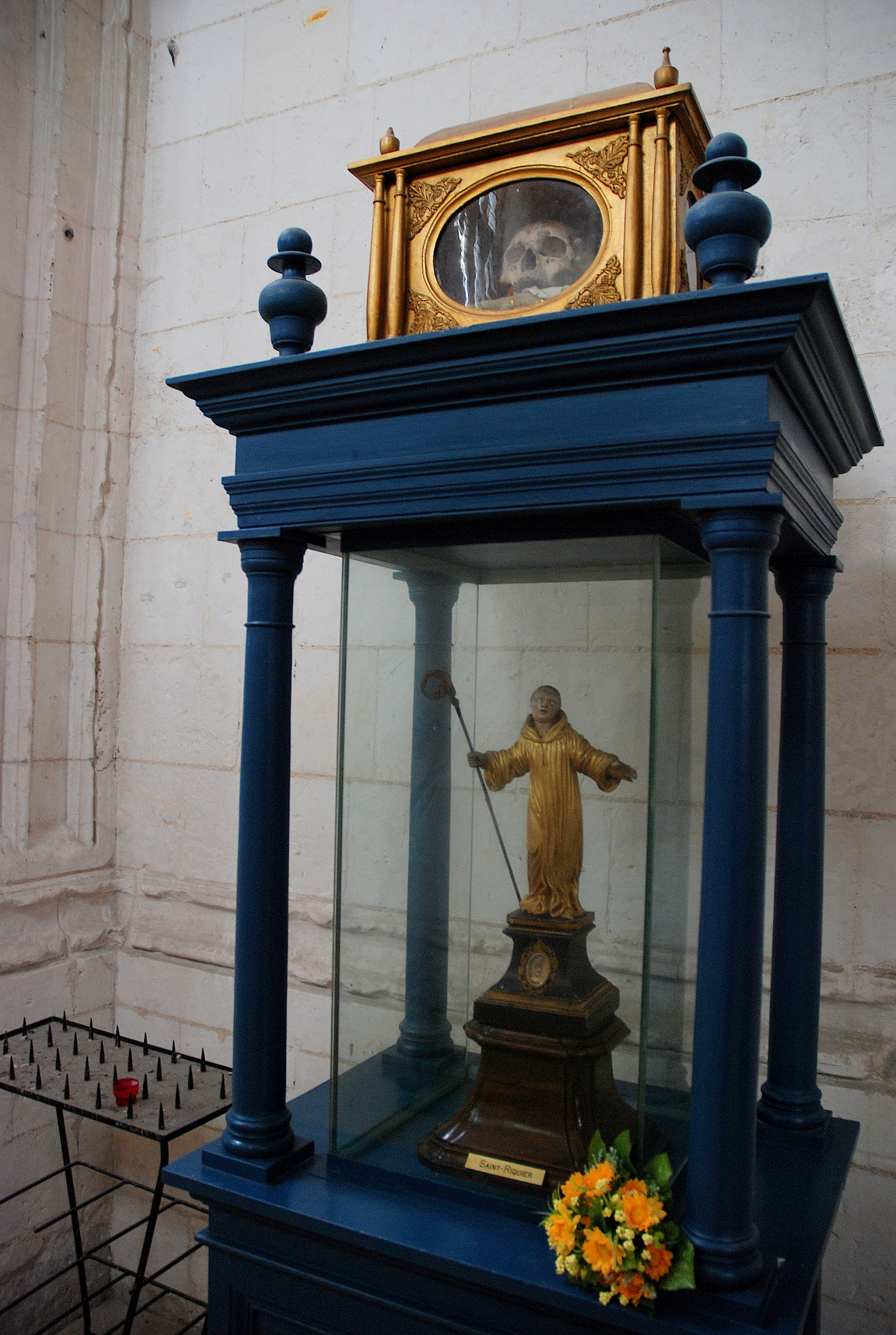
Relics of Saint Richarius, kept in the abbey church of St. Riquier

In monastério Céntula, in Gállia, sancti Richárii, Presbyteri et Confessóris.
In the monastery of Centula in France, St. Richarius, priest and confessor.

— From the Roman Martyrology

His relics were first put in a coffin made of an oak trunk and then translated to the abbey of Centula. One hundred and fifty years later, Charlemagne built a golden shrine to enclose the relics and had the Saint-Riquier Gospels made for the shrine. In 950 Count Arnulf I of Flanders transferred the bones to Montreuil, then to the Abbey of Saint Bertin in today's St-Omer; in 980 Hugo Capet returned them to St-Riquier. Above the tomb of Riquier, an abbey was built, which was later named after him, as was the city.

Aside from Saint-Riquier, the villages of Saint-Riquier-en-Rivière and Saint-Riquier-ès-Plains in Normandy bear his name.

Medieval monks compiled a catalogue of flowers for each day in the year, and dedicated each flower to a particular Saint, on account of it flowering about the time of the Saint's feast day. The flower Erysimum barbarea (yellow rocket or wintercress) is associated with Richarius, whose feast day in the Roman Catholic Church is April 26. A feast for the translation of his relics is celebrated on October 9.
