= Simon of Dammartin =

Simon of Dammartin, Count of Ponthieu and Aumale
- Born: 1180
- Died: September 21, 1239 (aged 58–59)
- Noble family: Dammartin
- Spouse: Marie, Countess of Ponthieu
- Issue: Joan of Dammartin; Mathilda of Dammartin; Philippe of Dammartin; Maria of Dammartin
- Father: Alberic III of Dammartin
- Mother: Mathildis of Clermont

Simon of Dammartin (1180 – 21 September 1239) was count of Ponthieu. In 1214 he fought against Philip Augustus at the battle of Bouvines. With the Capetian victory at Bouvines, he was exiled. Through negotiations of his wife Marie, he was allowed back in Ponthieu and agreed to not allow his daughters to marry without royal consent.

== Biography ==
Simon was son of Alberic III of Dammartin (Aubry de Dammartin) and his wife Mathildis of Clermont, heiress to the county of Clermont and daughter of Renaud II, Count of Clermont. His brother, Renaud I of Dammartin, had abducted the heiress of Boulogne, and forced her to marry him. In 1206, King Philip Augustus gave him the castle of St. John. In order to strengthen the alliance with the Dammartins, King Philip Augustus of France allowed Simon to marry Marie of Ponthieu, daughter of William IV, Count of Ponthieu, in 1208. Renaud and Simon of Dammartin would eventually ally themselves with John, King of England. In 1214 the brothers stood against Philip Augustus in the Battle of Bouvines. The French won the battle, and Renaud was imprisoned, while Simon was exiled.

Simon's father-in-law, William IV, Count of Ponthieu had remained loyal to Philip Augustus. When William died in 1221, Philip Augustus denied Simon's wife's inheritance and gave Ponthieu in custody to his cousin Robert III, Count of Dreux. Following Philip Augustus's death in 1225, Marie managed to broker a deal with his heir Louis VIII. Simon could not enter this fief or any other without royal permission, as Ponthieu was held by the king. Simon accepted the terms in 1231 and added that he would not negotiate his daughters' marriages without the king's approval.

== Family ==
Simon married Marie of Ponthieu, the daughter of William IV of Ponthieu and Alys, Countess of the Vexin. Marie became Countess of Ponthieu in 1225.

Simon and Marie had:

- Joan, Countess of Ponthieu (1220–1278), married:
  - 1) Ferdinand III of Castile. Mother of Eleanor of Castile, the wife of Edward I of England.
  - 2) Jean de Nesle, Seigneur de Falvy et de La Hérelle.
- Mathilda of Dammartin (-1279), married John of Châtellerault
- Philippe of Dammartin (-1280), married:
  - 1) Raoul II of Lusignan,
  - 2) Raoul II, Lord of Coucy,
  - 3) Otto II of Guelders.
- Maria of Dammartin, married John II, Count of Roucy

== Sources ==
- Baldwin, John W. (2000). Aristocratic Life in Medieval France: The Romances of Jean Renart and Gerbert de Montreuil, 1190-1230. Johns Hopkins University Press.
- Grant, Lindy (2005). Architecture and society in Normandy 1120-1270. Yale University Press.
- Johnstone, Hilda (1914). "The County of Ponthieu, 1279-1307". The English Historical Review. 29 (115 July). Oxford University Press.
- Krause, Kathy M. (2019). "From Mothers to Daughters: Literary Patronage as Political Work in Ponthieu". In Tanner, Heather J. (ed.). Medieval Elite Women and the Exercise of Power, 1100--1400: Moving Beyond the Exceptionalist Debate. Palgrave Macmillan.
- Pollock, M. A. (2015). Scotland, England and France After the Loss of Normandy, 1204-1296: "Auld Amitie". The Boydell Press.
- Power, Daniel (2007). The Norman Frontier in the Twelfth and Early Thirteenth Centuries. Cambridge University Press.
- Rosenberg, Samuel N.; Pippenger, Randall T., eds. (2022). Tales of a Minstrel of Reims in the Thirteenth Century. The Catholic University of America Press.
