= Beaurainville =

Beaurainville Belrem
- Commune
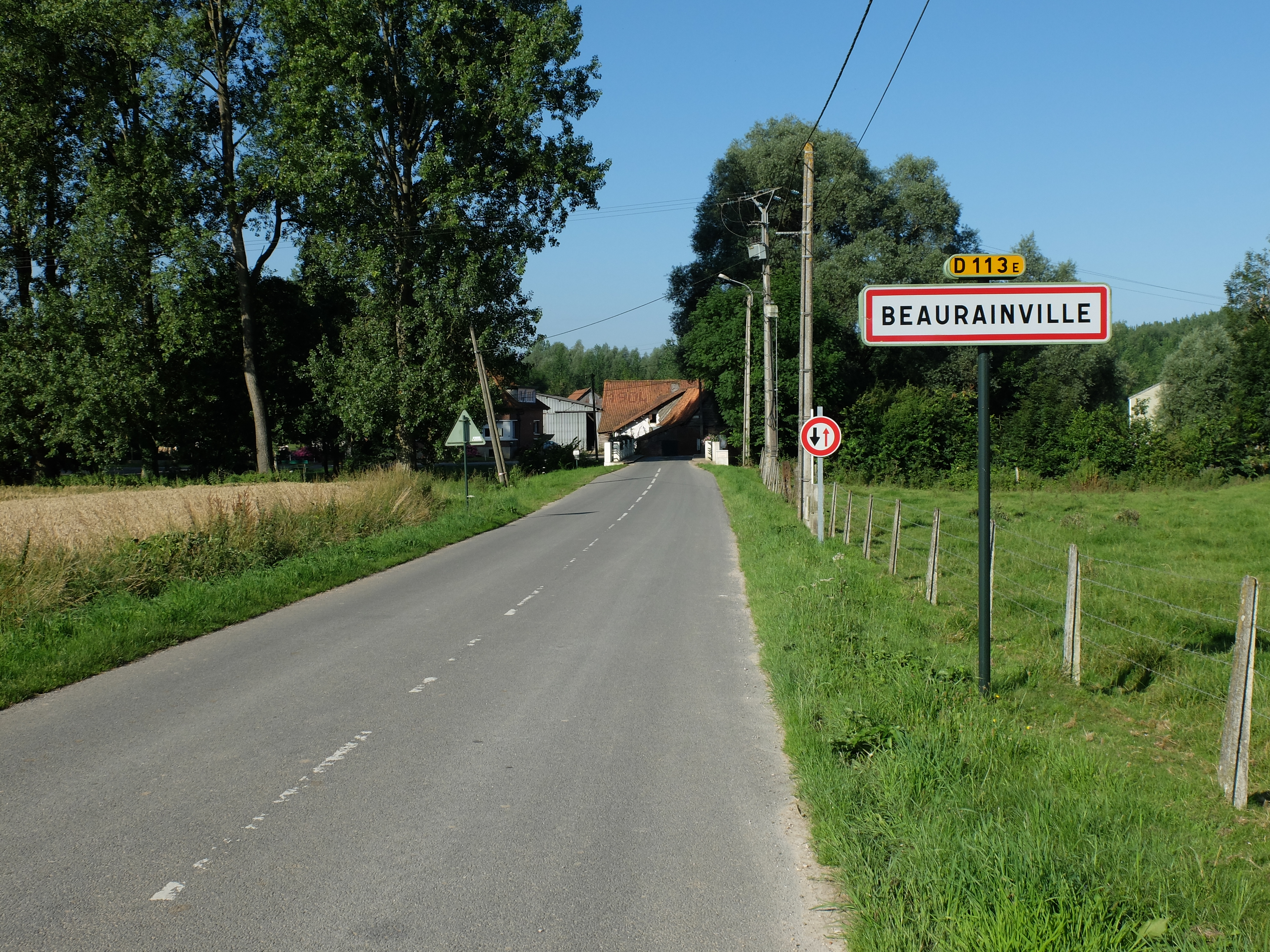
- The road into Beaurainville

- Coat of arms
- Location of Beaurainville
- Location within France Location within Hauts-de-France
- Coordinates: 50°25′32″N 1°53′56″E
- Country: France
- Region: Hauts-de-France
- Department: Pas-de-Calais
- Arrondissement: Montreuil
- Canton: Auxi-le-Château
- Intercommunality: CC des 7 Vallées

Government
  - Mayor (2020–2026): Jeannie Sergent
- Area^{1}: 13.09 km^{2} (5.05 sq mi)
- Elevation: 16 m (52 ft)
- Highest elevation: 102 m (335 ft)
- Lowest elevation: 9 m (30 ft)
- Population (2023): 2,014
  - Density: 153.9/km^{2} (398.5/sq mi)
- Time zone: UTC+01:00 (CET)
  - Summer (DST): UTC+02:00 (CEST)
- INSEE/Postal code: 62100 /62990
- ^{1} French Land Register data, which excludes lakes, ponds, glaciers > 1 km^{2} (0.386 sq mi or 247 acres) and river estuaries.

Beaurainville (French pronunciation: [boʁɛ̃vil]; West Flemish: Belrem) is a commune in the Pas-de-Calais department in the Hauts-de-France region in northern France.

== Geography ==
Beaurainville is a small town situated some 6 miles (10 km) southeast of Montreuil-sur-Mer, on the D130 road and on the banks of the river Canche.

== History ==
In 1064, two years before the Battle of Hastings, Harold Godwinson, then Earl of Wessex, was shipwrecked on the shores of Ponthieu and captured by Guy I, Count of Ponthieu (d.1100) who took him to his castle of Beaurain, situated 24.5 km (15.2 mi) up the River Canche from the English Channel coast, (now Le Touquet), as the Bayeux Tapestry relates: HIC APPREHENDIT WIDO HAROLDUM ET DUXIT EUM AD BELREM ET IBI EUM TENUIT ("Here Guy seized Harold and led him to Beaurain and held him there"). Duke William of Normandy demanded the release of the earl, and Count Guy delivered Harold Godwinson up after being paid a ransom for him.

== Population ==
Historical population
Year	Pop.	±% p.a.
1968	1,566	—
1975	1,909	+2.87%
1982	1,976	+0.49%
1990	2,093	+0.72%
1999	1,994	−0.54%
2007	1,931	−0.40%
2012	1,980	+0.50%
2017	2,095	+1.14%
2023	2,014	−0.66%
Source: INSEE

== Views ==
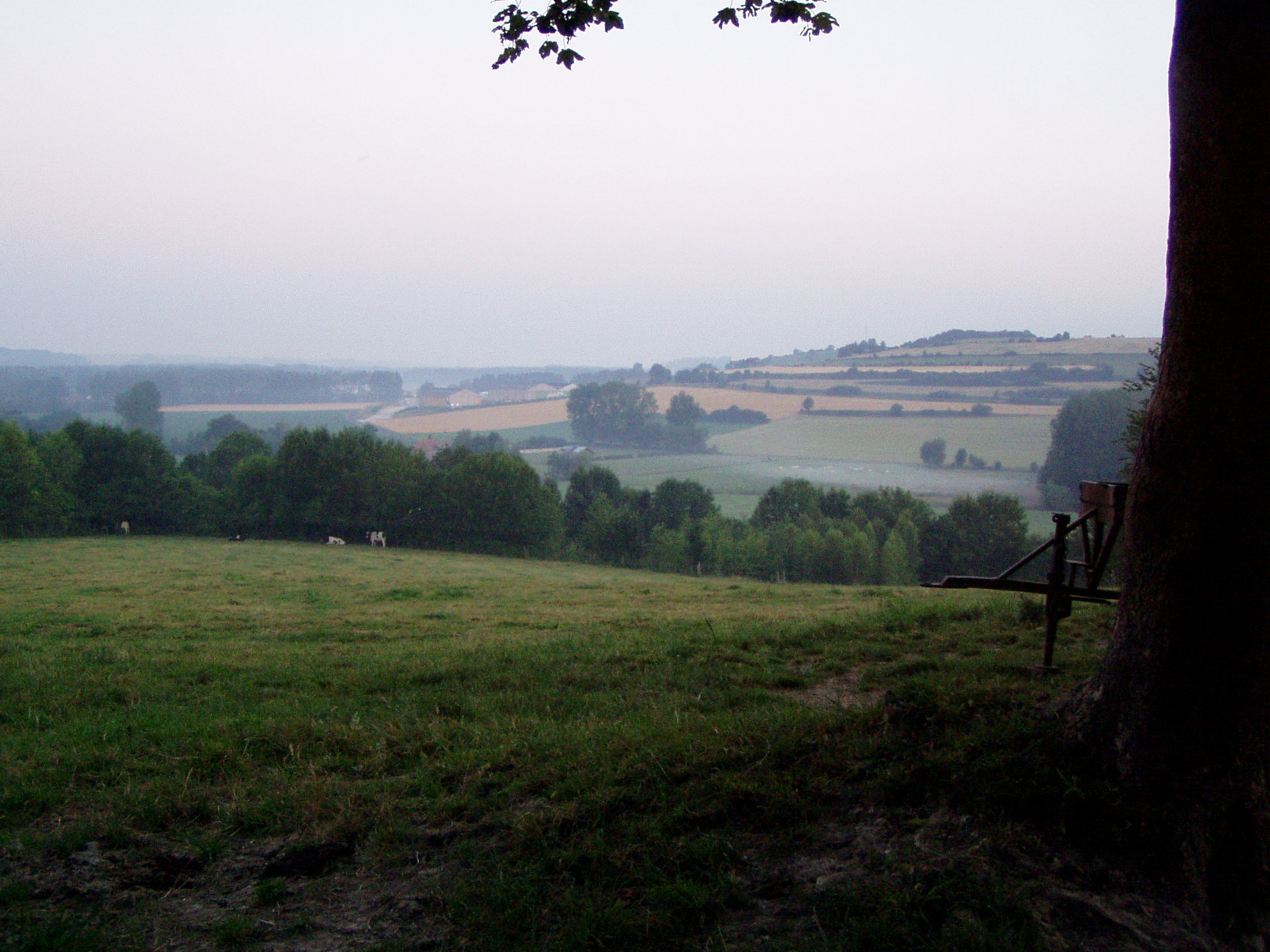
The countryside at Beaurainville

== See also ==
- Communes of the Pas-de-Calais department
