= Alys of France, Countess of Vexin =

Countess of Vexin (1160 – c. 1218–1220)

Alys of France
- Countess of Vexin; Countess consort of Ponthieu
- Born: 4 October 1160
- Died: c. 1218–1220 (aged 59–60)
- Spouse: William IV, Count of Ponthieu (m. 1195)
- Issue: Marie, Countess of Ponthieu
- House: Capet
- Father: Louis VII of France
- Mother: Constance of Castile

Alys of France, Countess of Vexin (4 October 1160 – c. 1218–1220), known in English as "Alice", was a French princess, initially betrothed to Richard I of England. Her engagement was broken in 1190, through negotiations between Richard and her half-brother Philip II of France. Philip then attempted to betroth her to Richard's brother John but this betrothal was rejected. Alys married William IV, Count of Ponthieu, on 20 August 1195. She died between 1218 and 1220.

== Life ==
Born 4 October 1160, Alys was the daughter of Louis VII, King of France and his second wife, Constance of Castile. She was the half-sister of Marie and Alix of France, Louis's children by Eleanor of Aquitaine, and the younger sister of Margaret of France. Just five weeks after Constance died giving birth to Alys, Louis married Adèle of Champagne, by whom he had two further children, including the future King Philip II of France.

In January 1169, Alys was contracted, by Louis and King Henry II of England, for marriage to Henry's son Richard the Lionheart. The 8-year-old Alys was then sent, with no dowry, to England as Henry's ward.

In 1177, Cardinal Peter of Saint Chrysogonus, on behalf of Pope Alexander III, threatened to place England's continental possessions under an interdict if Henry did not proceed with the marriage. There were widespread rumors that Henry had not only made Alys his mistress, but that she had a child with him. According to some sources, he might have raped her. Henry died in 1189, and Richard ascended the English throne. Richard broke off Alys' betrothal in 1190, during personal talks with her brother the French king, Philip Augustus, on their way towards the Holy Land during the Third Crusade. Richard made financial restitutions and married Berengaria of Navarre on 12 May 1191.

Philip had offered Alys to Prince John, but Eleanor prevented the match. Alys married William IV Talvas, Count of Ponthieu, on 20 August 1195. They had a daughter, Marie, Countess of Ponthieu. Alys died between 1218 and 1220.

== Sources ==
- Baldwin, John W. (2002). Aristocratic Life in Medieval France. Johns Hopkins University Press.
- Bartlett, W. B. (2019). Richard the Lionheart: The Crusader King of England. Amberley Publishing.
- Cockrill, Sara (2019). Eleanor of Aquitaine Queen of France and England, Mother of Empires. Amberly Publishing. p. PT373. "The most salacious version of this story come (again) from Gerald of Wales, who says that from around this time Henry took Alys as his mistress... ... a number of other sources also suggest Henry took Alys as his mistress."
- Gillingham, John (1999). Richard I. Yale University Press.
- Hosler, John D. (2007). Henry II: A Medieval Soldier at War, 1147–1189. Brill.
- Krause, Kathy M. (2019). "From Mothers to Daughters: Literary Patronage as Political Work in Ponthieu". In Tanner, Heather J. (ed.). Medieval Elite Women and the Exercise of Power, 1100–1400: Moving beyond the Exceptionalist Debate. Palgrave Macmillan.
- Madden, Thomas F. (1999). The Concise History of the Crusades. Rowman & Littlefield.83
- Warren, W. L. (1978). King John. University of California Press.
- York, Laura (1999). "Adele of Champagne". In Commire, Anne; Klezmer, Deborah (eds.). Women in World History: A Biographical Encyclopedia. Vol. I: Aak-Azz. Yorkin Publications. ISBN 978-0-7876-4063-7.
- York, Laura (1999a). "Alais of France". In Commire, Anne; Klezmer, Deborah (eds.). Women in World History: A Biographical Encyclopedia. Vol. I: Aak-Azz. Yorkin Publications.
