= Gisela of France, Countess of Ponthieu =

10th-century Countess of Ponthieu

Coat-of-arms of Capetians.

Gisèle of France (also known as Gisela and Gisla) (c. 968 – 1002) was the daughter of Hugh Capet and Adelaide of Aquitaine.

== Life ==
Born around 968-70 as the youngest daughter of Hugh and Adelaide de Aquitaine. Gisele's maternal grandparents were William III, Duke of Aquitaine and Adele of Normandy, daughter of Rollo of Normandy.

Gisele gained the title of princess after her father was elected the new king by an assembly of Frankish magnates at Senlis in 987.

== Marriage ==
Gisela was married to Count Hugh I of Ponthieu around 994.After her marriage she held the title Dame d'Abbeville as that was one of her husband's fiefs.

Gisela's children by Hugh included:

- Enguerrand I of Ponthieu
- Giselberthe de Encre (c. 990-1041)
- Alexis de Bernâtre (c. 1000-1057)
- Guy I of Ponthieu

== Sources ==
- Tanner, Heather (2004). Families, Friends and Allies: Boulogne and Politics in Northern France and England, c.879-1160. Brill.
