= John I of Aumale =

John I of Ponthieu

Count of Ponthieu
- Predecessor: Joan of Dammartin
- Successor: John II of Ponthieu
- Born: unknown
- Died: 1302; Kortrijk, County of Flanders, Kingdom of France
- Spouse: Ida of Meulan
- Issue: John II of Ponthieu
- House: Ponthieu-Ivrea
- Father: Ferdinand of Castile
- Mother: Laura of Montfort

John I of Ponthieu (died July 11, 1302, Kortrijk, County of Flanders, Kingdom of France) was Count of Aumale.

He was son of Ferdinand II, Count of Aumale, and Laura of Montfort.

After the death of his father in 1260, he became co-ruler in the County of Aumale with his grandmother Joan. They reigned together until her death in 1279.

John contested the claim of his aunt Eleanor of Castile to the County of Ponthieu from 1279 until being paid off by regent Edmund Crouchback in 1293.

John married Ida of Meulan, and had a son John II (1293–1343), who succeeded him.

John fought as a knight in the French army against the Flemish in the Battle of the Golden Spurs on July 11, 1302 near Kortrijk, and was one of the many nobles killed in the battle. (Note: Listed as the Count of Aumale.)

== Sources ==
- Johnstone, Hilda (1914). The County of Ponthieu, 1279-1307. The English Historical Review, Jul., 1914, Vol. 29, No. 115.
- Parsons, John Carmi (1977). The Court and Household of Eleanor of Castile in 1290. Pontifical Institute of Mediaeval Studies.
- Power, Daniel (2004). The Norman Frontier in the Twelfth and Early Thirteenth Centuries. Cambridge University Press.
- Verbruggen, J. F. (2002). DeVries, Kelly (ed.). The Battle of the Golden Spurs (Courtrai, 11 July 1302). Translated by Ferguson, David Richard. The Boydell Press.
