= Adela of Ponthieu, Countess of Surrey =

French noblewoman

- Born: Adela Talvas, Adela of Ponthieu c. 1110; Alençon, Normandy
- Died: 10 October 1174; England
- Buried: Bradenstoke Priory, Bradenstoke, Wiltshire, England
- Noble family: House of Bellême
- Spouses: William de Warenne, 3rd Earl of Surrey; Patrick, 1st Earl of Salisbury
- Issue: 5, including Isabel de Warenne, Countess of Surrey, William of Salisbury, 2nd Earl of Salisbury
- Father: William III, Count of Ponthieu
- Mother: Helie of Burgundy

Adela of Ponthieu (c. 1110 – 10 October 1174), also known as Ela, was the daughter of William III, Count of Ponthieu and Helie of Burgundy. She became Countess of Surrey, then Countess of Salisbury, by marriage.

== Early life ==
Adela was born about 1110 and was the daughter of William III, Count of Ponthieu, also seigneur de Montgomery, and Helie of Burgundy. The Gesta Normannorum Ducum records that she had three brothers and a sister.

Adela's paternal grandparents were Robert II of Bellême and Agnes, Countess of Ponthieu. Her maternal grandparents were Odo I, Duke of Burgundy and Sibylla of Burgundy, Duchess of Burgundy.

== Marriages and issue ==
Adela firstly married William de Warenne, 3rd Earl of Surrey.

William and Adela had one daughter and sole heiress:

- Isabel de Warenne (c. 1137 – 12 July 1203), suo jure 4th Countess of Surrey. Isabel married firstly, in 1148, William of Blois, the younger son of King Stephen, who became earl in her right. They had no issue. She married secondly, in 1164, Hamelin of Anjou, the illegitimate half-brother of King Henry II, who became jure uxoris Earl of Surrey and adopted her surname de Warenne. They had four children including William de Warenne, 5th Earl of Surrey and Adela de Warenne.

Adela's first husband William died in January 1148 at the Battle of Mount Cadmus near Laodicea while on crusade with his half-brother Waleran de Beaumont, Count of Meulan, and their second cousin, King Louis VII of France.

Adela married, secondly, in 1148 or 1149, Patrick of Salisbury, 1st Earl of Salisbury, uncle of William Marshal.

Adela and Patrick had children:

- William of Salisbury, 2nd Earl of Salisbury (d. 1196). He married Eléonore de Vitré and they had one daughter and sole heiress, Ela of Salisbury suo jure 4th Countess of Salisbury. Ela married William Longespée, illegitimate son of King Henry II by his mistress Ida de Tosny, and the half-brother of Richard I and John. He became earl in her right. They had eight or nine children. She founded Lacock Abbey and Hinton Charterhouse, and after her husband died, assumed the post of Sheriff of Wiltshire which he had held.
- Walter of Salisbury, died in infancy.
- Patrick of Salisbury, died in infancy.
- Philip of Salisbury, died in infancy.

== Death ==
Adela died on 10 October 1174. She was buried at Bradenstoke Priory, Wiltshire.

== Sources ==
- Clay, Charles Travis; Farrer, William, eds. (2013). Early Yorkshire Charters. Vol. 8: The Honour of Warenne. Cambridge University Press. ISBN 9781108058315.
