= Helie of Burgundy =

Burgundian noblewoman

- Coat-of-arms of dukes of Burgundy
- Born: c. 1080
- Died: 28 February 1141; Perseigne Abbey in Neufchâtel-en-Saosnois
- Noble family: House of Burgundy
- Spouses: Bertrand of Toulouse; William III, Count of Ponthieu
- Issue: Guy II of Ponthieu; John I, Count of Alençon; Clementia; Philip; Adela of Warenne, Countess of Surrey
- Father: Odo I, Duke of Burgundy
- Mother: Sibylla of Burgundy

Helie of Burgundy (c. 1080 – 28 February 1141) was the daughter of Odo I, Duke of Burgundy and Sibylla of Burgundy, Duchess of Burgundy.

In June 1095, Helie married Bertrand of Toulouse, as his second wife. They had one son, Pons of Tripoli (c. 1098–1137). (Note: According to the Orderic Vitalis, Helen of Burgundy is the mother of Pons of Tripoli, although this is disputed by William of Malmesbury)

Bertrand succeeded his father as Count of Toulouse in 1105, and in 1108, he set out for Outremer to claim his father's rights as Count of Tripoli. Helie accompanied him on this expedition, which resulted in the capture of Tripoli in 1109; shortly after, their nephew, William-Jordan died of wounds, giving Bertrand an undisputed claim to Tripoli.

Bertrand died in 1112, and Pons succeeded him in Tripoli. Helie returned to France, where she married William III of Ponthieu in 1115. They had:

- Guy II of Ponthieu (d. 1147)
- John I, Count of Alençon (d. 1191)
- Clementia (d. bef. 1189), married Juhel, Sire de Mayenne
- Philip (d. bef. 1150)
- Adela, (d. 10 October 1174), married first William de Warenne, 3rd Earl of Surrey, and second Patrick of Salisbury, 1st Earl of Salisbury

Helie died on 28 February 1141, in Perseigne Abbey in Neufchâtel-en-Saosnois.

== Bibliography ==
- Bouchard, Constance Brittain (1987). Sword, Miter, and Cloister: Nobility and the Church in Burgundy, 980–1198. Cornell University Press.
- Lewis, Kevin James (2017). The Counts of Tripoli and Lebanon in the Twelfth Century: Sons of Saint-Gilles. Routledge.
- Tanner, Heather (2004). Families, Friends and Allies: Boulogne and Politics in Northern France and England, c.879-1160. Brill.
