= Philippe of Dammartin =

French noblewoman

Philippe of Dammartin (Philippa de Dammartin) was a 13th-century noblewoman. Philippe was the daughter of Marie, Countess of Ponthieu, and her husband, Simon of Dammartin. She was the sister of Joan, Countess of Ponthieu, wife of Ferdinand III of Castile and mother of Eleanor of Castile, the wife of Edward I of England.

Philippe married three times.
1. Her first marriage was to Raoul II of Lusignan in ca 1239/40. Philippe was his third wife. They had no children, but she was the stepmother of Marie de Lusignan.
2. Her second marriage was to Raoul II, Lord of Coucy in ca. 1246. They had one child:

- Enguerrand de Coucy, died young (before 1250).

3. Her third marriage was to Otto II, Count of Guelders between 1252 and 1254. They had four children:

- Reginald I, Count of Guelders.
- Philippa of Guelders, who married Waleran II, Lord of Valkenburg.
- Margaret of Guelders, who married Dietrich VII, Count of Cleves.
- Maria of Guelders.

== Sources ==
- Pollock, M.A. (2015). Scotland, England and France after the Loss of Normandy, 1204-1296. The Boydell Press.
