= Patrick, 1st Earl of Salisbury =

Anglo-Norman nobleman (c. 1122–1168)

Patrick of Salisbury, 1st Earl of Salisbury (c. 1122 – 1168) was an Anglo-Norman nobleman, and the uncle of William Marshal.

His parents were Walter of Salisbury (son of Edward of Salisbury) and Sibyl de Chaworth. Before 1141, Patrick was constable of Salisbury in Wiltshire, a powerful local official but not a nobleman. That year, Patrick married his sister, Sibyl, to John fitzGilbert the Marshal, who had been a local rival of his, and transferred his allegiance from King Stephen to the Empress Matilda. This political move gained him his earldom, and the friendship of John the Marshal. Patrick's nephew, William Marshal, would go on to become regent of England during the minority of Henry III. For a time William served as a household knight with Patrick during the latter's time as governor of Poitou.

The Earl of Salisbury minted his own coins, struck in the county town of Salisbury during the so-called "baronial issues" of 1135–1153. Only four examples have survived, three of which are in the Conte collection.

Patrick married twice, his second wife being Ela, daughter of William III Talvas, Duke of Alençon and Ponthieu, whom he married in 1149. Ela was widow of William de Warenne, 3rd Earl of Surrey. Patrick and Ela had; William, Walter and Philip.

Patrick was killed at Poitiers, France on 27 March 1168 in an ambush by members of the Lusignan family.

== Sources ==
- Barlow, Frank. The Feudal Kingdom of England 1042–1216 London: Longman Group Limited, 1961. ISBN 0-582-48237-2
- Clay, Charles Travis; Farrer, William, eds. (2013). Early Yorkshire Charters. Vol. 8: The Honour of Warenne. Cambridge University Press. ISBN 9781108058315.
- Gee, Loveday Lewes (2002). Women, Art and Patronage from Henry III to Edward III: 1216-1377. The Boydell Press. ISBN 978-0851158617.
- Hivergneaux, Marie (2016). "Queen Eleanor and Aquitaine, 1137-1189". In Wheeler, Bonnie; Parsons, John Carmi (eds.). Eleanor of Aquitaine, Lord and Lady. Palgrave Macmillan. pp. 55–76. ISBN 9781137052629.
- Morris, W. A. (1918). "The Office of Sheriff in the Early Norman Period". The English Historical Review. 33: 145–175.

Peerage of England
| New creation | Earl of Salisbury c. 1145–1168 | Succeeded by William of Salisbury |
