= William III of Ponthieu =

Count of Ponthieu

- Born: c. 1093
- Died: 1172
- Noble family: House of Bellême
- Spouse: Helie of Burgundy
- Issue Detail: Guy II of Ponthieu; John I, Count of Alençon; Adela of Ponthieu, Countess of Surrey
- Father: Robert II of Bellême
- Mother: Agnes of Ponthieu

William III of Ponthieu (c. 1093 – 1171) also called William (II; III) Talvas. (Note: Orderic Vitalis and Robert de Torigny both mentioned his nickname 'Talvas' but he is not known to have used it when granting or attesting his own charters,[G. E. Cokayne, The Complete Peerage, Vol. XI (The St. Catherine Press, London, 1949) p. 697 n. (a)] but in a notification by the monks of St. Michel he was styled Willelmus Tallevat comes Pontivi. [Calendar of Documents Preserved in France, ed. J. Horace Round (Eyre and Spottiswoode, 1899), no. 737]) He was seigneur de Montgomery in Normandy and Count of Ponthieu.

== Life ==
Born circa 1093, William was son of Robert of Bellême and Agnes of Ponthieu. He succeeded his father as count of Ponthieu some time between 1105 and 1111, when he alone as count made a gift to the abbey of Cluny. His father Robert de Bellême had turned against Henry I on several occasions, had escaped capture at the battle of Tinchebrai in 1106 commanding Duke Robert Curthose's rear guard and later, while serving as envoy for King Louis VI of France, he was arrested by Henry I and imprisoned for life. William was naturally driven by this to oppose King Henry. In June 1119, however, Henry I restored all his father's lands in Normandy. In 1124, William and his brother-in-law, Duke Hugh II of Burgundy, dispatched forces to Reims to support their overlord, King Louis VI of France, in his conflict with Emperor Henry V.

Sometime prior to 1126, William resigned the county of Ponthieu to his son Guy but retained the title of count. In 1127, William gave land located in the present-day department of Manche to the abbey of Saint-Sauveur-le-Vicomte, which had never been supported by his family. During 1135, he was repeatedly called to King Henry I's court, but due to the fate of his father, William was fully aware of the dangers of visiting and chose to decline the invitation. By September, he had returned to his Manceau estates, whereupon, Henry I again confiscated all his Norman lands. William responded by joining Count Geoffrey V of Anjou in his invasion of Normandy after Henry I's death. With the on-going civil war between Matilda, Geoffrey's wife, and her cousin, Stephen of Blois, William's lands were placed under interdict by bishop of Sées. William fought alongside Geoffrey in the Norman campaign in September of 1136, but they had to retreat. By 1137, he retired from Norman ducal politics, instead founding Saint-Andre-en-Gouffern and Notre-Dame de Persiegne, a Cistercian abbey.

Following his son, Guy's death on crusade in 1147, William wrote to his grandson, newly appointed count John, urging him, for the sake of his father's soul, to return property to the priory of Abbeville.

In March 1166, William and his grandson Count John I of Ponthieu (d. 1191) rebelled; opposing commands of Queen Eleanor, who ruled Normandy while her husband, King Henry II of England, was campaigning in Wales. William and John's rebellion, largely ineffective and short-lived, cost them their castles of Alençon and La Roche Mabille, which Henry took through mere intimidation. William, in particular, lost lands in both England and Normandy, which represented the political shift that had occurred as a result of Henry’s growing influence.

William died in 1171 and was buried at Notre-Dame de Persiegne.

== Family ==
William married, abt. 1115, Helie of Burgundy, daughter of Eudes I, Duke of Burgundy. The Gesta Normannorum Ducum says that they had five children, three sons and two daughters. The five both agree on are:

- Guy II. He assumed the county of Ponthieu during his father Talvas' lifetime, but died in 1147 predeceasing his father.
- John I, Count of Alençon, married Beatrix d'Anjou, daughter of Elias II, Count of Maine and Philippa, daughter of Rotrou III, Count of Perche.
- Clementia married (abt. 1189) Juhel, son of Walter of Mayenne.
- Adela (aka Ela) married William de Warenne, 3rd Earl of Surrey. She married, secondly, Patrick of Salisbury

== Sources ==
- Clay, Charles Travis; Farrer, William, eds. (2013). Early Yorkshire Charters. Vol. 8: The Honour of Warenne. Cambridge University Press. ISBN 9781108058315.
- Cokayne, G. E. (1949). The Complete Peerage. Vol. XI. The St. Catherine Press.
- Hosler, John D. (2007). Henry II: A Medieval Soldier at War, 1147-1189. Brill.
- Keats-Rohan, K.S.B. (2002). Domesday Descendants: A Prosopography of Persons Occurring in English Documents 1066-1166. Vol. II Pipe Rolls to Cartae Baronum. Boydell & Brewer.
- Tanner, Heather (2004). Families, Friends and Allies: Boulogne and Politics in Northern France and England, c.879-1160. Brill.
- Thompson, Kathleen (1994). "William Talvas, Count of Ponthieu, and the Politics of the Anglo-Norman Realm". In Bates, David; Curry, Ann (eds.). England and Normandy in the Middle Ages. Hambledon Press.
- Thompson, Kathleen (2009). Power and Border Lordship in Medieval France: The County of the Perche, 1000-1226. The Boydell Press.

William III of Ponthieu House of Bellême Born: c. 1093 Died: 20 June 1172
Preceded by Agnes	Count of Ponthieu before 1105 – before 1129	Succeeded by Guy II
