= Enguerrand II of Ponthieu =

11th-century French nobleman

Enguerrand II (d. 25 October 1053) was the son of Hugh II count of Ponthieu. He assumed the county upon the death of his father on November 20, 1052.

== Life ==
Enguerrand II was the eldest son and heir of Hugh II, Count of Ponthieu and his wife Bertha of Aumale, heiress of Aumale. Enguerrand was married to Adelaide, daughter of Robert I, Duke of Normandy and sister of William the Conqueror. But at the Council of Reims in 1049, when the proposed marriage of Duke William with Matilda of Flanders was prohibited based on consanguinity, so was Enguerrand's existing marriage to Adelaide, causing him to be excommunicated. The marriage was apparently annulled c.1049/50. He had given her in dower, Aumale, which she retained after the dissolution of their marriage.

The Conqueror's uncle, William of Arques, who had originally challenged Duke William's right to the duchy based on his illegitimacy, had been given the county of Talou by Duke William as a fief, but still defiant and on his own authority proceeded to build a strong castle at Arques. Enguerrand was allied to William of Arques by virtue of the latter being married to Enguerrand's sister. By 1053 William of Arques was in open revolt against Duke William and Henry I of France came to William of Arques' aid invading Normandy and attempting to relieve the castle of Arques. Duke William had put Arques under siege, but had remained mobile with another force in the countryside nearby. To relieve the siege Enguerrand was with Henry I of France and on October 25, 1053 was killed when the Normans feigned a retreat in which Enguerrand and his companions followed and were ambushed, a tactic the Normans used again to great success at the Battle of Hastings.

== Issue ==
Enguerrand married Adelaide of Normandy, Countess of Aumale, daughter of Robert I, Duke of Normandy. (Note: The name of Adelaide's mother remains unsettled. David C. Douglas [William the Conqueror, 1964, pp. 381] stated that William had a sister or half-sister Adelaide; that she may have been the daughter of Robert I by a mistress other than Herleva, but that "it is more probable she was the Conqueror's sister of the whole blood". As such the question remains open.) By her he had a daughter:

- Adelaide, living in 1096.

As Enguerrand died without male issue he was followed by his brother Guy I as Count of Ponthieu.

== Sources ==
- Barlow, Frank, ed. (1999). The Carmen de Hastingae Proelio of Guy, Bishop of Amiens. Oxford University Press. ISBN 0-19-820758-1.
- Musset, Lucien (2005). The Bayeux Tapestry. Boydell Press.
- Paul, Nicholas L. (2012). To Follow in Their Footsteps: The Crusades and Family Memory in the High Middle Ages. Cornell University Press. "When Count Hugh II of Ponthieu died in 1052, his son Enguerrand II..."
- Power, Daniel (2004). The Norman Frontier in the Twelfth and Early Thirteenth Centuries. Cambridge University Press. ISBN 0-521-57172-3.
- Tanner, Heather (2004). Families, Friends and Allies: Boulogne and Politics in Northern France and England, C.879-1160. Brill.
- Thompson, Kathleen (2022). "The Perspective from Ponthieu: Count Guy and his Norman Neighbour". In Church, Stephen D. (ed.). Anglo-Norman Studies XLIV: Proceedings of the Battle Conference 2021. The Boydell Press. pp. 19–34. doi:10.1017/9781800106314. ISBN 978-1-80010-631-4. "It was not a happy start for Enguerrand's successor, his younger brother, Guy, who must have been a very young man in 1053.."

Preceded by Hugh II	Count of Ponthieu; 1052–1053	Succeeded by Guy I
