= Hugh II of Ponthieu =

11th Century French Count of Ponthieu

Hugh II of Ponthieu was count of Ponthieu and lord of Abbeville, the son of Enguerrand I of Ponthieu. Evidently, Hugh II was the half-brother of Guy, who became the bishop of Amiens; Fulk, who became the abbot of Forest l'Abbaye; and Robert. However, it is possible that both Robert and Hugh II were the sons of Enguerrand's first wife, and Guy and Fulk the sons of a later wife that Enguerrand I married when he was in his forties.

== Issue ==
Hugh II was married to Bertha of Aumale, Countess of Aumale. They had:

- Enguerrand II who succeeded Hugh II as Count of Ponthieu
- Robert
- Hugh
- Waleran (d.1054)
- Beatrice of Ponthieu (1022–1054) was married to William of Talou, the count of Arques (Note: Barlow's translation indicates a daughter of Hugh, no name is given.)
- Guy I, succeeded Enguerrand II as Count of Ponthieu

== Sources ==
- Barlow, Frank, ed. (1999). The Carmen de Hastingae Proelio of Guy, Bishop of Amiens. Oxford University Press. ISBN 0-19-820758-1.
- Paul, Nicholas L. (2012). To Follow in Their Footsteps: The Crusades and Family Memory in the High Middle Ages. Cornell University Press. "When Count Hugh II of Ponthieu died in 1052, his son Enguerrand II..."
- Power, Daniel (2007). The Norman Frontier in the Twelfth and Early Thirteenth Centuries. Cambridge University Press.
- Tanner, Heather (2004). Families, Friends and Allies: Boulogne and Politics in Northern France and England, c.879-637"/1160. Brill.
- Thompson, Kathleen (2022). "The Perspective from Ponthieu: Count Guy and his Norman Neighbour". In Church, Stephen D. (ed.). Anglo-Norman Studies XLIV: Proceedings of the Battle Conference 2021. The Boydell Press. pp. 19–34. doi:10.1017/9781800106314. ISBN 978-1-80010-631-4. "It was not a happy start for Enguerrand's successor, his younger brother, Guy, who must have been a very young man in 1053.."

Preceded by Enguerrand I	Count of Ponthieu c. 1045–1052	Succeeded by Enguerrand II
