= Ferdinand of Castile (born 1238) =

Infante of Castile

Count of Aumale

Baron of Montgomery

Baron of Noyelles-sur-Mer
- Born: 1238
- Died: 1264/1269
- Spouse: Laura of Montfort
- Issue: John I of Ponthieu
- House: Castilian House of Ivrea
- Father: Ferdinand III of Castile
- Mother: Joan of Ponthieu

Ferdinand of Castile (1238 – before 1264/1269), Infante of Castile, was the son of King Ferdinand III of Castile and Joan, Countess of Ponthieu.

He was the Count of Aumale, Baron of Montgomery and of Noyelles-sur-Mer.

== Biography ==
Ferdinand was born in 1238. After the death of his father in Seville on 30 May 1252, Joan of Danmartin and her older son left for France, from which Joan would never return. In France, Ferdinand inherited the County of Aumale and the Baronies of Montgomery and Noyelles-sur-Mer.

Although the date of his death is unknown, some authors put his death before 1264, while others indicate it must have been before July 25, 1269 because, at that time, his brother Infante Luis could be found in Toledo making a donation to the Order of Calatrava entitled "Heir to the County of Pontis".

== Marriage and descendants ==
He was married to Laura of Montfort, daughter of Amaury de Montfort, Count of Toulouse and Lord of Montfort. The marriage produced one live birth:

- John I of Ponthieu (died 1302). He inherited the possessions of his father and mother and died at the Battle of the Golden Spurs on about 11 July 1302. (Note: Listed as the Count of Aumale.)

== See also ==
- Crown of Castile

== Bibliography ==
- Evans, Charles F. H.; Brook, Lindsay Leonard (1989), "Occasional publication (Association for the Promotion of Scholarship in Genealogy), No. 2", in Association for the Promotion of Scholarship in Genealogy; Lindsay L. Brook (eds.), Studies in genealogy and family history in tribute to Charles Evans on the occasion of his eightieth birthday (1st ed.), Salt Lake City, OCLC 22235011
- González, Julio (2009), Editorial Maxtor (ed.), Las Conquistas de Fernando III en Andalucía (in Spanish) (1ª ed.), Valladolid, ISBN 9788497612777
- Ibáñez de Segovia, Gaspar (1777), Joachin Ibarra (ed.), Memorias históricas del Rei D. Alonso el Sabio i observaciones a su chronica (in Spanish), Madrid, OCLC 458042314
- Parsons, John Carmi (1977). The Court and Household of Eleanor of Castile in 1290. Pontifical Institute of Mediaeval Studies.
- Verbruggen, J. F. (2002). DeVries, Kelly (ed.). The Battle of the Golden Spurs (Courtrai, 11 July 1302). Translated by Ferguson, David Richard. The Boydell Press.
