= Marie of Ponthieu =

French noblewoman

Marie, Countess of Ponthieu
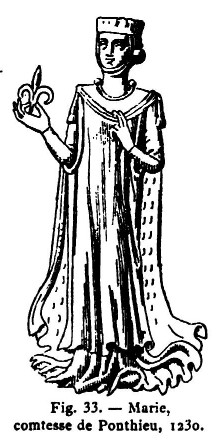
- Drawing of Marie's seal from 1880
- Born: 17 April 1199
- Died: 21 September 1250 (aged 51)
- Spouses: Simon of Dammartin; Mathieu de Montmorency, Seigneur d'Attichy
- Issue: Joan of Dammartin; Mathilda of Dammartin; Philippe of Dammartin; Maria of Dammartin
- Father: William IV of Ponthieu
- Mother: Alys, Countess of the Vexin

Marie of Ponthieu (17 April 1199 – 21 September 1250) was suo jure Countess of Ponthieu and Countess of Montreuil, ruling from 1221 to 1250.

== Biography ==
Marie was the daughter of William IV of Ponthieu and Alys, Countess of the Vexin, and granddaughter of King Louis VII of France by his second wife Constance of Castile. As her father's only surviving child, Marie succeeded him, ruling as Countess of Ponthieu and Montreuil from 1221 to 1250.

=== Marriages and children ===
Marie married Simon of Dammartin before September 1208. He was the son of Alberic II of Dammartin and Maud de Clermont, daughter of Renaud de Clermont, Count de Clermont-en-Beauvaisis.

Marie and Simon had:

- Joan, Countess of Ponthieu (1220–1278), married 1) Ferdinand III of Castile. Mother of Eleanor of Castile, the wife of Edward I of England. Married 2) Jean de Nesle, Seigneur de Falvy et de La Hérelle.
- Mathilda of Dammartin (-1279), married John of Châtellerault
- Philippe of Dammartin (-1280), married 1) Raoul II of Lusignan, 2) Raoul II, Lord of Coucy, 3) Otto II, Count of Guelders.
- Maria of Dammartin, married John II, Count of Roucy

Marie secondly married at some time between September 1240 and 15 December 1241, Mathieu de Montmorency, Seigneur d'Attichy, who was killed in battle at Mansurrah on 8 February 1250 during the Seventh Crusade, led by King Louis IX of France.

== Sources ==
- Baldwin, John W. (2002). Aristocratic Life in Medieval France. The Johns Hopkins University Press.
- Grant, Lindy (2005). Architecture and society in Normandy 1120-1270. Yale University Press.
- Johnstone, Hilda (1914). "The County of Ponthieu, 1279-1307". The English Historical Review. 29 (115 July). Oxford University Press.
- Pollock, M. A. (2015). Scotland, England and France After the Loss of Normandy, 1204-1296: "Auld Amitie". The Boydell Press.
- Rosenberg, Samuel N.; Pippenger, Randall T., eds. (2022). Tales of a Minstrel of Reims in the Thirteenth Century. The Catholic University of America Press.
- Shadis, Miriam (2009). Berenguela of Castile (1180-1246) and Political Women in the High Middle Ages. Palgrave Macmillan.

Preceded by William IV	Countess of Ponthieu; 1221–1250	Succeeded by Joan
