= John I, Count of Alençon =

John I (Jean I) (died 24 February 1191), Count of Alençon, son of William III Talvas, Count of Ponthieu, and Helie of Burgundy.

Recognized as Count of Alençon by Henry II of England, John succeeded his father in 1171. He was a supporter of the Perseigne Abbey and the Abbey of Saint-Martin of Troarn.

He married Beatrix of Maine, daughter of Elias II, Count of Maine, and Philippe, Countess of Perche. John and Beatrix had six children:

- John II (died May 1191), Count of Alençon, succeeded his father
- Robert (died 8 September 1217), Count of Alençon, succeeded John II. Married Jeanne de Preuilly, widow of Hugues V, Viscount of Châteaudun.
- Guillaume (died 1203)
- Ella d’Alençon, married to Hugh II, Viscount of Chatellerault
- Helie d’Alençon (died after May 1233), married Robert VI FitzErneis
- Philippa d’Alençon (died before 1223), married first to William III of Roumare (died 1198; grandson of William de Roumare), second to William Malet, Lord of Graville, and third, to William de Préaux.

Near the end of his life, he planned to participate in the Third Crusade, but died February 24, 1191, at the Chateau d'Alençon. He was succeeded as Count of Alençon by his son John.

== Sources ==
- Painter, Sidney (1955). "The Houses of Lusignan and Chatellerault 1150–1250". Speculum. 30 (3): 374–384. doi:10.2307/2848076. JSTOR 2848076. S2CID 162997835.
- Power, Daniel (2004). The Norman Frontier in the Twelfth and Early Thirteenth Centuries. Cambridge University Press.
- Thompson, Kathleen (1994). "William Talvas, Count of Ponthieu, and the Politics of the Anglo-Norman Realm". In Bates, David; Curry, Ann (eds.). England and Normandy in the Middle Ages. Hambledon Press.
- Thompson, Kathleen (2009). Power and Border Lordship in Medieval France: The County of the Perche, 1000-1226. The Boydell Press.
