= William IV of Ponthieu =

Count of Ponthieu

William IV, Count of Ponthieu
- Born: 1179
- Died: 4 October 1221 (aged 41–42)
- Noble family: Bellême
- Spouse: Alys, Countess of the Vexin
- Issue: Marie, Countess of Ponthieu
- Father: John I, Count of Ponthieu
- Mother: Beatrice de St Pol

William IV Talvas (1179 – 4 October 1221) was William III, Count of Ponthieu and William IV (of the house of Belleme/Montgomery). He was Count of Ponthieu, ruler of a small province in northern France that fell under the suzerainty of the dukes of Normandy (later also kings of England) since at least the mid 11th century.

== Life ==
William was the son of John I, Count of Ponthieu and Beatrice de St Pol. His father John I, Count of Ponthieu (died 1191) was the son of Guy II, Count of Ponthieu (who died on the Second Crusade 1147). William was an army commander in the Anglo-French War (1202–1214) and one of the commanders of the left wing of the French army in the Battle of Bouvines in 1214. William also participated in the Albigensian Crusade, particularly in the siege of Termes in 1210, where he and the count of Dreux informed Simon de Montfort they had fulfilled their indulgences and were departing the siege.

== Marriage ==
William was married on 20 August 1195 to Alys, Countess of Vexin, the daughter of King Louis VII of France. She was some eighteen years older than he, and was said by some to have been a mistress of King Henry II of England while betrothed to his son, King Richard the Lionheart. Richard sent her back to her brother, King Philip II of France, refusing to marry her. Philip then arranged for Alys to marry William Talvas. Alys gave birth to a daughter and heiress, Marie, in 1199. William Talvas died in 1221, his daughter Marie being his heiress.

== Sources ==
- Baldwin, John W. (2002). Aristocratic Life in Medieval France. Johns Hopkins University Press.
- Bennett, Matthew; Bradbury, Jim; DeVries, Kelly; Dickie, Iain; Jestice, Phyllis (2005). Fighting Techniques of the Medieval World: Equipment, Combat Skills and Tactics. St. Martin's Press.
- Parsons, John Carmi (1977). The Court and Household of Eleanor of Castile in 1290. Pontifical Institute of Mediaeval Studies.
- Sumption, Jonathan (1999). The Albigensian Crusade. Faber & Faber.
- Tanner, Heather J., ed. (2019). Medieval Elite Women and the Exercise of Power, 1100–1400: Moving beyond the Exceptionalist Debate. Palgrave Macmillan.

| Preceded by John I | Count of Ponthieu; 1191–1221 | Succeeded by Marie |
