= Enguerrand I of Ponthieu =

Count of Ponthieu from 1026-1045

Enguerrand I
- Count of Ponthieu
- Reign: c. 1026 – c. 1045
- Predecessor: Hugh I, Count of Ponthieu
- Successor: Hugh II, Count of Ponthieu
- Died: c. 1045
- Buried: Saint-Riquier
- Noble family: House of Ponthieu
- Spouse: Adelina of Holland
- Issue: Hugh II, Count of Ponthieu; Guy, Bishop of Amiens; Fulk (Abbot of Forest-l’Abbaye)
- Father: Hugh I, Count of Ponthieu
- Mother: Gisela of France

Enguerrand I, Count of Ponthieu, was recognized as count by 1026-7, evidenced by a royal charter of that date. Enguerrand is recorded as attending the court of Duke Robert of Normandy before Robert left on a pilgrimage to the Holy Land in 1035. When his son Hugh married Bertha of Aumale, the family's territory expanded. Enguerrand died in 1045 and was succeeded by his son Hugh II of Ponthieu.

== Life ==
Enguerrand was the son of Hugh I of Ponthieu and Gisela, daughter of Hugh Capet. In 1026–7, Enguerrand, using the title of count, endorsed a charter in the presence of King Robert II. He had holdings at Conteville, near Doullens, east of Abbeville, which might have been remnants of a Carolingian county. He held authority in Vimeu, having repelled an attack by Gilbert, Count of Brionne, inflicting significant losses on the Brionne forces.

By the 1030s, Enguerrand had become a key figure with influence among neighbouring territories. Duke Robert of Normandy was keen to gain Enguerrand's backing before embarking on his pilgrimage to the Holy Land. His presence at Duke Robert’s court just before Robert's departure indicates his significant influence. By 1043, Enguerrand had invested time to prepare his son, Hugh, as successor. It is likely that Enguerrand also orchestrated Hugh's marriage to Bertha, the daughter of Guerinfridus, the castellan of Aumale, located on the upper River Bresle between Normandy and the Beauvaisis region, thereby expanding the family's territorial holdings further south.

Enguerrand died around 1045 and was buried at Saint-Riquier France.

== Marriages and children ==
Enguerrand married Adelina, widow of Baudouin de Boulogne, daughter of Arnulf, Count of Holland, they had:

- Hugh II
- Guy, Bishop of Amiens
- Fulk (later abbot of Forest l'Abbaye) (Note: Heather Tanner lists Fulk as the son of Enguerrand and his third wife Berta)

== Sources ==
- Bishop of Amiens (1999). Barlow, Frank (ed.). The Carmen de Hastingae Proelio of Guy, Bishop of Amiens. Clarendon Press. ISBN 9780191646799.
- Douglas, David (1946). "The Earliest Norman Counts". The English Historical Review. 61 (240 May).
- Power, Daniel (2007). The Norman Frontier in the Twelfth and Early Thirteenth Centuries. Cambridge University Press.
- Tanner, Heather (2004). Families, Friends and Allies: Boulogne and Politics in Northern France and England, c.879-1160. Brill.
- Thompson, Kathleen (2022). "The Perspective from Ponthieu: Count Guy and his Norman Neighbour". In Church, Stephen D. (ed.). Anglo-Norman Studies XLIV: Proceedings of the Battle Conference 2021. The Boydell Press. pp. 19–34. doi:10.1017/9781800106314. ISBN 978-1-80010-631-4.

Preceded by Hugh I	Count of Ponthieu c. 1000 – c. 1045	Succeeded by Hugh II
