= John D. Hosler =

American medievalist

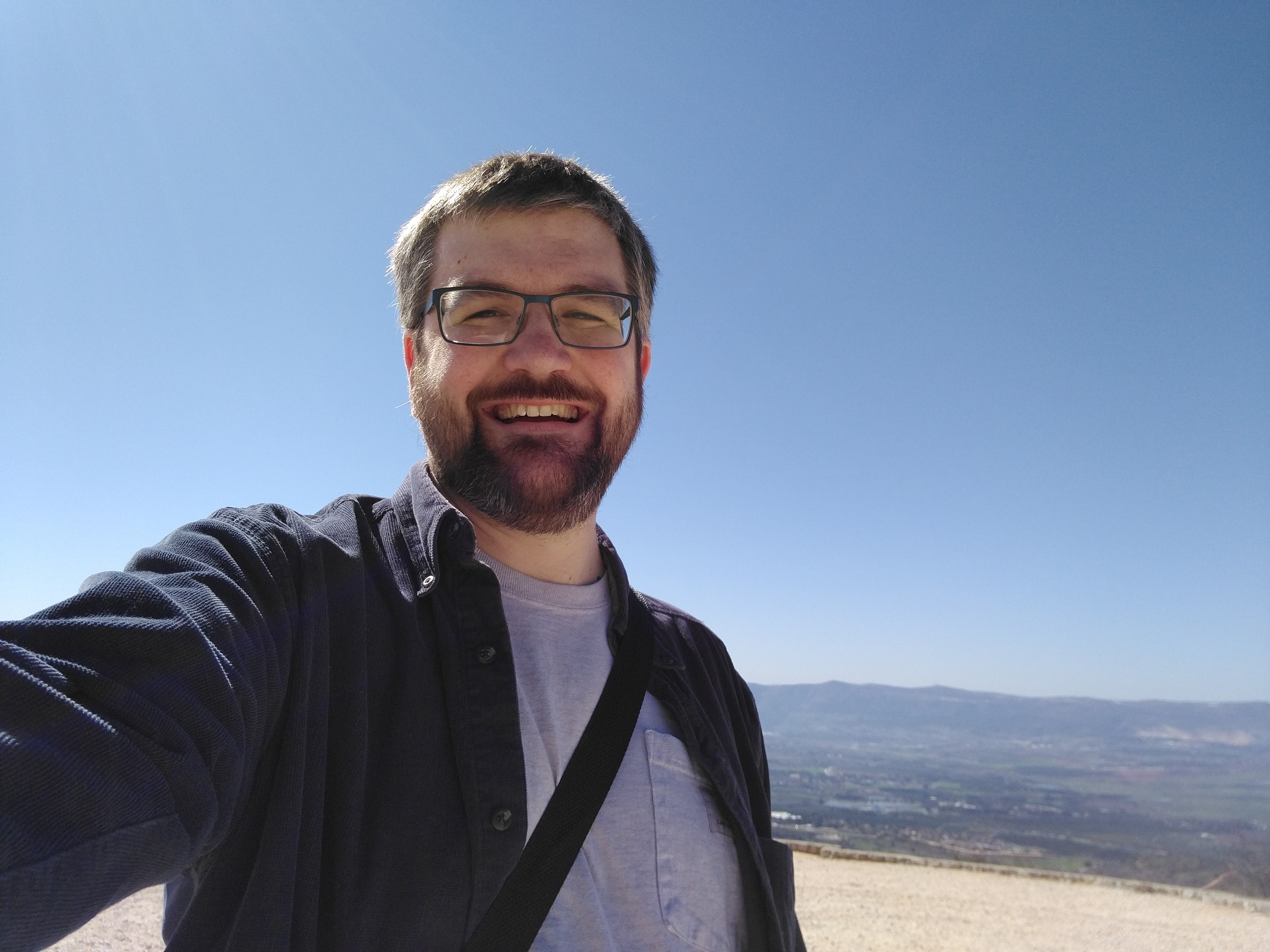
- John Hosler at Kibbutz Ein-Gev in 2017
- Occupation: Professor, Command and General Staff College
- Citizenship: American
- Education: B.A. English and History M.A. English; M.A. History Ph.D. History
- Alma mater: Iowa State University University of Delaware
- Genre: Military History
- Subject: Medieval Warfare
- Notable works: The Siege of Acre Jerusalem Falls

John D. Hosler is a medieval historian and Professor of Military History at the Command and General Staff College at Fort Leavenworth, Kansas. He specializes in the history of warfare in Europe and the Near East during the 11th-13th centuries.

== Education ==
Hosler matriculated at Iowa State University, where he received a B.A. in English literature and history, an M.A. in English literature, and an M.A. in history. He earned his Ph.D. in history at the University of Delaware in 2005, studying under Professors Daniel F. Callahan and Lawrence G. Duggan.

== Career ==
Hosler first taught as tenured professor of history at Morgan State University in Baltimore, MD, before taking a position at Fort Leavenworth in 2017.

=== Military history ===
Hosler has served as President of De Re Militari: The Society for Medieval Military History and as a Trustee of the U.S. Commission for Military History, for which he also serves as a juror for the Collins Book Prize. He is Co-Editor of the book series "War and Conflict in Premodern Societies", published by ARC Humanities Press, and he sits on the Editorial Board of War Studies Journal. His book, The Siege of Acre, was named a Best Book of 2018 by The Financial Times.

== Books ==
- Hosler, John D. and Daniel P. Franke (eds.). Routledge Handbook of Medieval Military Strategy. London and New York: Routledge, 2024. ISBN 978-1-032-32506-4
- Hosler, John D. Jerusalem Falls: Seven Centuries of War and Peace. New Haven and London: Yale University Press, 2022. ISBN 978-0-300-25514-0
- Hosler, John D. (ed.). Seven Myths of Military History. Indianapolis: Hackett Publishing, 2022. ISBN 978-1-64792-043-2
- Hosler, John D. and Steven Isaac (eds.). Military Cultures and Martial Enterprises: Essays in Honour of Richard P. Abels. Woodbridge: The Boydell Press, 2020. ISBN 978-1-78327-533-5
- Hosler, John D. The Siege of Acre, 1189-1191: Saladin, Richard the Lionheart, and the Battle that Decided the Third Crusade. New Haven and London: Yale University Press, 2018. ISBN 978-0-300-21550-2
- Frassetto, Michael, Matthew Gabriele, and John D. Hosler (eds.). Where Heaven and Earth Meet: Essays on Medieval Europe in Honor of Daniel F. Callahan. Leiden and Boston: Brill, 2014. ISBN 978-90-04-27414-3
- Hosler, John D. John of Salisbury: Military Authority of the Twelfth-Century Renaissance. Leiden and Boston: Brill, 2013. ISBN 978-90-04-22663-0
- Hosler, John D. Henry II: a Medieval Soldier at War, 1147-1189. Leiden and Boston: Brill, 2007. ISBN 978-90-04-15724-8
