= Guy I of Ponthieu =

11th-century French noble

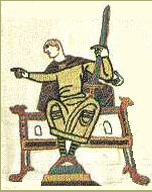
Guy of Ponthieu on the Bayeux tapestry

Guy I of Ponthieu (also known in the Bayeux Tapestry as Wido) was born sometime in the mid-to late 1020s and died 13 October 1100. He succeeded his brother Enguerrand II as Count of Ponthieu.

== Life ==
Guy was a son of Hugh II, Count of Ponthieu, and Bertha of Aumale. About 1053, he succeeded his brother Enguerrand II as Count of Ponthieu. The Ponthievin alliance with Duke William of Normandy had earlier been secured by the marriage of Enguerrand to Adelaide of Normandy, Duke William's sister. However, the marriage was apparently annulled due to consanguinity c.1049/50. Enguerrand's and Guy's unnamed sister was married to William of Talou, son of Richard II, Duke of Normandy. William of Talou had built a strong castle at Arques, and from it (in 1053) he defied his nephew the youthful Duke of Normandy. As "family", the comital house of Ponthieu supported the rebellion.

Duke William put Arques under siege, and then remained mobile with another force in the countryside nearby. He was aware that Normandy was being threatened by the armies of King Henry I of France, who wanted to bring his young, former vassal to heel; and that Normandy's erstwhile allies from Ponthieu would also be coming to break the siege of Arques. Young Count Enguerrand led a Ponthievin army into the Talou to relieve Arques, and arrived first, but Duke William successfully ambushed them and Enguerrand was killed. Upon learning of this serious reverse, the vacillating Henry withdrew his forces at once back across the Norman border. William of Talou was compelled to surrender Arques and was banished for life. (Alternatively, the story goes that Henry reinforced Arques, and Duke William lured part of the French army, including Enguerrand and the Ponthievins, away by a feigned flight, then turned on them and won a battle: Henry then withdrew, forcing the surrender of Arques not long after.)

With the death of his older brother (who was without male issue or heirs), Guy assumed the comital duties: this is the first mention of Guy in the historical record.

In February 1054, Henry was again ready to chastise Duke William: he reentered the duchy with a large army of his own liegemen and an Angevin army led by Geoffrey II, Count of Anjou. This combined force moved down the Seine toward Rouen, while Henry's brother Eudes "led" a second army, along with Guy and Count Rainald of Clairmont. The Franco-Ponthievin army was undisciplined, and fragmented out of control to plunder and pillage the countryside around Mortemer. They were attacked suddenly by Normans from Eu and other districts of northeastern Normandy. In the Battle of Mortemer, Guy's younger brother Waleran was mortally wounded, and Guy himself was captured. He spent two years as a prisoner in Normandy, while his uncle, Bishop Guy of Amiens, ruled Ponthieu as regent.

Evidently, from this point on, Count Guy was a vassal of Duke William of Normandy.

=== Harold Godwinson and the Battle of Hastings ===
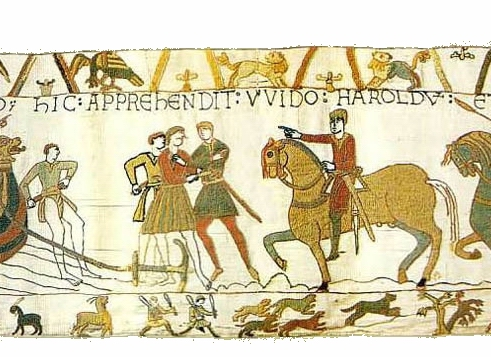
Guy capturing Harold, scene 7 of the Bayeux Tapestry

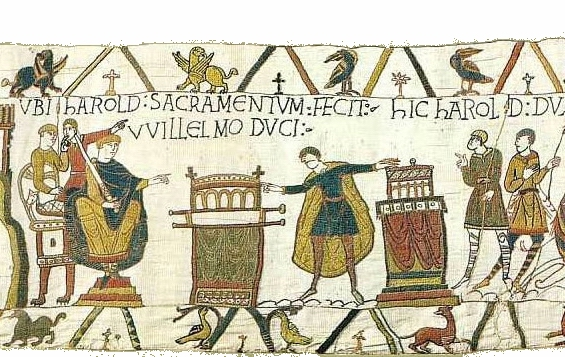
Harold swearing the oath, scene 23 of the Bayeux Tapestry

In 1064, Harold Godwinson, the Earl of Wessex, was shipwrecked on the shores of Ponthieu and captured by Count Guy who took him to his castle of Beaurain on the river Canche, as the Bayeux Tapestry relates: hic apprehendit wido Haroldum et duxit em ad Belrem et ibi eum tenuit ("Here Guy seized Harold and led him to Beaurain and held him there"). Duke William demanded the release of the earl, and Count Guy delivered Harold Godwinson up after being paid a ransom for him. Harold was not released from Normandy until he too had sworn on the Holy Relics to be Duke William's vassal, and to aid him to the throne of England. (This story is pictured prominently in the Bayeux Tapestry where he is called Wido.)

In 1066, Harold accepted the crown of England upon the death of Edward the Confessor, thus precipitating the war that resulted in the Norman Conquest.

According to one interpretation of The Carmen de Hastingae Proelio, Hugh, another of Guy's brothers, was a participant in the Battle of Hastings, and had a hand in the slaying of Harold. Guy I had a son, Enguerrand, who must have died before the Carmen was composed (no later than 1068): when the Carmen refers to Hugh, Guy's brother, as "the noble heir of Ponthieu", we must assume Enguerrand's death as a fact, either at the time of the Conquest, or shortly before.

== Issue ==
Guy married Adela. They had:

- Enguerrand, (d.1060s), predeceased his father.
- Agnes, married Robert of Bellême.
- Matilda

== In popular culture ==
Guy was portrayed by Bernard Hepton in the two-part BBC TV play Conquest (1966), part of the series Theatre 625.

== Sources ==
- Barlow, Frank, ed. (1999). The Carmen de Hastingae Proelio of Guy, Bishop of Amiens (new ed.). Oxford: Clarendon Press. ISBN 0-19-820758-1.
- Douglas, David C. (1964). William the Conqueror: The Norman Impact Upon England. University of California Press.
- Tanner, Heather (2004). Families, Friends and Allies: Boulogne and Politics in Northern France and England, c.879-1160. Brill.
- Thompson, Kathleen (2011). Crouch, David; Thompson, Kathleen (eds.). Being the Ducal Sister: The Role of Adelaide of Aumale. Normandy and its Neighbours 900-1250; Essays for David Bates. Brepols Publishers.
- Van Houts, Elisabeth (2000). The Normans in Europe. Manchester University Press.

Preceded by Enguerrand II	Count of Ponthieu; 1053–1100	Succeeded by Agnes
