= Agnes of Ponthieu =

French noblewoman, c. 1080–c. 1110

Agnes of Ponthieu (c. 1080 – aft. 1105) was ruling Countess of Ponthieu from 1100.

She was the daughter of Count Guy I of Ponthieu and Adela. Enguerrand, her brother, died at a youthful age. Her father, Guy, then made her uncle Hugh heir presumptive, but he also died before Guy (died 1100). Agnes became count Guy's heiress, and was married to Robert of Bellême. Their son William III of Ponthieu succeeded to the county of Ponthieu after the death of Agnes (between 1105 and 1111), and the imprisonment of his father in 1112.

== Sources ==
- Tanner, Heather (2004). Families, Friends and Allies: Boulogne and Politics in Northern France and England, c.879-1160. Brill.

| Preceded by Guy I | Countess of Ponthieu; 1100–1105/1111 | Succeeded by William III |
