= Saint-Riquier Gospels =

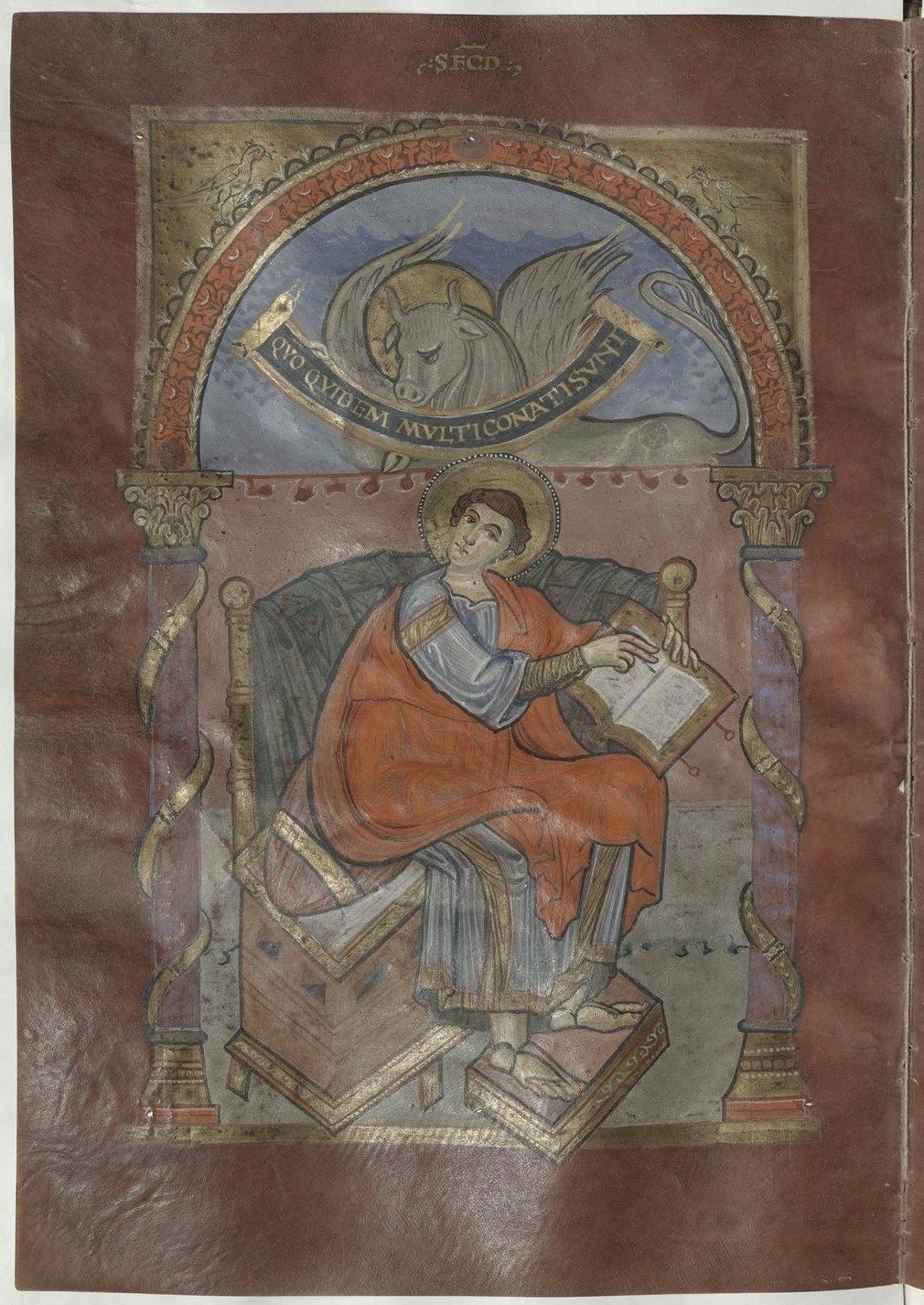
Luke the Evangelist

The St. Riquier Gospels are an illuminated manuscript made during the Carolingian Renaissance around the year 800 but no later than 814. The Gospel Book is a part of the Ada Group of manuscripts.

== Description ==
The manuscript is 198 folios long. It is written on Purple parchment in golden letters. The Gospels and Altar card sections are written in Uncial script (fol. 1–188). The Eusebian Canons are written in Carolingian minuscule (fol. 189–198). The book is illuminated in the Carolingian Style with large decorated initials throughout the text. The design is similar to the Vienna Coronation Gospels. The Portraits of the Evangelists are before Their respective gospel. Matthew (fol. 17^{v}), Mark (fol. 66^{v}), Luke (fol. 101^{v}) and John (fol. 153^{v}).

== History ==
The manuscript was intended as a gift for Angilbert the lay Abbot of Saint-Riquier Abbey and lover of Charlemagne's daughter Bertha. Angilbert donated the Gospel Book together with numerous other manuscripts to the library of his monastery, where it is listed in an inventory catalogue in 831. Today, the manuscript is kept in nearby Abbeville (Bibliothèque Municipale, Ms. 4).

== Gallery ==
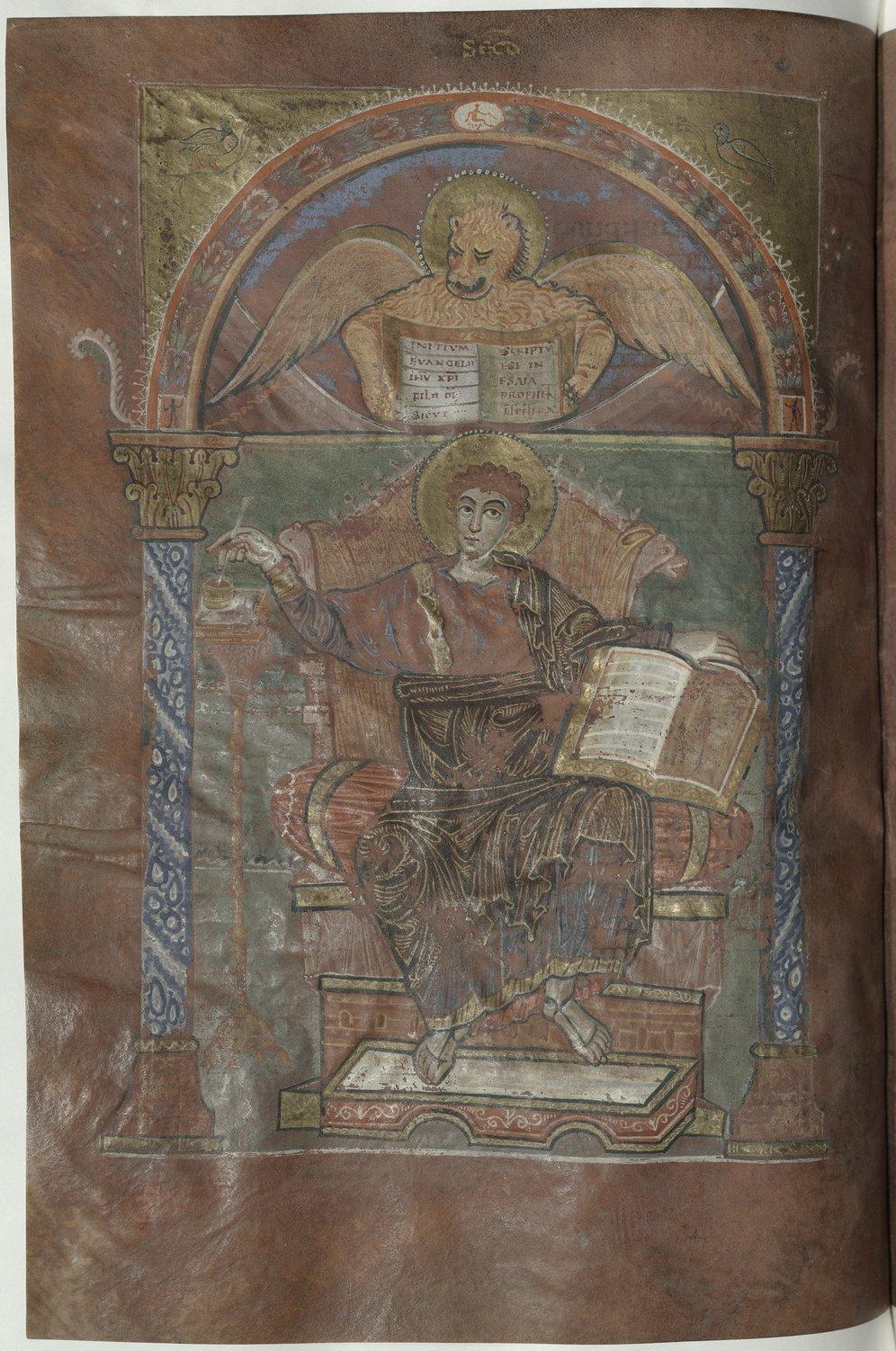
Mark the Evangelist

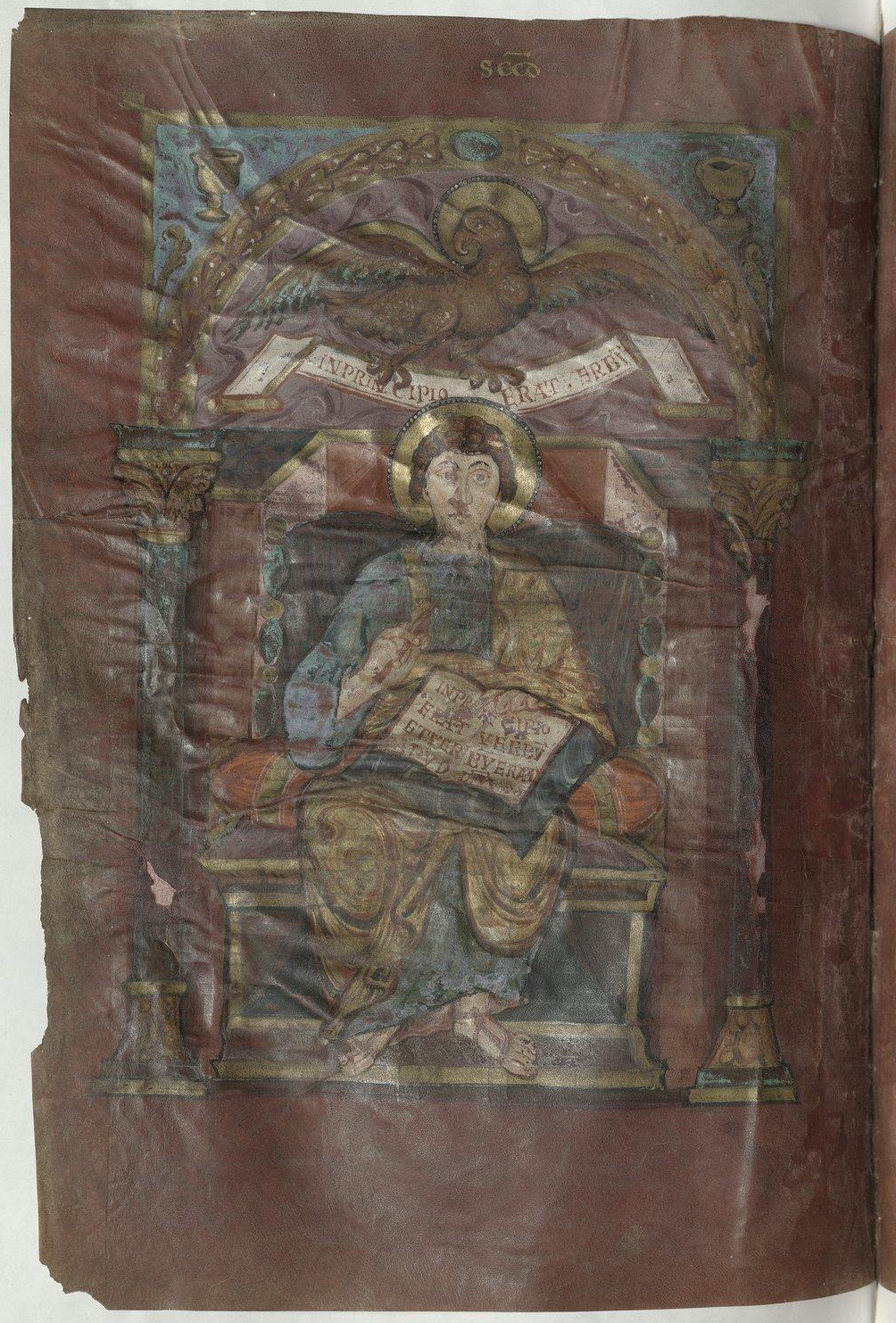
John the Evangelist

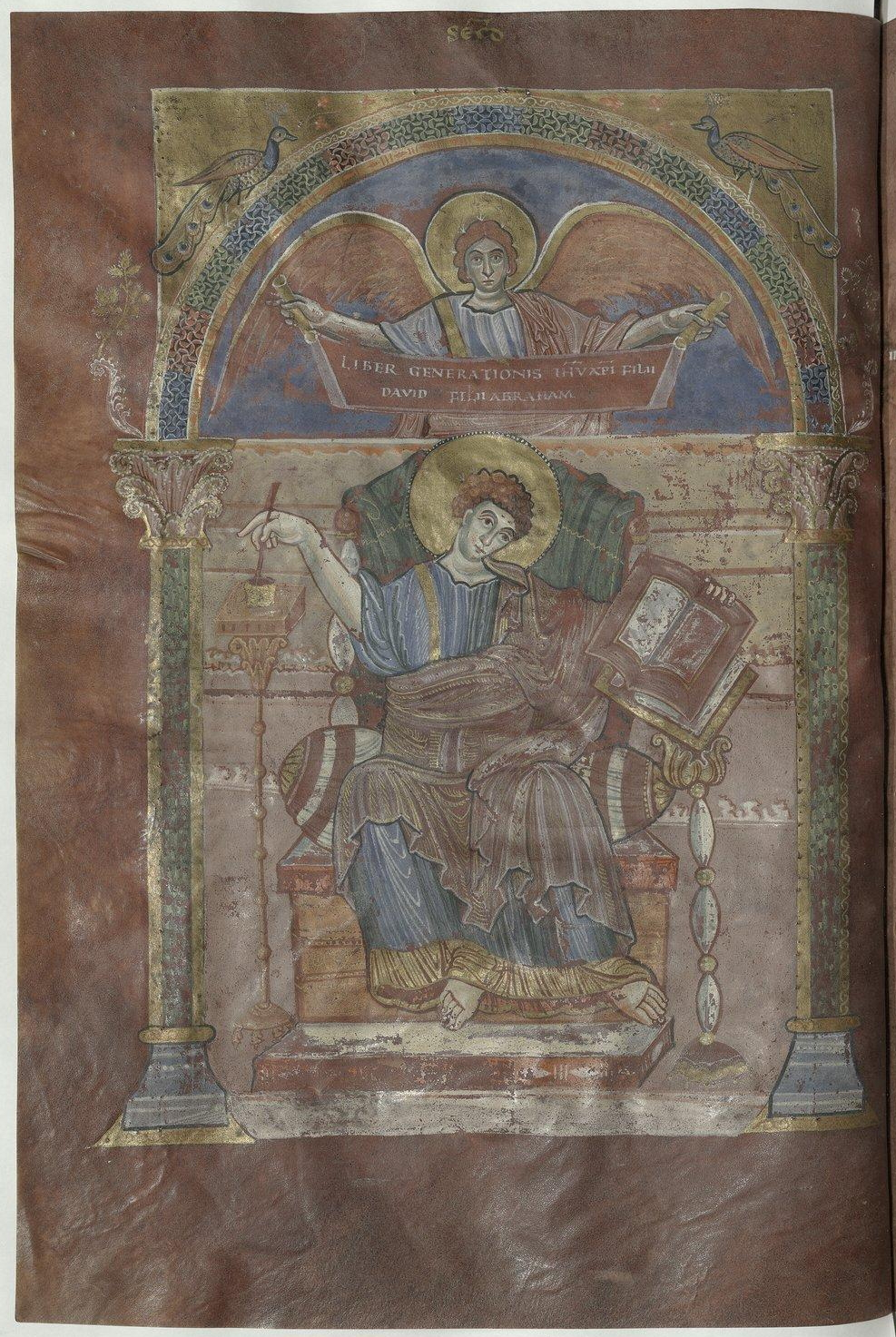
Matthew the Evangelist

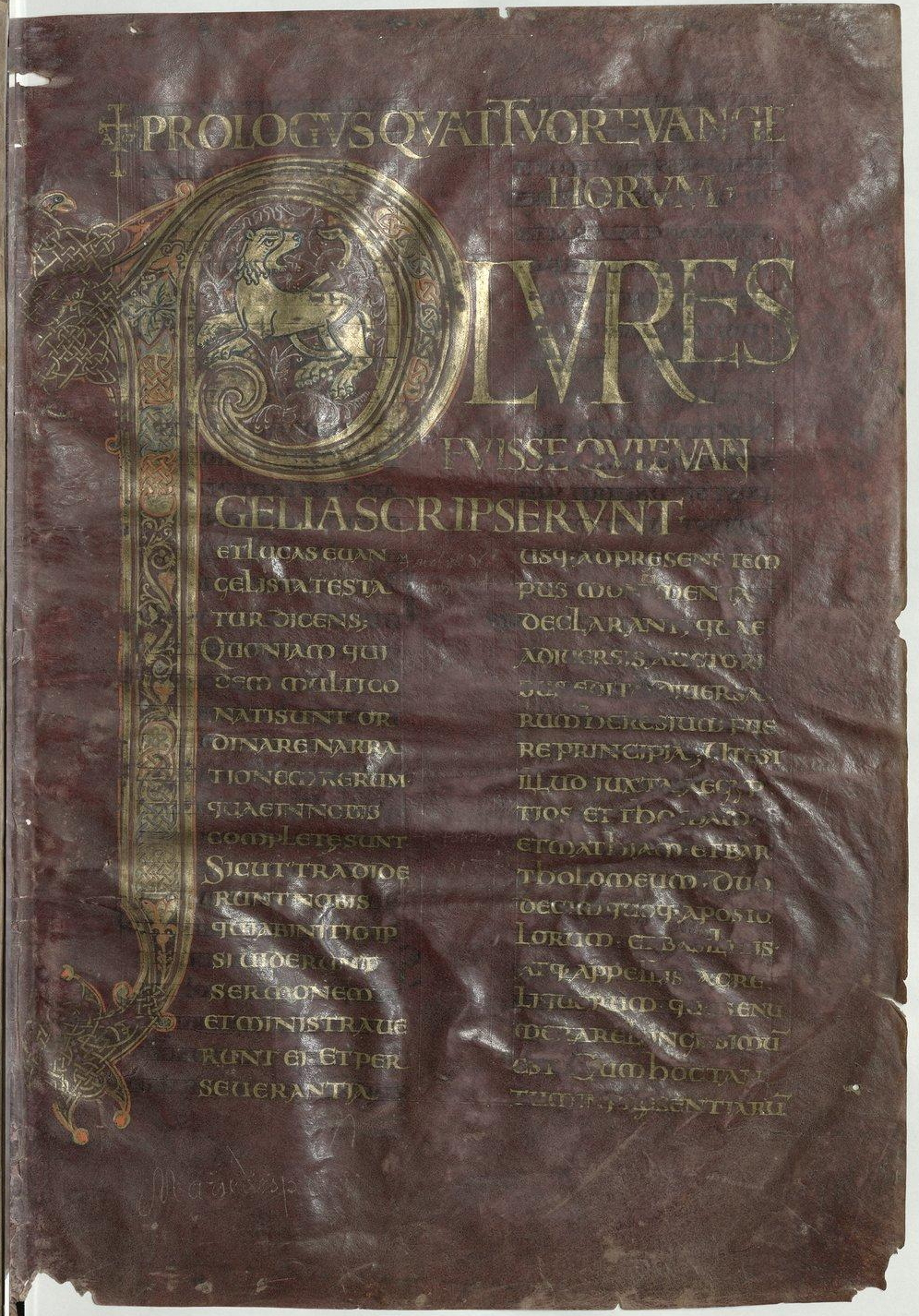
Incipit Example (fol. 1)
