= Guy II of Ponthieu =

- Born: c. 1120
- Died: 25 December 1147; Ephesus
- Noble family: House of Bellême
- Spouse: Ida
- Father: William III of Ponthieu
- Mother: Helie of Burgundy

Guy II of Ponthieu (c. 1120–25 December 1147) was the son of William III of Ponthieu and Helie of Burgundy.

== Life ==
He succeeded his father as Count of Ponthieu before 1129; this was during William's lifetime. Around 1137, he founded the Cistercian Valloires Abbey.

He joined the Second Crusade under King Louis VII of France, and died of a disease on 25 December 1147 in Ephesus.

He was succeeded by his son John I of Ponthieu.

== Marriage and issue ==
His wife was called Ida; he had three children with her:

- John I (d. 1191), Count of Ponthieu
- Guy, (d. between 1208 and 1218), Lord of Noyelles
- Agnes, abbess in Montreuil

== Footnotes ==
Guy II of Ponthieu House of Bellême Born: c. 1120 Died: 1147
French nobility
Preceded by William III	Count of Ponthieu before 1129–1147	Succeeded by John I
