= Carmen de Hastingae Proelio =

11th-century Latin work describing the Norman Conquest of England

The Carmen de Hastingae Proelio (Song of the Battle of Hastings) is a 20th-century name for the Carmen Widonis, the earliest history of the Norman invasion of England from September to December 1066, in Latin. It is attributed to Guy, Bishop of Amiens, a noble of Ponthieu and monastically-trained bishop and administrator close to the French court, who eventually served as a chaplain for Matilda of Flanders, William the Conqueror's queen. Bishop Guy was an uncle to Guy I, Count of Ponthieu, who figures rather prominently in the Bayeux Tapestry as the vassal of Duke William of Normandy who captured Harold Godwinson, later to become King Harold II of England, in 1064.

== History and background ==
The Carmen is generally accepted as the earliest surviving written account of the Norman Conquest. It focuses on the Battle of Hastings and its immediate aftermath, although it also offers insights into navigation, urban administration, the siege of London, and ecclesiastical culture. It is in poetic form, 835 lines of hexameters and elegiac couplets, and is preserved only in two twelfth-century copies from St Eucharius-Matthias in Trier, Bibliothèque royale de Belgique MS 10615-729, folios 227v-230v, and Bibliothèque royale de Belgique MS 9799-809 (the latter containing only the last sixty-six lines).

The Carmen was most likely composed within months of the coronation of William I as king of England (on Christmas Day, 1066) – probably sometime in 1067, possibly as early as Easter of that year, to be performed at the royal festivities in Normandy, where King William I presided. The motivation for the poem's production and performance is open to debate. Queen Matilda may have commissioned the Carmen as an entertainment and to memorialize her husband's conquest, as queens customarily commissioned works of history composed by clerics, and Guy d'Amiens was known in the court of her father, Count Baldwin V of Flanders, where the bishop had witnessed a charter in 1056 with Earl (later King) Harold, Count Guy of Ponthieu, and Count Eustace of Boulogne. This theory is suggested by the work praising the allies from France, Boulogne, Ponthieu, Brittany, Maine, and the new Norman kingdom in Apulia, Calabria and Sicily. All the allies would have attended the Easter celebrations for the sharing-out of war booty. In 1066 Bishop Guy may have sought to win royal esteem, possibly damaged by the involvement of Hugh of Ponthieu in the death of King Harold and the senior family's attempts to assassinate the young duke in childhood. Bishop Guy himself was out of favour with the pope, and it has been suggested that he wanted to garner some Norman influence by writing the Carmen in William's honour and inviting Lanfranc of Pavia, abbot of Abbey of Saint-Étienne, Caen and later Archbishop of Canterbury (to whom the Proem of the poem is dedicated) to use his influence with king and pope. A further possibility (though none of these are mutually exclusive) is that Guy composed the Carmen to present Eustace, Count of Boulogne, in a favourable light in order to reverse King William's banishment of Count Eustace following his failed invasion of England in the autumn of 1067 (Eustace remained in fact out of favour until late in the 1070s).

The Carmen possesses exceptional historical importance as an early account of the Norman Conquest. It is the most vivid of the original written accounts and practically the only one to give a non-Norman point of view in detail. The Bayeux Tapestry is problematic; the identity and purpose of its creators is unknown, though it bears evidence of English involvement (eg. English spelling) in its production. In fact, it is the Carmen's very vividness which has caused it in the past to come under attack as either a forgery, fraud or at the least a later, 12th-century source. Frank Barlow argued that the Carmen was most likely from the year 1067, and following Elisabeth van Houts' arguments in her article "Latin Poetry and the Anglo-Norman Court 1066-1135: The Carmen de Hastingae Proelio," this is the commonly accepted scholarly opinion. The Carmen is notable for literary reasons, too. It describes the Norman Conquest in terms borrowed from classical and Carolingian epic and praise poetry, but in ways that contrast with other contemporary praise poets. The ironic application of classical and Carolingian language to William sows doubt about his faithfulness and piety (two core political values for the Carolingians and the Capetians). This indicates that the contradictions and early weaknesses of William's conquest and regime were already apparent in 1067, even as Guy could praise William for his achievement.

== Editions ==
- Carmen Widonis - The First History of the Norman Conquest, transcription, translation and commentary by Kathleen Tyson, Granularity Press 2018.
- Carmen de Triumpho Normannico - The Song of the Norman Conquest, transcribed from digital images of the manuscript and translated by Kathleen Tyson, Granularity Press 2014.
- The Carmen de Hastingae Proelio of Guy Bishop of Amiens, edited by Catherine Morton and Hope Muntz, Oxford at the Clarendon Press 1972.
- The Carmen de Hastingae Proelio of Guy Bishop of Amiens, edited and translated by Frank Barlow, Clarendon Press 1999.

== Sources ==
- Davis, R. H. C. 1978. 'The Carmen de Hastingae Proelio'. The English Historical Review Vol. 93, No. 367, pp. 241–261 (JSTOR).
- van Houts, Elisabeth. 1989. "Latin Poetry and the Anglo-Norman Court 1066-1135: The Carmen de Hastingae Proelio," Journal of Medieval History 15, pp. 39–62.
- O'Donnell, Thomas. 2017. "The Carmen de Hastingae Proelio and the Poetics of 1067," Anglo-Norman Studies 39, pp. 151–162.
