= Count of Ponthieu =

French county

Coat of arms of the Counts of Ponthieu

The County of Ponthieu (French: Comté de Ponthieu, Latin: Comitatus Pontivi), centered on the mouth of the Somme, became a member of the Norman group of vassal states when Count Guy submitted to William the Conqueror, Duke of Normandy after the battle of Mortemer. It eventually formed part of the dowry of Eleanor of Castile and passed to the English crown. Much fought-over in the Hundred Years' War, it eventually passed to the French royal domain, and the title Count of Ponthieu (comte de Ponthieu) became a courtesy title for the royal family.

== Counts and Countesses of Ponthieu ==
- Helgaud III, also Count of Montreuil. d. 926 in battle against the Normans.
- Herluin II or Herlouin, also Count of Montreuil. (926–945)
- Roger or Rotgaire or Notgard, also Count of Montreuil. (dates unknown)
- William I, also Count of Montreuil. (dates unknown)
- Hildouin, also Count of Montreuil. (dates unknown)
- Hugh I, also Count of Montreuil, d. c. 1000.
- Enguerrand I, also Count of Montreuil (c. 1000 – c. 1045)
- Hugh II, also Lord of Abbeville (c. 1045–1052). Father (by one account) of both Enguerrand II and Guy I.
- Enguerrand II (1052–1053). Married Adelaide II daughter of Robert I Duke of Normandy. Succeeded by his brother Guy I:
- Guy I, (1053–1100) son of Hugh II. Succeeded in Ponthieu by his daughter (and only surviving child):
- Agnes (1100 – bef. 1105) b. c. 1080 in Ponthieu, France; d by 1103 Married c. 1087 Robert of Bellême, 3rd Earl of Shrewsbury and Count of Alençon. Succeeded in Ponthieu by her only child:
- William III Talvas (bef. 1105–20 June 1172), also Count of Alençon. During his lifetime, he ceded Ponthieu to his elder son Guy II; Alençon went to his younger son John I (d February 24, 1191) who was married to Beatrice of Anjou, first cousin of Henry II of England, Count of Anjou.
- Guy II (?–1147). Succeeded by his elder son:
- John I (1147–1191) Succeeded by his son:
- William IV Talvas (1191–1221), also Count of Montreuil. Succeeded by his daughter:
- Mary (1221–1251), also Countess of Montreuil.
  - married Simon of Dammartin (1213 1239) Succeeded by their daughter:
- Joan (1251–1279), also Countess of Montreuil.
  - married Ferdinand III of Castile (1198/1199–1252)
- Eleanor (1279–1290), also Countess of Montreuil.
- Edward II of England (1290–1325), also Count of Montreuil.
- Edward III of England (1325–1336), also Count of Montreuil.
- confiscated by Philip VI of France
- James I, Count of La Marche (1351–1360)
- returned by the Peace of Brétigny
- Edward III of England (1360–1369)
- confiscated again
- Charles VII of France (1403–1422)
- royal domain
- Charles de Valois, Duke of Angoulême (1573–1650)
- Louis Emmanuel de Valois, Duke of Angoulême (1650–1653)
- royal domain
- Charles de Bourbon, Duc de Berry (1710–1714)
- royal domain
- Charles X of France (1830–1836)

== Sources ==
- Bates, David (2016). William the Conqueror. Yale University Press. "..Guy of Ponthieu, the brother and successor of Count Enguerrand II."
- Dunbabin, Jean (2000). France in the Making 843–1180. Oxford University Press. ISBN 0-19-820846-4.
- Musset, Lucien (2005). The Bayeux Tapestry. Boydell Press. "Guy I of Ponthieu is a well-known figure who inherited the county after the death in battle of his brother, Enguerrand II, in 1053."
- Pohl, Benjamin; van Houts, Elisabeth (2022). "History and Memory". In Pohl, Benjamin (ed.). The Cambridge Companion to the Age of William the Conqueror. Cambridge University Press. "..Enguerrand II's brother and successor, Count Guy I (1053–1100), intercepted Harold.."
- Vitalis, Odericus (1853). Delisle, Leopold (ed.). London: Henry Bohn. ISBN 1-154-27527-2. ;
