= John I of Ponthieu =

John I, Count of Ponthieu
- Born: c. 1140
- Died: 1191
- Noble family: House of Bellême
- Spouse: Beatrice of Saint-Pol
- Father: Guy II of Ponthieu
- Mother: Ida

John I of Ponthieu (c. 1140 – 1191) was the son of Guy II of Ponthieu and Ida. He succeeded his father as Count of Ponthieu in 1147.

== War with Normandy ==
John attacked Normandy in 1166 and 1168, in response to King Henry II of England's confiscation of the castles at Alençon, La Roche-Mabile and the Alenconnais. Henry, angry with John's rebellion, led his army on a path of destruction across Vimeu, the south-west part of Ponthieu.

== Family ==
John married Beatrice of Saint-Pol, they had:

- William IV Talvas
- Margaret, married a Picquigny

== Sources ==
- Holt, James Clarke (1985). Magna Carta and Medieval Government. Hambledon Press.
- Parsons, John Carmi (1977). The Court and Household of Eleanor of Castile in 1290. Pontifical Institute of Mediaeval Studies.
- Power, Daniel (2004). The Norman Frontier in the Twelfth and Early Thirteenth Centuries. Cambridge University Press.
- Power, Daniel (2014). "The Preparations of Count John I of Sees for the Third Crusade". In Morton, Nicholas; John, Simon (eds.). Crusading and Warfare in the Middle Ages. Ashgate Publishing Limited.
- Tanner, Heather (2004). Families, Friends and Allies: Boulogne and Politics in Northern France and England, c.879-1160. Brill.

John I of Ponthieu House of Bellême Born: c. 1140 Died: 1191
Preceded by Guy II	Count of Ponthieu; 1147–1191	Succeeded by William IV Talvas
