= Guy (bishop of Amiens) =

11th century bishop

Guy (died 1075) was the bishop of Amiens in the north-east of France and a Latin poet. He composed the Carmen de Hastingae Proelio, a celebration of the Norman victory at the Battle of Hastings in 1066.

== Life ==
Born in 1014, Guy was the son of Enguerrand I, Count of Ponthieu. He was educated for a career in the church at the abbey of Saint-Riquier and was one of its most brilliant students. His teacher was abbot Enguerrand, called "the wise". Guy was an archdeacon by 1045. As the trusted representative of Bishop Fulk II, he was sent in 1049 to the papal curia to place charges against the abbot of Corbie. In 1056, Guy was witness to a charter by Count Baldwin V, Count of Flanders, for St. Peter's at Ghent, also in attendance were Guy's nephew Guy I, Count of Ponthieu, and Roger, Count of Saint-Pol.

Guy succeeded Fulk II as bishop of Amiens in 1058. On May 23, 1059, Bishop Guy went to Reims to witness the crowning of Philip I of France alongside his nephew, Guy I, Count of Ponthieu. When Guy became bishop of Amiens he inherited the ecclesisatical struggles of his predecessor with the abbey of Corbie; this eventually resulted in Guy being suspended by Pope Alexander II from his duties as bishop.

He was in this state of papal disfavour at the time of the Norman Conquest. This may have been the (contributing) reason why bishop Guy composed the Carmen de Hastingae Proelio ("Song of the Battle of Hastings"), as an effort to flatter the new Norman king of England, William I, who was then in very high favor with the pope. But if so, bishop Guy's poem failed in its purpose. In 1067, he gave an endowment to the abbey of Saint-Riquier in Ponthieu, which was witnessed by Count Baldwin VI of Flanders. He was highly enough thought of at the Norman court to be assigned as Matilda of Flanders's chaplain when she went over to England for her coronation in 1068. (Note: Elizabeth Muir Tyler, professor of medieval literature, refers to Guy as Matilda's spiritual advisor.) When Guy died in 1075, he still had not regained his bishopric.

== Sources ==
- Barlow, Frank, ed. (1999). The Carmen de Hastingae Proelio of Guy, Bishop of Amiens. Clarendon Press.
- Barlow, Frank (2004). "Gui (c. 1014–1074/5)". Oxford Dictionary of National Biography (online ed.). Oxford University Press. doi:10.1093/ref:odnb/54419. (Subscription, Wikipedia Library access or UK public library membership required.)
- Tanner, Heather (2004). Families, Friends and Allies: Boulogne and Politics in Northern France and England, c.879-1160. Brill.
- Tyler, Elizabeth Muir (2017). England in Europe, English Royal Women and Literary Patronage, C.1000–c.1150. University of Toronto Press.
- Van Houts, Elisabeth (1999). "Hereward and Flanders". Anglo-Saxon England. 28. Cambridge University Press: 201–223. doi:10.1017/S0263675100002325.
- The Carmen de Hastingae Proelio of Bishop Guy of Amiens, edited by Catherine Morton and Hope Muntz, Oxford at the Clarendon Press, 1972.
