= Ponthieu =

Feudal county in what is now France

Coordinates: 50.11°N 1.83°E

County of Ponthieu: Comte de Ponthieu (French); Pagus Pontivi (Latin); Ponthiu (Picard)
- ~926–1836
- Coat of arms

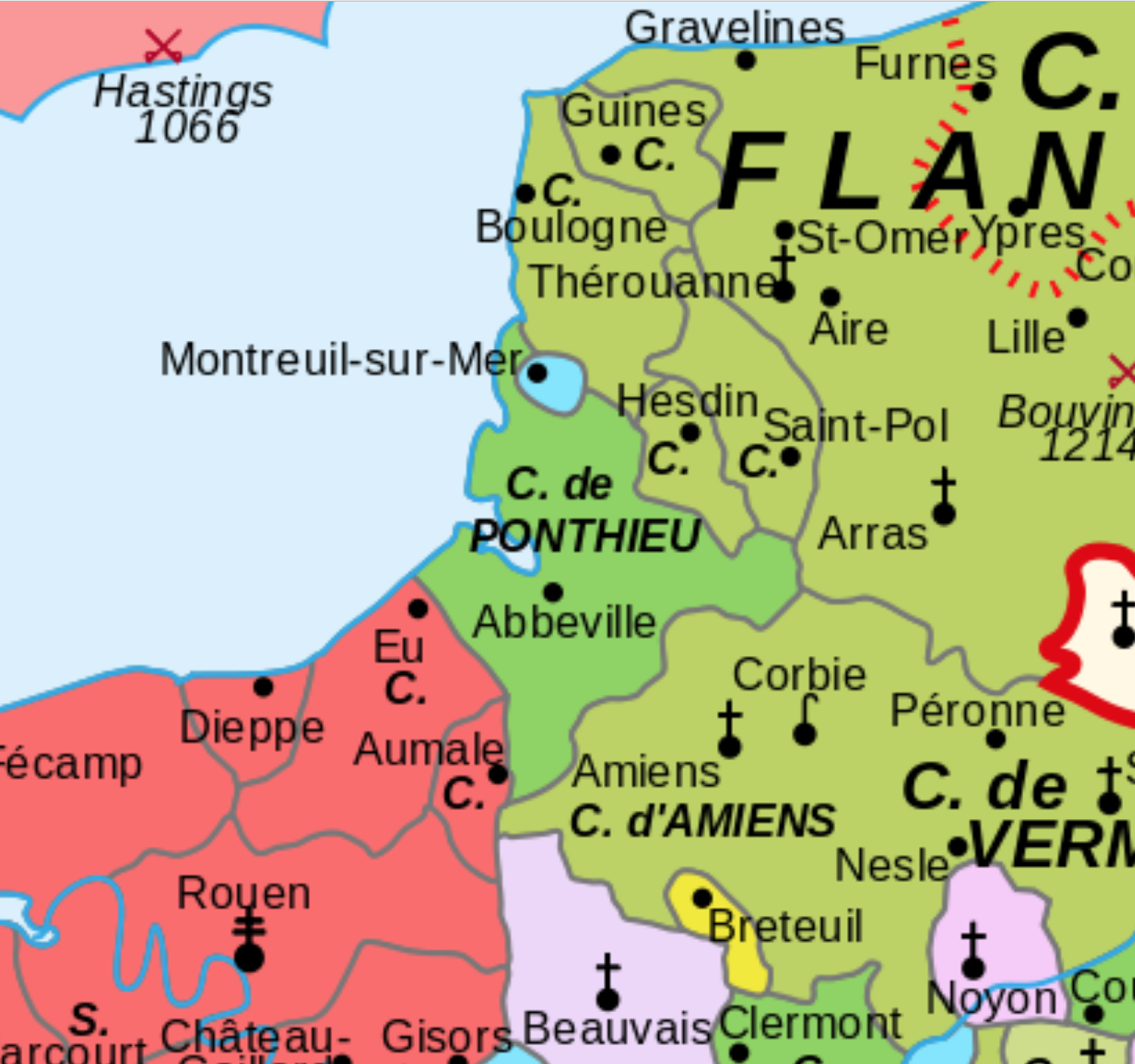
- County of Ponthieu in 1180
- Status: Vassal State of France; (926–1477); Crown Land of France; (1477–1836)
- Capital: Abbeville
- Common languages: Old French; Latin; Picard
- Religion: Catholicism
- Government: County
- Count of Ponthieu
  - ?-926: Helgaud III (first)
- Historical era: Middle Ages
  - First count mentioned: ~926
  - Disestablished: 1836
Preceded by	Succeeded by
West Francia	Kingdom of France
- Today part of: Hauts-de-France

Ponthieu (French pronunciation: [pɔ̃tjø]; Picard: Ponthiu; Latin: Pagus Pontivi) was one of six feudal counties that eventually merged to become part of the Province of Picardy, in northern France. Its chief town is Abbeville.

== History ==
Ponthieu played a small but important role in the politics that led up to the Norman invasion of England in 1066.

=== Norman conquest of England ===
In 1064 Edward the Confessor sent Harold Godwinson to Normandy in order to recognize its duke William as his successor. However, Harold shipwrecked at Ponthieu, where he was taken captive by Guy I (or Wido according to the Bayeux Tapestry), the then Count of Ponthieu. It is alleged that William (Duke of Normandy, later William I of England), discovering that Harold had been taken captive, persuaded Count Guy to hand over his prisoner. According to the Normans Harold then swore to support William's claim to the throne, and joined the duke in his brief campaign in Brittany before returning to England.

In 1067 the chaplain of Matilda of Flanders, Guy, Bishop of Amiens, composed Carmen de Hastingae Proelio, a Latin poem on the battle of Hastings.

In 1150 the Count of Ponthieu built a fortress for himself at Crotoy, a strategic point on the mouth of the river Somme.

=== House of Castile ===
In 1279 Eleanor of Castile, wife of King Edward I of England inherited the County of Ponthieu. Eleanor was the daughter of Joan Countess of Ponthieu. Upon her death in 1290 Ponthieu passed to her son Edward II of England. As Edward was a boy of six Ponthieu was granted to Edmund Crouchback the king’s brother until young Edward came of age. However in 1294 Ponthieu was confiscated by King Philip IV of France. Upon the end of the Gascon War of 1294-1303 it reverted back to Edward.

=== The Hundred Years' War ===
During the Hundred Years' War, Ponthieu changed hands a number of times, although the English claimed control of it from 1279–1369, and then later until 1435. During English control of Ponthieu, Abbeville was used as the capital. In late August 1346, during his campaigns on French soil, Edward III of England reached the region of Ponthieu. While there, he restored the fortress at Crotoy that had been ruined. He forced a passage of the Somme at the ford of Blanchetaque. The army led by Philip VI of France caught up with him at nearby Crécy-en-Ponthieu, leading to the famous Battle of Crécy.

In 1360, the Treaty of Brétigny between King John II of France and Edward III of England gave control of Ponthieu (along with Gascony and Calais) over to the English, in exchange for Edward relinquishing his claim to the French throne. Edward took the land but still refused to surrender his claim.

In April, 1369 Charles V of France conquered Ponthieu, and a month later declared war on England (he had done so previously in 1368 as well). As a result, Edward publicly reassumed the title 'King of France' in June.

In 1372 an English army under the leadership of Robert Knolles invaded Ponthieu, burning the city of Le Crotoy before crossing the Somme at the ford of Blanchetaque.

Also during the Hundred Years' War, in the Treaty of Arras (1435), Charles VII of France bribed Philip the Good, Duke of Burgundy, to break his alliance with the English in exchange for possession of Ponthieu. This arguably marked a turning point that led to the end of England's part in the conflict 40 years later.

In 1477 Ponthieu was reconquered by King Louis XI of France.

== Cultural references ==
Renaissance Ponthieu, specifically Abbeville, is the setting for the 1993 film The Hour of the Pig, which was released in the US as The Advocate and stars Colin Firth. Part of the action turns on the difference in the Renaissance era between the customary law of Ponthieu and that of the remainder of France.
