= 1040s =

Decade

The 1040s was a decade of the Julian Calendar which began on January 1, 1040, and ended on December 31, 1049.

== Events ==
=== By place ===
==== Europe ====
- Spring – Nikephoros Dokeianos, Byzantine governor of the Catepanate of Italy, is murdered by Lombard rebels at Ascoli. He is replaced by Michael Dokeianos, who arrives in November with a Varangian army.
- August 22–23 – Battle at Brůdek: Duke Bretislav I of Bohemia defeats the German forces under King Henry III ("the Black") in the Bohemian Forest.
- Peter Delyan leads a rebellion against the Byzantine Empire and is proclaimed by the Bulgarian nobles as emperor (tsar) Peter II in Belgrade.
- The Emirate of Sicily is divided and fragmented into small fiefdoms. The Arab nobles of Palermo restore the regime of the Kalbids (approximate date).

==== Britain ====
- March 17 – King Harold Harefoot dies at Oxford at the age of 24. His illegitimate son Ælfwine Haroldsson is left in the care of his grandmother, Ælfgifu of Northampton.
- June 17 – Harthacnut lands at Sandwich and reclaims the throne of England which had been taken by Harald Harefoot in 1035.
- August 14 – King Duncan is killed in battle against his first cousin and rival Macbeth, who succeeds him as king of Scotland.

==== Islamic world ====
- May 23 – Battle of Dandanaqan: The Turkmen Seljuqs defeat the Ghaznavid forces (50,000 men) led by Sultan Mas'ud I at Dandanaqan, a fortress city in the desert near Merv. Ghaznavid commanders Ali Daya and Begtoghdi are blamed for the defeat and executed.

=== By topic ===
==== Religion ====
- Weihenstephan Abbey (Kloster Weihenstephan) in Germany, founds the oldest operating brewery.
- The Shalu Monastery is founded by the Buddhist monk Chetsun Sherab Jungnay in Tibet.

=== By place ===
==== Byzantine Empire ====
- December 10 – Emperor Michael IV the Paphlagonian dies after a 6-year reign. His wife, Empress Zoë, elevates (on the advice of her lover John the Orphanotrophos) her adoptive son to the throne of the Byzantine Empire, as Michael V Kalaphates. Shortly after, Michael comes into conflict with his uncle John, and banishes him to a monastery.

==== Europe ====
- March 17 – Battle of Olivento: Norman troops and their Lombard allies, led by William Iron Arm, are victorious against the Byzantines at the feet of the Monte Vulture, near the River Olivento in Apulia.
- May 4 – Battle of Montemaggiore: Lombard-Norman rebel forces, led by William, are again victorious, and defeat a Byzantine army (18,000 men) on the hill of Montemaggiore, near the River Ofanto.
- September 3 – Battle of Montepeloso: Lombard-Norman rebel forces, led by William, defeat the Byzantines at Montepeloso. During the battle, Boioannes, governor of the Catepanate of Italy, is captured.
- September – Peter, King of Hungary is deposed by a palace coup. The Hungarian magnates elect Samuel Aba as their king.
- Winter – Battle of Ostrovo: The Byzantines, with the help of the Varangian Guard, led by Harald Hardrada (future king of Norway), defeat the Bulgarian troops, near Lake Ostrovo in Greece.

==== England ====
- King Harthacnut invites his half-brother Edward the Confessor to return to England from exile in Normandy as his heir as king of England, with the support of Godwin, Earl of Wessex.
- The city of Worcester rebels against the naval taxes of Harthacnut. He reduces the navy from 60 to 32 ships.

==== Africa ====
- The Zirid dynasty rejects Shi'ite obedience and Fatimid domination, and recognizes the Abbasids as their overlords.

==== Asia ====
- At about this time, the number of enlisted soldiers in the Song dynasty Chinese military reaches well over 1,250,000 troops, an increase since 1022, when there were a million soldiers.

=== By place ===
==== Byzantine Empire ====
- April 19 – Emperor Michael V Kalaphates banishes his adoptive mother and co-ruler Zoë, for plotting to poison him, to the island of Principo. His announcement as sole emperor leads to a popular revolt.
- April 20 – Zoë is proclaimed as empress at an assembly in Hagia Sophia, along with her sister Theodora, as co-ruler. Michael V flees to the monastery of Stoudios, but is arrested, blinded and castrated.
- Zoë recalls Synodianos, governor of the Catepanate of Italy, and replaces him with George Maniakes (the disgraced head of the Sicilian campaign). All of Apulia is in the hands of the Lombard rebels.
- June 11 – Zoë marries her third husband, a Byzantine bureaucrat who ascends as co-emperor Constantine IX at Constantinople. Theodora agrees to surrender her co-emperorship.
- Summer – George Maniakes goes on a march through Apulia, plundering the towns that have declared for the Lombard rebels. Constantine IX recalls Maniakes to Constantinople.
- George Maniakes revolts against Constantine IX and is declared emperor by his troops. He captures Pardos who has landed with an army at Otranto to take over his command.
- Byzantine–Arab War: The Byzantines reconquer the fortress city of Edessa (modern Turkey), returning it to Christian hands, after 400 years of Islamic rule (approximate date).
- Duklja secures its independence from the Byzantine Empire.

==== Europe ====
- January 25 – Abbad I dies after a 19-year reign as independent ruler of the Taifa of Seville in Al-Andalus (modern Spain). He is succeeded by his son Abbad II (until 1069).
- Casimir I, duke of Poland, succeeds in reuniting the realm which earns him the name "the Restorer". He signs a treaty with Bretislav I, duke of Bohemia, at Regensburg.
- June 8 – Magnus the Good becomes king of Denmark after the death of Harthacnut. Despite a claim to the throne by Sweyn II, Magnus takes control of Denmark.
- Autumn – Norman mercenaries assemble at Matera and decide to elect William Iron Arm as count of Melfi and leader of the Normans in Southern Italy.
- Harald Hardrada, leader of the Varangian Guard in the Byzantine Empire, returns to Norway, possibly because of his involvement in Maniakes' revolt.
- Finnish–Novgorodian War: Grand Prince Vladimir Yaroslavich wages a campaign against the Tavastians (yem).

==== England ====
- June 8 – King Harthacnut collapses and dies while attending a party. His half-brother Edward the Confessor becomes king of England.

==== Islamic world ====
- The Almoravids, led by Abdallah ibn Yasin, invade Morocco (approximate date).

=== By place ===
==== Byzantine Empire ====
- Spring – Emperor Constantine IX Monomachos sends a Byzantine expeditionary force to the Balkans against the rebellious George Maniakes, governor of the Catepanate of Italy. The two armies meet near Thessaloniki in northern Greece. The rebel army – better organized, seasoned and with superior leadership – is initially successful, but Maniakes is killed by an arrow at the moment of his triumph. After this, his army is routed.
- Rus'–Byzantine War: A Kievan Rus' naval raid, led by Grand Prince Vladimir Yaraslavich, unsuccessfully attacks Constantinople. A 6,000-strong Kievan contingent under Vyshata is also defeated and deported to the capital.

==== Europe ====
- Spring – A grand assembly at Melfi, with all the Norman and Lombard nobles acclaim Guaimar IV, duke of Apulia and Calabria. The territories are divided into 12 fiefdoms and distributed among Norman chieftains. William Iron Arm is granted Ascoli as a private fiefdom and his brother Drogo of Hauteville is granted Venosa. Count Rainulf II of Aversa, not present at the assembly, receives Siponto and recognizes Guaimar's suzerainty.
- Grand Prince Yaroslav the Wise of Kiev makes an agreement with Duke Casimir I the Restorer of Poland that recognizes Chervyen as part of Kiev. The agreement is sealed with a double marriage – Casimir to Maria Dobroniega (a daughter of Vladimir the Great), and Iziaslav to Gertrude, Casimir's sister.
- November 21 – King Henry III ("the Black") marries Agnes of Poitou (daughter of William V of Aquitaine) at the Imperial Palace at Ingelheim am Rhein. She is his second wife after the death of Gunhilda from malaria in 1038.

==== England ====
- April 3 – Edward the Confessor is crowned king of England at Winchester Cathedral. He learns that his mother, Queen Emma of Normandy is plotting with Magnus the Good to take control of the English throne. Edward strips her land and treasure, but she is allowed to stay in England.

==== Arabian Empire ====
- The Seljuqs under Tughril Beg expel the Oghuz Turks from Khorasan and conquer Qazvin (modern Iran). They become the new masters of the Ziyarid dynasty (approximate date).

==== Africa ====
- The first king of the Kingdom of Nri, Eze Nri Ìfikuánim, is installed in West Africa.

==== Asia ====
- In China, the statesmen Ouyang Xiu and Fan Zhongyan put forth the Qingli Reforms during the Song dynasty, which are halted by 1045.

=== By place ===
==== Europe ====
- July 6 – Battle of Ménfő: German troops under King Henry III ("the Black") defeat the Hungarian army, led by King Samuel Aba, who flees the field but is captured and killed. Peter Orseolo ("the Venetian") becomes (for the second time) king of Hungary, and a vassal of the Holy Roman Empire.
- Summer – Geoffrey II ("the Hammer"), count of Anjou, captures the city of Tours, and takes control of the county of Touraine.

==== Asia ====
- The Chinese military treatise of the Wujing Zongyao is written and compiled by scholars Zeng Gongliang (曾公亮), Ding Du (丁度), and Yang Weide (楊惟德), during the Song dynasty. It is the first book in history to include formulas for gunpowder, and its use for various bombs (thrown by sling or trebuchet catapult). It also describes the double-piston pump flamethrower and a thermoremanence compass, a few decades before Shen Kuo wrote of the first known magnetic mariner's compass. Although emphasizing the importance of many weapons, it reserves high respect for the crossbow, and the ability of crossbowmen to fell charging units of nomadic cavalrymen.
- August 11 – King Anawrahta seizes the throne of the Pagan Empire at Bagan in Burma (modern Myanmar).

=== By topic ===
==== Religion ====
- September – A second Roman uprising forces Pope Benedict IX out of Rome. He is succeeded by the new elected (anti)-Pope Sylvester III (until 1045).

=== 1045 ===
- January 20 – Pope Sylvester III becomes the 146th pope, succeeding Benedict IX, who abdicated during the previous year.
- January 23 – Edward the Confessor, King of England, marries Edith of Wessex (daughter of Earl Godwin) and she is crowned queen consort at Winchester. This year also in England, Edward begins construction of Westminster Abbey.
- February – Pope Sylvester III is deposed (election deemed invalid); Pope Benedict IX is elected once more, becoming the 147th pope.
- February 5 – Emperor Go-Reizei ascends the throne of Japan.
- May 5 – Pope Gregory VI becomes the 148th pope, following the resignation of Pope Benedict IX in exchange for money. There are growing allegations that simony is taking place during Gregory VI's reign.
- Movable type printing is invented by Bi Sheng in China.
- The Qingli Reforms, put forth by the Chinese statesman Fan Zhongyan in 1043, are halted by their conservative ministerial peers, but will later influence reform efforts under Wang Anshi.
- The Bagratid Kingdom of Armenia is surrendered to the Eastern Roman Empire, ending the Kingdom.
- Harald Hardrada returns to Scandinavia through Sigtuna in Sweden, after escaping from the Byzantine Empire with a fortune.

=== By place ===
==== Europe ====
- Autumn – King Henry III ("the Black") travels to Italy to secure the imposition of Guido da Velate, archbishop of Milan, and other similarly loyal candidates in other sees (like Ravenna, Verona and Modena).
- Vata pagan uprising in the Kingdom of Hungary: Peter, King of Hungary ("the Venetian"), is overthrown after a 2-year reign and perhaps executed. Bishops Gerard of Csanád and Bystrík (or Bestricus) are stoned to death in Budapest.

==== Britain ====
- Ealdred, bishop of Worcester, leads troops from England on an unsuccessful punitive raid against the Welsh leaders Gruffydd ap Rhydderch, Rhys ap Rhydderch and Gruffydd ap Llywelyn.

==== Asia ====
- Bao Zheng (Lord Bao), a Chinese government officer during the reign of Emperor Renzong of Song, writes a memorial to the throne. He warns about governmental corruption – and a foreseeable bankruptcy of the Chinese iron industry – if increasingly poorer families continued to be listed on the register for iron-smelting households (while rich households avoid being listed for fear of financial calamity). Apparently the government heeds the warning, and produces more iron products by the year 1078 than China ever had before.
- Munjong is crowned the 11th king of Goryeo (Korea).

=== By topic ===
==== Exploration ====
- March 5 – Nasir Khusraw begins his 7-year Middle Eastern (19,000-kilometre) journey, which he later describes in the book Safarnāmé.

==== Religion ====
- Summer – Ex-Pope Benedict IX gives up a renewed attempt to reclaim the papal throne in Rome; Sylvester III reasserts his claim.
- December 20 – Pope Gregory VI is accused of simony at the Council of Sutri, and abdicates as pope of the Catholic Church.
- December 25 – Pope Clement II succeeds Gregory VI as the 149th pope, and crowns Henry III as Holy Roman Emperor.
- Hildesheim Cathedral (Germany) is largely destroyed by fire.

=== By place ===
==== Byzantine Empire ====
- September 25–28 – Rebel general Leo Tornikios (a nephew of Emperor Constantine IX) proclaims himself emperor at Adrianople, and besieges Constantinople. Byzantine troops personally led by Constantine repel him, and re-occupy the walls. Tornikios is forced to withdraw, while his followers start to abandon him. Finally, he is captured at a church in Boulgarophygon (modern Turkey), and is publicly blinded.
- Winter – Constantine IX allows the Pecheneg tribes to cross the Danube and settle permanently in Byzantine territory. He buys their alliance with presents, using them to attack his enemies (Bulgars and Magyars) in the rear, and so to prevent any southward advance of the Kievan Rus'.

==== Europe ====
- Spring – Henry III, Holy Roman Emperor ("the Black") travels to southern Italy, and deprives Guaimar IV of his title Duke of Apulia and Calabria. He receives homage from Drogo of Hauteville, who becomes "Duke and Master of all Italy".
- August 10 – Battle of Val-ès-Dunes: Norman duke William I secures control over Normandy with assistance from King Henry I of France by defeating rebel Norman barons at Caen. Later in October, William promulgates the "Truce of God" throughout his duchy.
- October 25 – Harald Hardrada becomes sole king of Norway on the death of his nephew and co-regent Magnus I ("the Good"). The crown of Denmark passes to Sweyn II.

=== By topic ===
==== Religion ====
- October 9 – Pope Clement II dies suddenly after a 9-month pontificate. Benedict IX usurps the papal throne as the 150th pope of the Catholic Church (his third time in the office).
- November – Benedict IX, with support of Boniface III, Margrave of Tuscany, seizes the Lateran Palace in Rome.

=== By place ===
==== Byzantine Empire ====
- September 18 – Battle of Kapetron: A combined Byzantine-Georgian army, under Byzantine generals Aaronios and Katakalon Kekaumenos (supported by the Georgian duke Liparit IV), confronts the invading Seljuk Turks, led by Ibrahim Inal (a half-brother of Sultan Tughril), at Kapetron (near modern-day Pasinler). The Byzantines defeat their opposing Turkish forces in the flanks, but in the centre Ibrahim Inal captures Liparit, and can safely withdraw from Byzantine territory, laden with spoils and captives, including Liparit.
- Winter – Emperor Constantine IX sends an embassy with gifts and a ransom, to release Liparit IV to Tughril. However, the sultan sets Liparit free, on the condition that he will never again fight the Seljuks.

==== Europe ====
- Winter – Henry III, Holy Roman Emperor appoints his cousin, Bishop Bruno of Toul (related to the counts of Egisheim-Dagsburg in Upper Alsace) as successor of Damasus II at an assembly at Worms.
- The city of Oslo is founded by King Harald Hardrada of Norway (approximate date).

==== England ====
- 1048 or 1066 – End of the Viking Age: Vikings make an unsuccessful raid on the Kingdom of England; The raiders flee to Flanders (modern Belgium).
- King Edward the Confessor goes to war against Flanders, blockading the English Channel with a fleet based at Sandwich, Kent.

==== China ====
- Catastrophic Yellow River flood in Northern Song China; the river changes its course until 1194.

=== By topic ===
==== Religion ====
- July 16 – At orders of Henry III, German troops under Boniface III, Margrave of Tuscany ("of Canossa"), enter Rome and expel Pope Benedict IX.
- July 17 – Pope Damasus II succeeds Benedict IX as the 151st pope of the Catholic Church, but dies after 23 days.
- December – Bruno von Egisheim-Dagsburg, bishop of Toul, is selected as the new pope by an assembly at Worms - after canonical election in Rome next February, he assumes the name Pope Leo IX.

=== By place ===
==== Byzantine Empire ====
- Spring – Pecheneg Revolt: Emperor Constantine IX decides to transfer 15,000 Pecheneg warriors from their positions in the Balkans to the eastern front. Upon approaching the Bosporus, the Pechenegs decide to turn back, and march through Bulgaria, until they reach the Byzantine city of Serdia. Later, joined by followers, the Pecheneg tribes raise the banner of revolt in Thrace.

==== Europe ====
- January 13 – Theodwin, prince-bishop of Liège, defeats Count Dirk IV of West Frisia near Dordrecht and restores imperial authority in the Rhine Delta.
- The Republic of Pisa successfully completes the conquest of Sardinia, from the Andalusian occupiers. ^{[Dubious claim; since Sardinia was already governed by the Giudici by this time]}

==== British Isles ====
- Viking Irish raiders ally with King Gruffydd ap Rhydderch of Gwent in raiding along the River Severn.

==== Africa ====
- The Banu Hilal, a confederation of tribes of Arabia, begin their invasion in the Maghreb (North Africa). They are organized by the Egyptian Fatimid Caliphate to punish their former Zirid vassals.

==== Asia ====
- The Iron Pagoda in Kaifeng is constructed, during the Chinese Song dynasty.

=== By topic ===
==== Religion ====
- February 12 – Pope Leo IX succeeds Damasus II, as the 152nd pope of the Catholic Church. He goes on a one-year trip to promote the cause of the reformist program among the European prelates.

== Significant people ==
- Macbeth, King of Scotland (d. 1057)
- Godwin, Earl of Wessex (d. 1053)
- El Cid (b. 1040)
- Yaroslav the Wise
- Al-Qa'im (caliph of Baghdad)

== Births ==
1040

- February 22 – Rashi, French rabbi and writer (d. 1105)
- July 12 – Yun Kwan, Korean general (d. 1111)
- Adelaide of Hungary, duchess of Bohemia (d. 1062)
- Alan Rufus, Norman nobleman (approximate date)
- Alfonso VI, king of León and Castile (approximate date)
- Al-Mu'tamid ibn Abbad, Abbadid emir of Seville (d. 1095) (approximate date)
- Arnold of Soissons, French bishop (approximate date)
- Blessed Gerard, founder of the Knights Hospitaller (d. 1120) (approximate date)
- Bonfilius, bishop of Foligno (approximate date)
- Conrad I, count of Luxembourg (approximate date)
- Ernulf, French Benedictine monk and bishop (d. 1124)
- Gebhard III, bishop of Constance (approximate date)
- Geoffrey III, Count of Anjou, French nobleman (approximate date)
- Géza I (Magnus), king of Hungary (approximate date)
- Guérin of Aumale, Founder of House of Aumale (d. 1100)
- Guglielmo Embriaco, Genoese merchant (d. 1102) (approximate date)
- Haziga of Diessen, German countess (approximate date)
- Harald III, king of Denmark (approximate date)
- Herman I, margrave of Baden (approximate date)
- Hugh I, French nobleman (approximate date)
- Hugh of Die, French bishop (approximate date)
- Ibn Aqil, Persian theologian and jurist (d. 1119) (approximate date)
- Ida of Lorraine, French countess (approximate date)
- Ivo of Chartres, French bishop (approximate date)
- Ladislaus I, king of Hungary (approximate date)
- Oddone Frangipane, Italian monk and hermit (d. 1127)
- Odo I of Furneaux (or Eudes), French nobleman (d. 1086)
- Roger I of Sicily, Norman nobleman (approximate date)
- Sikelgaita, Lombard duchess of Apulia (d. 1090)
- Wulfnoth Godwinson, English nobleman (d. 1094)
- Xiao Guanyin, Chinese empress consort of the Liao dynasty (d. 1075)
- Zayn al-Din Gorgani, Persian physician (d. 1136) (approximate date)

1041

- Ōe no Masafusa, Japanese poet (d. 1111)
- Raymond IV, Count of Toulouse (Raymond of Saint-Gilles), French nobleman (d. 1105) (approximate date)

1042

- Bolesław II the Generous, king of Poland (approximate date)
- Canute IV ("the Holy"), king of Denmark (approximate date)
- Fujiwara no Morozane, Japanese nobleman and regent (d. 1101)
- Gissur Ísleifsson, Icelandic clergyman and bishop (d. 1118)
- Johannes of Jerusalem, French monk and abbot (d. 1119)
- Louis the Springer, German nobleman (d. 1123)
- Minamoto no Yoshitsuna, Japanese samurai (d. 1134)
- Sancho V, king of Aragon and Pamplona (d. 1094)

1043

- Abu Muhammad al-Baghawi, Persian hadith scholar (d. 1122)
- Áurea of San Millán, Spanish anchorite and saint (d. 1070)
- Fulk IV ("the Quarreller"), French nobleman (d. 1109)
- Furong Daokai, Chinese Zen Buddhist monk (d. 1118)
- Isaac ben Reuben Albargeloni, Spanish Jewish rabbi
- El Cid (Rodrigo Diaz de Vivar), Spanish nobleman (d. 1099)

1044

- Trahaearn ap Caradog, Welsh king of Gwynedd (d. 1081)
- Approximate date
  - Abelard of Hauteville, Italo-Norman nobleman (d. 1081)
  - Władysław I Herman, duke of Poland (d. 1102)

1045

- Huang Tingjian, famous Chinese calligrapher, painter and poet (d. 1105)
- Approximate date
  - Margaret, queen consort of Scotland (d. 1093)
  - Robert of Arbrissel (d. 1116), Bretonic preacher and founder of Fontevraud Abbey
  - Stephen, Count of Blois (d. 1102)

1046

- May 8 – Constance of Burgundy, queen consort of Castile and León (d. 1093)
- Afridun I ("the Martyr"), ruler (shah) of Shirvan (d. 1120)
- Bernard of Thiron, founder of the Tironensian Order (d. 1117)
- Ingegerd, queen of Denmark and Sweden (approximate date)
- Leo of Ostia ("Marsicanus"), Italian cardinal (d. 1115)
- Masud Sa'd Salman, Persian poet and writer (d. 1121)
- Matilda, margravine of Tuscany (d. 1115) (approximate date)

1047

- December 28 – Sunjong, ruler of Goryeo (d. 1083)
- Cai Jing, Chinese official and calligrapher (d. 1126)
- Qingshui, Chinese Chan Buddhist monk (d. 1101)
- Xiang, Chinese empress regent of the Song dynasty (d. 1102)
- Yizong, Chinese emperor of Western Xia (d. 1068)
- Approximate date
  - Hugh d'Avranches, Norman nobleman (d. 1101)
  - Simon de Crépy, French nobleman
  - Wyszesława of Kiev, duchess of Poland

1048

- May 18 – Omar Khayyam, Persian mathematician and poet (d. 1131)
- May 25 – Shenzong, emperor of the Song dynasty (d. 1085)
- October – Matilda of Germany, duchess of Swabia (d. 1060)
- Arwa al-Sulayhi, queen and co-ruler of Yemen (d. 1138)
- Domnall Ua Lochlainn, High King of Ireland (d. 1121)
- Harding of Bristol, English sheriff reeve (approximate date)
- Magnus II (Haraldsson), king of Norway (approximate date)
- Peter I, Italian nobleman (House of Savoy) (d. 1078) (approximate date)
- Sheikh Ahmad-e Jami, Persian Sufi writer and poet (d. 1141)
- Turgot of Durham, Scottish bishop (approximate date)

1049

- October 9 – Seonjong, king of Goryeo (d. 1094)
- Godelieve, Flemish saint (approximate date)
- Hermann II, count palatine of Lotharingia (d. 1085)
- John Theristus, Italian Benedictine monk (d. 1129)
- Li Gonglin, Chinese painter and antiquarian (d. 1106)
- Peter de Honestis, Italian monk (approximate date)
- Saw Lu, king of the Pagan Kingdom (d. 1084)
- Rhiryd ap Bleddyn, king of Powys (d. 1088)

== Deaths ==
1040

- January 17 – Mas'ud I, Ghaznavid sultan (b. 998)
- March 3 – Cunigunde, Holy Roman Empress
- March 17 – Harold Harefoot, king of England
- May 29 – Renauld I, French nobleman
- June 21 – Fulk III of Anjou, French nobleman (b. 970)
- August 14 – Duncan I, king of Scotland
- October 1 – Alan III, duke of Brittany (b. 997)
- Abu Hashim al-Hasan, Zaidi imam and ruler of Jemen
- Abu Nasr Mushkan, Persian statesman (or 1039)
- Ali Daya, Ghaznavid commander-in-chief, executed
- Begtoghdi, Ghaznavid commander-in-chief, executed
- Bertha of Milan, Lombard duchess (approximate date)
- Dietrich I, bishop of Meissen (approximate date)
- Gilbert, Count of Brionne, Norman nobleman (approximate date)
- Helias of Cologne, Irish abbot and musician
- Hugh, Italian nobleman (approximate date)
- Hugh I, count of Empúries and Peralada
- Ibn al-Haytham, Arab astronomer (approximate date)
- John V, duke of Gaeta (approximate date)
- Maria of Amalfi, Lombard duchess (approximate date)
- Nikephoros Dokeianos, Byzantine general
- Unsuri, Persian poet and writer (or 1039)
- Yeshe-Ö, Tibetan lama-king (approximate date)

1041

- February 4 – Fujiwara no Kintō, Japanese poet (b. 966)
- September – Budo, Hungarian courtier
- December 10 – Michael IV the Paphlagonian, Byzantine emperor (b. 1010)
- Adolf II of Lotharingia, German nobleman (b. 1002)
- Akazome Emon, Japanese waka poet (approximate date)
- Eadwulf IV of Bamburgh, Northumbrian ruler
- Edmund of Durham (or Eadmund), English bishop
- Gangeyadeva, Indian ruler of the Kalachuris of Tripuri
- Mac Beathaidh mac Ainmire, Irish poet and Chief Ollam
- Muhammad of Ghazni, sultan of the Ghaznavids (b. 998)
- Muhammad ibn Rustam Dushmanziyar, Buyid emir
- Peter Delyan, Bulgarian rebel leader and ruler (tsar)
- Sampiro, Spanish bishop, politician and intellectual
- Tancred of Hauteville, Norman nobleman (b. 980)
- Vikramabahu, Prince of Ruhuna (or Kassapa), ruler of Sri Lanka (b. 1017)

1042

- January 25 – Abbad I, founder of the Abbadid Dynasty (b. 984)
- June 8 – Harthacnut, king of Denmark and England
- August 24 – Michael V Kalaphates, Byzantine emperor
- Anushtakin al-Dizbari, Fatimid governor of Aleppo
- Pardos, Byzantine governor (catepan) of Italy

1043

- February 14 – Gisela of Swabia, Holy Roman Empress (b. 990)
- February 20 – Alexios Stoudites, patriarch of Constantinople
- June 26 – Gonzalo Sánchez, Spanish nobleman (b. 1020)
- July 26 – Moses the Hungarian, Kievan Russian monk
- Al-Muqtana Baha'uddin, Druze religious leader (b. 979)
- Cathal mac Ruaidhri, king of Maigh Seóla (Ireland)
- George Maniakes, Byzantine general and governor
- Hallvard Vebjørnsson, Norwegian patron saint
- Hywel ab Owain, king of Glywysing (Wales)

1044

- January 14 – Adelaide I, abbess of Quedlinburg
- February 13 – Zhao Yuanyan, Chinese prince of the Song dynasty (b. 985)
- April 19 – Gothelo I (or Gozelo), duke of Lorraine
- July 6 – Samuel Aba, palatine and king of Hungary
- August 11 – Sokkate, last king of the Pagan Kingdom, killed in combat (b. 1001)
- November 14 – Thietmar of Hildesheim, German bishop
- Abu'l-Husayn al-Basri, Mu'tazilite faqih and theologian
- Rajendra Chola I, emperor of the Chola dynasty
- Sharif al-Murtaza, Buyid Shia scholar (b. 965)

1045

- February 7 – Emperor Go-Suzaku of Japan (b. 1009)
- May 27 – Bruno of Würzburg, imperial chancellor of Italy (b. c. 1005)
- June 27 – Hemma of Gurk, Austrian religious founder and countess (b. 980)
- Radbot, Count of Habsburg (b. 985)
- Approximate date – Maria Skleraina, Byzantine Imperial political adviser

1046

- January 24 – Eckard II, Margrave of Meissen (or Ekkehard), German nobleman (b. 985)
- February 26 – Fujiwara no Sanesuke, Japanese nobleman (b. 957)
- March – Lyfing of Winchester, English abbot and bishop
- June 24 – Jeongjong II, king of Goryeo (b. 1018)
- July 18 – Elijah, bishop of Beth Nuhadra (b. 975)
- September 24 – Gerard of Csanád, Hungarian missionary bishop, killed
- September 27 – Bystrík (or Bestricus), Hungarian bishop, killed
- Art Uallach Ua Ruairc, Irish king of Connacht
- Eido II (or Egidius), bishop of Meissen (or 1045)
- Geoffrey II, count of Gâtinais (approximate date)
- Gothelo II, duke of Lower Lorraine (b. 1008)
- Oliba, Spanish count, abbot and bishop
- Richard of Verdun, French abbot (b. 970)
- William Iron Arm, Norman nobleman

1047

- March 29 (or 1048) – Æthelstan of Abingdon, English abbot (or 1048)
- June 16 – Poppo, archbishop of Trier
- August 29 – Ælfwine, bishop of Winchester
- September 7 – Otto II, duke of Swabia
- October 9 – Clement II, pope of the Catholic Church
- October 16 – Henry VII, German nobleman
- October 25 – Magnus the Good, king of Norway
- Eustace I, count of Boulogne (House of Flanders)
- Grimketel, English clergyman and bishop
- Humbert I, founder of the House of Savoy (or 1048)
- Levente, Hungarian nobleman (House of Árpád)
- Miecław (or Miesław), Polish nobleman
- Nripa Kama II, Indian king (Hoysala Empire)
- Raymond III, count of Pallars Jussà
- Rodulfus Glaber, French Benedictine chronicler (b. 985)
- Stephen II, count of Troyes and Meaux
- Approximate date
  - Gerard Flaitel, Norman nobleman and knight
  - Godgifu, English princess

1048

- January 19 – Jingzong, Chinese founding emperor of Western Xia (b. 1003)
- January 25 – Poppo, abbot of Stavelot-Malmedy (b. 977)
- March 29 (or 1047) – Æthelstan of Abingdon, English abbot (or 1047)
- June 1 – Minamoto no Yorinobu, Japanese samurai (b. 968)
- June 7 – Berno of Reichenau, German abbot
- August 9 – Damasus II, pope of the Catholic Church
- November 11 – Adalbert, duke of Upper Lorraine (b. 1000)
- December 9 – Al-Biruni, Persian scholar and polymath (b. 973)
- Cenn Fáelad Ua Cúill, Irish poet and Chief Ollam
- Humbert I, founder of the House of Savoy (or 1047)
- Mael Fabhaill Ua hEidhin, Irish king of Uí Fiachrach Aidhne
- Rainulf Trincanocte, Italo-Norman nobleman

1049

- January 1 – Odilo of Cluny, French Benedictine abbot
- January 12 – Abū-Sa'īd Abul-Khayr, Persian Sufi poet (b. 967)
- January 13 – Dirk IV, count of Friesland west of the Vlie
- December 1 – Ermesinda of Bigorre, queen of Aragon (b. 1015)
- Airlangga, Indonesian ruler (raja) of Kahuripan
