= 1048 =

1048 in various calendars
- Gregorian calendar: 1048; MXLVIII
- Ab urbe condita: 1801
- Armenian calendar: 497; ԹՎ ՆՂԷ
- Assyrian calendar: 5798
- Balinese saka calendar: 969–970
- Bengali calendar: 454–455
- Berber calendar: 1998
- English Regnal year: N/A
- Buddhist calendar: 1592
- Burmese calendar: 410
- Byzantine calendar: 6556–6557
- Chinese calendar: 丁亥年 (Fire Pig); 3745 or 3538 — to — 戊子年 (Earth Rat); 3746 or 3539
- Coptic calendar: 764–765
- Discordian calendar: 2214
- Ethiopian calendar: 1040–1041
- Hebrew calendar: 4808–4809
- Hindu calendars
- Vikram Samvat: 1104–1105
- Shaka Samvat: 969–970
- Kali Yuga: 4148–4149
- Holocene calendar: 11048
- Igbo calendar: 48–49
- Iranian calendar: 426–427
- Islamic calendar: 439–440
- Japanese calendar: Eishō 3 (永承３年)
- Javanese calendar: 951–952
- Julian calendar: 1048; MXLVIII
- Korean calendar: 3381
- Minguo calendar: 864 before ROC 民前864年
- Nanakshahi calendar: −420
- Seleucid era: 1359/1360 AG
- Thai solar calendar: 1590–1591
- Tibetan calendar: མེ་མོ་ཕག་ལོ་ (female Fire-Boar); 1174 or 793 or 21 — to — ས་ཕོ་བྱི་བ་ལོ་ (male Earth-Rat); 1175 or 794 or 22

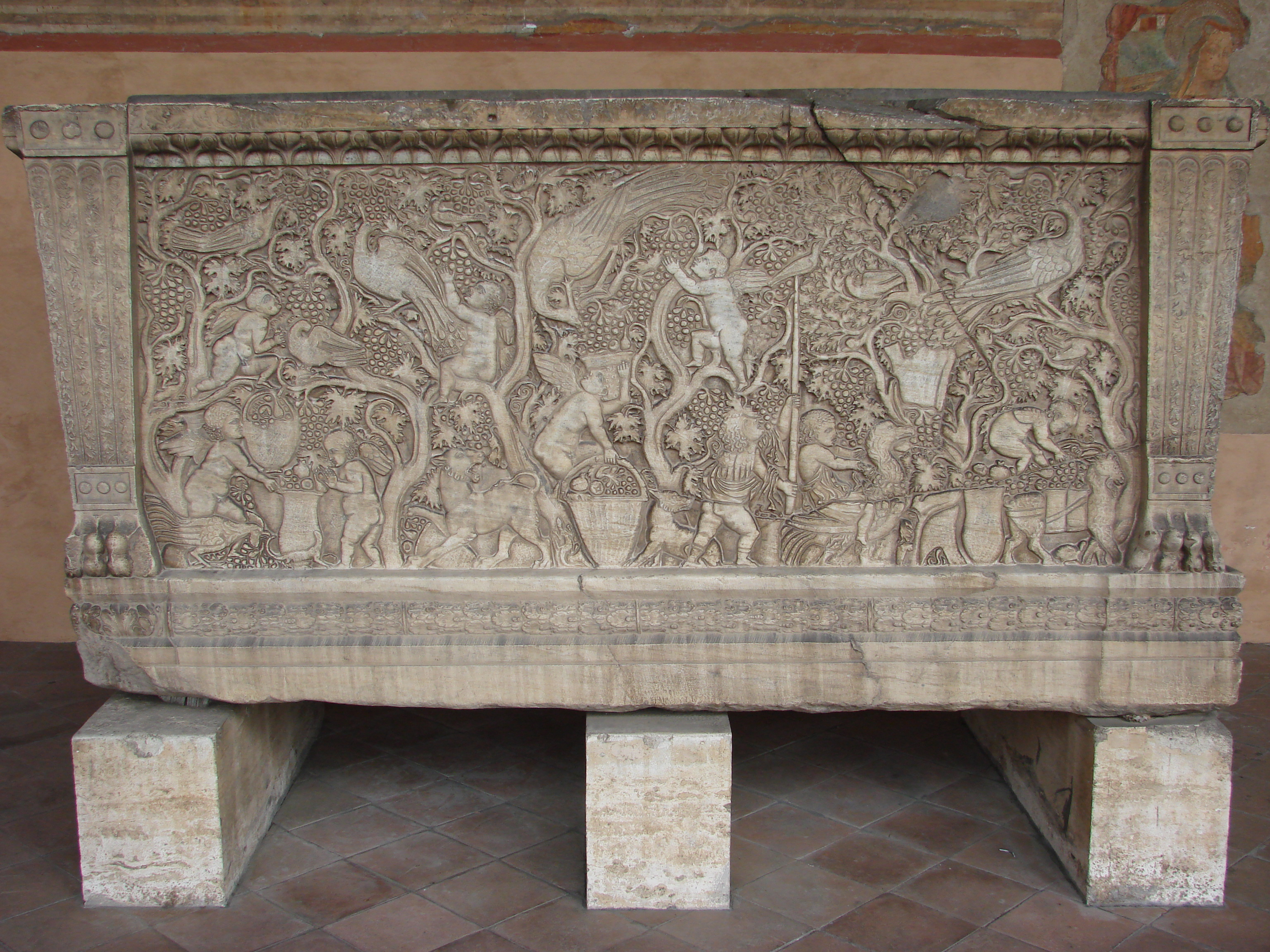
Tomb of Pope Damasus II (r. 1048)

1048 (MXLVIII) was a leap year starting on Friday of the Julian calendar, the 1048th year of the Common Era (CE) and Anno Domini (AD) designations, the 48th year of the 2nd millennium and the 11th century, and the 9th year of the 1040s decade. As of the start of 1048, the Gregorian calendar was 6 days ahead of the Julian calendar, which was the dominant calendar of the time.

== Events ==
=== By place ===
==== Byzantine Empire ====
- September 18 – Battle of Kapetron: A combined Byzantine-Georgian army, under Byzantine generals Aaronios and Katakalon Kekaumenos (supported by the Georgian duke Liparit IV), confronts the invading Seljuk Turks, led by Ibrahim Inal (a half-brother of Sultan Tughril), at Kapetron (near modern-day Pasinler). The Byzantines defeat their opposing Turkish forces in the flanks, but in the centre Ibrahim Inal captures Liparit, and can safely withdraw from Byzantine territory, laden with spoils and captives, including Liparit.
- Winter – Emperor Constantine IX sends an embassy with gifts and a ransom, to release Liparit IV to Tughril. However, the sultan sets Liparit free, on the condition that he will never again fight the Seljuks.

==== Europe ====
- Winter – Henry III, Holy Roman Emperor appoints his cousin, Bishop Bruno of Toul (related to the counts of Egisheim-Dagsburg in Upper Alsace) as successor of Damasus II at an assembly at Worms.
- The city of Oslo is founded by King Harald Hardrada of Norway (approximate date).

==== England ====
- 1048 or 1066 – End of the Viking Age: Vikings make an unsuccessful raid on the Kingdom of England; The raiders flee to Flanders (modern Belgium).
- King Edward the Confessor goes to war against Flanders, blockading the English Channel with a fleet based at Sandwich, Kent.

==== China ====
- Catastrophic Yellow River flood in Northern Song China; the river changes its course until 1194.

=== By topic ===
==== Religion ====
- July 16 – At orders of Henry III, German troops under Boniface III, Margrave of Tuscany ("of Canossa"), enter Rome and expel Pope Benedict IX.
- July 17 – Pope Damasus II succeeds Benedict IX as the 151st pope of the Catholic Church, but dies after 23 days.
- December – Bruno von Egisheim-Dagsburg, bishop of Toul, is selected as the new pope by an assembly at Worms - after canonical election in Rome next February, he assumes the name Pope Leo IX.

== Births ==
- May 18 – Omar Khayyam, Persian mathematician and poet (d. 1131)
- May 25 – Shenzong, emperor of the Song dynasty (d. 1085)
- October – Matilda of Germany, duchess of Swabia (d. 1060)
- Arwa al-Sulayhi, queen and co-ruler of Yemen (d. 1138)
- Domnall Ua Lochlainn, High King of Ireland (d. 1121)
- Harding of Bristol, English sheriff reeve (approximate date)
- Magnus II (Haraldsson), king of Norway (approximate date)
- Peter I, Italian nobleman (House of Savoy) (d. 1078) (approximate date)
- Sheikh Ahmad-e Jami, Persian Sufi writer and poet (d. 1141)
- Turgot of Durham, Scottish bishop (approximate date)

== Deaths ==
- January 19 – Jingzong, Chinese founding emperor of Western Xia (b. 1003)
- January 25 – Poppo, abbot of Stavelot-Malmedy (b. 977)
- March 29 (or 1047) – Æthelstan of Abingdon, English abbot (or 1047)
- June 1 – Minamoto no Yorinobu, Japanese samurai (b. 968)
- June 7 – Berno of Reichenau, German abbot
- August 9 – Damasus II, pope of the Catholic Church
- November 11 – Adalbert, duke of Upper Lorraine (b. 1000)
- December 9 – Al-Biruni, Persian scholar and polymath (b. 973)
- Cenn Fáelad Ua Cúill, Irish poet and Chief Ollam
- Humbert I, founder of the House of Savoy (or 1047)
- Mael Fabhaill Ua hEidhin, Irish king of Uí Fiachrach Aidhne
- Rainulf Trincanocte, Italo-Norman nobleman
