= Budo =

Budo or buddo may refer to:

- Budō, a Japanese term describing Japanese martial arts
- Budo (courtier), 11th-century Hungarian royal advisor
- Buddo hill, a hill in central Uganda cultural and academic significance
  - Kings College Budo, a mixed boarding high school located on Budo Hill
- Budo (G.I. Joe), a fictional character in the G.I. Joe universe
- Budo (musician), an American hip hop producer and multi-instrumentalist
- "Budo", a jazz composition on the Miles Davis Nonet compilation Birth of the Cool
