= Sebes (margrave) =

Hungarian nobleman, 11th century

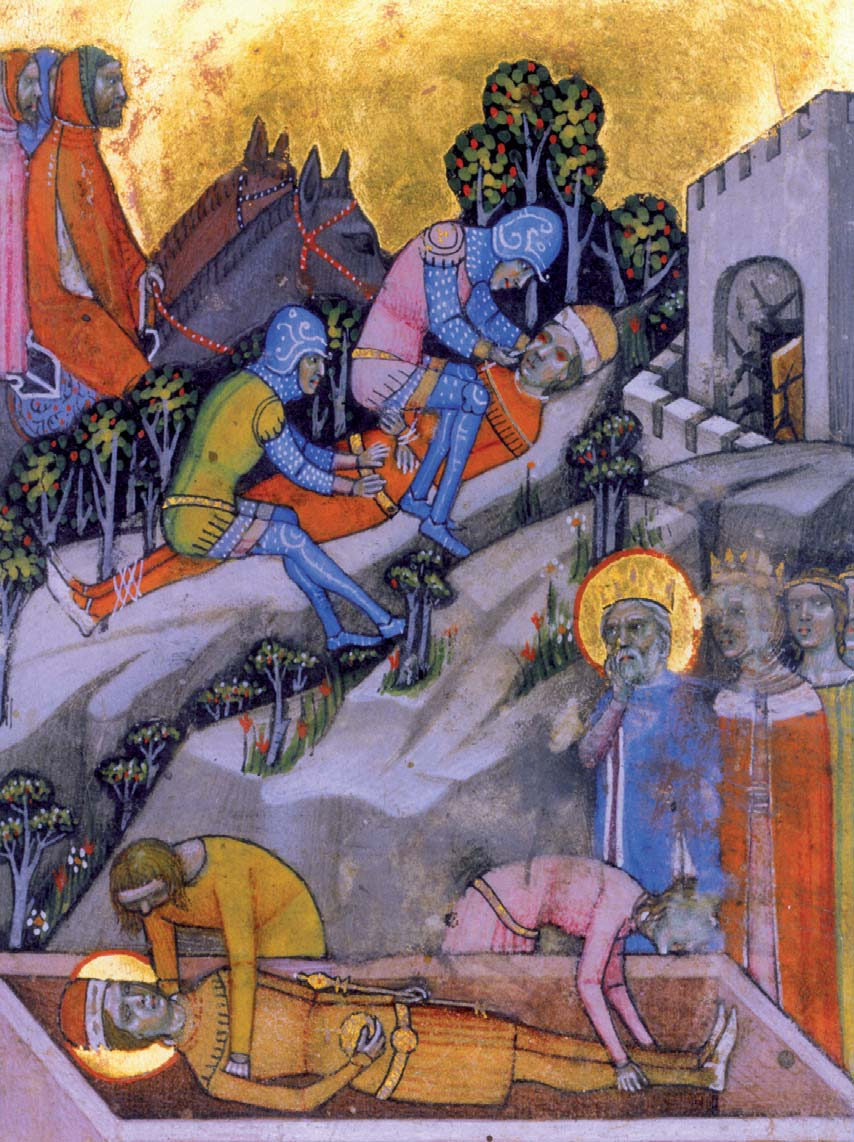
- Sebes blinds Vazul (centre), as depicted in the Illuminated Chronicle
- Born: 10th century
- Died: 1039 or September 1041
- Father: Budo

Sebes or Sebus (German: Schebis; died 1039 or September 1041) was a Hungarian nobleman in the first half of the 11th century. The Illuminated Chronicle narrates that he blinded and mutilated Vazul, a claimant to the Hungarian throne.

== Family ==
His father was Budo, an influential advisor of kings Stephen I then Peter Orseolo. Based on the names of his father and grandfather (Egiruth), the family was of German descent. However, based on Sebes' name of Hungarian origin, the kinship successfully integrated into the Hungarian nobility by the first decades of the 11th century. According to the Annales Altahenses and the Illuminated Chronicle, Sebes had two brothers who were significantly younger than him.

== Career ==
Meanwhile his [Stephen's] bodily strength began to fail, and feeling himself overcome with a great lassitude he sent in haste a messenger, namely Buda, the son of Egiruth, charging him that Vazul, the son of his uncle, should be taken from the prison of Nitra where the king had shut him up that he might amend his youthful wantonness and folly, and should be brought to him in order that before his death he might appoint him king. Hearing this, Queen Gisela contrived a plan with Buda, who was an evil man, and in the greatest haste she sent a messenger, whose name was Sebus, son of that same Buda, to the prison in which Vazul was held. Arriving there before the messenger of the king, Sebus put out Vazul's eyes and filled the cavities of his ears with lead, and fled to Bohemia.

— Illuminated Chronicle

When Emeric, the heir and only son of King Stephen I died in a hunting accident in September 1031, uncertainty arose regarding the succession to the throne. Stephen's cousin, Vazul – who had the strongest claim to succeed him – was suspected of an inclination towards paganism. According to the Annales Altahenses, the monarch disregarded his cousin's claim and nominated his nephew, the Venetian Peter Orseolo, as his heir. To ensure this, Vazul, who, according to Stephen's legenda minor, attempted an assassination attempt against the king, was captured and blinded, and his three sons, Levente, Andrew and Béla, were expelled from Hungary. The succession dispute, the alleged assassination attempt and ultimately Vazul's blinding as a series of events occurred sometime between 1032 and 1037. The Hungarian chronicle text, including the Illuminated Chronicle, written under kings descending from Vazul's line, narrates a contrasting report on the events. Accordingly, Stephen initially was planning to nominate Vazul as his heir, but Vazul's enemies, including the queen, Gisela hatched a plot to hinder the king's plans. When Stephen I sent his envoy Budo to hurry up and release Vazul, who was being held prisoner in the Nyitra Castle, Budo, instead, informed Gisela about the king's plan. Thereafter, they sent Budo's son, Sebes, ahead to Nyitra, where he blinded and mutilated Vazul, then fled to Bohemia before the king's delegation led by Budo arrived.

The text of the Hungarian chronicle is burdened with later additions and modifications, which aimed to nullify Stephen's responsibility in blinding Vazul and choosing Peter. While the Annales Altahenses preserved a close-to-realistic course of events, the redaction of the chronicle text blamed Queen Gisela and the "evil advisor" Budo. In this context, Sebes carried out the blinding of Vazul on the orders of the elderly monarch. Péter Váczy argued that, based on Sebes' title of marchio, Sebes functioned as ispán of Nyitra County and its royal stronghold, and in this capacity he fulfilled the order.

After Peter ascended the Hungarian throne in 1038, Sebes was styled as marchio or margrave. It is plausible that he, as a skilled military leader, administered the borderland between the rivers Leitha and Fischa, which Hungary acquired in the war of 1030 against the Holy Roman Empire. According to the Annales Altahenses, margrave Sebes died in 1039 ("Schebis marchio Ungarie eodem anno est defunctus"). The Illuminated Chronicle claims, however, that Sebes was assassinated along with his father and brothers, when Peter was deposed by a conspiracy of magnates in September 1041. Accordingly, "they [the rebels] also killed Sebus, who had put out the eyes of Vazul, by breaking his hands and feet. Some they stoned and others they beat to death with iron rods". The Hungarian historiography prefers to accept the former information. The later chronicler, who already declared Vazul's blinding a crime, probably deliberately invented a violent death for Sebes, thereby illustrating that the Hungarian nobility (or divine providence) inflicted exemplary punishment on all those responsible for Vazul's death. It is likely that Sebes died peacefully in 1039, during the reign of Peter. The author of the annals considered it worth recording his death because, as a margrave, Sebes was already an important figure in border relations and conflicts.

== Sources ==
=== Primary sources ===
- Bak, János M.; Veszprémy, László; Kersken, Norbert (2018). Chronica de gestis Hungarorum e codice picto saec. XIV [The Illuminated Chronicle: Chronicle of the deeds of the Hungarians from the fourteenth-century illuminated codex]. Budapest: Central European University Press. ISBN 978-9-6338-6264-3.

=== Secondary sources ===
- Györffy, György (2013). István király és műve [King Stephen and his work] (in Hungarian). Balassi Kiadó. ISBN 978-963-506-896-8.
- Kristó, Gyula (1999). Az államalapítás korának írott forrásai [Written Sources of the Ages of the Foundation of the State] (in Hungarian). Szegedi Középkorász Műhely. ISBN 963-482-393-9.
- Pauler, Gyula (1899). A magyar nemzet története az Árpád-házi királyok alatt, I. [The History of the Hungarian Nation during the Árpádian Kings, Vol. 1.] (in Hungarian). Athenaeum.
- Uhrman, Iván (2010). "Az utolsó törzsfő vagy az első parasztvezér? Az úgynevezett Vata-felkelés [The Last Chieftain or the First Peasant Leader? The so-called Vata Uprising]". Hadtörténelmi Közlemények (in Hungarian). 123 (1–2). Hadtörténeti Intézet és Múzeum: 44–112. ISSN 0017-6540.
