= Empress Xuanyi =

Empress Xuanyi may refer to:

- Empress Fu the Elder (931–956), wife of Guo Rong (a.k.a. Chai Rong, Emperor Shizong of Later Zhou)
- Xiao Guanyin (1040–1075), wife of Emperor Daozong of Liao
