= 1047 =

1047 in various calendars
- Gregorian calendar: 1047; MXLVII
- Ab urbe condita: 1800
- Armenian calendar: 496; ԹՎ ՆՂԶ
- Assyrian calendar: 5797
- Balinese saka calendar: 968–969
- Bengali calendar: 453–454
- Berber calendar: 1997
- English Regnal year: N/A
- Buddhist calendar: 1591
- Burmese calendar: 409
- Byzantine calendar: 6555–6556
- Chinese calendar: 丙戌年 (Fire Dog); 3744 or 3537 — to — 丁亥年 (Fire Pig); 3745 or 3538
- Coptic calendar: 763–764
- Discordian calendar: 2213
- Ethiopian calendar: 1039–1040
- Hebrew calendar: 4807–4808
- Hindu calendars
- Vikram Samvat: 1103–1104
- Shaka Samvat: 968–969
- Kali Yuga: 4147–4148
- Holocene calendar: 11047
- Igbo calendar: 47–48
- Iranian calendar: 425–426
- Islamic calendar: 438–439
- Japanese calendar: Eishō 2 (永承２年)
- Javanese calendar: 950–951
- Julian calendar: 1047; MXLVII
- Korean calendar: 3380
- Minguo calendar: 865 before ROC 民前865年
- Nanakshahi calendar: −421
- Seleucid era: 1358/1359 AG
- Thai solar calendar: 1589–1590
- Tibetan calendar: མེ་ཕོ་ཁྱི་ལོ་ (male Fire-Dog); 1173 or 792 or 20 — to — མེ་མོ་ཕག་ལོ་ (female Fire-Boar); 1174 or 793 or 21

Map of the Battle of Val-ès-Dunes (1047)

Year 1047 (MXLVII) was a common year starting on Thursday of the Julian calendar.

== Events ==
=== By place ===
==== Byzantine Empire ====
- September 25–28 – Rebel general Leo Tornikios (a nephew of Emperor Constantine IX) proclaims himself emperor at Adrianople, and besieges Constantinople. Byzantine troops personally led by Constantine repel him, and re-occupy the walls. Tornikios is forced to withdraw, while his followers start to abandon him. Finally, he is captured at a church in Boulgarophygon (modern Turkey), and is publicly blinded.
- Winter – Constantine IX allows the Pecheneg tribes to cross the Danube and settle permanently in Byzantine territory. He buys their alliance with presents, using them to attack his enemies (Bulgars and Magyars) in the rear, and so to prevent any southward advance of the Kievan Rus'.

==== Europe ====
- Spring – Henry III, Holy Roman Emperor ("the Black") travels to southern Italy, and deprives Guaimar IV of his title Duke of Apulia and Calabria. He receives homage from Drogo of Hauteville, who becomes "Duke and Master of all Italy".
- August 10 – Battle of Val-ès-Dunes: Norman duke William I secures control over Normandy with assistance from King Henry I of France by defeating rebel Norman barons at Caen. Later in October, William promulgates the "Truce of God" throughout his duchy.
- October 25 – Harald Hardrada becomes sole king of Norway on the death of his nephew and co-regent Magnus I ("the Good"). The crown of Denmark passes to Sweyn II.

=== By topic ===
==== Religion ====
- October 9 – Pope Clement II dies suddenly after a 9-month pontificate. Benedict IX usurps the papal throne as the 150th pope of the Catholic Church (his third time in the office).
- November – Benedict IX, with support of Boniface III, Margrave of Tuscany, seizes the Lateran Palace in Rome.

== Births ==
- December 28 – Sunjong, ruler of Goryeo (d. 1083)
- Cai Jing, Chinese official and calligrapher (d. 1126)
- Qingshui, Chinese Chan Buddhist monk (d. 1101)
- Xiang, Chinese empress regent of the Song dynasty (d. 1102)
- Yizong, Chinese emperor of Western Xia (d. 1068)
- Approximate date
  - Hugh d'Avranches, Norman nobleman (d. 1101)
  - Simon de Crépy, French nobleman
  - Wyszesława of Kiev, duchess of Poland

== Deaths ==
- March 29 (or 1048) – Æthelstan of Abingdon, English abbot (or 1048)
- June 16 – Poppo, archbishop of Trier
- August 29 – Ælfwine, bishop of Winchester
- September 7 – Otto II, duke of Swabia
- October 9 – Clement II, pope of the Catholic Church
- October 16 – Henry VII, German nobleman
- October 25 – Magnus the Good, king of Norway
- Eustace I, count of Boulogne (House of Flanders)
- Grimketel, English clergyman and bishop
- Humbert I, founder of the House of Savoy (or 1048)
- Levente, Hungarian nobleman (House of Árpád)
- Miecław (or Miesław), Polish nobleman
- Nripa Kama II, Indian king (Hoysala Empire)
- Raymond III, count of Pallars Jussà
- Rodulfus Glaber, French Benedictine chronicler (b. 985)
- Stephen II, count of Troyes and Meaux
- Approximate date
  - Gerard Flaitel, Norman nobleman and knight
  - Godgifu, English princess
