= Flaithem Mac Mael Gaimrid =

Irish poet

Flaithem Mac Mael Gaimrid, Irish poet, died 1058.

Flaithem Mac Mael Gaimrid was Chief Ollam of Ireland. The Annals of Inisfallen give his obit as follows- "AI1058.8 Flaithem son of Mael Gaimrid, chief poet of Ireland, rested in Christ in Ard Ferta Brénainn."

Preceded by Ceaunfaeladh ua Cuill	Chief Ollam of Ireland; 1048–1058	Succeeded by Cellach húa Rúanada
