= Battle of Kapetron =

Battle of the Byzantine–Seljuq wars, 1048

- Part of the Byzantine–Seljuq wars and Georgian–Seljuk wars
Date	18 September 1048
Location	Plain of Kapetron (modern Hasankale/Pasinler, Turkey) 39°58′47″N 41°40′32″E
Result	Inconclusive

Belligerents
Byzantine Empire; Duchy of Kldekari	Seljuk Empire

Commanders and leaders
Aaron; Katakalon Kekaumenos; Liparit IV of Kldekari (POW)	Ibrahim Inal; Aspan Salarios; Chorosantes †
- Location within Turkey

The Battle of Kapetron or Kapetrou was fought between a Byzantine-Georgian army and the Seljuq Turks at the plain of Kapetron (modern Hasankale/Pasinler in northeastern Turkey) in 1048. The event was the culmination of a major raid led by the Seljuq prince Ibrahim Inal into Byzantine-ruled Armenia. A combination of factors meant that the regular Byzantine forces were at a considerable numerical disadvantage against the Turks: the local thematic armies had been disbanded, while many of the professional troops had been diverted to the Balkans to face the revolt of Leo Tornikios. As a result, the Byzantine commanders, Aaron and Katakalon Kekaumenos, disagreed on how best to confront the invasion. Kekaumenos favoured an immediate and pre-emptive strike, while Aaron favoured a more cautious strategy until the arrival of reinforcements. Emperor Constantine IX chose the latter option and ordered his forces to adopt a passive stance, while requesting aid from the ruler of Georgian Duchy of Kldekari, Liparit IV. This allowed the Turks to ravage at will, notably leading to the sack and destruction of the great commercial centre of Artze.

After the Georgians arrived, the combined Byzantine–Georgian force gave battle at Kapetron (modern Hasankale). In a fierce nocturnal battle, the Christian allies managed to repel the Turks, and Aaron and Kekaumenos, in command of the two flanks, pursued the Turks until the next morning. In the centre, however, Inal managed to capture Liparit, a fact of which the two Byzantine commanders were not informed until after they had given thanks to God for their victory. Inal was able to return unmolested to the Seljuq capital at Rayy, carrying enormous plunder. The two sides exchanged embassies, leading to the release of Liparit and the start of diplomatic relations between the Byzantine and Seljuq courts. Emperor Constantine IX took steps to strengthen his eastern frontier, but due to infighting the Turkish invasions did not recommence until 1054. The Turks experienced increasing success, aided by the renewed diversion of Byzantine troops to the Balkans to fight the Pechenegs, disputes between the various ethnic groups of the eastern Byzantine provinces, and the decline of the Byzantine army.

== Background ==
After the conquest of territories in present-day Iran by the Seljuq Empire, a large number of Oghuz Turks arrived on the Byzantine borderlands of Armenia in the late 1040s. Eager for plunder and distinction in the path of jihad, they began raiding the Byzantine provinces in Armenia. At the same time, the eastern defences of the Byzantine Empire had been weakened by Emperor Constantine IX Monomachos (r. 1042–1055), who allowed the thematic troops (provincial levies) of Iberia and Mesopotamia to relinquish their military obligations in favour of tax payments.

The Seljuq expansion westward was a confused affair, as it was accompanied by a mass migration of Turkish tribes. These tribes were only nominally subjects of the Seljuq rulers, and their relations were dominated by a complex dynamic: while the Seljuqs aimed at establishing a state with an orderly administration, the tribes were more interested in plunder and new pasture lands, and launched raids independently of the Seljuq court. The latter tolerated this phenomenon, as it helped to defuse tensions in the Seljuq heartlands.

A first large-scale raid against the eastern Byzantine province of Vaspurakan may have been undertaken around 1045 by Qutalmish, a cousin of the Seljuq ruler Tughril Beg. Qutalmish defeated and captured the local Byzantine commander, Stephen Leichoudes. Another large-scale invasion, under Tughril's nephew, Hasan the Deaf, was launched soon after from Tabriz into Georgia. Returning via Vaspurakan, Hasan's army was ambushed and destroyed east of Lake Van by the local Byzantine commanders, the katepano of Vaspurakan, Aaron, and the katepano of Ani and Iberia, Katakalon Kekaumenos. This first raid is variously dated either to 1045/46 or 1048.

An even larger invasion followed, under Ibrahim Inal, the half-brother of Tughril Beg. The Byzantine sources regard this as a retaliation for Hasan's defeat, but as Anthony Kaldellis points out, there were other factors at play as well: Ibn al-Athir reports that Ibrahim had at this time received a large number of recent Oghuz arrivals from Transoxiana, and that, unable to provide for them, sent them to raid the Byzantine provinces of Armenia, promising that he would soon follow with his own troops.

The events of this campaign are well attested through the histories of the Armenian historians Aristakes Lastivertsi and Matthew of Edessa, and the Byzantine official John Skylitzes. Ibrahim's invasion is usually dated by modern sources to 1048 although some date it to 1049. (Note: Skylitzes places the battle on Saturday, 18 September in the "second year of the indiction", which is 1048, and Ibn al-Athir in AH 440, which began in June 1048. However, 18 September in 1048 was a Sunday, and both Skylitzes and Matthew of Edessa report that the battle took place on a Saturday. As a result, the 19th-century German historian August Friedrich Gfrörer, followed by other scholars since, proposed shifting the date to 18 September 1049, although this is not generally accepted. According to the German historian Wolfgang Felix, the "most convincing solution" for this discrepancy was proposed by the French scholar Paul Orgels in 1938, in which the battle began on Saturday evening (17 September 1048) and was carried on until the next morning. Vladimir Minorsky also argues for dating the battle 1048, in the context of Byzantine operations against the Shaddadids after the battle, which he demonstrates, from a number of other references and associations of events, to have taken place before 1049.)

== Seljuq invasion and Byzantine reaction ==
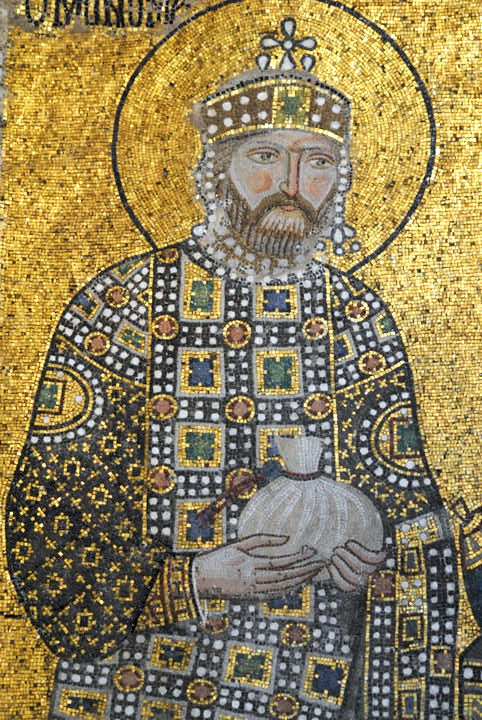
Emperor Constantine IX, mosaic from the Hagia Sophia

Skylitzes reports, with obvious exaggeration, that the invaders numbered 100,000 men, or five times as many as Hasan's force. He also adds the detail that alongside the Turks, the Seljuq army also counted many "Dilimnites" (Daylamites) and "Kabeiroi" (probably Khurasani Iranians). Indeed, Skylitzes mentions that Ibrahim had two lieutenants, one "Chorosantes" (possibly a corruption of Khurasani), who likely commanded the Khurasani contingent, and "Aspan Salarios", clearly a hellenisation of the Persian military rank ispahsalar.

Like the previous raid, the Seljuq force most likely set out from Tabriz and, following the course of the Araxes River, entered Vasurakan. Ibn al-Athir reports that raiding detachments reached as far as Trebizond in Chaldia and the Akampsis river in the north, and the districts of Taron and Chorzianene in the south, but this probably refers to the Oghuz raiders Ibrahim had sent out, rather than the main part of his army. Ibrahim's main army raided the district of Basean, and the area between Theodosiopolis, Artze, and the district of Mananalis.

On the Byzantine side, Skylitzes records a difference of opinion as to how to counter the Seljuq invasion: Kekaumenos—who was probably one of the historian's main sources and is generally lionised by Skylitzes—reportedly argued that they should confront them as soon as possible, while they were still weary from their march and the Byzantines were in high spirits after their recent victory. Aaron, on the other hand, argued in favour of a defensive strategy against such a large army, recommending withdrawing behind their fortifications and conserving their forces until Emperor Constantine IX sent clear instructions.

It is clear that the Byzantines were considerably outnumbered, likely as an effect not only of the reduction of the eastern provincial troops under Constantine IX, but also due to the diversion of much of the tagmatic troops (standing, professional forces) to deal with a revolt of the western armies under Leo Tornikios in 1047. As a result, Aaron's view prevailed; messages were sent to Constantinople to inform the Emperor, and in the meantime the Byzantine troops made camp on the plain of Outrou in Basean, while the civilian population was ordered to find refuge in the local fortresses. Indeed, Emperor Constantine IX quickly sent orders that they should avoid action until the arrival of reinforcements, namely the Georgians of Liparit IV, Duke of Kldekari, (Note: Liparit was the most powerful Georgian noble, ruling a large portion of the Georgian kingdom under the nominal suzerainty of King Bagrat IV. A Byzantine ally, he had been given the title of magistros, and perhaps of kouropalates as well.) to whom the Emperor wrote requesting his aid.

=== Sack of Artze ===
The Byzantine army's inactivity had tragic consequences, as the Seljuqs were able to move about freely, and attack the fortress of Artze, a wealthy market town which attracted merchants from Syria and Armenia. The inhabitants resisted successfully for a while, as the Seljuqs could not overcome the barricades they had hastily erected; but Kekaumenos' urgings to go to the town's aid were rebuffed, according to Skylitzes, by his fellow generals on account of the Emperor's order. Finally, the Seljuqs dropped flammable material and torches into the town, so that the defenders, caught between a raging fire and the Turkish archers, broke and fled. The town was captured and plundered, and its inhabitants massacred; Skylitzes writes that "around 150,000 souls reportedly perished" by sword or by fire, although this number is considered exaggerated by modern scholars.

== Battle ==
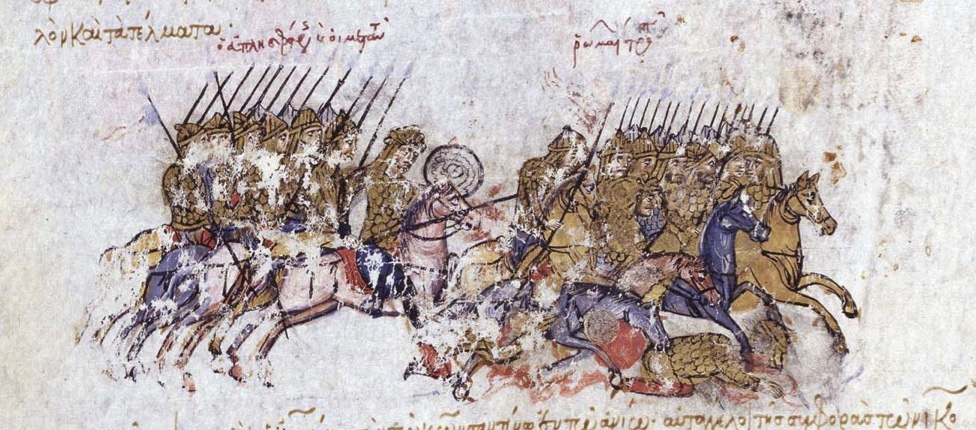
Battle between Byzantines and Muslims in Armenia in the mid-11th century, miniature from the Madrid Skylitzes manuscript

Once Liparit IV arrived with his army, the combined Byzantine–Georgian army moved from Ourtrou to the plain before the fortress of Kapetron (modern Hasankale). Ibn al-Athir claims that the Byzantine–Georgian troops numbered 50,000 men, while Aristakes Lastivertsi raises the number to 60,000. Just as with the Turkish army, both figures are considered clearly exaggerated by modern historians. (Note: Matthew of Edessa and the 13th-century historian Sempad the Constable report that the Armenian nobleman Grigor Magistros also took part in the battle as a Byzantine commander, but this is not supported by other sources.)

Again, according to Skylitzes, Kekaumenos' advice to attack the isolated Turkish detachments as they arrived was not heeded, because it was a Saturday (18 September) and Liparit considered it an unlucky day and refused to fight. This gave time for the Turks to bring up their entire army and form battle lines, before advancing on the Byzantine–Georgian army, which now was forced "to prepare to give battle, willy-nilly". Kekaumenos commanded the right wing, faced on the Turkish side by Ibrahim himself. Liparit held the centre, faced by Aspan Salarios, while the Byzantine left was commanded by Aaron, who was faced by Chorosantes.

The battle began late in the evening, and lasted through the night. Aaron and Kekaumenos, in command of their respective flanks, each defeated the Turks and pursued them "till cock's crow", killing the Turkish commander Chorosantes in the process. In the centre, however, Ibrahim managed to capture Liparit, who was thrown off his horse when it was wounded. This was not known to the two Byzantine commanders, who thought the Georgian prince was pursuing the enemy as they were; they were not informed of the true events until after they had stopped their pursuit to give thanks to God for their victory. Matthew of Edessa, whose narrative is heavily anti-Byzantine, claims that Liparit was betrayed by the Byzantine commanders, while Aristakes claims that the rivalry between the Byzantine commanders led Aaron to abandon his position mid-battle, leading to Liparit's capture. Skylitzes' account, however, being far more detailed, is considered more reliable by modern scholars.

While Ibrahim managed to escape with his men and captives to the fortress of Kastrokome (Okomi), some 40 km east of Theodosiopolis, the Byzantine commanders held a council of war and decided to divide their forces and return to their respective bases: Aaron with his men returned to Vaspurakan, and Kekaumenos with his forces to Ani.

The overall result of the battle was thus mixed: while the Byzantines prevailed against their Turkish counterparts, the capture of Liparit and the successful escape of Ibrahim led some of the medieval sources to consider it a Byzantine defeat.

== Aftermath ==
Political map of the Caucasus region c. 1060

According to Skylitzes, Ibrahim returned to Rayy in only five days, presenting himself before his brother. Ibn al-Athir reports—with obvious exaggeration for propaganda purposes—that Ibrahim brought back 100,000 captives and a vast booty, including large numbers of horses, flocks, and goods, as well as 8,000 coats of mail, loaded on the backs of ten thousand camels.

The devastation left behind by the Seljuq raid was so fearful that in 1051/52 the Byzantine magnate Eustathios Boilas described those lands as "foul and unmanageable... inhabited by snakes, scorpions, and wild beasts". The Muslim sources on the other hand, follow the conventions of jihad narratives in stressing the success of the campaign in reaching deep into Byzantine territory—allegedly only 15 days' march from Constantinople—and the amount of plunder and captives seized. These successes were widely publicized to serve political aims: taking up the mantle of jihad against the age-old enemy of Islam legitimized the upstart Seljuqs and bolstered their claims to be the pre-eminent power in the Muslim world, particularly in their chosen role as champions of Sunni orthodoxy against the Shi'a Fatimid Caliphate.

Emperor Constantine IX lamented Liparit's capture, and tried to secure his release, offering a rich ransom. The Seljuq ruler set Liparit free and gave him the ransom, after extracting a pledge from him not to fight against the Turks again. (Note: The sources provide slightly different, but not mutually exclusive, accounts on these events. Skylitzes reports that Constantine IX sent an embassy to Tughril Beg, headed by Aaron's secretary, George Drosos. Ibn al-Athir reports that the Emperor used the Marwanid emir of Diyar Bakr, Nasr al-Dawla, to mediate on his behalf, while Matthew of Edessa claims that Liparit was set free after he slew a black African champion in single combat, impressing Tughril with his valour. The Georgian Chronicles on the other hand suggest that Liparit's release was a calculated move to create dissension in Georgia, where after his capture the authority of King Bagrat IV had grown considerably. Indeed, after his release Liparit reclaimed his former authority against Bagrat.) Tughril—perhaps swayed by his brother's claims that the campaign had been an unalloyed success—also sent a sharif to Constantinople to demand tribute of Constantine IX, but the envoy was sent back empty-handed. Constantine IX did, however, agree to allow Tughril to sponsor the restoration of the mosque of the Byzantine capital, and to have the names of the Abbasid caliph al-Qa'im and of Tughril himself commemorated in the Friday prayer instead of the Fatimid caliph's.

Expecting an imminent resumption of Seljuq raids, the Emperor sent agents to fortify his eastern border, but Tughril was occupied for a time with the revolt of Ibrahim, instigated, according to Skylitzes, by the Seljuq ruler's jealousy of the achievements of his brother. This is likely also the moment (Note: Some authors have suggested a later date, c. 1050 (A.F. Gfrörer and M.H. Yinanç) or even c. 1055/56 (E. Honigmann)) when the Byzantines launched an offensive, under the rhaiktor Nikephoros, against their old adversary, Abu'l-Aswar Shavur ibn Fadl, the Shaddadid emir of Dvin.

Nevertheless, the Byzantine defences in the east were weakened again as troops were transferred to the Balkans to face the invasions of the Pechenegs, which began at that time. The Seljuq raids recommenced on a large scale in 1054, with Tughril himself leading them: the cities of Paipert and Perkri were sacked, and Manzikert was besieged. The Turkish incursions continued, with increasing success, as the native Byzantine troops were run down by neglect from the central government, increasingly replaced by unreliable mercenaries, and misguided policies exacerbated the rivalries and disputes between Byzantine Greeks, Armenians, and Syriacs in the Empire's eastern provinces. As the balance of power turned, the Seljuqs began capturing major urban centres in Armenia, notably Ani. This set the stage for the calamitous Battle of Manzikert in 1071, which opened the way for the Turkish invasion and the following Byzantine civil war facilitated their conquest of Asia Minor in the following decade.

== Sources ==
- Beihammer, Alexander D. (2011). "Defection across the Border of Islam and Christianity: Apostasy and Cross-Cultural Interaction in Byzantine-Seljuk Relations". Speculum. 86, No. 3 July.
- Beihammer, Alexander Daniel (2017). Byzantium and the Emergence of Muslim-Turkish Anatolia, ca. 1040–1130. New York: Routledge. ISBN 978-1-351-98386-0.
- Blaum, Paul A. (2004). "Diplomacy Gone to Seed: A History of Byzantine Foreign Relations, A.D. 1047–57". International Journal of Kurdish Studies. 18 (1): 1–56. ISSN 1370-7205.
- Cahen, Claude (1968). Pre-Ottoman Turkey: A General Survey of the Material and Spiritual Culture and History. Translated by J. Jones-Williams. New York: Taplinger. OCLC 909838664.
- Felix, Wolfgang (1981). Byzanz und die islamische Welt im früheren 11. Jahrhundert: Geschichte der politischen Beziehungen von 1001 bis 1055 [Byzantium and the Islamic World in the early 11th Century: History of the Political Relationships from 1001 to 1055] (in German). Vienna: Verlag der Österreichischen Akademie der Wissenschaften. ISBN 978-3-7001-0379-0.
- Kaldellis, Anthony (2017). Streams of Gold, Rivers of Blood: The Rise and Fall of Byzantium, 955 A.D. to the First Crusade. New York: Oxford University Press. ISBN 978-0-1902-5322-6.
- Kazhdan, Alexander, ed. (1991). The Oxford Dictionary of Byzantium. Oxford and New York: Oxford University Press. ISBN 0-19-504652-8.
- Leveniotis, Georgios Athanasios (2007). Η πολιτική κατάρρευση του Βυζαντίου στην Ανατολή: το ανατολικό σύνορο και η κεντρική Μικρά Ασία κατά το β' ήμισυ του 11ου αι [The Political Collapse of Byzantium in the East: The Eastern Frontier and Central Asia Minor During the Second Half of the 11th Century] (PhD thesis) (in Greek). Aristotle University of Thessaloniki. doi:10.12681/eadd/19246. hdl:10442/hedi/19246.
- Minorsky, Vladimir (1977) [1953]. Studies in Caucasian History. Cambridge: Cambridge University Press. ISBN 0-521-05735-3.
- Ter-Ghewondyan, Aram (1976) [1965]. The Arab Emirates in Bagratid Armenia. Translated by Garsoïan, Nina. Lisbon: Livraria Bertrand.
- Vryonis, Speros (1971). The Decline of Medieval Hellenism in Asia Minor and the Process of Islamization from the Eleventh through the Fifteenth Century. Berkeley, Los Angeles and London: University of California Press. ISBN 0-520-01597-5.
- Wortley, John, ed. (2010). John Skylitzes: A Synopsis of Byzantine History, 811–1057. Cambridge: Cambridge University Press. ISBN 978-0-521-76705-7.
