= Johann Baptist Weiss =

German historian (1820–1899)

Johann Baptist Weiss (17 July 1820 in Ettenheim, Baden – 8 March 1899 in Graz) was a German historian.

== Life ==
After completing his high-school studies he attended the universities of Freiburg, Tübingen, Heidelberg, and Munich, where he devoted himself to the study of modern languages and history. His first position was that of teacher of French and English at the high-school for the sciences at Freiburg; in 1848 he was appointed by the Government of Baden lecturer on history at the University of Freiburg.

In 1848, the year of revolution, he was a strong adherent of the Catholic party. In 1850 he became editor of the Freiburger Zeitung; in 1852 he became involved in a quarrel with the Government of Baden and, on this account, accepted a call as professor of Austrian history from the University of Graz, where he remained during the years 1853–91.

For a time he was tutor in history to Archduke Charles Louis and the archduke's travelling companion in journeys to France and Constantinople. In 1899 Weiss was ennobled and made a knight on the Order of the Iron Crown. In 1892 he was appointed a life-member of the House of Lords and in 1893 he received the title of court councillor.

== Works ==
Weiss wrote the Geschichte Alfreds des Grossen (Schaffhausen, 1852), careful but unoriginal; he also issued Maria Theresa und der österreichische Erbfolgekrieg (Vienna, 1863). His chief work is his summary of the history of the world in thirty-two volumes, Lehrbuch der Weltgeschichte (last edition, Graz, 1900–06). It extends to the close of the Congress of Vienna and gives special attention to the eighteenth century and the French Revolution, both of which it treats exhaustively on the basis of contemporary literature. The work is written from a distinctly Roman Catholic point of view and is partisan in its account of the conflict between the Empire and the Papacy in the medieval era, of the Protestant Reformation and the Counter-Reformation, and of the Rationalism of the eighteenth century.

Weiss also edited Gfrörer's Geschichte des XVIII. Jahrhunderts (Schaffhausen, 1862–74), and Byzantinische Geschichten (Graz, 1872–74).
