= Shalu Monastery =

Tibetan Buddhist monastery near Shigatse, Tibet, China

Coordinates: 29.12783°N 88.99262°E

- Tibetan transcription(s); Tibetan: ཞྭ་ལུ། Wylie transliteration: Zhwa-lu; Official transcription (China): Xalu; THL: Zhalu; Other transcriptions: Shalu; Chinese transcription(s); Traditional: 夏魯寺; Simplified: 夏鲁寺; Pinyin: Xiàlǔ Sì
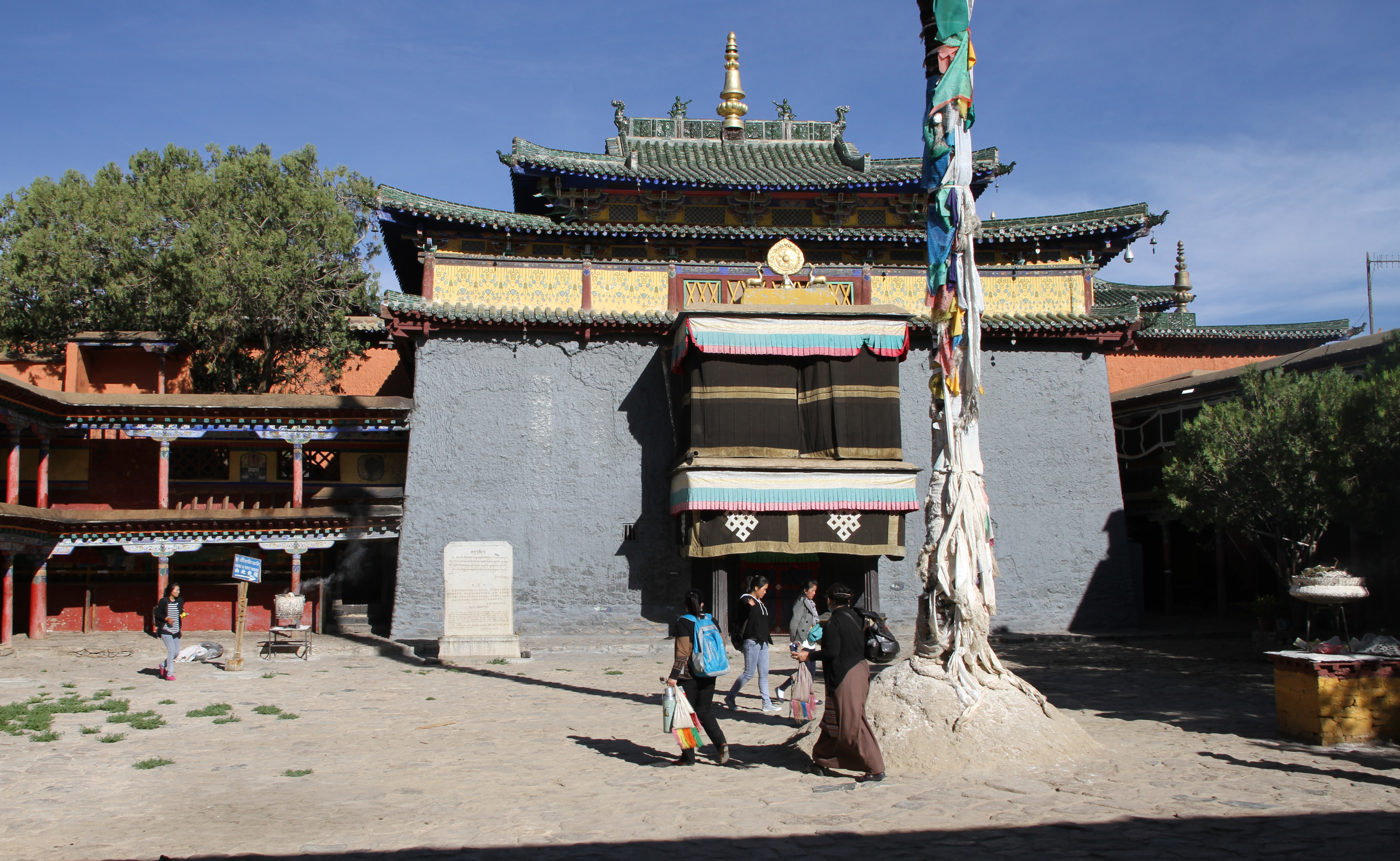

Religion
- Affiliation: Tibetan Buddhism
- Sect: Shalu Sakya

Location
- Location: Shigatse Prefecture, Tibet, China
- Interactive map of Shalu Monastery

Architecture
- Founder: Chetsun Sherab Jungnay
- Completed: 1040; 986 years ago

Shalu Monastery (Tibetan: ཞྭ་ལུ།, Wylie: zhwa lu) is small monastery 22 kilometres (14 mi) south of Shigatse in Tibet. Founded in 1040 by Chetsun Sherab Jungnay, for centuries it was renowned as a centre of scholarly learning and psychic training and its mural paintings were considered to be the most ancient and beautiful in Tibet. Shalu was the first of the major monasteries to be built by noble families of the Tsangpa during Tibet's great revival of Buddhism, and was an important center of the Sakya tradition.

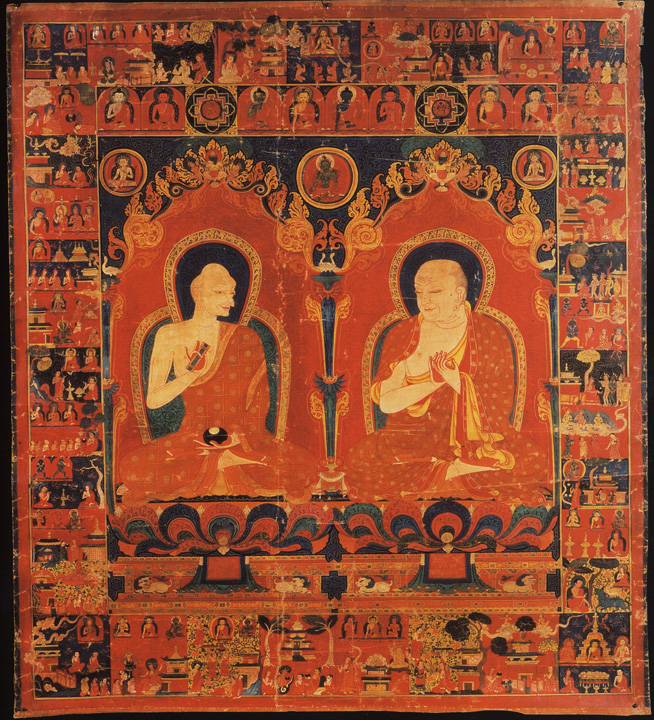
A 14th-century depiction of the 11th abbot of Shalu Buton Rinchen (left) and his successor, a wall painting inside the monastery

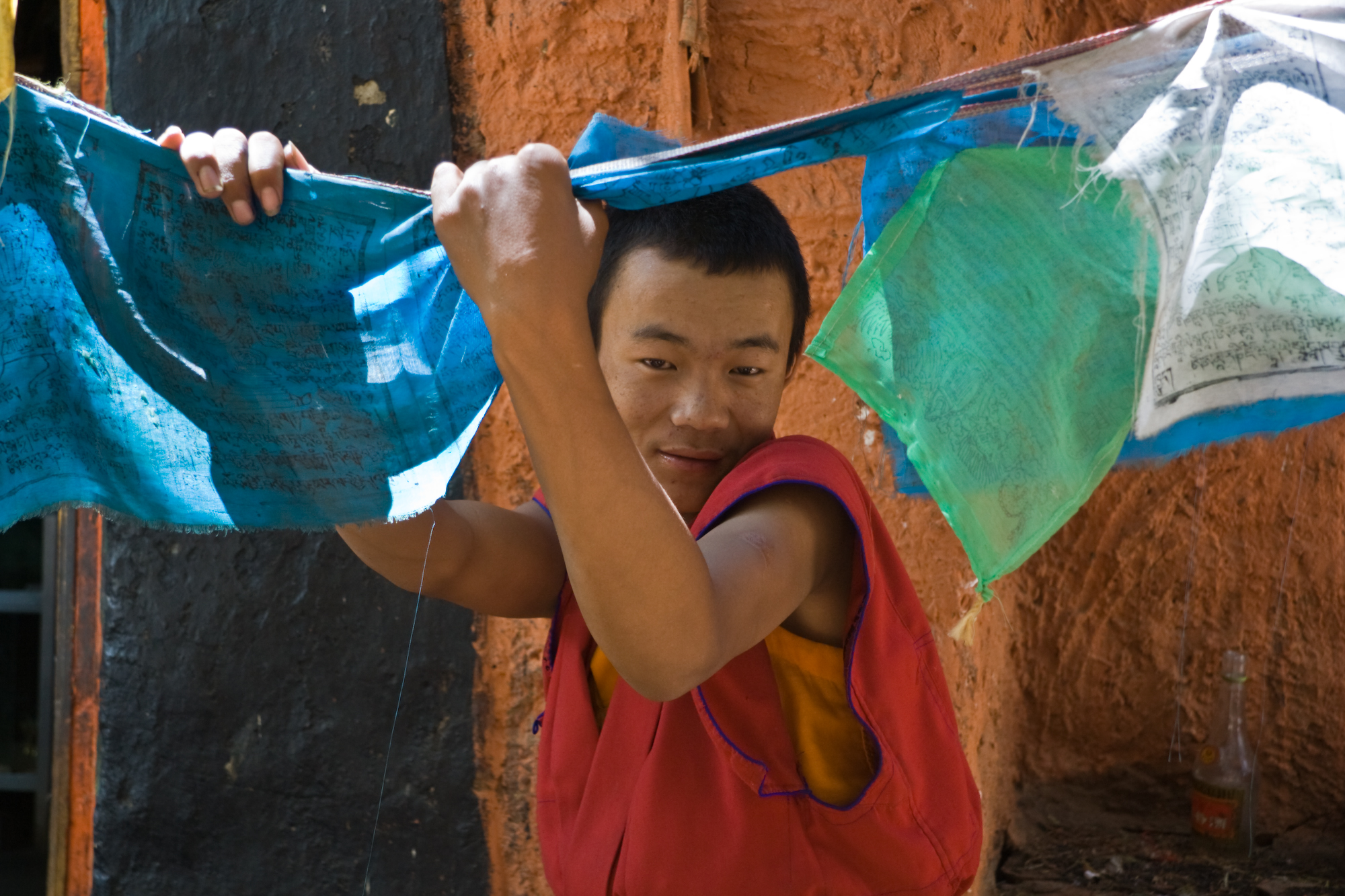
Young Monk in Shalu Monastery, 2006

== Repair and reconstruction ==
Repair and reconstruction of Shalu Monastery began on May 13, 2009, according to the Chinese government Xinhua online news. "The project, one of Tibet's biggest heritage renovation projects under the 11th Five Year Plan (2006–2010), involves reinforcement of its buildings, maintenance of sewage treatment facilities and improvement of fire and flood control systems", a prefectural government official said. It is planned to spend more than 16 million RMB yuan on the project.
