= Johannes of Jerusalem =

Abbot of the monastery at Vézelay, France

Johannes of Jerusalem (1042–1119), born Jehan de Vezelay, a French Catholic religious leader, was the abbot of the monastery at Vézelay, France, as well as one of the founders of Knights Templar. He became a prophet after claiming he discovered a secret at the temple mountain of Jerusalem post-crusade.

== See also ==
- Catholic Church in France
