= August Friedrich Gfrörer =

German historian (1803–1861)

August Friedrich Gfrörer (5 March 1803 – 6 July 1861) was a German historian.

== Biography ==
He was born at Calw, in Württemberg. Obedient to the wishes of his parents, but against his own inclinations, he devoted himself to the study of theology; was a student at the "Little Evangelical Seminary" of Tübingen from 1817–21, and from 1821-25 continued his studies at the higher seminary of the same place. He completed his education by a series of scientific travels through Switzerland and Italy, during part of the time acting as companion and secretary to Charles de Bonstetten, after which he returned to his alma mater.

In 1829, he was appointed vicar in the city of Stuttgart. Having by this time lost all belief in revealed religion, he became convinced that to continue his pastoral duties would involve him in serious conflict; he therefore resigned his vicarage. At the recommendation of Victor von Bonstetten, a friend of his father, he was appointed third librarian of the public library of Stuttgart (1830) with the title of professor. During his numerous hours of leisure he applied himself with vigour and enthusiasm to the study of literature and history.

Around 1846, he was appointed professor of history at the Catholic University of Freiburg (Breisgau). In 1848, he was elected to the German Parliament at Frankfurt as representative of a district of Württemberg; he belonged to the greater German party, and was a fanatical opponent of Prussia. It is a notable fact that, while in Parliament, he proposed a motion for the reunion of Catholics and Protestants, but only on condition that the Holy See would promise never to permit the Jesuits or Redemptorists to settle on German soil.

In 1853 he entered the Catholic Church, after all the other members of his family had taken the same step. He died at Karlsbad in 1861.

== Works ==
The 1913 Catholic Encyclopedia describes Gfrörer as "bold" and "prolific", praising his "great acumen" and "unusual ability", but says that "his literary researches were sometimes lacking in method."

Gfrörer's first major publication was Philo und die judisch-alexandrinische Theosophie (2 vols., Stuttgart, 1831). This work was preparatory to his larger work entitled Kritische Geschichte des Urchristenthums (Stuttgart, 1838, in 5 vols.). In it Gfrörer, probably impelled by David Strauss's Leben Jesu, sought to conceive historically the life and teaching of Christ, and, although writing as a rationalist throughout, he strongly disclaims being "an adherent of the modern champion of negative truths", (i.e. of Strauss).

In the first part, with the sub-title Das Jahr des Heils, he investigates the time in which Christ lived; in the second, entitled Heilige Sage, he treats of the authenticity and literary character of the first three Gospels, and in the third, Das Heiligthum und die Wahrheit, he discusses the Gospel of John. The work, therefore, is a detailed investigation of the character and significance of the New Testament from an historical point of view, and is based on a wealth of materials. At the same time he studied the history of the Thirty Years' War, and in 1835 (in Stuttgart) published Gustav Adolf, König der Schweden und seine Zeit (4th ed., 1863), in which by emphasizing the political role of the Swedish king he took a position diametrically opposed to the views previously held by Protestants.

An equally profound impression, especially in Catholic circles, was produced by his Allgemeine Kirchengeschichte (4 vols., Stuttgart, 1841–46). Closing with the year 1305, it emphasises the part played by the Catholic Church in the development of the German Empire, and extols the policy of the popes.

His later publications are:

- Geschichte der ost- und westfränkischen Karolinger (Freiburg, 1848, 2 vols.)
- Die Urgeschichte des menschlichen Geschlechts (Schaffhausen, 1855, 2 vols., incomplete), which argues that neither critical history nor the natural sciences, in treating of the origin and earliest history of the human race, can lay claim to certainty, when opposed to the earliest traditions of mankind and especially to the Bible
- Papst Gregorius VII und sein Zeitalter (Schaffhausen, 1859–61, in 7 vols.), a part of his Church History, notable for its brilliant scholarship and conscientious research

Many volumes of lectures were published posthumously:

- Geschichte des 18. Jahrhunderts (Schaffhausen, 1862–73; Vols. I-IV by Johann Baptist Weiss; second part of the fourth vol. by Tiedemann, Basle, 1884)
- Zur Geschichte deutscher Volksrechte im Mittelalter (Schaffhausen, 1865, 2 vols.)
- Byzantinische Geschichten (Graz, 1872–74, 2 vols.)

His Prophetae veteres pseudepigraphi latine versi (Stuttgart, 1840), with translation, is critically unsatisfactory.

Gfrörer also translated and edited History of the Jewish War or the downfall of the Jewish people to its capital Jerusalem, by Flavius Josephus (Stuttgart, Leipzig: Rieger, 1836).
