= Artze =

Artze (Armenian: Արծն; Greek: Ἄρτζε) was a town in Medieval Armenia in the 10th–11th centuries.

It was located some 55 km east of the Byzantine city of Theodosiopolis, in the district of Phasiane on the borderlands between Armenia and Iberia, on the left bank of the Araxes River. It is mentioned as the seat of a Byzantine strategos in the Escorial Taktikon (c. 971/975). It was ceded along with other cities to David III of Tao in 979 for his assistance in suppressing the rebellion of Bardas Skleros, but recovered after David's death in 1000, when it became part of the catepanate of Iberia.

The town is chiefly known from the report of John Skylitzes, who writes that it was a popular trade centre, attracting merchants from Syria and Armenia and elsewhere. The town was sacked by the Seljuk Turks in 1048/49, and its surviving inhabitants moved to Theodosiopolis, which they started to call in Armenian Arcn Rum ("Artze of the Romans [i.e., Byzantines]"). From this the later and current name of Theodosiopolis, Erzurum, derives.

Chapter XII of Aristakēs Lastiverc‘i's History is a lengthy lament to the fall of Artze to the Seljuks c. 1045.

Artze should not be confused with the ancient and medieval town of Arzen, which was farther south.

== Sources ==
- Frye, R. N. (1960). "Arzan". In Gibb, H. A. R.; Kramers, J. H.; Lévi-Provençal, E.; Schacht, J.; Lewis, B. & Pellat, Ch. (eds.). The Encyclopaedia of Islam, Second Edition. Volume I: A–B. Leiden: E. J. Brill. pp. 679–680. OCLC 495469456.
- Kazhdan, Alexander, ed. (1991). The Oxford Dictionary of Byzantium. Oxford and New York: Oxford University Press. ISBN 0-19-504652-8.
- Kühn, Hans-Joachim (1991). Die byzantinische Armee im 10. und 11. Jahrhundert: Studien zur Organisation der Tagmata (in German). Vienna: Fassbaender Verlag. ISBN 3-9005-38-23-9.
- Oikonomides, Nicolas (1972). Les listes de préséance byzantines des IXe et Xe siècles (in French). Paris.
