= Chetsun Sherab Jungnay =

Tibetan Abbot and scholar

Chetsun Sherab Jungnay (Tibetan: ལྕེ་བཙུན་ཤེས་རབ་འབྱུང་གནས།, Wylie: Lce-btsun Shes-rab 'Byung-gnas) was an eleventh-century Tibetan Abbot and scholar who founded the Shalu Monastery 22 km south of Shigatse in Tibet. He reportedly found the site to build the temple in 1040 following advice from his tutor to fire an arrow and trust to the goodness and wisdom of Buddha that it will find the perfect location. Where the arrow landed would become the most central point of the foundations of the monastery.
