= 985 =

Calendar year

985 in various calendars
- Gregorian calendar: 985; CMLXXXV
- Ab urbe condita: 1738
- Armenian calendar: 434; ԹՎ ՆԼԴ
- Assyrian calendar: 5735
- Balinese saka calendar: 906–907
- Bengali calendar: 391–392
- Berber calendar: 1935
- Buddhist calendar: 1529
- Burmese calendar: 347
- Byzantine calendar: 6493–6494
- Chinese calendar: 甲申年 (Wood Monkey); 3682 or 3475 — to — 乙酉年 (Wood Rooster); 3683 or 3476
- Coptic calendar: 701–702
- Discordian calendar: 2151
- Ethiopian calendar: 977–978
- Hebrew calendar: 4745–4746
- Hindu calendars
- Vikram Samvat: 1041–1042
- Shaka Samvat: 906–907
- Kali Yuga: 4085–4086
- Holocene calendar: 10985
- Iranian calendar: 363–364
- Islamic calendar: 374–375
- Japanese calendar: Eikan 3 / Kanna 1 (寛和元年)
- Javanese calendar: 886–887
- Julian calendar: 985; CMLXXXV
- Korean calendar: 3318
- Minguo calendar: 927 before ROC 民前927年
- Nanakshahi calendar: −483
- Seleucid era: 1296/1297 AG
- Thai solar calendar: 1527–1528
- Tibetan calendar: ཤིང་ཕོ་སྤྲེ་ལོ་ (male Wood-Monkey); 1111 or 730 or −42 — to — ཤིང་མོ་བྱ་ལོ་ (female Wood-Bird); 1112 or 731 or −41

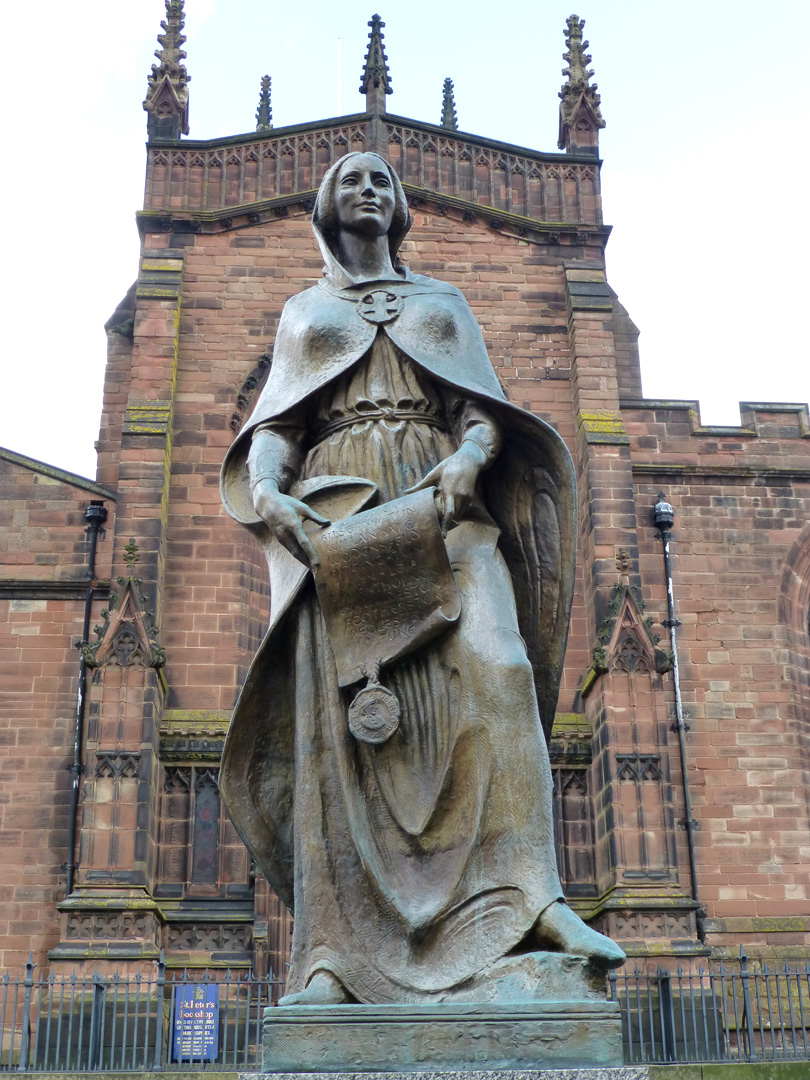
Statue of Lady Wulfrun (c. 935–1005)

Year 985 (CMLXXXV) was a common year starting on Thursday of the Julian calendar.

== Events ==
=== By place ===
==== Europe ====
- Summer – Henry II (the Wrangler) is restored as duke of Bavaria by Empress Theophanu and her mother-in-law Adelaide at an Hoftag assembly in Rohr (Thuringia). King Otto III (5-years old) remains under the regency of the two empresses in the Holy Roman Empire and in the Kingdom of Italy.
- Battle of Fýrisvellir: King Eric the Victorious defeats a Swedish Viking army under Styrbjörn the Strong (his nephew) near Uppsala.
- July 6 – The city of Barcelona is sacked by Moorish troops under Al-Mansur, the de facto ruler of Al-Andalus (modern-day Spain).

==== England ====
- Lady Wulfrun, an Anglo-Saxon noblewoman, is granted land by King Æthelred II (the Unready). She founds Heantune that later becomes the city of Wolverhampton in the West Midlands.

==== Asia ====
- Raja Raja Chola I (considered by many as the greatest emperor of the Chola Empire) becomes ruler of the Chola Dynasty. During his reign he expands his domains beyond South India.

=== By topic ===
==== Exploration ====
- Greenland is colonized by the Icelandic Viking Erik the Red (according to legend, but has been established as approximately correct – see History of Greenland).

==== Religion ====
- July 20 – Anti-Pope Boniface VII dies under suspicious circumstances at Rome. He is succeeded by John XV as the 137th pope of the Catholic Church.
- Amalfitan Benedictines found the only Latin Christian monastery on Mount Athos with the support of John the Iberian. The monastery will last until 1287.

== Births ==
- August 13 – Al-Hakim bi-Amr Allah, Fatimid caliph (d. 1021)
- Adalbert, margrave of Austria (approximate date)
- Boniface III, margrave of Tuscany (approximate date)
- Gilbert Buatère, Norman nobleman (approximate date)
- Gisela (or Gizella), queen of Hungary (d. 1065)
- John Gualbert, Italian monk and abbot (d. 1073)
- Hamza ibn 'Ali ibn-Ahmad, founding leader of the Druze
- Maria of Amalfi, Lombard duchess and regent
- Osmond Drengot, Norman nobleman (approximate date)
- Pilgrim, archbishop of Cologne (approximate date)
- Radbot, German nobleman (approximate date)
- Rodulfus Glaber, French monk and chronicler (d. 1047)
- Theobald II, French nobleman (approximate date)
- Wazo, bishop of Liège (approximate date)
- Zhao Yuanyan, prince of the Song Dynasty (d. 1044)

== Deaths ==
- January 31 – Ryōgen, Japanese monk and abbot (b. 912)
- June 26 – Ramiro III, king of León (Spain) (b. 961)
- July 20 – Boniface VII, antipope of the Catholic Church
- August 25 – Dietrich of Haldensleben, German margrave
- Basil Lekapenos, Byzantine chief minister (b. 925)
- Chen Hongjin, Chinese warlord and general (b. 914)
- Herbert III (the Old), Frankish nobleman (b. 910)
- Hywel ap Ieuaf, king of Gwynedd (Wales)
- Judith, duchess regent of Bavaria (b. 925)
- Kishi Joō, Japanese female waka poet (b. 929)
- Marzuban ibn Muhammad, Shaddadid emir
- Muirgus mac Domnaill, king of Uí Maine (Ireland)
- Rikdag, margrave of Meissen (Germany)
- Tornike Eristavi, Georgian general and monk
- Harold II (Bluetooth), king of Denmark and Norway
