= Peter de Honestis =

Peter de Honestis (c. 1049 – 29 March 1119) was born at Ravenna. Among his distant relatives was Romuald, founder of the Camaldolese monks. All his life Peter fasted on Saturday in honour of Our Lady, and strongly recommended this practice to his religious.

== Life ==
He lived for some years in the Holy Land. When returning home, a great storm arose in the Adriatic and the ship was in imminent danger of destruction; Peter made a vow to build a church in honour of Our Lady should he safely reach the harbour. In fulfilment of his promise, in 1096 he built a church and the monastery of Santa Maria in Portofuori on the family property. Nearby there was a small community of clerics, and Peter having joined them, was soon after made their superior, and with them removed to the church and monastery he had built, in 1099.

His name is associated with the sodality called "The Children of Mary", established in honour of a miraculous picture of Our Lady, now called "Madonna Greca", which tradition says came from Constantinople. One of the first to join was Matilda of Tuscany. This sodality predated by some 400 years the one founded by the Jesuits at the Roman College.

The number of his religious increasing, Peter gave them some statutes grounded on the rule of St. Augustine. These were approved by Pope Paschal II in 1116, and having afterwards been adopted by many other communities of Canons Regular, the Portuensis Congregation was formed.

By common consent Peter has always been called "Blessed". In former times his office and feast used to be celebrated at Ravenna.
