= Budo (courtier) =

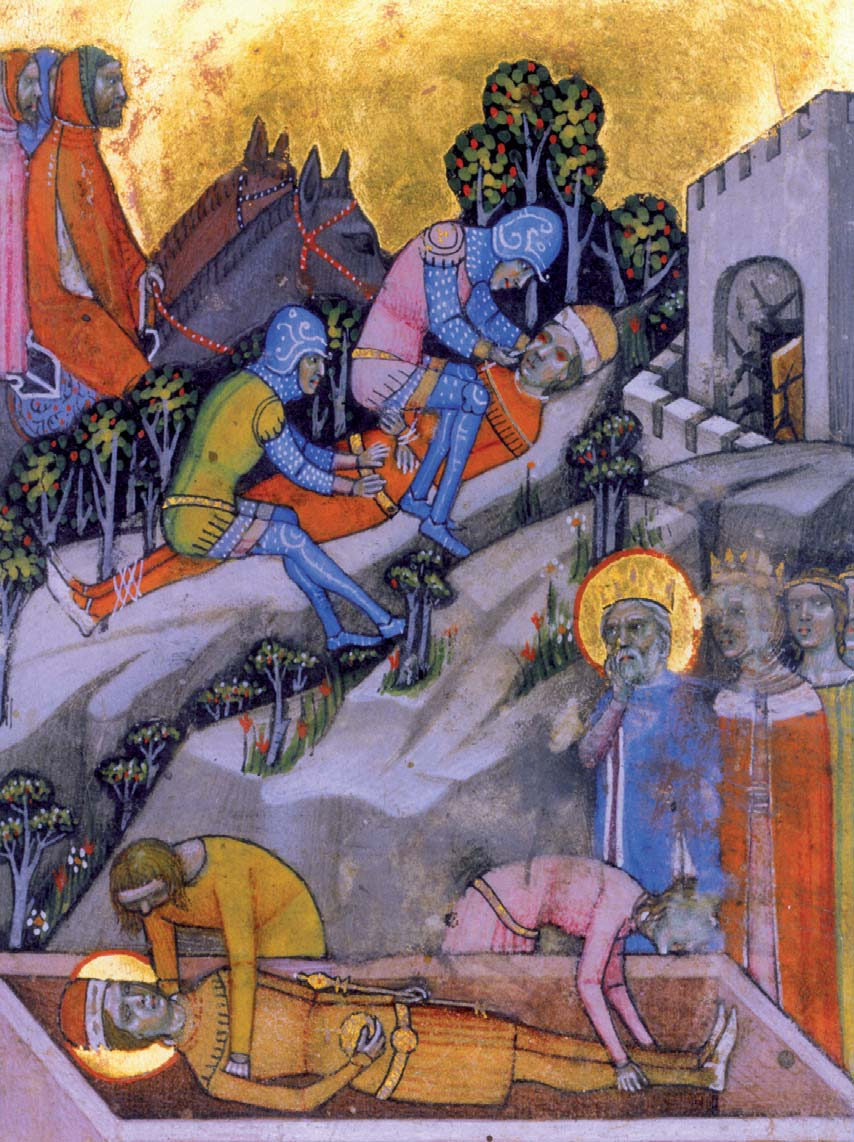
- Budo as King Stephen's envoy (in red dress in the upper left corner) during the blinding of Vazul (1031), as depicted in the Illuminated Chronicle
- Born: 10th century
- Died: September 1041; Esztergom (?), Kingdom of Hungary
- Issue: three sons, including Sebes
- Father: Egiruth

Budo (Hungarian: Buda; died September 1041) was a Hungarian royal advisor and courtier in the 11th century. He rose to prominence by the 1030s, the last decade of Stephen I's reign. According to the Illuminated Chronicle, he played a key role in choosing Peter Orseolo as heir to the throne, and was an influential advisor to him after his coronation.

== Name ==
His father was a certain Egiruth. Based on their names, Budo was of German ancestry (the Annales Altahenses refers to him in this form). The Illuminated Chronicle preserved a Magyarized variant (Buda) of his name. Hungarian historian György Györffy, who considered that courtiers named Buda who appeared in the 1030s and 1040s are all different people, argued that "buda" is in fact a title of a royal courtier (missus) derives from the German bote/boto/bodo. Refusing this standpoint, Iván Uhrman emphasized that Budo only appears as a court envoy in 1031, and the former dignity titles have been transformed into personal names by the 11th century.

Since the fact that his son Sebes was adult by the 1030s, Budo was born in the last decades of the 10th century. It is possible that the future capital Buda was named after Budo, who was perhaps the first count (ispán) of the royal estate there.

== Career ==
=== Conspiracy against Vazul ===
Meanwhile his [Stephen's] bodily strength began to fail, and feeling himself overcome with a great lassitude he sent in haste a messenger, namely Buda, the son of Egiruth, charging him that Vazul, the son of his uncle, should be taken from the prison of Nitra where the king had shut him up that he might amend his youthful wantonness and folly, and should be brought to him in order that before his death he might appoint him king. Hearing this, Queen Gisela contrived a plan with Buda, who was an evil man, and in the greatest haste she sent a messenger, whose name was Sebus, son of that same Buda, to the prison in which Vazul was held. Arriving there before the messenger of the king, Sebus put out Vazul's eyes and filled the cavities of his ears with lead, and fled to Bohemia.

— Illuminated Chronicle

By the early 1030s, Budo became an influential advisor in the royal court. When Emeric, the heir and only son of King Stephen I died in a hunting accident in September 1031, uncertainty arose regarding the succession to the throne. Stephen's cousin, Vazul – who had the strongest claim to succeed him – was suspected of an inclination towards paganism. According to the Annales Altahenses, the monarch disregarded his cousin's claim and nominated his nephew, the Venetian Peter Orseolo, as his heir. To ensure this, Vazul, who, according to Stephen's legenda minor, attempted an assassination attempt against the king, was captured and blinded, and his three sons, Levente, Andrew and Béla, were expelled from Hungary. The succession dispute, the alleged assassination attempt and ultimately Vazul's blinding (and, thus, Budo's involvement) as a series of events occurred sometime between 1032 and 1037.

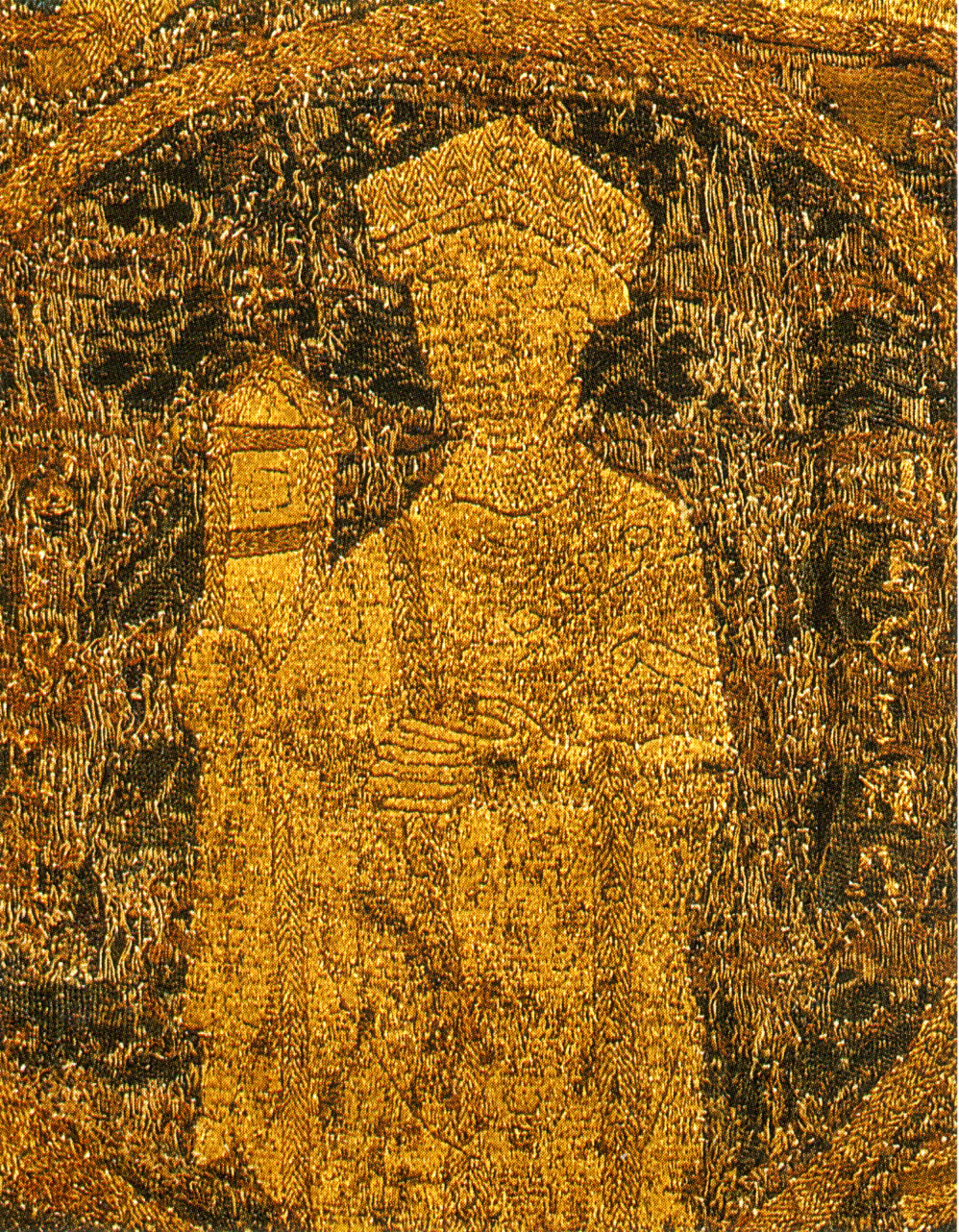
Portrayal of Queen Gisela on the Hungarian coronation pall (chasuble) from 1031

The Hungarian chronicle text, including the Illuminated Chronicle, written under kings descending from Vazul's line, narrates a contrasting report on the events. Accordingly, Stephen initially was planning to nominate Vazul as his heir, but Vazul's enemies, including the queen, Gisela hatched a plot to hinder the king's plans. When Stephen I sent his envoy Budo to hurry up and release Vazul, who was being held prisoner in the Nitra Castle, Budo, instead, informed Gisela about the king's plan. Thereafter, they sent Budo's son, Sebes, ahead to Nitra, where he blinded and mutilated Vazul, then fled to Bohemia before the king's delegation led by Budo arrived. The Illuminated Chronicle also narrates that after the death of Stephen I in 1038, "Queen Gisela together with Buda, her assistant in crime, determined to appoint as king the queen's brother [sic], Peter the German or rather Venetian, with the intention that Queen Gisela might then according to her desire fulfill all the impulses of her will, and that the kingdom of Hungary might lose its liberty and be subjected without hindrance to the dominion of the Germans". Historians Gyula Kristó and György Györffy believed that Stephen's envoy and Gisela's evil advisor both named Buda were two different people. However, this could be resolved by the queen "hearing" her husband's will from Budo, and as a result, they would conspired against Vazul.

The text of the Hungarian chronicle is burdened with later additions and modifications, which aimed to nullify Stephen's responsibility in blinding Vazul and choosing Peter. While the Annales Altahenses preserved a close-to-realistic course of events, the redaction of the chronicle text blamed Queen Gisela and the "evil advisor" Budo. According to Gyula Kristó, this narration developed in two steps: a chronicle from the late 12th to early 13th century placed the responsibility on Budo, and then a subsequent historian pointed to the queen as the driving force behind the events, reflecting on his own time, the unpopular Gertrude. Péter Váczy argued that Budo was a devoted and reliable confidant of Stephen I, who intended to completely fulfill the king's order, i.e. to secure Peter's claim to the throne, in whom the elderly monarch saw the preservation of the Christian state-building traditions.

=== Peter's confidant ===
Seeing this, the chief men of that realm unanimously agreed to kill one of his [Peter's] followers, named Budo, the cause of all these troubles, since he had done everything according to his advice, since his mindset was in harmony with his own. So they came to the king and persistently asked him to sentence that man to death as a common enemy of all of them, who was seeking the destruction of his own realm and its inhabitants. And the king, seeing that he himself was in trouble and could not help him, is said to have replied: "Since I cannot save him, I do not want to hand him over to death, but I will not refuse him from you either." As soon as they heard this, they immediately seized him [Budo] and cut him to pieces and killed him, and they gouged out the eyes of his two little children.

— Annales Altahenses

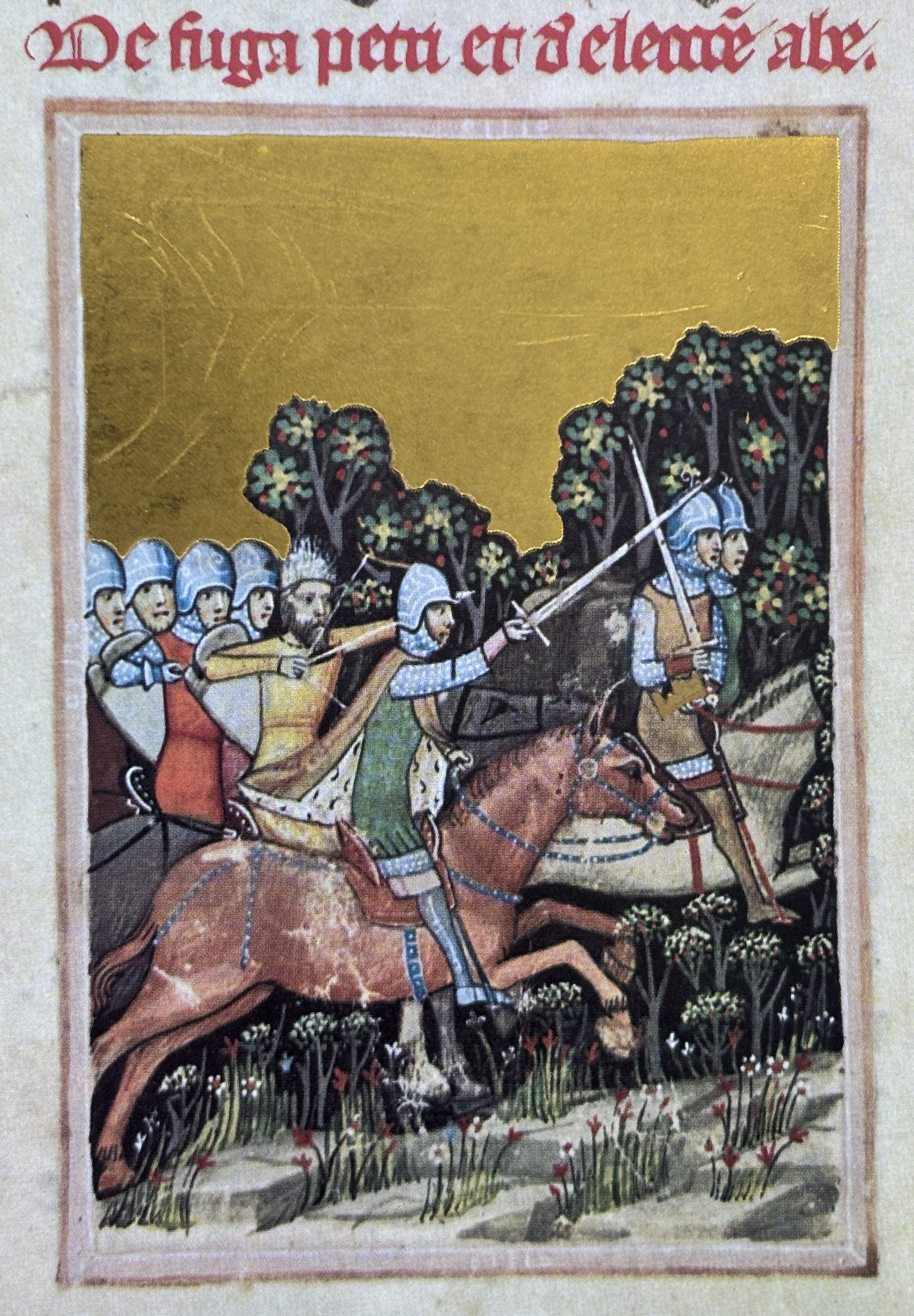
The expulsion of Peter, King of Hungary as depicted in the 14th-century Illuminated Chronicle

Peter Orseolo succeeded King Stephen I, who died on 15 August 1038, without resistance. Both the Annales Altahenses and the Illuminated Chronicle refer to Budo as the new monarch's most trusted and influential advisor. Peter's rule quickly became unpopular domestically. Chronicles recount that he preferred the company of Germans and Italians which made him unpopular among his subjects. He introduced new taxes, seized Church revenue, deposed two bishops and even confiscated the dowager queen Gisela's property and took her into custody. Historian Albin F. Gombos argued that Peter's only real mistake was that, while he focused excessively on foreign policy and wars, he entrusted the management of domestic politics to Budo, who abused this. György Györffy characterized Budo as a courtier who "was not a calm, impartial advisor. He had a role in blinding Vazul, and therefore became the target of the hatred of the Hungarian dynastic party, and he could not even feel safe for his own life as long as the Vazul sons waited in the neighborhood for their hour to come". According to Péter Váczy, Budo became the personification of the "evil counselor" and a "scapegoat" in later narrative texts due to the events. Iván Uhrman argued that Budo consistently tried to fulfill the task entrusted to him by the late Stephen and only realized late, or not at all, that Peter was not preserving, but rather destroying, the legacy of his great predecessor.

In September 1041, as a result, a group of magnates led by Ztoizla (Toyzlau), Pezili (Pezli) and Visca (Wisce) conspired against the king and removed Peter from power in a palace coup. The Annales Altahenses narrates that, out of fear, Peter allowed the rebels to brutally execute Budo and his family (see above) before fleeing with few of his men to Bavaria. According to this narrative, the deposition was mostly bloodless, with only Budo killed. The Illuminated Chronicle writes that the rebels elected their king Samuel Aba, when Peter was still in Hungary and a regular war broke out between the two claimants. Before his defeat, Peter was able to flee to Bavaria, and the Hungarian rebels "seized that most wicked, bearded Buda, the promoter of all evil, by whose counsel Peter had afflicted Hungary, and they killed him by cutting him to pieces, and they put out the eyes of his two sons. They also killed Sebus [also Budo's son], who had put out the eyes of Vazul, by breaking his hands and feet. Some they stoned and others they beat to death with iron rods".

As a result of the 1042–1044 German campaigns into Hungary, Samuel Aba was killed and Peter Orseolo was reinstated as king of Hungary in July 1044. Peter accepted Henry III's suzerainty during his second reign. A number of plots to overthrow him indicate that he remained unpopular; the Illuminated Chronicle narrates that the late Stephen's maternal cousins – Bolya and Bonyha, the sons of Gyula III – conspired with Visca, Samuel Aba's former confidant against Peter and intended to invite the exiled sons of Vazul to return Hungary. However, "from the whisperings of traitors, namely Buda and Devecser, Peter learned that the aforesaid nobles, namely Visca, Bua and Buhna, and their kindred, were planning how they could restore the kingdom to the royal seed and bring back Andrew, Béla and Levente into the kingdom against King Peter. King Peter raged in fury, and he ordered them to be seized and placed upon the rack and killed; others he caused to be tortured and blinded". Iván Uhrman considered that this Buda identical with Budo, whose brutal execution thus actually took place during the second reign of Peter, amidst the events of the Vata pagan uprising in 1046 when Peter was finally ousted from power.

== Sources ==
=== Primary sources ===
- Bak, János M.; Veszprémy, László; Kersken, Norbert (2018). Chronica de gestis Hungarorum e codice picto saec. XIV [The Illuminated Chronicle: Chronicle of the deeds of the Hungarians from the fourteenth-century illuminated codex]. Budapest: Central European University Press. ISBN 978-9-6338-6264-3.

=== Secondary sources ===
- Györffy, György (2013). István király és műve [King Stephen and his work] (in Hungarian). Balassi Kiadó. ISBN 978-963-506-896-8.
- Kristó, Gyula (1999). Az államalapítás korának írott forrásai [Written Sources of the Ages of the Foundation of the State] (in Hungarian). Szegedi Középkorász Műhely. ISBN 963-482-393-9.
- Pauler, Gyula (1899). A magyar nemzet története az Árpád-házi királyok alatt, I. [The History of the Hungarian Nation during the Árpádian Kings, Vol. 1.] (in Hungarian). Athenaeum.
- Uhrman, Iván (2010). "Az utolsó törzsfő vagy az első parasztvezér? Az úgynevezett Vata-felkelés [The Last Chieftain or the First Peasant Leader? The so-called Vata Uprising]". Hadtörténelmi Közlemények (in Hungarian). 123 (1–2). Hadtörténeti Intézet és Múzeum: 44–112. ISSN 0017-6540.
