= Xiao Guanyin =

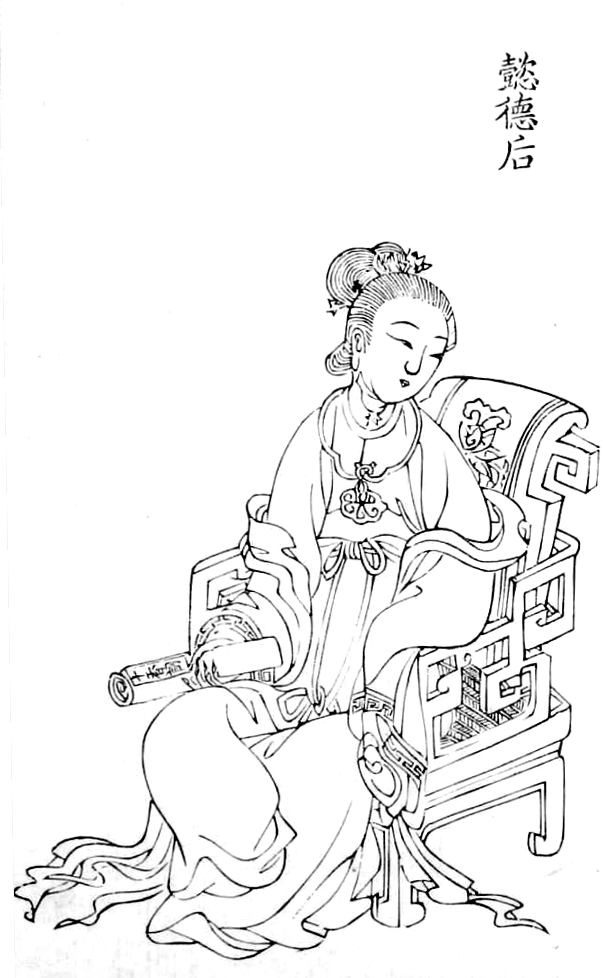

Empress consort of the Liao dynasty
- Tenure: 1055–13 December 1075
- Successor: Xiao Tansi
- Born: 1040
- Died: December 13, 1075 (aged 34–35)
- Burial: Qing Mausoleum (慶陵)
- Spouse: Emperor Daozong of Liao
- Issue: Yelü Jun; Yelü Sagezhi; Yelü Jiuli; Yelü Teli
- Father: Xiao Hui
- Mother: Yelü Shuogu

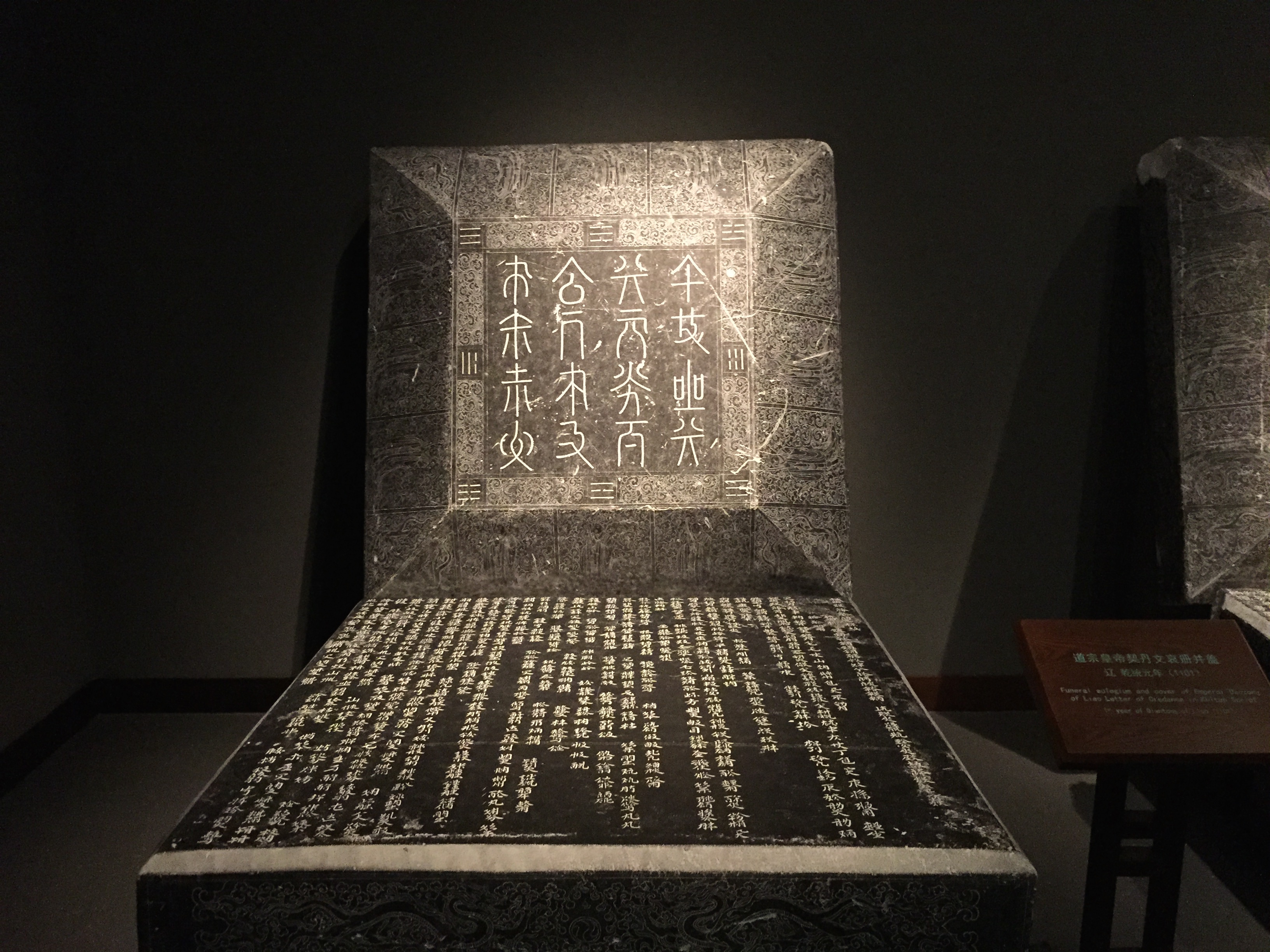
Epitaph for Empress Xuanyi

Xiao Guanyin (Chinese: 蕭觀音; 1040–13 December 1075), known as the Empress Yide (懿德皇后) during her tenure from 1055 to 1075, and as Empress Xuanyi (宣懿皇后) after her death, was an empress consort of the Liao dynasty of China, married to her cousin Emperor Daozong. She was falsely accused of adultery and forced to commit suicide.

Xiao Guanyin was described as "exceedingly beautiful". A sinicized Khitan, she was a pipa virtuoso and wrote songs as well as Chinese poetry. Fourteen of her poems have survived, which have all been translated into English.

== Biography ==
Xiao Guanyin was the daughter of Xiao Hui and Yelü Shuogu. Yelü Shuogu was the daughter of Xiao Noujin and Emperor Shengzong of Liao, and Xiao Hui was the brother of Xiao Noujin - an ambitious woman who was involved in the murder of a former Empress Dowager and a plot to overthrow her son, Emperor Xingzong. She's named after Guanyin, the bodhisattva of compassion.

Xiao Guanyin had an affection for fine arts, and she was a skilled pipa player and music composer, and excelled in debate. She also wrote several poems and was chosen by Yelü Hongji as his consort. She gave birth to three daughters, Yelü Sagezhi (耶律撒葛只), Yelü Jiuli (耶律糾里), and Yelü Teli (耶律特里). She later gave birth to a son named Yelü Jun (耶律浚), who would become the Crown Prince. When Yelü Hongji became Emperor, Xiao Guanyin would receive the title of Empress Yide.

The Empress was known to be virtuous and wise. When Yelü Zhongyuan's wife allured other men, Xiao Guanyin warned her that she was wed to the Emperor's uncle. Despite Xiao Guanyin's beauty, the Emperor distanced from her and she composed several poems out of sadness. She told a court musician named Zhao Weiyi to play for her and his music was intricate and deliberate. Many servants heard the music and spread rumors that the Empress and Zhao Weiyi had an affair. An official named Yelü Yixin would later use these rumors to bring the Empress's downfall.

In the court, Xiao Guanyin's son the Crown Prince was benevolent and righteous, and was heavily involved in political affairs. A corrupt official named Yelü Yixin (耶律乙辛) feared the influence Xiao Guanyin had on her son and the Emperor and plotted to have her removed. He conspired with a palace maid named Dancheng (單登), who feared and despised Xiao Guanyin. Dancheng knew how to play the zither and was one day noticed by the Emperor. However, the Empress told the Emperor that Dancheng was the daughter of a rebel and she would possibly take revenge one day. The Emperor then distanced himself from her, and any signs of taking Dancheng as a concubine disappeared. Dancheng also lost to Zhao Weiyi on a music examination, and blamed this on the Empress's bias towards Zhao Weiyi. She then began to complain to her friend, who was also the mistress of Yelü Yixin.

To revenge herself, Dancheng tricked the empress into writing a love poem, and Yelü Yixin presented the poem to Emperor Daozong. Yelü Yixin insisted that the poem contained hidden messages that the empress was having an affair with another man. The Emperor believed Yelü Yixin, and Yelü Yixin and another official named Zhang Xiaojie subjected Xiao Guanyin and Zhao Weiyi to numerous forms of torture. Dancheng spied on them during this period, but couldn't find any conclusive evidence. They refused to admit they had a love affair but were executed. Her body would be sent back to the Xiao family.

Yelü Yixin then went on to execute the crown prince and any other officials he did not like. Eventually, Emperor Daozong caught on, and began to take away Yelü Yixin's privileges one by one. Yelü Yixin then attempted to defect to Song, but was caught in the process; he was finally executed in 1083 AD, but the damage he had done to the empire was already done. Emperor Daozong eventually instigated a new Empress named Xiao Tansi, but she was reduced to the title of Consort Hui. After Tansi's mother tried to seduce the Prince of Yan, Dansi was further reduced to commoner status. Xiao Guanyin's grandson born to Yelü Jun would later ascend to the throne as Emperor Tianzuo, the last Emperor of the Liao Dynasty.
