= Leo Tornikios =

Byzantine general and noble

- Born: Adrianople (modern-day Edirne, Turkey)
- Died: Unknown
- Military career
- Titles: Patrikios, doux
- Conflicts: Siege of Constantinople, 1047

Leo Tornikios (Greek: Λέων Τορνίκιος) was a mid-11th century Byzantine general and noble. In 1047, he rebelled against his cousin, the Byzantine Emperor Constantine IX Monomachos (r. 1042–1055). He raised an army in Thrace and marched on the capital, Constantinople, which he besieged. After two failed assaults he withdrew, his army deserted him and he was captured. At Christmas 1047, he was blinded and no more is known of him.

== Biography ==
Map of the Byzantine Empire 22 years prior to Tornikios' revolt. Boundaries were largely unchanged except for the area around Ani, in the north east, having been formally annexed.

Leo Tornikios was born in Adrianople, the scion of the noted noble Armenian or Georgian family of Tornikios. His contemporary, Michael Psellos, describes him as "short, crafty, proud and ambitious". According to Psellos, "he reeked of Macedonian arrogance".

Although favoured by his relative, Constantine IX, Tornikios soon came to support the Emperor's sister, Euprepia, who opposed the Emperor's policies and frequently compared him favourably with the Emperor. He was named patrikios and military commander (doux) of a province on the eastern frontier of Byzantine territory. This was either Melitene according to Michael Attaleiates, or Iberia according to Psellos. During Leo's tenure in the east, a revolt broke out in the army in Thrace, which had its headquarters at Adrianople, 240 kilometres (150 mi) west of the capital, Constantinople. Fearful of Tornikios' popularity among the military aristocracy, Constantine swiftly recalled him to Constantinople, where he was tonsured but otherwise left free.

=== Rebellion and siege of Constantinople ===
Taking advantage of this freedom, he fled the capital to Adrianople on September 14, 1047, delaying pursuit by slaughtering the horses at each post station. In Adrianople he gathered supporters, including a number of disgruntled generals. He claimed that Constantine was dead and offered to lead them. The army proclaimed him emperor, its commanders raising him on a shield in the traditional manner. They then marched against the capital and set up camp opposite the walls of Constantinople on September 25, 1047.

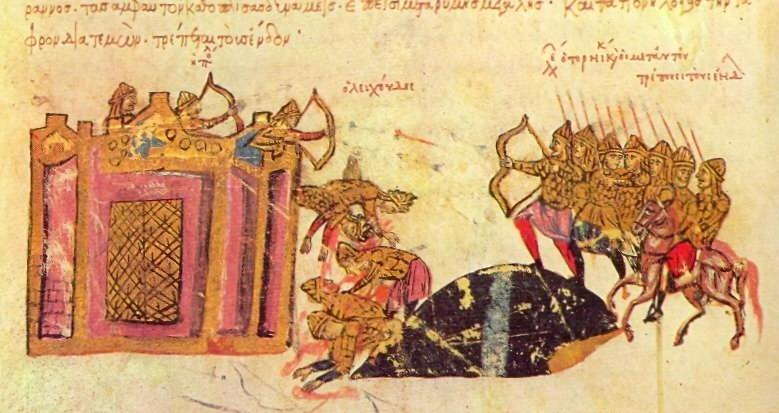
Tornikios' attack against Constantinople, from the Madrid Skylitzes

The Byzantine bureaucracy distrusted the military aristocracy and had been systematically undermining it, for example removing the day-to-day running of the military forces of each province from the traditionally aristocratic strategoi and giving it to the civil magistrates (praetors). Emperor Constantine belonged to this bureaucratic faction, and had been actively reducing the size of the army during the five years since he had come to the throne. This was a major cause of the unrest in Thrace and of Tornikios' own dissatisfaction. More importantly, this infighting had devastated the army's effectiveness. The nearest useful, loyal military force was the army of Anatolia, posted to Iberia to guard the frontier. Constantine was therefore forced to rely on Saracen mercenaries, civilians and paroled convicts to defend the city.

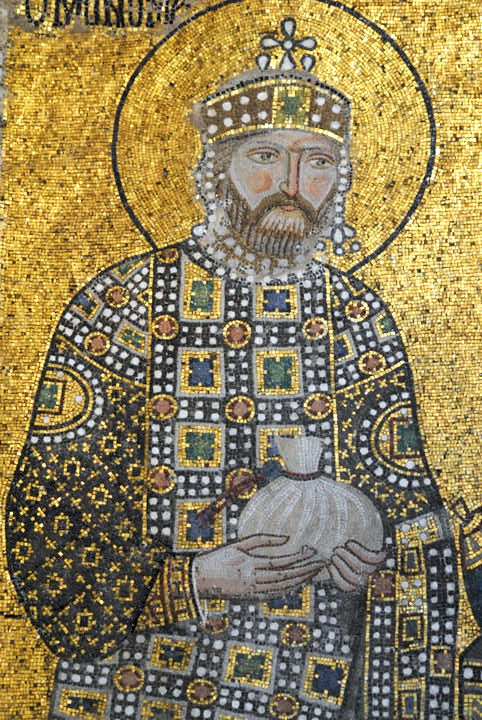
A Hagia Sophia mosaic of Constantine IX, Tornikios' uncle

A force of armed citizens sallied out to meet Tornikios but was easily defeated. This spread panic among the capital's defenders, who abandoned their posts on the walls and their gates. Tornikios, however, instead of storming the unmanned walls, hesitated. Contemporary historian, Psellus, wrote: "He was confidently awaiting our invitation to assume the throne: he assumed that he would be led to the palace by flaming torches, in a procession worthy of a sovereign." Modern historian Norwich speculates: "Perhaps he wanted to spare a city he believed soon to be his from pillage". Whatever his reasons, he lost his opportunity to take the city, for that night, Emperor Constantine managed to restore order and re-occupy the walls, to await the arrival of the Anatolian army. The next morning, Constantine, dressed in full imperial regalia, installed himself in a position where all of the besieging army could see him, giving the lie to Tornikios' claim that he was dead.

The siege lasted from September 25 to 28. Two assaults by Tornikios' men were turned back by the defenders on the walls under the personal leadership of Emperor Constantine, who, despite suffering from severe gout and arthritis, and having no military experience, showed courage and energy in defence of the city. On one occasion an arrow struck and killed a lieutenant standing by his side and his attendants pulled him away. Following the failure of their assaults Tornikios' men were disillusioned, having expected an easy victory. Constantine sent agents to their camps to bribe them to desert, and they met with some success. In desperation Tornikios approached the walls himself to appeal directly to the defenders. He was met by a hail of missiles. Thwarted, he withdrew his army westwards in early October.

=== Defeat ===
Hoping to retrieve the situation, he attacked the town of Rhaidestos but was again repulsed. At this point many of his remaining followers deserted. The army of Anatolia arrived at Constantinople and set out in pursuit, causing his few remaining supporters to abandon him. By the time he was run to ground at a church in Boulgarophygon, he had a single adherent, a minor noble named John Vatatzes. Tornikios attempted to claim sanctuary, but was lured out of the church and captured.

At Christmas 1047, in Constantinople, he suffered the traditional fate of Byzantine rebels and was publicly blinded, along with Vatatzes. Nothing further is known about him.

== Consequences ==
The revolt weakened Byzantine defences in the Balkans and, in 1048, the area was raided by the Pechenegs, who continued to plunder it for the next five years. While the Anatolian army was away from the eastern frontier, the neighbouring Seljuk Turks took advantage to launch a large scale raid into Byzantine Armenia. Unopposed, they captured Artze, "a city of 800 churches and immense wealth". Its sack is evidenced by contemporary reports of 150,000 dead. This was the first major, successful Turkish raid into eastern Byzantine territory. They subsequently became nearly annual events, culminating 24 years later in the Battle of Manzikert, when the Byzantine army was crushed and the Emperor captured.

== Sources ==
- Bréhier, Louis (1946). Le monde byzantin: Vie et mort de Byzance (PDF) (in French). Paris, France: Éditions Albin Michel. OCLC 490176081.
- Encyclopædia Britannica. Vol. 6. London: William Benton. 1964. OCLC 14609512.
- Finlay, George (1906) [1853]. History of the Byzantine Empire from 716–1057. London: William Blackwood & Sons. OCLC 459585297.
- Haldon, John (2001). The Byzantine Wars: Battles and Campaigns of the Byzantine Era. Stroud: Tempus. ISBN 978-0-7524-1795-0.
- Kazhdan, Alexander, ed. (1991). The Oxford Dictionary of Byzantium. Oxford and New York: Oxford University Press. ISBN 0-19-504652-8.
- Kurkjian, Vahan M. (1964) [1958]. A History of Armenia. New York: Armenian General Benevolent Union of America. OCLC 889896040.
- Norwich, John (1991). Byzantium: the Apogee. London: Penguin. ISBN 978-0-670-80252-4.
- Ostrogorsky, George (1957). History of The Byzantine State. New Brunswick: Rutgers University Press. OCLC 422217218.
