= Annales Altahenses =

Medieval German annals

The Annales Altahenses (also known as Annals of Altaich or Annals of Niederaltaich) was an early medieval royal annals compiled in the Niederaltaich Abbey, which contains records of the events of almost all years in the period between 708 and 1073.

Wilhelm von Giesebrecht published a Jahrbücher des Klosters Altaich (1841), reconstructing the lost Annales Altahenses, of which only fragments were known to exist, obscurely included within other chronicles. However in 1867, a copy of the original chronicle was found, showing that Giesebrecht's reconstructed text was substantially correct.

== Sources ==
- Dunphy, Graeme (2010). Encyclopedia of the Medieval Chronicle. Brill. ISBN 978-9004184640.
