= Cenn Fáelad Ua Cúill =

Irish poet

Ceaunfaeladh ua Cuill (died 1048) was an Irish poet who held the post of Chief Ollam of Ireland. He belonged to the family of O’Cuill who were hereditary poets in Munster. Only the Annals of Inisfallen term him Chief Ollam of Ireland. The other annals just describe him as Chief Poet of Munster but it was possible to hold both roles. A poem of his still exists in 160 verses beginning “Teach suain na horchra an aird tiar” (“House of rest, of sorrow in the west”), about the death of Eoghan, the grand-nephew of King Brian Boru, who was killed in the battle of Ossory in 1027.

== Obituaries ==
- His obituary is given in the Annals of Inisfallen as follows: “AI1048.5 Ua Cuill, chief poet of Ireland, died, fortified by Communion and [the] Sacrifice [of the Mass].”
- His obit is given in the Annals of the Four Masters as follows: “M1048.10 Ceannfaeladh Ua Cuill, chief poet of Munster died”.
- His obit is given in the Annals of Ulster as follows: “U1048.2 Cenn Faelad ua Cuill, chief poet of Mumu, died.”
- His obit is given in the Annals of Loch Cé as follows: “LC1048.1 Cendfaeladh O'Cuill, chief poet of Mumha mortuus sunt.”
- His obit is given in the Annals of Tigernach as follows: “T1048.5 Cend Faeladh h-úa Cuill, ollam Muman mortuus est.”
- His obit is given in the Chronicon Scotorum as follows: “Annal CS1048 Kalends. Cennfaeladh ua Cuill, ollamh of Mumu, dies.”

| Preceded by Mac Beathaidh mac Ainmire | Chief Ollam of Ireland; 1041–1048 | Succeeded by Flaithem Mac Mael Gaimrid |
