= Æthelstan of Abingdon =

Abbot of Abingdon

Æthelstan was Abbot of Abingdon in the 11th century.

Æthelstan became Abbot of Abingdon about 1044, following Siward's promotion. He was remembered as a supporter of alms and compassion. The Anglo-Saxon Chronicle records in 1047 a time of pestilence. Æthelstan stepped in to give nourishment to those suffering from starvation in his own community and beyond. He died on 29 March 1047 or 1048. He was succeeded by Spearhafoc.

== Bibliography ==
- Kelly, S. E. 2000. Charters of Abingdon, part 1. Anglo-Saxon Charters 7.
