= House of Aumale =

Medieval noble dynasty of Normandy and England

House of Aumale Maison d’Aumale
- Noble house
- Attributed arms of the Counts of Aumale: Or, a lion rampant azure.
- Country: France, later also England
- Founded: c. 1069
- Founder: Guérin of Aumale
- Titles: Count of Aumale
- Cadet branches: House of Ponthieu

The House of Aumale was a medieval noble dynasty based in the County of Aumale in eastern Normandy, later extending its influence into England. It originated around 1069 when William the Conqueror granted the county to his half-sister, Adelaide of Normandy, and her husband. Their son, Guérin, Count of Aumale, became the founder of the dynasty. Through strategic marriages and inheritance, the house became closely linked to the House of Ponthieu and played a role in Anglo-Norman politics.

== History ==
=== Origins ===
The County of Aumale was established by William I of England for his half-sister Adelaide. After her marriage to Enguerrand II of Ponthieuand then to Lambert II of Lens and finally to Odo II of Champagne, the county passed to her son Guérin, who held the title of Count of Aumale.

=== Succession and heiresses ===
Following the early extinction of the male line, the county passed through several female heirs. One of the most prominent was Hawise, Countess of Aumale (c. 1160–1214), daughter of William le Gros. She inherited the county and held it in her own right. She was married to William de Mandeville, 3rd Earl of Essex, and later to William de Forz.

Their descendants, known as the de Forz family, held the English earldom of Aumale (also known as Albemarle). Although the French county was seized by Philip II of France in 1196, the English title continued.

The last de Forz heir, Aveline de Forz, died in 1274 without issue. Her estates reverted to the English Crown in 1278 under Edward I of England.

=== Dynastic connections ===
Through Hawise and the de Forz line, the House of Aumale was linked with: - The de Forz family, who held the English Earldom of Albemarle. - The House of Ponthieu, through earlier marriage alliances. - The English royal family, via inheritance claims and marital ties.

== Legacy ==
Though the original male line ended in the 12th century, the title of Count or Earl of Aumale retained symbolic and political value. The house’s members held land in both Normandy and England and played roles in feudal conflict, royal succession, and the Anglo-French rivalry of the 12th and 13th centuries.

== Notable members ==
- Guérin of Aumale
- Adelaide of Normandy
- William le Gros, Count of Aumale
- Hawise, Countess of Aumale
- William de Forz, 3rd Earl of Albemarle

== See also ==
- County of Aumale
- House of Ponthieu
- House of Normandy
- Hawise, Countess of Aumale

== Sources ==
- Douglas, David C. (1964). William the Conqueror. University of California Press.
- Thompson, Kathleen (2002). Power and Border Lordship in Medieval France: The County of the Perche, 1000–1226. Boydell & Brewer.
