= De Forz family =

Medieval Anglo-Norman noble family, Earls of Albemarle

de Forz
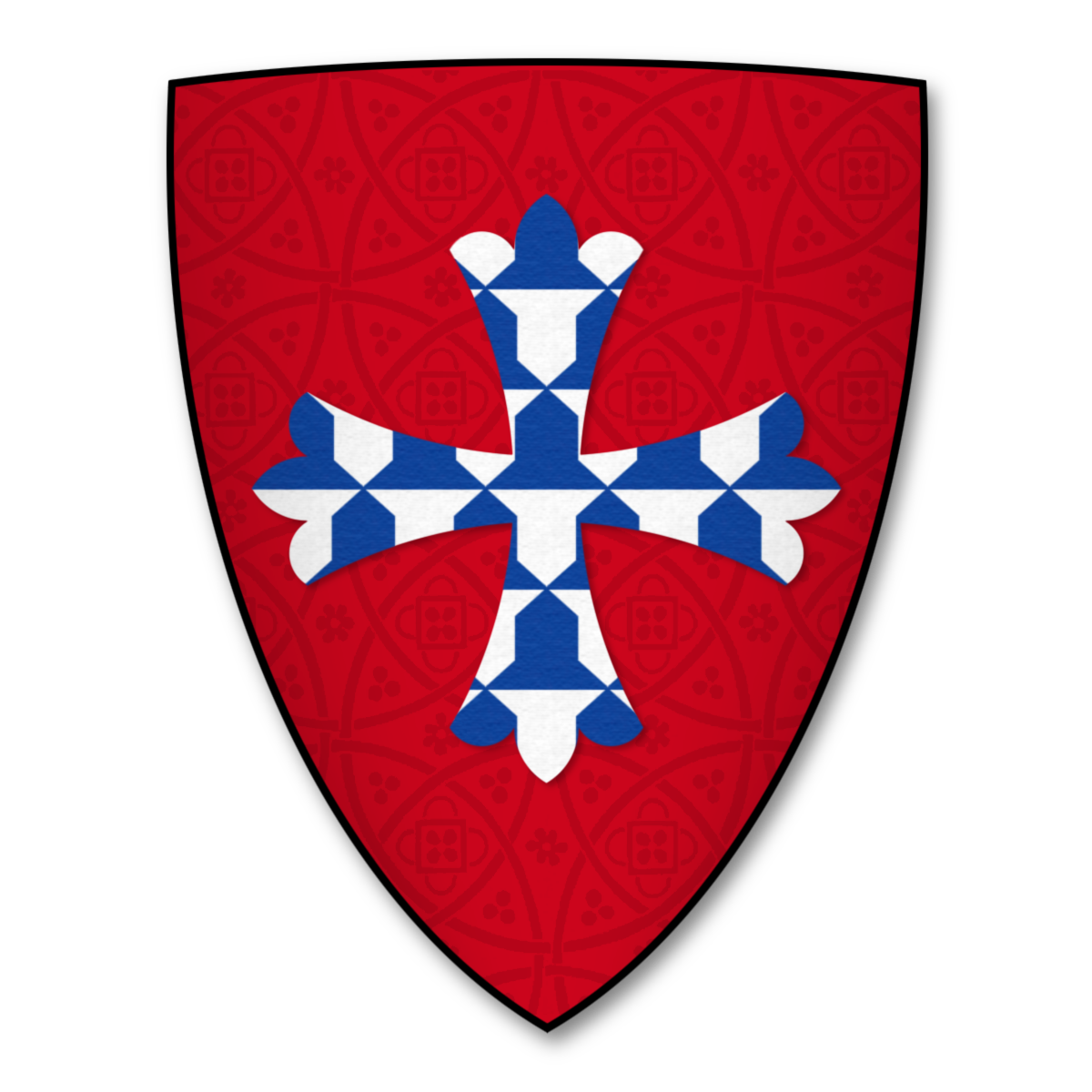
- Arms of the de Forz family: Gules, a cross patonce vair
- Country: Kingdom of England
- Founder: William de Forz (d. 1195)
- Final ruler: Aveline de Forz
- Titles: Earl of Albemarle

The de Forz family (Latin: de Fortibus) was an Anglo-Norman dynasty who held the Earldom of Albemarle (Aumale) in northern England during the 13th century. Their lineage began with the marriage of Hawise, Countess of Aumale, and William de Forz, and ended with the death of Aveline de Forz.

== History ==
=== William de Forz ===
William de Forz was a Poitevin naval commander who accompanied Richard I on his crusades. William also accompanied Fleming Baldwin de Béthune. He has been incorrectly called Earl of Albemarle, as he took his title from the town of Aumale like his mother. He died in 1195.

=== William de Forz, 3rd Earl of Albemarle (1191×6-1241) ===
William inherited his title after his mother's death in 1214. In 1215, he became a part of committee of the Magna Carta. After his wife, Aveline de Montfichet, died in 1239, William went to Jerusalem and eventually died of starvation.

=== William de Forz, 4th Earl of Albemarle (d. 1260) ===
His son succeeded as the 4th Earl in 1242. His first marriage to Christina of Galloway ended with her death. In 1248, he married Isabella de Redvers, heiress of Devon and the Isle of Wight. He died in Amiens in 1260.

=== Aveline de Forz (1259–1274) ===
Aveline, was the presumed heiress of the Earldom of Devon and Lordship of the Isle of Wight. She married Edmund Crouchback, Earl of Lancaster and son of King Henry III. She died without a child in 1274.
