= Stephen of Aumale =

Count of Aumale (c. 1070–1127)

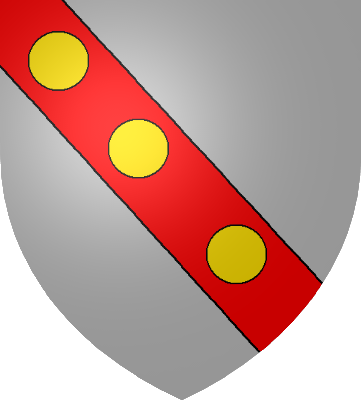
Arms of the counts of Aumale

Stephen (Étienne) of Aumale (c. 1070–1127) was count of Aumale from before 1089 to 1127, and lord of Holderness.

Stephen was the only son of Count Odo of Champagne and Adelaide of Normandy, countess of Aumale, daughter of Duke Robert I of Normandy. Via his mother, Stephen was therefore the nephew of William the Conqueror and first cousin to Robert Curthose and Kings William II and Henry I of England. Stephen succeeded his mother as count before 1089.

In the 1095 conspiracy against William II, the objective of the rebels was to place Stephen on the English throne. The leaders of the conspiracy were Robert de Mowbray and Count William II of Eu. After the failure of the rebellion, Stephen was apparently not put on trial himself, perhaps because he was out of the king's reach in Normandy. Stephen's father Odo Count of Champagne lost his English lands for his complicity in this attempt to place his son on the throne.

In 1096 Stephen joined the First Crusade as part of the army of his cousin Robert Curthose, duke of Normandy. Following the death of William II, in 1102 Stephen was given back his father's confiscated lands in England and became lord of Holderness in Yorkshire. He sided with Henry in his war against Robert in 1104, but in 1118, when Robert's son William Clito rebelled against Henry, Stephen supported William, together with Count Baldwin VII of Flanders. He finally submitted to Henry I in 1119.

Stephen married Hawise, daughter of Ranulph de Mortimer, lord of Wigmore and St. Victor-en-Caux, and Mélisende. Their children were :

- William (c. 1101 – 1179), Count of Aumale; married Cecily of Skipton, (Note: Cicily was a granddaughter of King Duncan II of Scotland. See: Scots Peerage, I, p. 2.) daughter of William fitz Duncan, and had a daughter:
  - Hawise, Countess of Aumale, married: (1) William de Mandeville, 3rd Earl of Essex; (2) William de Forz; (3) Baldwin de Béthune. By her second husband she had surviving issue:
    - William de Forz, 3rd Earl of Albemarle (c.1190 - 1242)
- Stephen (born c. 1112) fl. 1150; married Margaret Mortimer, daughter of Roger Mortimer and had issue:
  - William "Crassus" or "le Cras", became the progenitor of the Grace family in Ireland.
- Enguerrand or Ingelran de Aumale, fl. 1150
- Agnes (c. 1117 – after 1170), married William de Roumare († 1151), son of William de Roumare, Earl of Lincoln. As his widow she secondly married Adam I de Brus, Lord of Skelton.

== Notes ==
French nobility
Preceded by Adelaide	Count of Aumale; 1090–1127	Succeeded by William
