= Guérin of Aumale =

11th-century Norman nobleman and founder of the House of Aumale

- Count of Aumale
- Reign: c. 1087–c. 1100
- Born: c. 1040
- Died: c. 1100
- Father: Enguerrand II, Count of Ponthieu
- Mother: Adelaide of Normandy

Guérin (Latin: Guérinus; c. 1040 – c. 1100) was a Norman nobleman who became the first Count of Aumale, founding the medieval House of Aumale. He inherited the county through his mother, Adelaide of Normandy, half-sister of William the Conqueror, and played a documented role in late 11th-century Anglo-Norman aristocratic networks.

== Early life and family ==
Guérin was born around 1040 to Adelaide of Normandy and Enguerrand II, Count of Ponthieu. Through Adelaide, he was closely related to the ruling Norman dynasty and appears in records as a minor beneficiary of ducal patronage.

== Establishment as Count of Aumale ==
Around 1069, Adelaide was granted the lordship of Aumale by King William I as part of her dower. After her death, Guérin inherited the title and was recognized by about 1087 as the first Count of Aumale in his own right, effectively separating it from the County of Ponthieu.

== Status and political activity ==
Although not a dominant political figure, Guérin appears in surviving charters involving the Aumale estates in both Normandy and England. These suggest he held land under dual vassalage and was part of the feudal web that linked Anglo-Norman aristocracy across the Channel.

== Legacy ==
Guérin founded the House of Aumale, which remained politically active through the 12th and 13th centuries. His descendants included Hawise, Countess of Aumale and the de Forz family, who held the English title of Earl of Albemarle. The county of Aumale remained important in Anglo-French territorial politics until its absorption by the French Crown.
