= William de Fors =

William de Fors or Forz may refer to:

- William de Forz (died 1195)
- William de Forz, 3rd Earl of Albemarle
- William de Forz, 4th Earl of Albemarle
