= Holderness =

Region of Yorkshire, England

Coordinates: 53.84°N 0.18°W

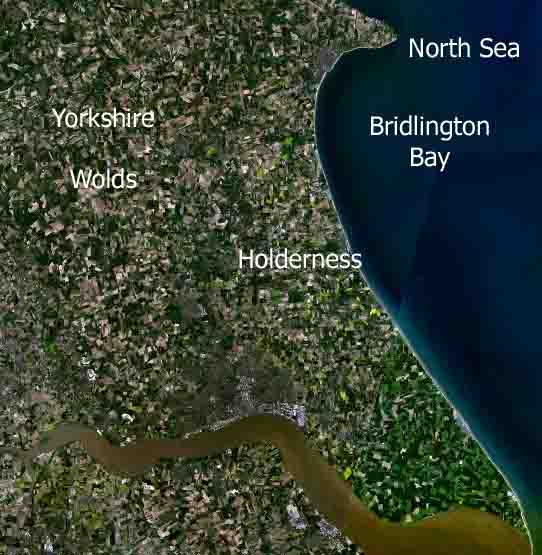
Holderness from space.

Holderness is an area of the East Riding of Yorkshire, on the north-east coast of England. An area of rich agricultural land, Holderness was marshland until it was drained in the Middle Ages. Topographically, Holderness has more in common with the Netherlands than with other parts of Yorkshire. To the north and west are the Yorkshire Wolds. Holderness generally refers to the area between the River Hull and the North Sea. The Prime Meridian passes through Holderness just to the east of Patrington and through Tunstall to the north.

Between 1974 and 1996, Holderness lay within the Borough of Holderness in Humberside. It gave its name to a wapentake until the 19th century, when its functions were replaced by other local government bodies, particularly after the Local Government Act 1888. The city of Kingston upon Hull lies in the south-west corner of Holderness and Bridlington borders the north-east but both are usually considered separately. The main towns include Withernsea, Hornsea and Hedon. The Holderness coast stretches from Flamborough Head to Spurn Head. The ancient market town of Beverley lies just to the west of the Holderness area, on the eastern slopes of the Yorkshire Wolds.

Because of its soft soil, the coastline is vulnerable to erosion, on average losing six feet (1.8 m) a year. The coast and surrounding communities have had to implement managed retreat.

== Location and transport ==
The area has boundaries which are clearly defined by the rising land of the Yorkshire Wolds to the north and west, the North Sea to the east and the Humber Estuary to the south.

There are no motorways in the area; however, there is access to the national motorway network via the A63 from Hull. Links to the continent are also via Hull, from where a daily ferry service to Rotterdam departs. A-class roads centre upon Hull and the coastal resort of Bridlington. Otherwise the A1033 road which connects Withernsea on the south-east coast to inland areas is the only main route in the area.

The only remaining rail link is the Yorkshire Coast Line that runs between Hull in the south and Bridlington and it tends to skirt the area towards the west. Until the 1960s there were lines from Hull to both Hornsea and Withernsea, but these were closed by the Beeching cuts. Furthermore, in 1901 there was a proposal to construct the North Holderness Light Railway from Beverley to North Frodingham railway station, but this came to nothing.

== Physical geography ==
=== Climate ===
As part of the United Kingdom, the Holderness area generally has cool summers and relatively mild winters. The latitude of the area means that it is influenced by predominantly westerly winds with depressions and their associated fronts, bringing with them unsettled and windy weather, particularly in winter. The wind sometimes causes depositions to happen. Between depressions there are often small mobile anticyclones that bring periods of fair weather. In winter anticyclones bring cold dry weather. In summer the anticyclones tend to bring dry settled conditions which can lead to drought. For its latitude this area is mild in winter and cooler in summer due to the influence of the Gulf Stream in the northern Atlantic Ocean. Air temperature varies on a daily and seasonal basis. The temperature is usually lower at night and January is the coldest time of the year. The two dominant influences on the climate of the Holderness are the shelter against the worst of the moist westerly winds provided firstly by the Pennines and then the Yorkshire Wolds and the proximity of the North Sea. Generally, rainfall is 600 to 700 mm per year which is low compared with the national average rainfall of 1125 mm.

=== Geology and topography ===
Geologically, Holderness is underlain by Cretaceous chalk but in most places it is so deeply buried beneath glacial deposits that it has no influence on the landscape. The landscape is dominated by deposits of till, boulder clays and glacial lake clays. These were deposited during the Devensian glaciation. The glacial deposits form a more or less continuous lowland plain which has some peat filled depressions (known locally as meres) which mark the presence of former lake beds. There are other glacial landscape features such as drumlin mounds, ridges and kettle holes scattered throughout the area.

The well-drained glacial deposits provide fertile soils that can support intensive arable cultivation. Fields are generally large and bounded by drainage ditches. There is very little woodland in the area and this leads to a landscape that is essentially rural but very flat and exposed. The coast is subject to rapid marine erosion.

=== Erosion ===
The Holderness coastline suffers the highest rate of coastal erosion in Europe: 5 feet (1.5 m) a year on average or 2 million tonnes of material a year. Some of this is transported by longshore drift with about three percent of material being deposited at Spurn Point spit, to the south. The growth of Spurn Point is demonstrated by a series of lighthouses that have been built on the point. It is thought that approximately 3 miles (5 km) of land has been lost since the Roman era, including at least 23 towns and villages, including Ravenspurn.

Holderness is a pre-glacial bay that was infilled in during the ice age and now comprises chalk/glacial compounds such as boulder clay. Its coastline is thus susceptible to erosion due to the long north-easterly fetch which generates for powerful on-shore waves.

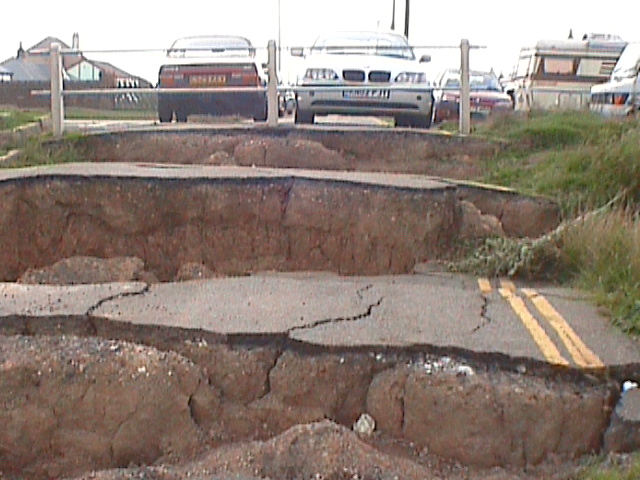
Aldbrough, Holderness. Coastal erosion.

All the villages affected by the erosion are located on the north side of the Humber estuary. The area stretches from the high chalk cliffs of Flamborough Head south to Spurn Point. Villages such as Ravenser, which had sent representatives to the parliament of Edward I, have totally disappeared.

The local authorities are endeavouring to prevent the effects of erosion. Hard defences in the form of a concrete seawall and timber groynes have given some protection. It has been suggested that a large underwater reef made of tyres could be built off the Holderness coast to mitigate this erosion, but it would be costly to build.

Other defences include sea walls, groynes, and gabions but business people say that if the erosion is not stopped then there will be millions of pounds of damage. However, one or more such groynes has had a detrimental effect further along the coast, in some areas resulting in erosion of up to 66 feet (20 m) per year initially, though over the long term erosion rates have been seen to revert to their original yearly average of closer to 6 feet 7 inches (2 m) a year.

=== Drainage ===
The Holderness area is drained by the River Hull and its tributaries and a number of coastal streams. The valley of the River Hull is broad and shallow and in its lower reaches the river is contained within flood banks. The River Hull Tidal Surge Barrier at the mouth of the river can be used to prevent surge tides overwhelming the flood defences. Large areas of Holderness are too flat and low to drain naturally so in these areas a low level drainage system operates to collect the water. In the middle and lower reaches of the River Hull water is pumped from the low level drains into a high level system. This system consists of elevated water courses bounded by embankments. It drains by gravity into the sea. The main drain is the Holderness Drain, begun in 1764 by the engineer John Grundy Jr.

In the east and south-east of Holderness there is a complex network of drains and streams that flow south into the Humber or east into the North Sea. To mitigate the effects of high tides stopping the water flow from these outlets, several have had pumping stations constructed at their outfalls.

== Natural history ==
For the purpose of describing the natural history the area can be divided into three parts:-

- The valley of the River Hull

The River Hull valley dominates the western landscape of Holderness. The river and its associated wetland habitats support a diverse range of plants and animals. The upper tributaries of the river originate on the edge of the Yorkshire Wolds before entering the area of glacial and alluvial deposits of Holderness. The river bed varies in composition reflecting the underlying geology. In the upper reaches of the river water crowfoot, lesser water parsnip, mare's-tail and spiked water-milfoil may be found in the main channel whilst the marginal vegetation is composed of branched bur-reed, common reed and reed sweetgrass.

Otters have recently recolonised the upper reaches of the river, yet the European water vole is now confined to a few isolated populations. Notable species of invertebrates include uncommon mayflies. There is a diverse breeding bird community including lapwing, snipe and common redshank. Wildfowl such as mallard and mute swans may also be seen, along with yellow wagtail, sedge warbler, reed warbler and reed bunting.

Further south towards Hull the river becomes tidal and saline. In the lower reaches it is enclosed by flood banks with little associated natural habitat remaining. The majority of the formerly extensive wetlands have been subject to drainage schemes and agricultural improvement. However some small remnants remain along the Hull valley between Driffield and Wansford. Plants that are typical of these habitats including a variety of reeds, rushes and sedges as well as yellow flag, valerian and meadowsweet may be found.

There are few surviving areas of woodland among the open farmland which supports golden plover and lapwing and a flora of arable weeds.

- The Coast

The coast from Bridlington in the north to Spurn Point is an interesting complex of coastal processes. The soft cliffs of Holderness are subject to rapid erosion whilst the eroded material is being deposited on the Spurn peninsula. The speed of erosion along the glacial till cliffs prohibits colonisation of anything but sparse ruderal vegetation. Coltsfoot is particularly common and sand martin colonies have become established in places.

Hornsea Mere is the largest natural lake in Yorkshire at 120 hectares. It has, besides the open fresh water habitat, marginal habitats of reed swamp, species-rich fen and carr woodland. It regularly supports populations of wintering wildfowl and the reed beds provide breeding sites for reed warblers. Characteristic plants include milk parsley, greater water parsnip and lesser reedmace.

- The Humber Estuary

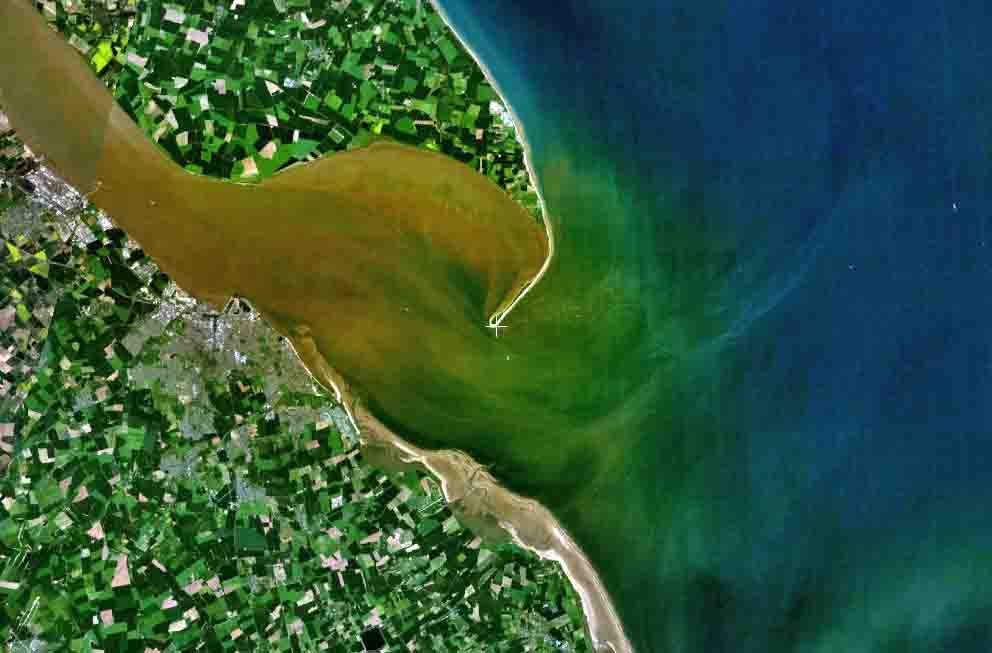
The silt flows at the Humber Estuary

The intertidal system of the Humber estuary has local seagrass beds that provide feeding and wintering areas for over 133,000 waders and wildfowl. It is rich in invertebrate communities. The estuary also provides for breeding birds, grey seals and natterjack toads.

Spurn Point at the tip of the Spurn peninsula is made of hard glacial moraine so is less liable to erosion than areas further north on the Holderness coast. The Spurn peninsula is a beach with dunes which moves in response to the action of the waves. The wave action removes sand from the east of the beach and deposits it on the western side. The coast is influenced mainly by wave action but in the estuary the processes are driven by the power of the tides. The incoming tidal currents carry more sediment into the estuary than the ebb tides carry out.

The estuary is shallow because of this constant deposition. Isostatic recoil is, however, causing the area to sink at the rate of 3 mm annually and global warming is making the sea level rise. The combined effects of these processes mean that the sea in the estuary may be half a metre higher by the year 2050. A large area around the estuary consists of land which lies below the present high-water mark. Flood defences offer only a short-term and local answer and may actually increase the long-term risks. Managed realignment of the coast by setting back the coastal defences will provide new intertidal habitats and harness natural equalising processes and is the preferred long-term solution.

== History ==
=== Prehistory ===
There is archaeological evidence to suggest that the first settlers in Holderness arrived in the Neolithic era when the plain was still very wet and most likely consisted of a mixture of marshes, lakes, islands and woodland. As the sea level changed and the area became drier it was progressively cleared of trees and the higher drier parts were initially favoured for settlement.

=== Anglo-Saxon ===
The Domesday survey reveals that in the reign of Edward the Confessor there were 45 different freeholders having land in Holderness. The name of Holderness may be derived from the Danish "hold" which was the name given in that language to a nobleman with considerable territorial possessions. The "ness" part generally refers to a promontory, or nose-shape, either in a river or jutting from a coastline.

=== Medieval ===
After the Norman Conquest of England the extensive Lordship of Holderness was given by King William I to Drogo de la Beuvrière, a Flemish supporter. This Drogo built a castle at Skipsea before 1087 when his estates were confiscated by the king.

The area was then given to Adelaide of Normandy, and the title to her husband, Odo, but this was taken from him when he rebelled against the King William II in 1095. It was returned to her son Stephen of Aumale in 1102. The Honour or Lordship of Holderness then descended to successive Earls (or Counts) of Aumale:

- William le Gros 1127–1179
- Hawise of Aumale 1179–1194 with her husbands as Counts jure uxoris:
  - William de Mandeville, 3rd Earl of Essex 1180–1189
  - William de Forz 1189–1194
  - Baldwin of Bethune 1195–1212
- William de Forz, 3rd Earl of Albemarle (died 1242), son of the 2nd Countess by her second husband William de Forz
- William de Forz, 4th Earl of Albemarle (died 1260), son of the 3rd Earl

William de Forz, 4th Earl, was survived by his widow Isabella de Forz. She was given custody of her children Thomas and William, but outlived them and also her daughter Aveline, who married Edmund Crouchback, 1st Earl of Lancaster (son of Henry III), but died aged 15. The Honour of Holderness then escheated to the crown.

The coastal trading town of Ravenser Odd, represented in the 13th century model parliament, was lost to the sea through storm and coastal erosion. Its seaport role was eventually taken over by the new town of Kingston upon Hull but until about 1400 by Hedon and Beverley as Hull was isolated by the surrounding marshes.

Robin of Redesdale was responsible for raising the northern shires against King Edward IV in the spring of 1469. The uprising led by Robin of Redesdale provided the opportunity for Robin of Holderness to lead a separate rebellion relating to a corn tax. Both men submitted to Edward IV <genealogy.com user 1998> in March 1470 following the failure of Warwick's rebellion.

Large estates in Holderness were held by the Bishop of Durham and the Archbishop of York. Other large landowners in the area included the abbeys of Meaux and Thornton and the priories of Swine, Nunkeeling and Bridlington. This land was confiscated and became crown property when Henry VIII ordered the Dissolution of the Monasteries in the 16th century.

=== Tudor and Stuart ===
The Aumale lordship had also passed to the crown and was obtained along with some former monastic lands by the Constable family of Burton Constable in the 16th century. Other large estates created from former monastic holdings were sold by the crown to private landowners in the 17th and 18th centuries. Piecemeal attempts were made to improve the poor drainage of the area and with the formation of drainage boards in the later 18th century flooding began to be controlled. The remaining wastes were added to farm land and the meres, fluctuating lakes, disappeared.

=== 19th and 20th centuries ===
The opening of railways from Hull accelerated the growth of first Withernsea in 1854 and Hornsea in 1864 as coastal resorts and commuter towns of Hull. Many of the other settlements grew and changed their character from agricultural villages to become dormitory settlements of Hull, Beverley, Bridlington and Driffield. Sales of large landed estates have reduced many of the large agricultural holdings that were in private ownership but some still remain and some have been used to create large farming agri-businesses which manage considerable areas with few farms. The rail links to both Withernsea and Hornsea closed to passengers in 1964 and closed completely in 1965.

== Demography ==
Administratively and politically the Holderness area now lies within a number of different divisions. The Beverley and Holderness parliamentary constituency statistics have been used to provide a representative picture of the area.

In 2004 there were 95,077 people living in the area in 41,224 households. Of these people 4.7% were aged below 25 years, 52.6% were aged between 25 and 55 years and 42.8% were 55 years old or more. The population density was in 2001 was 1.25 persons per hectare and 78% of households were privately owned compared with a national average of 68%.

There was a relatively low unemployment rate of 1.7% compared with a national average of 2.3%.

== Economy ==
In Holderness the average household income in 2004 was £27,958 compared with a national average of £30,081. The area provides adequate shopping and market facilities for its residents and visitors. The three small towns of Hedon, Hornsea and Withernsea offer a range of facilities and the bigger local centres of Bridlington and Beverley are regularly used by Holderness people. Hull is the largest commercial centre which is regularly used and it provides employment for a significant proportion of the population.

Agriculture is the traditional employment of the area and there is a substantial area of horticultural development on the flat fertile land in the south-west. Animal husbandry, particularly pig rearing, is a major part of the agricultural scene. In 2001 agriculture employed 4.5% of the working population.

Industrial activity ranges from small workshop units in Hornsea and Withernsea to the Easington and Dimlington gas terminals on the east coast. These terminals process gas from the North Sea gas fields. The British Petroleum chemical works at Saltend uses condensates from the gas refining process and is a major employer in the area.

Tourism makes a significant contribution to the economy of Hornsea and Withernsea with Hornsea Pottery and Freeport attracting around a million visitors each year.

== Fiction ==
"The Adventure of the Priory School", a Sherlock Holmes mystery by Sir Arthur Conan Doyle, takes place mostly in Holderness. Also one of the main characters is the Duke of Holderness, who resides in the area at the fictional Holderness Hall. Other works of fiction based in, or around, Holderness include The Summoner's Tale by Geoffrey Chaucer and South Riding by Winifred Holtby. In "Spurn Head," part three of Will Self's Walking to Hollywood, the rapid erosion of the Holderness Coast is used as a metaphor for the effects of Alzheimer's disease.
