= 1100 =

1100 in various calendars
- Gregorian calendar: 1100; MC
- Ab urbe condita: 1853
- Armenian calendar: 549; ԹՎ ՇԽԹ
- Assyrian calendar: 5850
- Balinese saka calendar: 1021–1022
- Bengali calendar: 506–507
- Berber calendar: 2050
- English Regnal year: 13 Will. 2 – 1 Hen. 1
- Buddhist calendar: 1644
- Burmese calendar: 462
- Byzantine calendar: 6608–6609
- Chinese calendar: 己卯年 (Earth Rabbit); 3797 or 3590 — to — 庚辰年 (Metal Dragon); 3798 or 3591
- Coptic calendar: 816–817
- Discordian calendar: 2266
- Ethiopian calendar: 1092–1093
- Hebrew calendar: 4860–4861
- Hindu calendars
- Vikram Samvat: 1156–1157
- Shaka Samvat: 1021–1022
- Kali Yuga: 4200–4201
- Holocene calendar: 11100
- Igbo calendar: 100–101
- Iranian calendar: 478–479
- Islamic calendar: 493–494
- Japanese calendar: Kōwa 2 (康和２年)
- Javanese calendar: 1005–1006
- Julian calendar: 1100; MC
- Korean calendar: 3433
- Minguo calendar: 812 before ROC 民前812年
- Nanakshahi calendar: −368
- Seleucid era: 1411/1412 AG
- Thai solar calendar: 1642–1643
- Tibetan calendar: ས་མོ་ཡོས་ལོ་ (female Earth-Hare); 1226 or 845 or 73 — to — ལྕགས་ཕོ་འབྲུག་ལོ་ (male Iron-Dragon); 1227 or 846 or 74

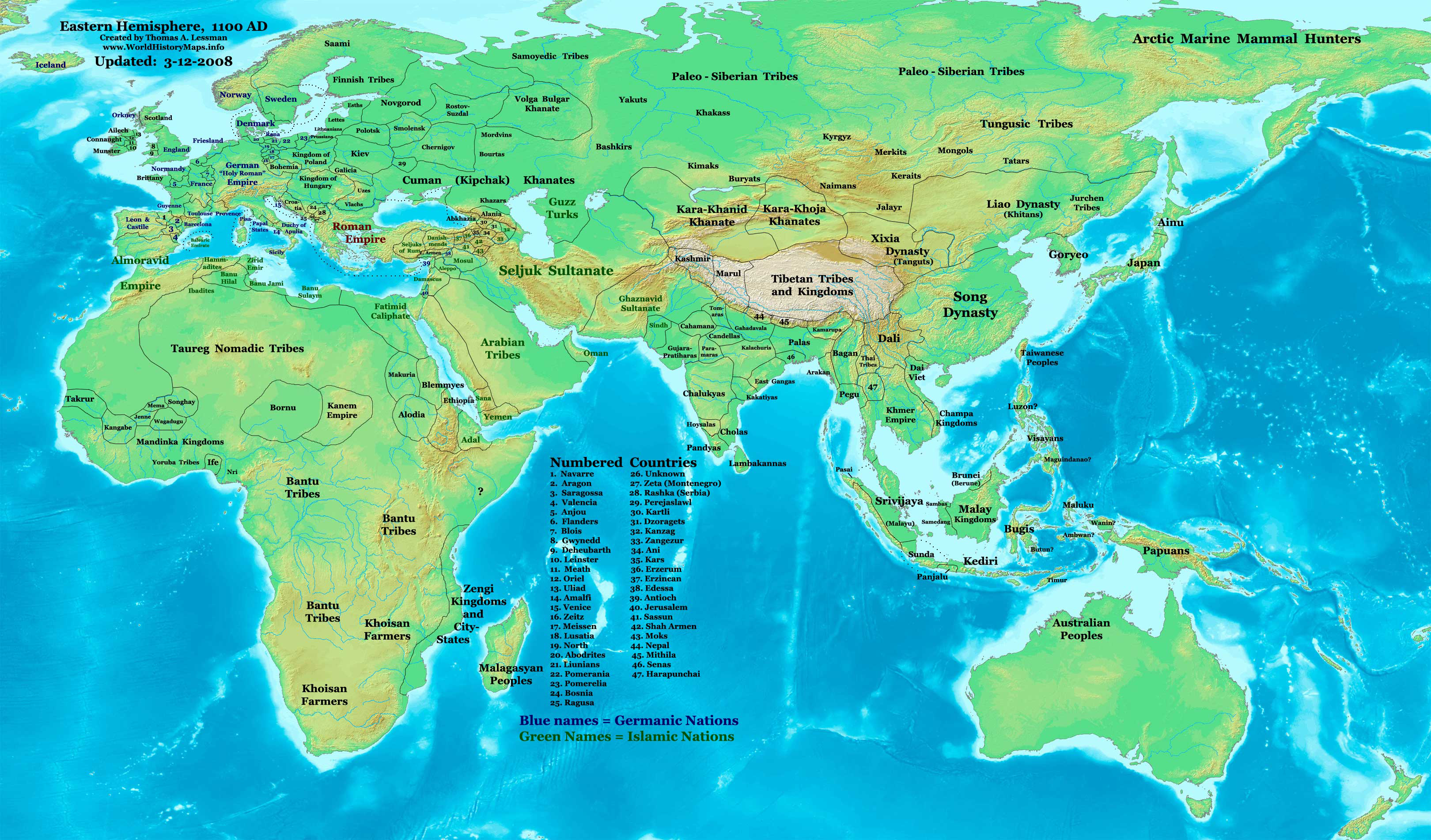
The Eastern Hemisphere in 1100

Year 1100 (MC) was a leap year starting on Sunday in the Julian calendar. It was the last year of the 11th century and the first year of the 12th century. In the proleptic Gregorian calendar, it was a non-leap century year starting on Monday (like 1900).

== Events ==
=== By place ===
==== Levant ====
- January – The Seljuk ruler Muhammad Tapar is expelled from Baghdad by his brother Barkiyaruq, but Muhammad manages to retake the city during his spring offensive.
- May or June – Count Raymond IV of Toulouse (Saint-Gilles) sails to Constantinople to obtain the support of Byzantine Emperor Alexios I Komnenos in his attempt to seize Tripoli.
- August 1 – A Genoese fleet leaves Italy to support the Crusaders' efforts to conquer the coastal cities; the ships reach Latakia on September 25.
- August – Battle of Melitene: Bohemond I of Antioch is captured by the Danishmends, leaving Tancred as regent of the Principality of Antioch for two years.
- August 20 – With the support of a Venetian fleet, the Crusaders under Tancred capture the coastal city of Haifa.
- December 25 – French Crusader Baldwin I is crowned first King of Jerusalem at the Church of the Nativity in Bethlehem, by Daimbert, the new Latin Patriarch of Jerusalem, following the death of the previous ruler, Baldwin's brother Godfrey of Bouillon, on July 18.
- After a success over the Armenians of Cilicia and the Emirate of Aleppo, Baldwin of Bourcq becomes Count of Edessa, with the support of Daimbert.
- Genoa, Venice and Pisa gain trading privileges from the Crusader states, in return for their service during the conquest of the coastal cities.

==== Europe ====
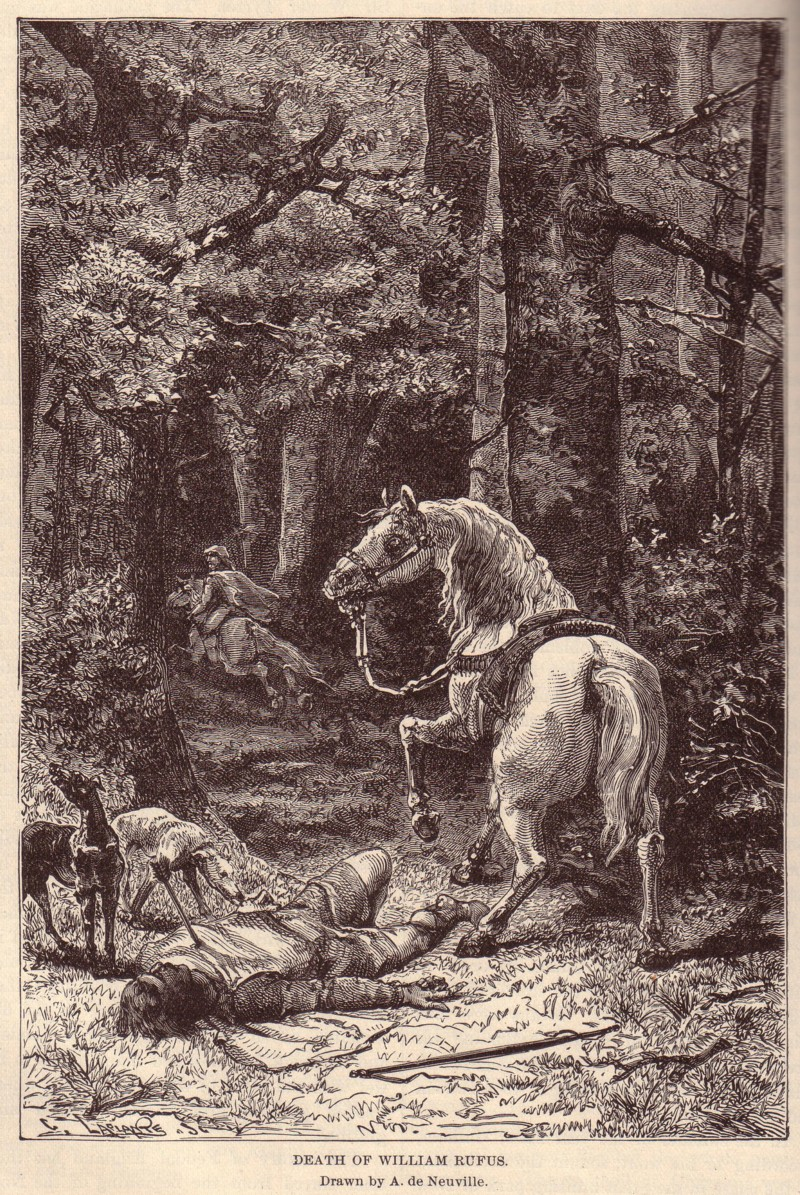
2 August: Death of William II of England during a hunt, killed by an arrow of Walter Tirel.

- August 2 – King William II of England (William Rufus) dies in a hunting accident in the New Forest. Sir Walter Tirel is accused of having shot the arrow, but flees the country to avoid a trial. Henry I claims the throne.
- August 5 – Henry I is crowned King of England, at Westminster Abbey. The power of the new monarch is ill-assured, and to mollify the barons he has to grant them the Charter of Liberties, one of the first examples of a written constitution in Europe.
- August 30 – After the failure of the Council of Liubech in 1097, the Congress of Vytechev establishes peace and the feudal system in Kievan Rus; the princes come to an agreement to share the country between them. Sviatopolk II of Kiev becomes the first Grand Prince.
- September 16 – Battle of Malagon: The Almoravid army defeats Castellan troops.
- September 23 – Anselm, archbishop of Canterbury returns to England from exile, at the invitation of Henry I.
- October 18 – Reconquista: Peter I of Aragon conquers Barbastro (modern Spain) from the hands of the Almoravids.
- November 11 – King Henry I of England marries Matilda of Scotland, the daughter of King Malcolm III and a direct descendant of the Saxon king Edmund Ironside.
- November 18 – The Council of Poitiers opens, but is soon forcibly closed by William IX, Duke of Aquitaine, as the bishops are about to excommunicate King Philip I of France once more.
- December 25 – Philip I of France elevates his son Louis VI as co-ruler to the government of the realm.
- Philip I of France conquers the Vexin area, and adds the city of Bourges and the province of Berry to his estate.
- In Iceland, the Althing decides that the laws should be transferred to a written form (approximate date).
- Intense urban activity in north and central Europe: Kalmar (Kungälv) and Varberg (Sweden) are chartered; The cities of Aach (southern Germany) and Nakléřov in Bohemia are created. The castle of Burg Eppstein is built in central Germany.
- Henry I of England grants the ownership of Carisbrooke Castle on the Isle of Wight to Richard de Redvers, a Norman nobleman.

==== Africa ====
- A collective of Tuareg trading clans decide to permanently settle the city of Timbuktu (modern Mali) north of Djenné along the Niger River. Timbuktu will later achieve fame as a center of Islamic learning. The Sankore, Djinguereber and Sidi Yahya mosques are among Timbuktu's most famous religious and scholarly institutions (approximate date).

==== China ====
- February 23 – Emperor Zhezong dies after a 15-year reign. He is succeeded by his 17-year-old brother Huizong as ruler of the Song dynasty. At about this date, the Chinese population reaches around 100 million and in Kaifeng, his capital, the number of registered citizens within the walls is about 1,050,000 with the army stationed here boosting the overall populace to some 1.4 million people.
- The Liao dynasty crushes the Zubu, a tribute state of the Khitan Empire, and takes their khan prisoner.

==== Americas ====
- Oraibi, a Hopi village in Navajo County, becomes the oldest populated settlement in modern-day Arizona (modern-day United States).
- The Ancestral Puebloans culture, located in the modern-day Four Corners (United States), rises (approximate date).
- The city of Cusco (modern Peru) is founded (approximate date).

=== By topic ===
==== Religion ====
- September 8 – Antipope Clement III dies at Civita Castellana after a 20-year reign in opposition to the legitimate popes Gregory VII, Victor III and Urban II. Supporters of Emperor Henry IV in Rome choose Theodoric as his successor.
- November – The council of Poitiers decrees that the followers of Robert of Arbrissel have to settle down and live under a rule, leading to the foundation of Fontevraud Abbey.
- Frederick I becomes archbishop of Cologne, and begins the construction of the castle of Volmarstein.
- The Stift St. Georgen Abbey is founded near Sankt Georgen am Längsee (modern Austria).
- The Diocese of Faroe is founded (approximate date).

==== Sports and games ====
- Checkers is invented (approximate date).

== Births ==
- May 19 – Judith of Bavaria, duchess of Swabia (d. 1130)
- May 23 – Qin Zong, Chinese emperor (d. 1161)
- Achard of Saint Victor, Norman bishop (d. 1171)
- Adrian IV, pope of the Catholic Church (d. 1159)
- Albert I (the Bear), margrave of Brandenburg (d. 1170)
- Alexander III, pope of the Catholic Church (d. 1181)
- Anselm of Havelberg, German bishop (approximate date)
- Arnold I, archbishop of Cologne (approximate date)
- Bruno II of Berg, archbishop of Cologne (d. 1137)
- Eliza and Mary Chulkhurst, English conjoined twins (d. 1134)
- Elvira of Castile, queen consort of Sicily (approximate date)
- Gilbert de Clare, 1st Earl of Pembroke (d. 1148)
- Héloïse d'Argenteuil, French abbess and scholar (d. 1162)
- Herman of Carinthia, German astronomer (d. 1160)
- Hillin of Falmagne, archbishop of Trier (d. 1169)
- Jabir ibn Aflah, Arab astronomer and mathematician (d. 1150)
- John of Meda, Italian monk and abbot (d. 1159)
- Muhammad al-Idrisi, Almoravid geographer (d. 1165)
- Owain Gwynedd, Welsh king of Gwynedd (approximate date)
- Jacob ben Meir Tam, French Jewish rabbi (d. 1171)
- Robert de Beaumont, 2nd Earl Leicester (d. 1168)
- Robert de Ferrers, 2nd Earl of Derby (d. 1162)
- Robert of Melun, bishop of Hereford (d. 1167)
- Robert of Newminster, English abbot (d. 1159)
- Teobaldo Roggeri, Italian shoemaker (d. 1150)

== Deaths ==
- February 23 – Zhezong, Chinese emperor (b. 1077)
- February 25 – Gerland, bishop of Agrigento
- March 28 – Adelaide of Weimar-Orlamünde, German noblewoman
- July 18 – Godfrey of Bouillon, French nobleman (b. 1060)
- July 23 – Warner of Grez, French nobleman
- August 2 – William II (or William Rufus), king of England
- September 8 – Clement III, antipope of Rome
- September 16 – Bernold of Constance, German chronicler
- October 13 – Guy I, Count of Ponthieu (or Wido), French nobleman
- November 18 – Thomas of Bayeux, archbishop of York
- December 22 – Bretislav II, duke of Bohemia
- Abu al-Yusr al-Bazdawi, Hanafi-Maturidi scholar (b. 1030)
- Azzo of Gobatsburg, Swedish nobleman (approximate date)
- Geoffrey de Mandeville, Norman Constable of the Tower of London
- Guérin of Aumale, Founder of House of Aumale (b. 1040)
- Geoffrey, Count of Conversano ("the elder"), Italo-Norman nobleman
- Jaya Pala, Indian ruler of the Kamarupa Kingdom (b. 1075)
- Qin Guan, Chinese poet and writer (approximate date)
- Qutb al-din Hasan, ruler (malik) of the Ghurid dynasty
- Robert de Stafford, Anglo-Norman nobleman (approximate date)
