= 1040 =

1040 in various calendars
- Gregorian calendar: 1040; MXL
- Ab urbe condita: 1793
- Armenian calendar: 489; ԹՎ ՆՁԹ
- Assyrian calendar: 5790
- Balinese saka calendar: 961–962
- Bengali calendar: 446–447
- Berber calendar: 1990
- English Regnal year: N/A
- Buddhist calendar: 1584
- Burmese calendar: 402
- Byzantine calendar: 6548–6549
- Chinese calendar: 己卯年 (Earth Rabbit); 3737 or 3530 — to — 庚辰年 (Metal Dragon); 3738 or 3531
- Coptic calendar: 756–757
- Discordian calendar: 2206
- Ethiopian calendar: 1032–1033
- Hebrew calendar: 4800–4801
- Hindu calendars
- Vikram Samvat: 1096–1097
- Shaka Samvat: 961–962
- Kali Yuga: 4140–4141
- Holocene calendar: 11040
- Igbo calendar: 40–41
- Iranian calendar: 418–419
- Islamic calendar: 431–432
- Japanese calendar: Chōryaku 4 / Chōkyū 1 (長久元年)
- Javanese calendar: 943–944
- Julian calendar: 1040; MXL
- Korean calendar: 3373
- Minguo calendar: 872 before ROC 民前872年
- Nanakshahi calendar: −428
- Seleucid era: 1351/1352 AG
- Thai solar calendar: 1582–1583
- Tibetan calendar: ས་མོ་ཡོས་ལོ་ (female Earth-Hare); 1166 or 785 or 13 — to — ལྕགས་ཕོ་འབྲུག་ལོ་ (male Iron-Dragon); 1167 or 786 or 14

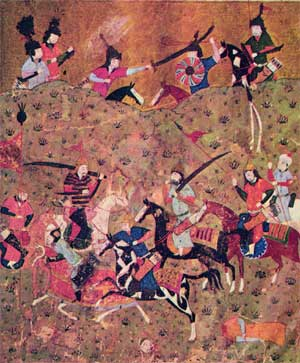
Artwork of the Battle of Dandanaqan

Year 1040 (MXL) was a leap year starting on Tuesday of the Julian calendar.

== Events ==
=== By place ===
==== Europe ====
- Spring – Nikephoros Dokeianos, Byzantine governor of the Catepanate of Italy, is murdered by Lombard rebels at Ascoli. He is replaced by Michael Dokeianos, who arrives in November with a Varangian army.
- August 22–23 – Battle at Brůdek: Duke Bretislav I of Bohemia defeats the German forces under King Henry III ("the Black") in the Bohemian Forest.
- Peter Delyan leads a rebellion against the Byzantine Empire and is proclaimed by the Bulgarian nobles as emperor (tsar) Peter II in Belgrade.
- The Emirate of Sicily is divided and fragmented into small fiefdoms. The Arab nobles of Palermo restore the regime of the Kalbids (approximate date).

==== Britain ====
- March 17 – King Harold Harefoot dies at Oxford at the age of 24. His illegitimate son Ælfwine Haroldsson is left in the care of his grandmother, Ælfgifu of Northampton.
- June 17 – Harthacnut lands at Sandwich and reclaims the throne of England which had been taken by Harald Harefoot in 1035.
- August 14 – King Duncan is killed in battle against his first cousin and rival Macbeth, who succeeds him as king of Scotland.

==== Islamic world ====
- May 23 – Battle of Dandanaqan: The Turkmen Seljuqs defeat the Ghaznavid forces (50,000 men) led by Sultan Masʽud I at Dandanaqan, a fortress city in the desert near Merv. Ghaznavid commanders Ali Daya and Begtoghdi are blamed for the defeat and executed.

=== By topic ===
==== Religion ====
- Weihenstephan Abbey (Kloster Weihenstephan) in Germany, founds the oldest operating brewery.
- The Shalu Monastery is founded by the Buddhist monk Chetsun Sherab Jungnay in Tibet.

==== Industry ====
- The Pontificia Fonderia Marinelli bellfoundry is established at Agnone in southern Italy.

== Births ==
- February 22 – Rashi, French rabbi and writer (d. 1105)
- July 12 – Yun Kwan, Korean general (d. 1111)
- Adelaide of Hungary, duchess of Bohemia (d. 1062)
- Alan Rufus, Norman nobleman (approximate date)
- Alfonso VI, king of León and Castile (approximate date)
- Al-Mu'tamid ibn Abbad, Abbadid emir of Seville (d. 1095) (approximate date)
- Arnold of Soissons, French bishop (approximate date)
- Blessed Gerard, founder of the Knights Hospitaller (d. 1120) (approximate date)
- Bonfilius, bishop of Foligno (approximate date)
- Conrad I, count of Luxembourg (approximate date)
- Ernulf, French Benedictine monk and bishop (d. 1124)
- Gebhard III, bishop of Constance (approximate date)
- Geoffrey III of Anjou, French nobleman (approximate date)
- Géza I (Magnus), king of Hungary (approximate date)
- Guérin of Aumale, Founder of House of Aumale (d. 1100)
- Guglielmo Embriaco, Genoese merchant (d. 1102) (approximate date)
- Haziga of Diessen, German countess (approximate date)
- Harald III, king of Denmark (approximate date)
- Herman I, margrave of Baden (approximate date)
- Hugh I, French nobleman (approximate date)
- Hugh of Die, French bishop (approximate date)
- Ibn Aqil, Persian theologian and jurist (d. 1119) (approximate date)
- Ida of Lorraine, French countess (approximate date)
- Ivo of Chartres, French bishop (approximate date)
- Ladislaus I, king of Hungary (approximate date)
- Oddone Frangipane, Italian monk and hermit (d. 1127)
- Odo I of Furneaux (or Eudes), French nobleman (d. 1086)
- Roger I of Sicily, Norman nobleman (approximate date)
- Sikelgaita, Lombard duchess of Apulia (d. 1090)
- Wulfnoth Godwinson, English nobleman (d. 1094)
- Xiao Guanyin, Chinese empress consort of the Liao dynasty (d. 1075)
- Zayn al-Din Gorgani, Persian physician (d. 1136) (approximate date)

== Deaths ==
- January 17 – Masʽud I, Ghaznavid sultan (b. 998)
- March 3 – Cunigunde, Holy Roman Empress
- March 17 – Harold Harefoot, king of England
- May 29 – Renauld I, French nobleman
- June 21 – Fulk III of Anjou, French nobleman (b. 970)
- August 14 – Duncan I, king of Scotland
- October 1 – Alan III, duke of Brittany (b. 997)
- Abu Hashim al-Hasan, Zaidi imam and ruler of Jemen
- Abu Nasr Mushkan, Persian statesman (or 1039)
- Ali Daya, Ghaznavid commander-in-chief, executed
- Begtoghdi, Ghaznavid commander-in-chief, executed
- Bertha of Milan, Lombard duchess (approximate date)
- Dietrich I, bishop of Meissen (approximate date)
- Gilbert, Count of Brionne, Norman nobleman (approximate date)
- Helias of Cologne, Irish abbot and musician
- Hugh, Italian nobleman (approximate date)
- Hugh I, count of Empúries and Peralada
- Ibn al-Haytham, Arab astronomer (approximate date)
- John V, duke of Gaeta (approximate date)
- Maria of Amalfi, Lombard duchess (approximate date)
- Nikephoros Dokeianos, Byzantine general
- Unsuri, Persian poet and writer (or 1039)
- Yeshe-Ö, Tibetan lama-king (approximate date)
