= Odo IV =

Odo IV may refer to:

- Odo of Champagne (ca. 1040 – 1115)
- Odo IV of Burgundy (1295–1350)
