= Stephen II of Troyes =

French count

Stephen II of Troyes (died 1047), in French called Etienne, was a Count of Troyes and Meaux from 1037 to 1047. He was the son of (Eudes) Odo II, Count of Blois and, Chartres, Champagne, Troyes and Meaux, and of Ermengarde of Auvergne.

He married Adèle and had a son, Eudes II who was Count of Troyes and of Meaux, then of Aumale.

== Sources ==
- Evergates, Theodore, ed. (1999). Aristocratic Women in Medieval France. University of Pennsylvania Press.

Preceded by Odo I	Count of Troyes; 1037–1047	Succeeded by Odo II
Preceded by Odo I	Count of Meaux; 1037–1047	Succeeded by Odo II
