= William Crassus =

13th-century Anglo-Norman

William Crassus I aka Le Gros or Gras (died 1219) was an Anglo-Norman noble. He was the son of Stephen II Le Gros and his wife Margaret, daughter of Roger de Mortimer.

Through his father he descended from the House of Blois.

He inherited Sodbury from his uncle, William le Gros. William was granted a licence to hold fairs and markets in (what is now) Chipping Sodbury in 1217.

William was appointed Seneschal of Normandy in 1203 by King John of England. He was a noted kinsman and follower of the elder William Marshal, 1st Earl of Pembroke.

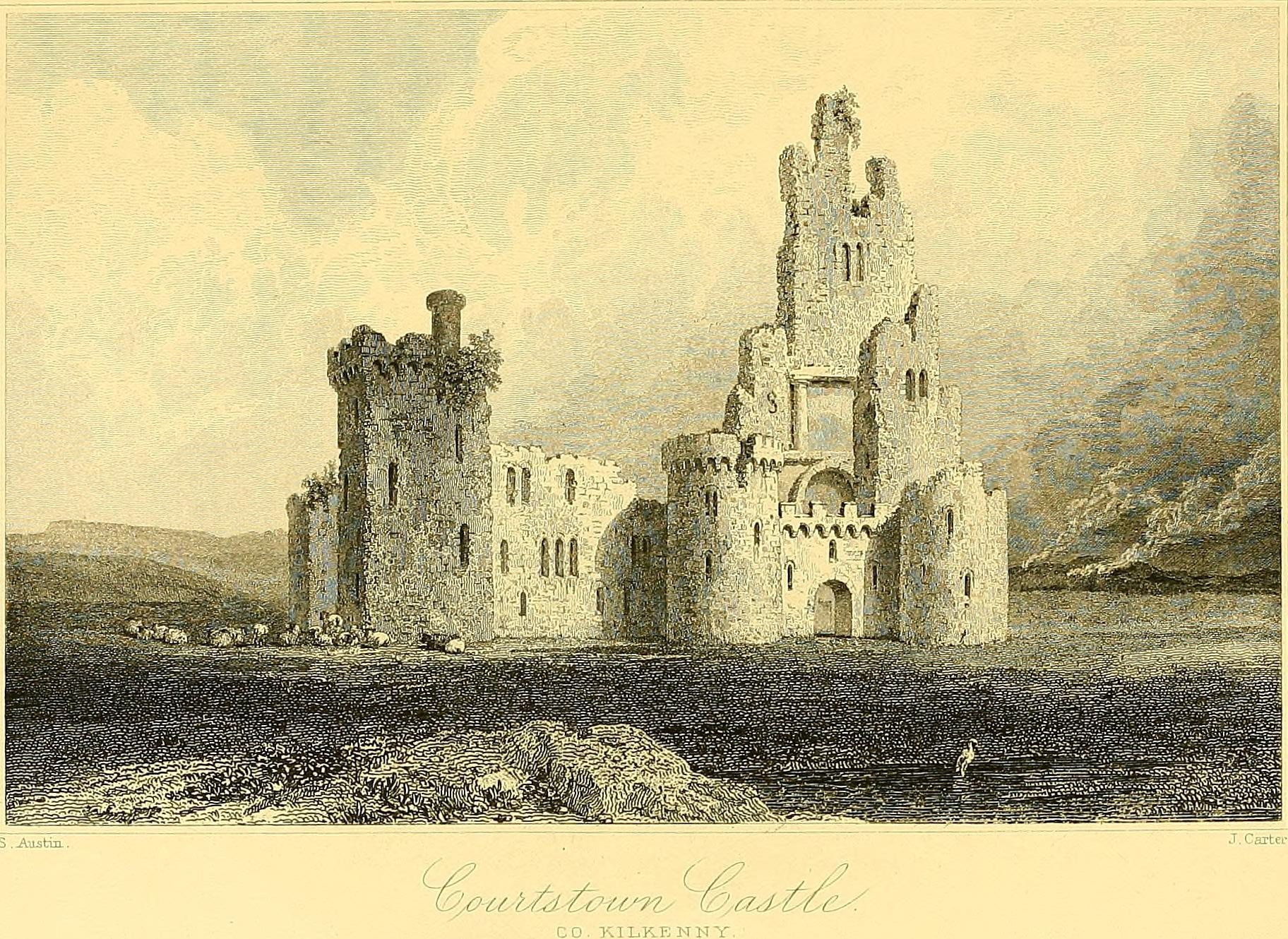
Grace Courtstown Castle, ca. 1832

William Crassus exchanged with the Wellands family his inherited lands in Chipping Sodbury for land in modern day County Kilkenny, Ireland, at Courtstown near Tullaroan, where he built the Grace Courtstown Castle.

During the sixteenth century, this castle was raised to the ground by the Geraldines (FitzGeralds) as the Le Gros/Grace family took the English side with the Butler's against Fitzgerald and Earl of Desmond in the Geraldine rebellion wars 1579.

The limited remains of the castle include an outline of foundation line in blue stone in a farm field. There is a plaque erected at the site of the castle marking the land of the castle which is owned by the farmer Mrs Holmes.

William Crassus I married Margaret, daughter of Robert Fitz Warren. By Margaret he had at least one son, his namesake, William Crassus, or Le Gros.
