= Lambert II of Lens =

French nobleman (died 1054)

Lambert II, Count of Lens
- Born: Circa 1030
- Died: 1054
- Spouse: Adelaide of Normandy
- Issue: Judith of Lens
- Father: Eustace I, Count of Boulogne
- Mother: Maud of Louvain

Lambert II, Count of Lens (died 1054) was a French nobleman. He was born about 1030 making him about 24 years old at his death in 1054.

He was the son of Eustace I, Count of Boulogne and of Maud of Louvain (daughter of Lambert I of Louvain). In c. 1053 he married Adelaide of Normandy, Countess of Aumale, daughter of Robert I, Duke of Normandy and sister of William the Conqueror. Adelaide was the widow of Enguerrand II, Count of Ponthieu who died in 1053. In c. 1054 Lambert and Adelaide had a daughter, Judith of Lens, although Lambert would scarcely have seen her, as he was killed at the battle of Lille in 1054. Lambert was at the battle supporting Baldwin V, Count of Flanders against Henry III, Holy Roman Emperor. His widow, Adelaide, married, thirdly, Odo, Count of Champagne.
