= Milk parsley =

Milk parsley is a common name for several plants and may refer to:

- Ligusticopsis wallichiana (syn. Selinum wallichianum), native to the Himalayas and cultivated as a garden plant
- Peucedanum palustre, native throughout Europe and Central Asia and with a broad distribution in the British Isles. Formerly; Selinum palustre.
- Peucedanum verticillare, a herbaceous plant in the genus Peucedanum of the family Apiaceae, found in SE Europe and Asia
- Selinum carvifolia, or Cambridge milk parsley, native in much of Europe, with a restricted distribution in the British Isles
