= Adelaide of Normandy =

Countess of Aumale from 1069 to 1090

Countess of Aumale
- Reign: 1069–1090
- Born: c. 1030
- Died: before 1090
- Spouses: Enguerrand II, Count of Ponthieu; Lambert II, Count of Lens; Odo, Count of Champagne
- Issue: Adelaide of Ponthieu; Judith of Lens; Stephen, Count of Aumale
- House: Normandy
- Father: Robert the Magnificent

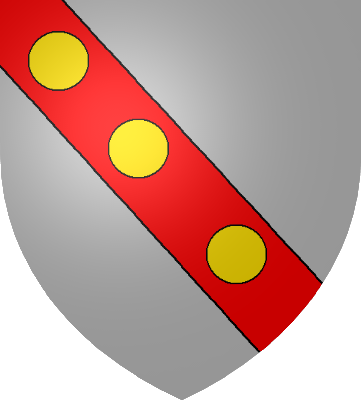

Adelaide of Normandy (or Adeliza) (c. 1030 – bef. 1090) was the ruling Countess of Aumale in her own right in 1069–1087. She was the sister of William the Conqueror.

== Life ==
Born c. 1030, Adelaide was an illegitimate daughter of the Norman duke Robert the Magnificent. Adelaide's brother or half-brother, Robert's son and successor William the Conqueror, was likewise illegitimate. (Note: The question of who her mother was remains unsettled. Elisabeth van Houts ['Les femmes dans l'histoire du duché de Normandie', Tabularia « Études », n° 2, 2002, (10 July 2002), p. 23, n. 22] makes the argument that Robert of Torigny in the GND II, p. 272 (one of three mentions in this volume of her being William's sister) calls her in this instance William's 'uterine' sister' (soror uterina) and is of the opinion this is a mistake similar to one he made regarding Richard II, Duke of Normandy and his paternal half-brother William, Count of Eu (calling them 'uterine' brothers). Based on this she concludes Adelaide was a daughter of Duke Robert by a different concubine. Kathleen Thompson ["Being the Ducal Sister: The Role of Adelaide of Aumale", Normandy and Its Neighbors, Brepols, (2011) p. 63] cites the same passage in GND as did Elisabeth Van Houts, specifically GND II, 270-2, but gives a different opinion. She noted that Robert de Torigni stated here she was the uterine sister of Duke William "so we might perhaps conclude that she shared both mother and father with the Conqueror." But as Torigni wrote a century after Adelaide's birth and in that same sentence in the GND made a genealogical error, she concludes that the identity of Adelaide's mother remains an open question.)

Adelaide's first marriage to Enguerrand II, Count of Ponthieu potentially gave William a powerful ally in upper Normandy. But at the Council of Reims in 1049, when the marriage of William with Matilda of Flanders was prohibited based on consanguinity, so were those of Eustace II, Count of Boulogne and Enguerrand of Ponthieu, who was already married to Adelaide. Adelaide's marriage was apparently annulled c. 1049/50 and another marriage was arranged for her, this time to Lambert II, Count of Lens, younger son of Eustace I, Count of Boulogne forming a new marital alliance between Normandy and Boulogne. Lambert was killed in 1054 at Lille, aiding Baldwin V, Count of Flanders against Emperor Henry III.

Now widowed, Adelaide resided at Aumale, probably part of her dower from her first husband, Enguerrand, or part of a settlement after the capture of Guy of Ponthieu, her brother-in-law. (Note: Prior to it becoming a small county, Aumale was a town on the Bresle river in north-eastern Normandy. It came into the family by way of Enguerrand's mother, the heiress of Aumale. It was settled on Adelaide of Normandy as a countship by her brother William the Conqueror, but at what exact time is not known. Adelaide was the first countess followed by her son Stephen of Aumale as the second holder but first count. See Cokayne, The Complete Peerage, Vol. I, p. 350.) As a dowager Adelaide began a semi-religious retirement and became involved with the Abbey of Saint-Martin d'Auchy, presenting them with a number of gifts. In 1060 she was called upon again to form another marital alliance, this time to a younger man, Odo, Count of Champagne. Odo seems to have been something of a disappointment as he appears on only one of the Conqueror's charters and received no land in England; his wife being a tenant-in-chief in her own right.

In 1082, William and his wife, Matilda, gave to the abbey of the Holy Trinity in Caen the town of Le Homme in the Cotentin with a provision to the Countess of Albamarla (Aumale), his sister, for a life tenancy. In 1086, as Comitissa de Albatnarla, as she was listed in the Domesday Book, was shown as having numerous holdings in both Suffolk and Essex, one of the very few Norman noblewomen to have held lands in England at Domesday as a tenant-in-chief. She was also given the lordship of Holderness which was held after her death by her third husband, Odo, the by then disinherited count of Champagne; the lordship then passed to their son, Stephen. Adelaide died before 1090.

== Family ==
Adelaide married three times; first to Enguerrand II, Count of Ponthieu (died 25 October 1053), Saint-Aubin-sur-Scie, Normandy, France by whom she had a daughter:

- Adelaide (or Adelisa), of Aumale living 1096, m. William de Moyon.

She married, secondly, Lambert II, Count of Lens (died 1054); by whom they had a daughter:

- Judith of Lens, m. Waltheof Earl of Huntingdon and Northumbria.

Adelaide married, thirdly, in 1060, Odo, Count of Champagne (d. aft. 1096), by whom she had a son:

- Stephen, Count of Aumale.

Stephen married Hawise (b 1084) at Wigmore, daughter of Ralph de Mortimer (b 1055) France, (father Roger b 1020-1084) Lord of Wigmore and Seigneur de St. Victor-en-Caux, and Mélisende. Their children were :

1. Adelize León formerly Aumale Born after 1100. Daughter of Etienne (Champagne) de Troyes and Hawise (Mortimer) de Troyes Sister of Enguerrand d'Aumale, William (Aumale) le Gros, Agnes (Aumale) Bruce and Mathilde (Aumale) de Picquigny Wife of Herve II of Léon Children Mother of Guihomar de León Died 1130 before age 30

2. William (c. 1101 – 1179), Count of Aumale; married Cecily of Skipton, daughter of William fitz Duncan. Named Hawise le Gros

3. Étienne, (born c. 1112) mentioned 1150; married the daughter of Roger Mortimer b France their son was William Crassus who inherited from his uncle Chipping Sodbury manor, the mill and market he followed William Marshal to Kilkenny Ireland. Primogeniture to the Grace family Courtstown Kilkenny.

4. Enguerrand or Ingelran de Aumale, mentioned 1150

5. Agnès (c. 1117 – after 1170), married William de Roumare († 1151), son of William de Roumare, Earl of Lincoln. By him she had a son named William. As his widow she secondly married (1128) Adam I de Brus, Lord of Skelton, the son of Robert de Brus, 1st Lord of Annandale. By him she had a son named Adam.

6. Mathilde d'Aumâle, who married Gérard de Picquigny

== Notes ==
French nobility
Preceded by	Countess of Aumale; 1069–1090	Succeeded by Stephen
