= County and duchy of Aumale =

French nobility in Normandy

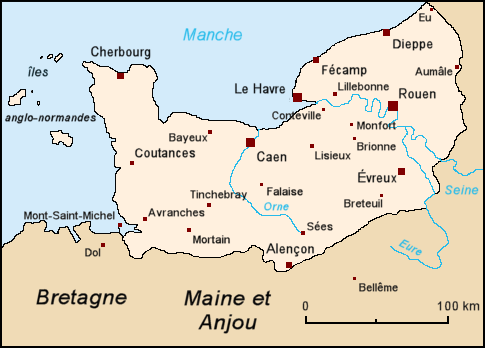
Map of Normandy

The County of Aumale, later elevated to a Duchy, was a medieval fief in the Duchy of Normandy, disputed between France and England during parts of the Hundred Years' War.

== Norman nobility ==
Aumale was a medieval fief in the Duchy of Normandy and, after 1066, of the King of England. According to Chisholm, the fief of Aumale was granted by the archbishop of Rouen to Odo, brother-in-law of William the Conqueror, who erected it into a countship. Thompson wrote that it was given to Adelaide, William's half-sister, as a dower by her first husband Enguerrand; it then passed jure uxoris to her second and third husbands, Lambert and Odo. In the Domesday Book of 1086, Adelaide is recorded as the Countess of Aumale, with holdings in Suffolk and Essex. In 1087 Odo received the Lordship of Holderness, and at some time before 1090 Adelaide's holdings were passed to their son, Stephen. In 1102 the fief, with Odo's lands in Holderness, passed to their son, Stephen.

=== Lords ===
Norman counts:

- Guerinfroi, lord before 996–?
- Guerinfroi Aymard (son) ?–1048
- Bertha of Aumale (daughter) 1048–1052
  - Hugh II of Ponthieu 1048–1052 (married to Bertha)
- Enguerrand I of Aumale (married Adelaide of Normandy, who retained the lordship after her husband's death)
- Adelaide of Normandy 1053–1087 with
  - Lambert of Boulogne 1053–1054 (married to Adelaide)

=== Counts ===
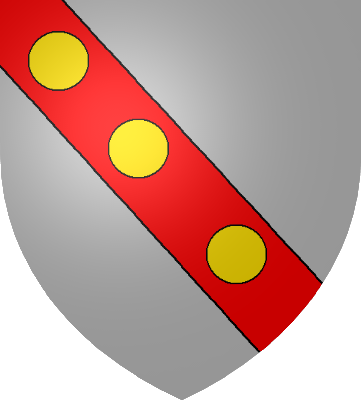
Coat of arms of the Counts of Aumale, adopted late 12th century, at start of age of heraldry

Anglo-Norman counts:

- Odo of Troyes 1069–1115 (married to Adelaide)
- Stephen of Aumale before 1070–1127
- William le Gros 1127–1179
- Hawise of Aumale 1179–1194 with her husbands as Counts jure uxoris:
  - William de Mandeville, 3rd Earl of Essex 1180–1189
  - William de Forz 1189–1194
  - Baldwin of Béthune 1195–1196
- confiscated; to French royal domain. The English kings continued to recognise the title, as Earl of Albemarle (see English peerage section below)

== French nobility ==
In 1196, Philip II of France captured the castle of Aumale, and granted the title of "Count of Aumale" to Renaud de Dammartin. It was later held by the houses of Castile, Harcourt, and Lorraine. After several extinctions the title was re-created in 1547 for Francis, then styled Count of Aumale by courtesy. On his accession as Duke of Guise, he ceded it to his brother Claude, Duke of Aumale. It was later used as a title by Henri d'Orléans, the youngest son of Louis-Philippe, King of the French and Duke of Orléans.

As of 2019, the titleholder is a grandson of the late Henri, Count of Paris, Orléans heir, and his wife, Princess Isabelle of Orléans-Braganza of Brazil. Prince Foulques, Duke of Aumale, son of Prince Jacques, Duke of Orléans and the duchess, née Gersende de Sabran-Pontèves, added it to his title of Comte d'Eu.

=== Counts (House of Dammartin) ===
French Counts:

- Reginald I of Dammartin 1224–1227
- Mathilda de Dammartin 1227–1260, also Countess of Clermont-en-Beauvaisis and Queen of Portugal and the Algarve by her two marriages, Countess of Mortain, Countess of Boulogne and Countess of Dammartin with
  - Philip Hurepel 1227–1234, Count of Clermont-en-Beauvaisis (married to Mathilde)
  - Alphonso of Portugal 1238–1253, later King of Portugal and the Algarve (married to Mathilde)
- Simon of Dammartin 1234–1239, also Count of Ponthieu by his marriage
- Joan of Dammartin 1239–1278, also Countess of Ponthieu, sometime Countess of Mortain and Queen of Castile by her marriage, with

=== Counts (House of Castile) ===
Coat of arms Infante Ferdinand of Castile, Count of Aumale and Baron of Montgomery

- Ferdinand I 1239–1252, King of Castile (married to Joan)
- Ferdinand II, Count of Aumale 1252–1260 (son of Joan and Ferdinand I)
- John I 1260–1302 (son of Ferdinand II)
- John II 1302–1343 (married to Catherine of Artois, daughter of Philip of Artois and Blanche of Brittany)
- Blanche of Ponthieu 1343–1387 with

=== Counts (House of Harcourt) ===
- John III 1343–1356 (husband of Blanche)
- John IV 1356–1389 (son)
- John V 1389–1452 (son)
  - John VI, de facto 1415–1424 (son)
- Mary, de facto 1424–1452, de jure to 1476 (sister), with

=== Counts (House of Lorraine-Vaudémont) ===
Coat of Arms of the Dukes of Guise

- Antoine, Count of Vaudémont 1452–1458 (married to Marie)
- John VI 1458–1473 (son of Antoine and Marie)
- René 1473–1508 (nephew of John)
- Claude I 1508–1547

=== Dukes ===
Coat of Arms of the Dukes of Aumale of the Lorraine family

- Francis 1547–1550
- Claude II 1550–1573
- Charles 1573–1595
- Anne 1618–1638 (countess of Maulévrier)
- Henry of Savoy, Duke of Nemours 1618–1632 (married to Anne)
- Louis of Savoy 1638–1641 (also Duke of Nemours)
- Charles Amadeus of Savoy 1641–1652 (also Duke of Nemours)
- to royal domain
- Marie Jeanne Baptiste of Savoy-Nemours
- Louis Charles de Bourbon (1701–1773)
- sold to the crown, but payment not made, so returned to the heir
- Louis Jean Marie of Bourbon (1776–1793)
- Henri d'Orléans, Duke of Aumale (1822–1897)

== English peerage ==
Through the end of the Hundred Years' War, the kings of England at various times ruled Aumale, through their claims to be dukes of Normandy and later, kings of France. The title of Count or Duke of Aumale was granted several times during this period.

=== Earls (1095) ===
In 1196, Philip II of France captured the castle of Aumale (and, subsequently, the remainder of Normandy). The kings of England continued to claim the Duchy of Normandy, and to recognize the old line of Counts or Earls of Aumale. These were:

- see above for Counts before 1196
- Hawise of Aumale, 2nd Countess of Aumale (died 1214), married, bef. 1196:
  - Baldwin of Bethune (died 1212), Count of Aumale jure uxoris

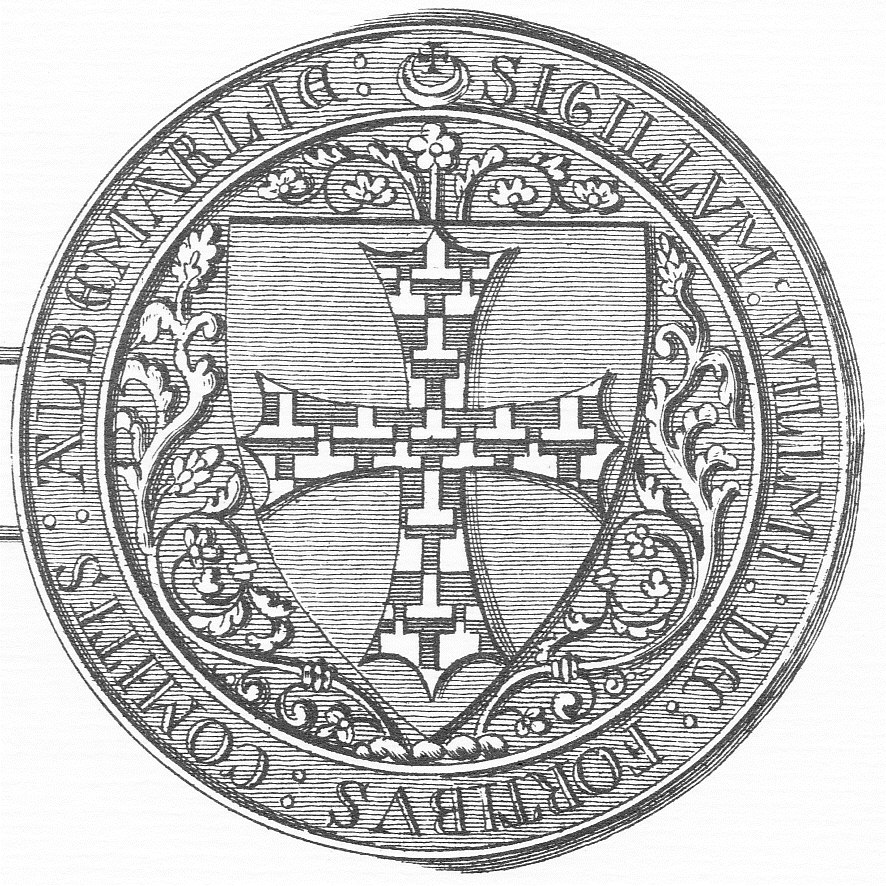
Seal of William de Forz, 4th Earl of Albemarle. Arms: A cross patonce

- William de Forz, 3rd Earl of Albemarle (died 1242), son of the 2nd Countess by her second husband William de Forz (died 1195)
- William de Forz, 4th Earl of Albemarle (died 1260), son of the 3rd Earl
- Thomas de Forz, 5th Earl of Albemarle (died 1269), son of the 4th Earl
- Aveline de Forz, Countess of Albemarle (died 1274), daughter of the 4th Earl

Aveline married Edmund Crouchback, 1st Earl of Lancaster, in 1269, but she died without issue in 1274. A claim upon the inheritance by John de Eston (de Ashton) was settled in 1278 with the surrender of the earldom to the Crown.

=== Dukes, first creation (1385) ===
also: Duke of Gloucester (1385–1397), Earl of Essex (1376–1397), Earl of Buckingham (1377)

- Thomas of Woodstock, Duke of Gloucester (died 1397), fifth son of Edward III, was created Duke of Aumale by writ of summons on 3 September 1385, but was also made Duke of Gloucester very soon after, and seems never to have used the former title. It was almost certainly forfeit upon his murder while awaiting trial for treason.

Note: This creation is not listed in several sources such as "The Complete Peerage", which indicates the creation shown below as the 1st.

=== Dukes, second creation (1397) ===
also: Duke of York (1385), Earl of Cambridge (1362–1414), Earl of Rutland (1390–1402), Earl of Cork (c. 1396)

- Edward of Norwich, 1st Earl of Rutland (died 1415), first son of Edmund of Langley, 1st Duke of York (himself fourth son of Edward III), was created Duke of Aumale shortly after Woodstock's murder, but was deprived of the title by Henry IV Bolingbroke in 1399. Edward is referred to in Shakespeare's Richard II as the "Duke of Aumerle"

=== Earls (1412) ===
also: Duke of Clarence (1412)

- Thomas of Lancaster, Duke of Clarence (1387–1421), second son of Henry IV Bolingbroke, was created Earl of Aumale along with his dukedom of Clarence, and carried both titles until his death without issue.

=== Counts (1422) ===
also: Earl of Warwick (1088)

- Richard Beauchamp, 13th Earl of Warwick (1382–1439), military commander under Henry V in France, was created Count of Aumale for life only.

In further creations in the English peerage after the Hundred Years' War, Aumale was spelled in the Latinised form Albemarle. For these, see Duke of Albemarle and Earl of Albemarle.
