= Odo of Champagne =

French nobleman (c. 1036 – 1115)

Odo
- Count of Champagne

Count of Troyes and Meaux
- Reign: 1047–1066
- Born: c. 1040
- Died: 1115
- Noble family: Blois
- Spouse: Adelaide of Normandy
- Issue: Stephen of Aumale
- Father: Stephen II of Troyes and Meaux
- Mother: Adele

Odo (Modern French: Eudes; c. 1040 – 1115) was count of Troyes and of Meaux from 1047 to 1066, then count of Aumale from 1069 to 1115. He was later also known as the count of Champagne and as Eudes II of Troyes.

== Biography ==
Odo was the son of Stephen II of Troyes and Meaux, and Adele. He was still a minor at the death of his father, and his uncle Theobald III of Blois acted as regent of Troyes.

In 1060, Odo married Adelaide of Normandy, daughter of Duke Robert I of Normandy and widow of Enguerrand II, Count of Ponthieu, Lord of Aumale and Lambert II, Count of Lens. After the death of Enguerrand's only daughter Adelaide, her mother Adelaide of Normandy became her heir and hence through his marriage Odo acquired the title Count (or Earl) of Aumale in Normandy Jure uxoris (by right of his wife).

Adelaide (sometime called Adeliza) was also sister of William the Conqueror, and Odo accompanied his brother-in-law in the Norman Conquest of England (1066). Theobald III of Blois then seized Odo's counties in the Champagne region, One version states William I, for his services in the conquest gave Odo Holderness in Yorkshire. Another proposes that the Lordship of Holderness was granted to William's sister Adelaide, in 1087, and Odo became Earl of Holderness by right of his wife.

Odo was, with Alan Rufus and Roger of Poitou, one of the commanders of the army sent by King William II to besiege William de St-Calais at Durham Castle after the Rebellion of 1088, and who signed St-Calais's guarantee of personal safety.

Odo was implicated in a plot to place his son Stephen of Aumale on the English throne. Stephen was the first cousin of brothers William Rufus, King of England and Robert Curthose, Duke of Normandy. Stephen was apparently not put on trial himself as he may have been out of the king's reach in Normandy. Odo was imprisoned in 1095. Odo lost his English lands for his complicity but they were restored to Stephen two years after the death of William Rufus.

== Family ==
Odo had one son with Adelaide, Stephen of Aumale (died 1127).

In 1902 Richard Langrishe published a paper in which he put forward the theory that Odo was the primogenitor of the Irish family of Le Gras (Grace). This amended an older theory that Raymond FitzGerald (died 1185/1198) was the primogenitor. However, Richard Roach (1970) upheld the older proposition, but more recently M. T. Flanagan (2004) disagreed with Roach because FitzGerald had no known legitimate heirs.

== Notes ==
| Preceded by Stephen II | Count of Troyes; 1047–1066 | Succeeded by Theobald III |
| Preceded by Stephen II | Count of Meaux; 1047–1066 | Succeeded by Theobald III |
