= Aumale =

- Commune
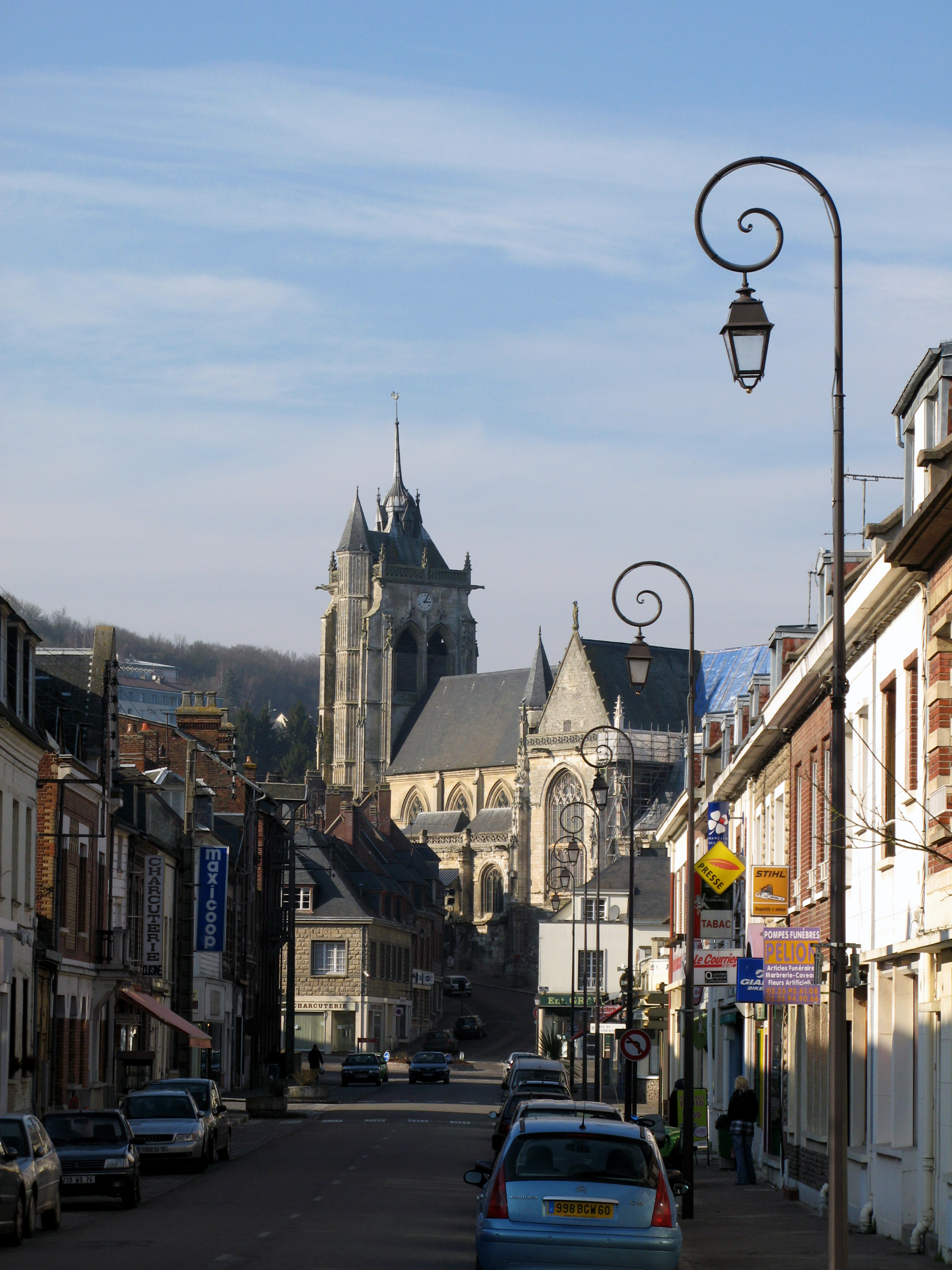
- The town centre and church in Aumale

- Coat of arms
- Location of Aumale
- Location within France Location within Normandy
- Coordinates: 49°46′17″N 1°45′11″E
- Country: France
- Region: Normandy
- Department: Seine-Maritime
- Arrondissement: Dieppe
- Canton: Gournay-en-Bray
- Intercommunality: CC Aumale - Blangy-sur-Bresle

Government
  - Mayor (2026–32): François Sellier
- Area^{1}: 9.06 km^{2} (3.50 sq mi)
- Elevation: 130 m (430 ft)
- Highest elevation: 212 m (696 ft)
- Lowest elevation: 106 m (348 ft)
- Population (2023): 1,996
  - Density: 220/km^{2} (571/sq mi)
- Time zone: UTC+01:00 (CET)
  - Summer (DST): UTC+02:00 (CEST)
- INSEE/Postal code: 76035 /76390
- ^{1} French Land Register data, which excludes lakes, ponds, glaciers > 1 km^{2} (0.386 sq mi or 247 acres) and river estuaries.

Aumale (French pronunciation: [omal]), formerly known as Albemarle, is a commune in the Seine-Maritime department in the Normandy region in north-western France. It lies on the River Bresle.

== History ==
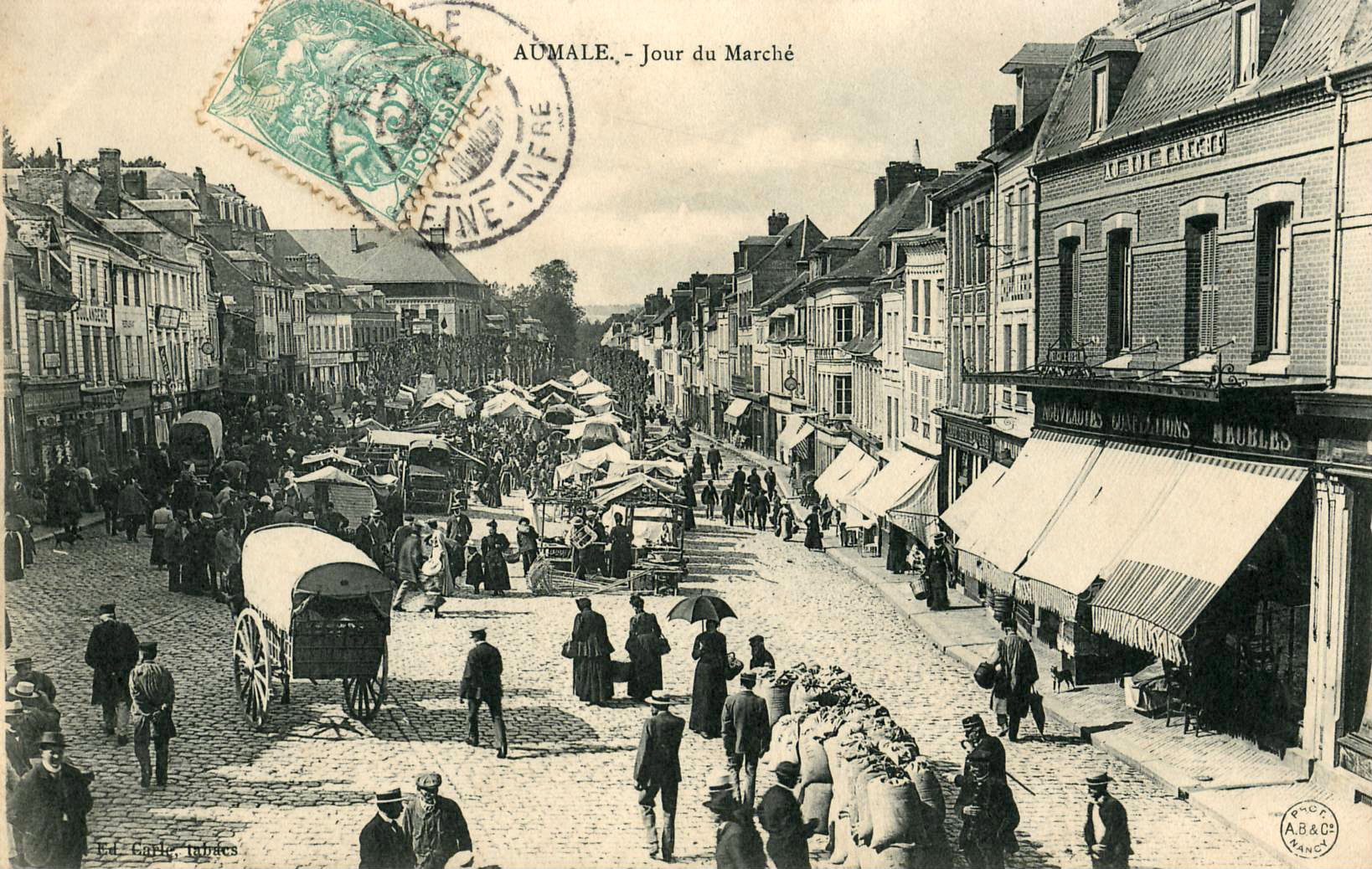
Aumale in the early 20th century

The town's Latin name was Alba Marla. It was raised by William the Bastard into a county, for his half-sister, Adelaide of Normandy. It was then held by various Norman and English nobles until its confiscation in 1196 by Philip II of France. Thereafter it was held by the houses of Dammartin, Castile, Harcourt, and Lorraine. In 1547, it was raised to the status of a duchy for Francis of Lorraine. It passed to the house of Savoy, from whom Louis XIV purchased the title in 1675 in order to bestow it upon one of his bastards as an appanage. In 1769, it passed to the House of Orléans. The English Earls of Albemarle, meanwhile, also derive their name from the area.

During World War II, the town was occupied by Germany. The SS operated a subcamp of the V SS construction brigade, in which over 500 men, mostly Poles and Soviets, worked as slave labour on the construction of facilities for the V-1 flying bombs. The prisoners tried to resist the Germans, and several were murdered for sabotaging the rockets or escape attempts. In August 1944, due to Allied advance, the Germans dissolved the subcamp and deported its prisoners to subcamps of the Mittelbau-Dora concentration camp.

== Geography ==
A village of farming and associated light industry, situated in the valley of the Bresle of the Norman Pays de Bray in Normandy on the border with Picardy. It is around 34 miles (55 km) southeast of Dieppe at the junction of the D 916, D 920, D 929 and D 49 roads. The A29 autoroute (Saint-Quentin-Beuzeville) passes through the commune's northern sector. Aumale station, on the Beauvais – Le Tréport-Mers railway line, is served by local TER trains.

== Heraldry ==
| Arms of Aumale | The arms of Aumale are blazoned : Argent, on a fess azure, 3 fleurs de lys Or. |

== Population ==
Historical population
| Year | Pop. | ±% p.a. |
|---|---|---|
| 1968 | 2,833 | — |
| 1975 | 2,825 | −0.04% |
| 1982 | 2,876 | +0.26% |
| 1990 | 2,690 | −0.83% |
| 1999 | 2,577 | −0.48% |
| 2007 | 2,428 | −0.74% |
| 2012 | 2,279 | −1.26% |
| 2017 | 2,024 | −2.35% |
| 2023 | 1,996 | −0.23% |
Source: INSEE

== Places of interest ==
- The church of Saints Peter and Paul, dating from the sixteenth century.
- The sixteenth-century Hôtel de ville (town hall).
- A seventeenth-century Hospital.
- The chapel of Our Lady of the Cardonnoy, dating from the thirteenth century.
- The seventeenth-century château du Bois Robin
- The tower and buildings of the 16th-century abbey.

== Twin towns ==
- Csurgó, Hungary, since 1991
- Cuckfield, England, since 1991

== Gallery ==
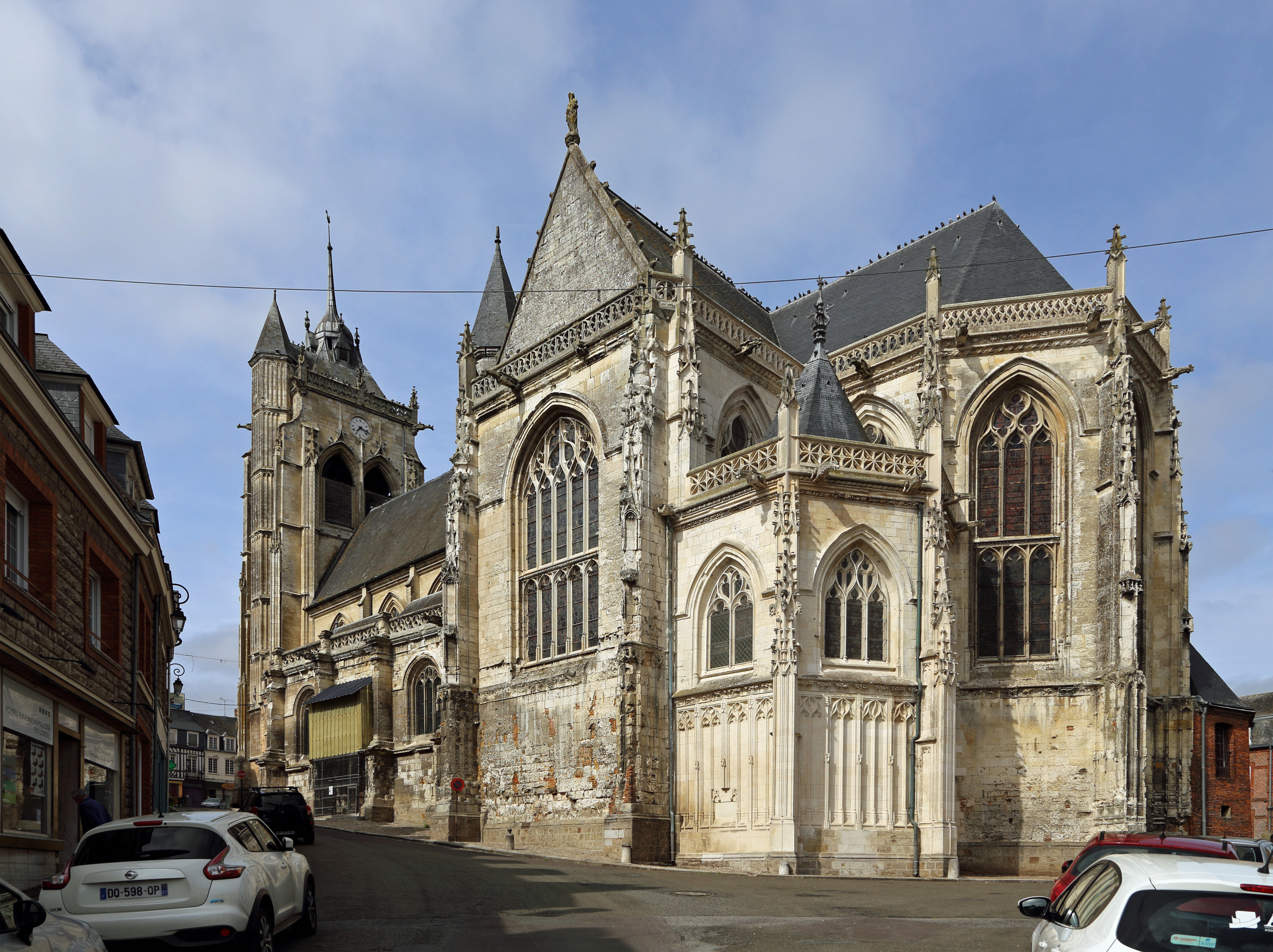
Aumale church

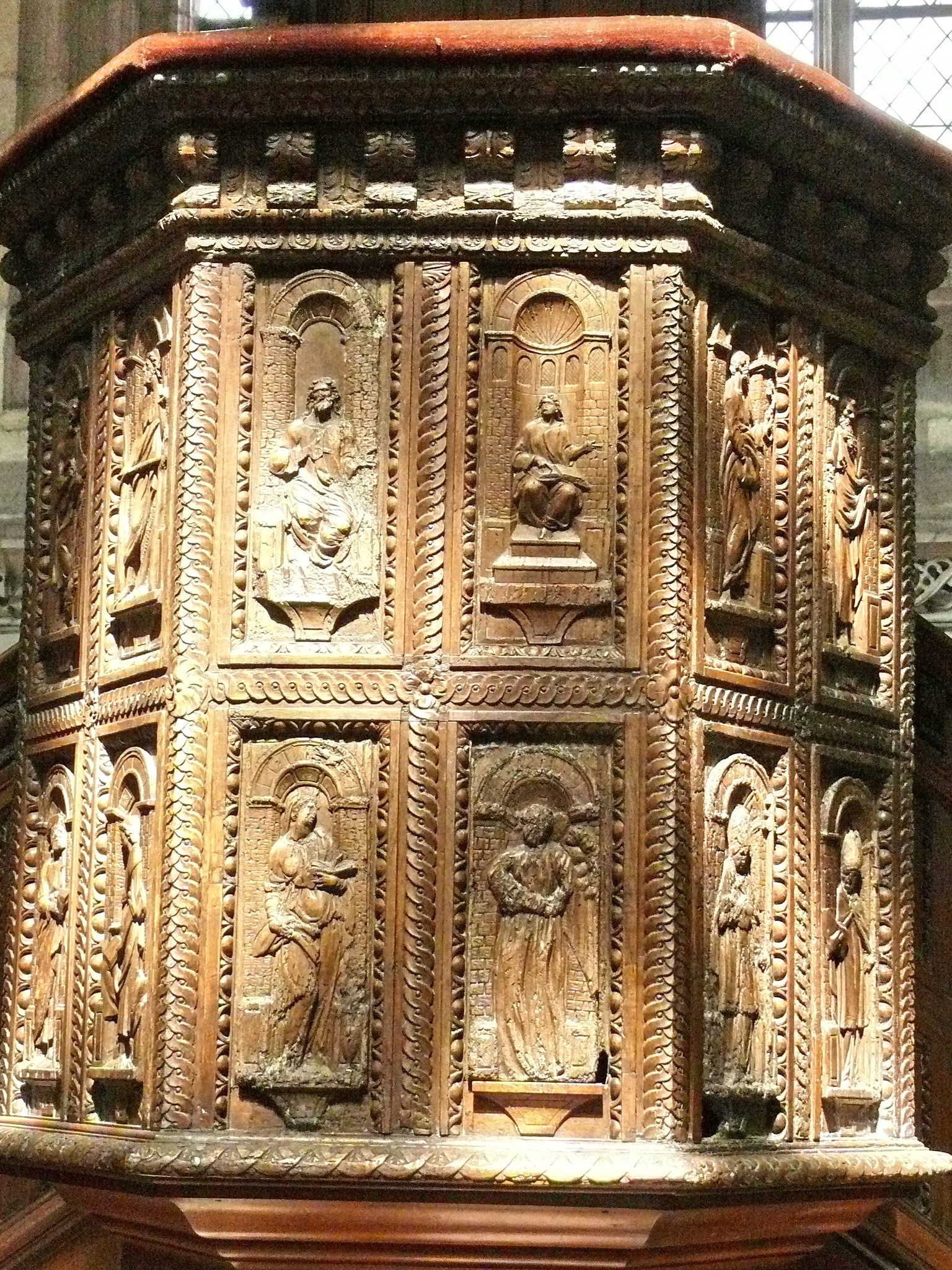
Sculpted wood panels on the pulpit

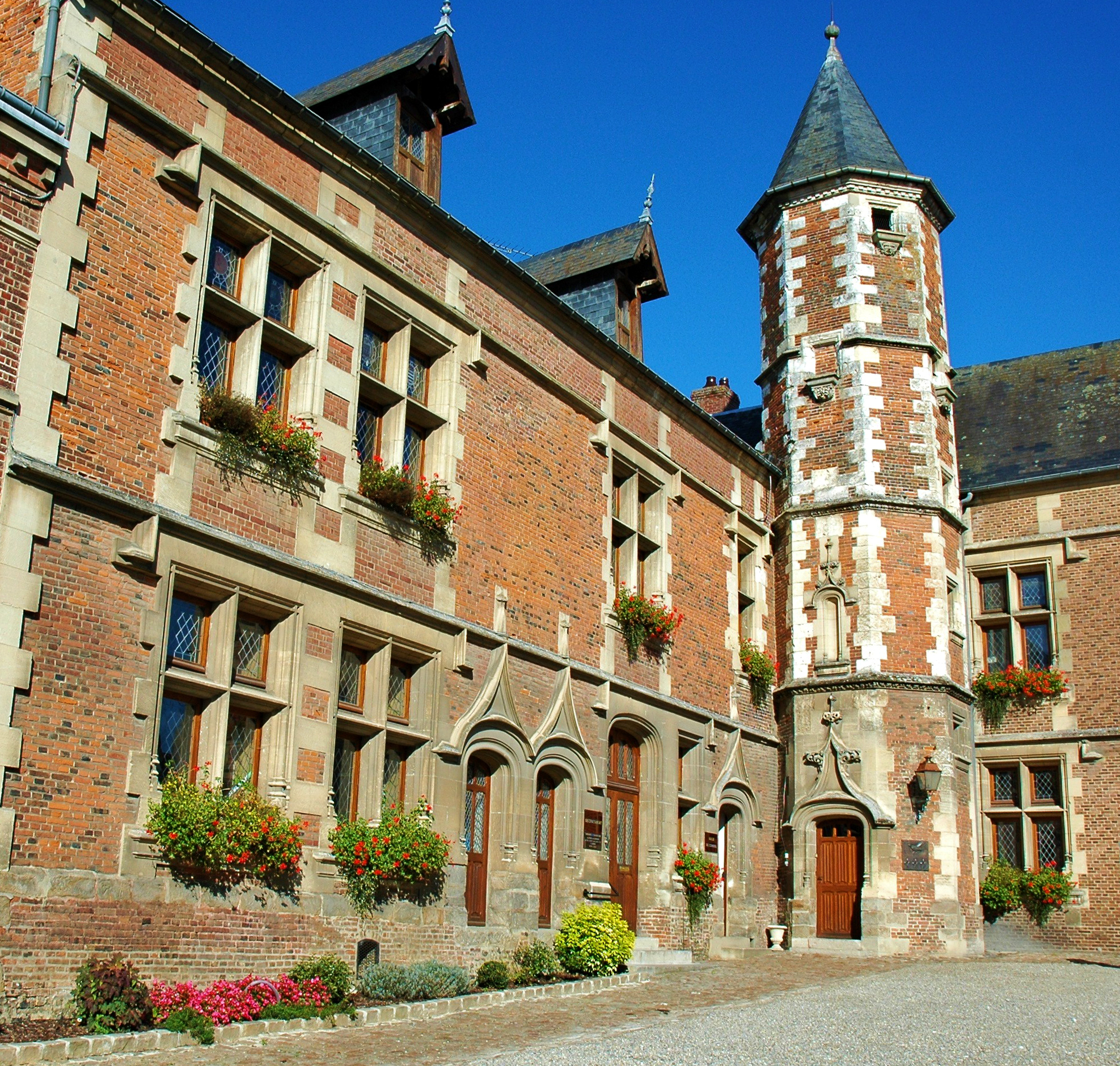
Town hall

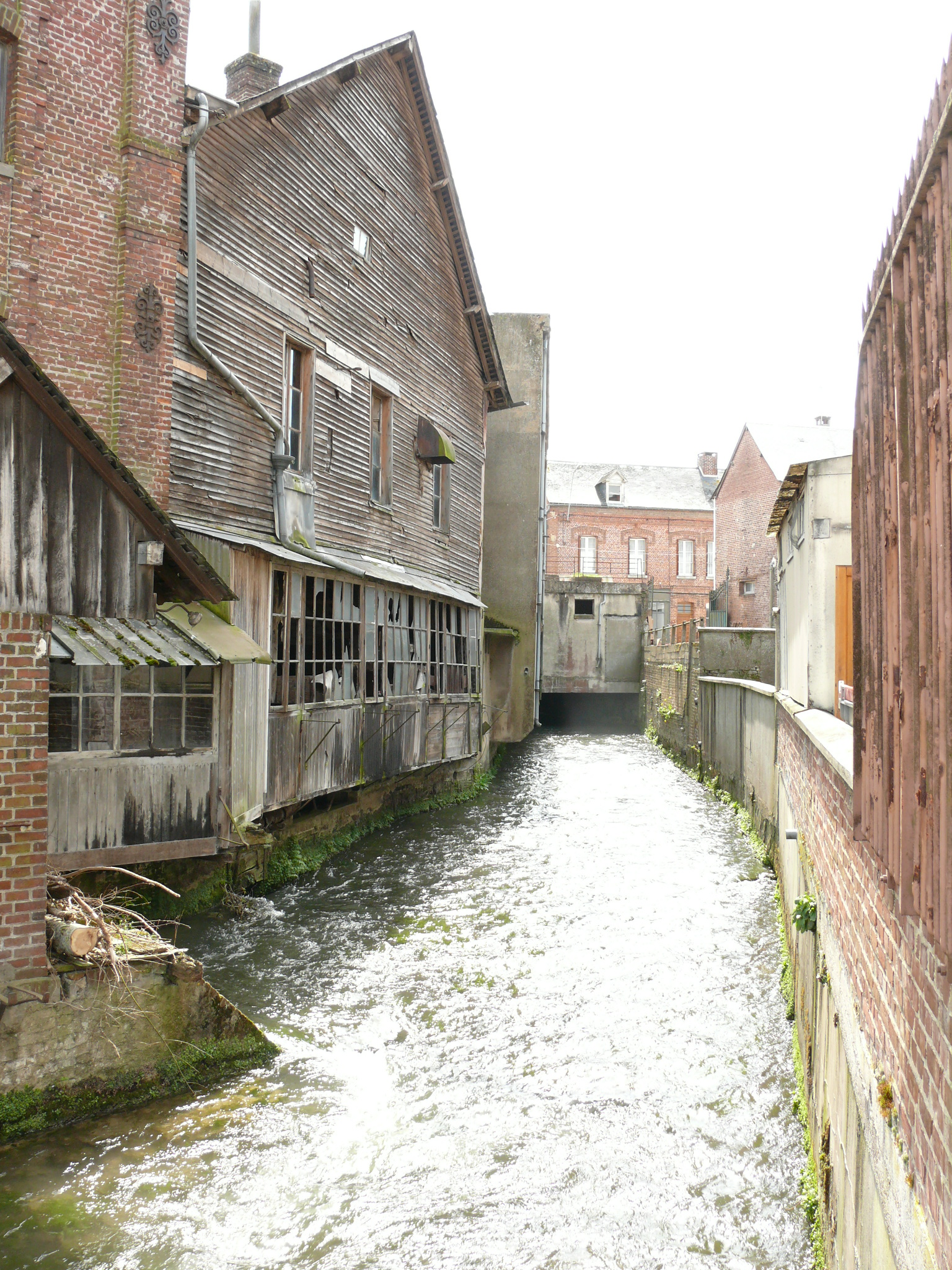
The Bresle river by the Moulin du Roy

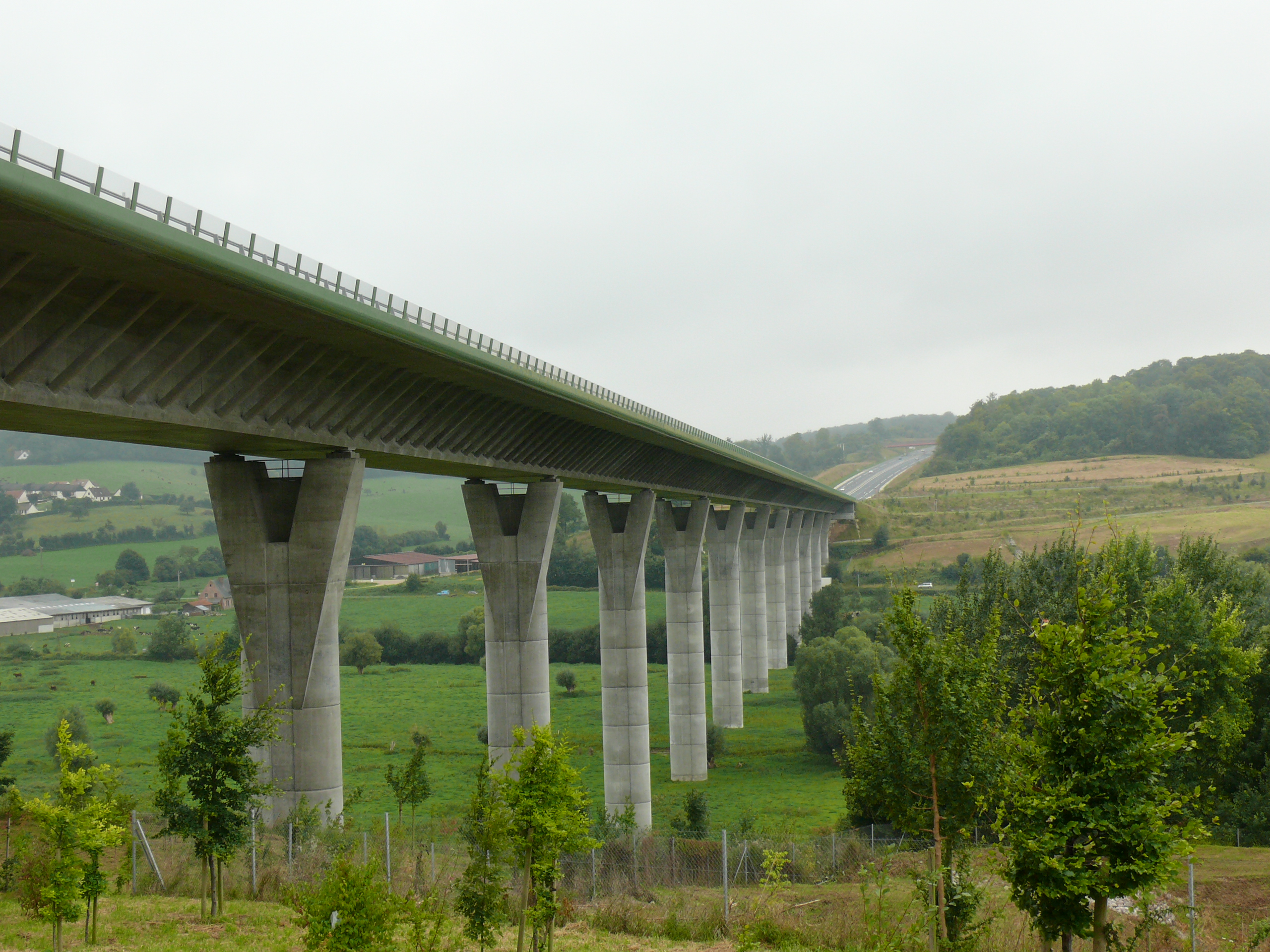
The Bresle Viaduct, 755m long, constructed during 2002–2004 to carry the A29 motorway

== See also ==
- Communes of the Seine-Maritime department
- Counts and Dukes of Aumale
