= Aveline de Forz, Countess of Aumale =

English noblewoman (1259–1274)

Aveline de Forz

Countess of Aumale Lady of Holderness
- Born: 20 January 1259; Burstwick, Yorkshire, England
- Died: 10 November 1274 (15 years); Stockwell, Surrey, England
- Spouse: Edmund Crouchback, 1st Earl of Lancaster (m. 1269; died 1274)
- Dynasty: Plantagenet (by marriage)
- Father: William de Forz, 4th Earl of Albemarle
- Mother: Isabel de Forz, 8th Countess of Devon

Aveline de Forz, Countess of Aumale and Lady of Holderness (20 January 1259 – 10 November 1274) was an English noblewoman. A great heiress, in 1269 she was married to Edmund Crouchback, 1st Earl of Lancaster, the second son of Henry III of England. She died five years later, and the marriage produced no children.

== Life ==
Aveline de Forz was born on 20 January 1259 at Burstwick in Holderness. Her parents were William de Forz, 4th Earl of Albemarle and Isabella Redvers, Countess of Devon and the Isle of Wight.

=== Marriage ===
Queen Eleanor, the consort of Henry III of England, arranged the marriage between Aveline and their second son Edmund Crouchback, 1st Earl of Lancaster. Eleanor negotiated with Aveline's mother Isabella and grandmother Amice to secure the alliance. On 8 or 9 April 1269, Aveline was married to Edmund at Westminster Abbey. Given that Aveline was only ten years old, the marriage was not consummated until 1273, when she turned fourteen. With marriage to the great heiress, the already wealthy Edmund hoped to gain the earldoms of Devon and Aumale as well as the lordships of Holderness and the Isle of Wight. Her last surviving brother, Thomas, died in 1269, and she inherited his titles, becoming Countess of Aumale. Her lands fell into King Henry's custody. However, Aveline died on 10 November 1274 at Stockwell, Surrey, which prevented Edmund from inheriting the lands. They had no children.

Aveline was buried in Westminster Abbey, the first tomb to be placed in its new church. The historian Peter Coss has called the tombs of her and Eleanor of Castile "two of the finest female effigies of the thirteenth century."

Peerage of England
Preceded by Thomas de Forz	Countess of Aumale; 1269–1274	Succeeded by Title defunct
