= William le Gros, Earl of York =

Count of Aumale, Earl of York, and Lord of Holderness

William le Gros, William le Gras, William d'Aumale, William Crassus (died 20 August 1179) was Earl of York and Lord of Holderness in the English peerage and the Count of Aumale in France. He was the eldest son of Stephen, Count of Aumale, and his spouse, Hawise, daughter of Ralph de Mortimer of Wigmore.

William witnessed two charters of King Stephen in 1136, in which he is recorded as Willelmus de Albamarla, but is not placed among the earls. He distinguished himself at the Battle of the Standard in 1138, and was made Earl of York (apart from Richmondshire) as his reward. He was with Stephen in his defeat at Lincoln on 2 February 1141. His Scarborough Castle was forfeited to King Henry II as a result of unauthorised construction during the Anarchy.

He founded the Abbey of Meaux in 1150. He was intombed within the Abbey of Thornton, Lincolnshire, which he had founded in 1139.

William married Cicely, Lady of Skipton, the daughter and co-heir of William Fitz-Duncan by his spouse Alice, Lady of Skipton, daughter of William Meschin, Lord of Copeland. As "lady of Harewood" she brought him vast estates. Dying without male issue, he left a daughter and heiress, Hawise (died 11 March 1214), who succeeded her father in the County of Aumale and Lordship of Holderness.

Hawise married three times, firstly, on 14 January 1180, William de Mandeville, 3rd Earl of Essex. He died without issue 14 January 1189. She married secondly after 3 July 1190, the crusader William de Forz (died 1195), by whom she had her heir and successor. Thirdly, Richard I gave her in marriage to Baldwin of Bethune. All three husbands gained from her the title of Count of Aumale.

== Bibliography ==
- Chisholm, Hugh, ed. (1911). "Albemarle, Earls and Dukes of" . Encyclopædia Britannica. Vol. 1 (11th ed.). Cambridge University Press. pp. 492–493.
- Cokayne, G. E., The Complete Peerage, 1904, volume 1, p. 353.
- Dalton, Paul. "William Earl of York and royal authority in Yorkshire in the reign of Stephen." Haskins Society Journal 2 (1990): 155–65.
- Dalton, Paul. "William le Gros, Count of Aumale and Earl of York." Oxford Dictionary of National Biography (2004) Available at: https://doi.org/10.1093/ref:odnb/47237 (Accessed 21 November 2018).
