= William de Mandeville, 3rd Earl of Essex =

Anglo-Norman nobleman, royal official and crusader (died 1189)

William de Mandeville III

Chief Justiciar of England
- In office 1189 – 14 November 1189
- Monarch: Richard I
- Preceded by: Ranulf de Glanvill
- Succeeded by: Hugh de Puiset

Personal details
- Died: 14 November 1189
- Spouse: Hawise, countess of Aumale
- Occupation: Earl of Essex; Count of Aumale
- Profession: Noble

William de Mandeville, 3rd Earl of Essex (1st Creation) (died 14 November 1189) was a loyal councillor of Henry II and Richard I of England.

William was the second son of Geoffrey de Mandeville, 1st Earl of Essex and Rohese de Vere, Countess of Essex. After his father's death while in rebellion (1144), William grew up at the court of the Count of Flanders. On the death of his elder brother Geoffrey late in 1166, he returned to England and became Earl of Essex, where he spent much time at the court of Henry II. He stayed loyal to the king during the Revolt of 1173–1174, known as the Revolt of the Young King.

In 1177 William became a crusader, in company with Count Philip of Flanders. Philip attempted to intervene in the court politics of the Kingdom of Jerusalem but was rebuffed, and the two fought for the Principality of Antioch at the siege of Harim. William returned to England in the autumn of 1178.

In 1180 William married Hawise, daughter and heiress of William, Count of Aumale, a major Yorkshire lord, who had died the previous year. Earl William gained possession of her lands, both in Normandy and in England, along with the title of Count of Aumale (or Earl of Albemarle as it is sometimes called).

William fought in the wars against the French toward the end of Henry II's reign, and was at the deathbed of that king in 1189. He carried the crown at the coronation of Richard I and enjoyed the favour of the new king. Richard I appointed him one of the two chief justiciars of England. William died at Rouen a few months later on a mission to Normandy, without legitimate issue. He was buried at Mortemar Abbey in Normandy, founded by his Mandeville ancestors. He was succeeded as chief justiciar by his fellow justiciar Hugh de Puiset and the Bishop of Ely, William Longchamp.

The heir to the vast Mandeville estate was William's elderly aunt, Beatrice de Say, née Mandeville, who surrendered her claim to her second but surviving son, Geoffrey de Saye. Geoffrey contracted to pay an unprecedentedly large relief for the Mandeville inheritance, but he rapidly fell into arrears. Geoffrey Fitz Peter, the husband of Beatrice's granddaughter and namesake, Beatrice de Say, was a prominent man at court and used his position to push his wife's claim. She was the eldest daughter of William de Say, Geoffrey's elder but deceased brother, William de Say. The king awarded the Mandeville estates and, eventually, the earldom of Essex to Geoffrey Fitz Peter by right of his wife.

== Notes ==
Political offices
Preceded by Ranulf de Glanvill	Chief Justiciar shared with Hugh de Puiset; 1189	Succeeded by Hugh de Puiset; William de Longchamp
Peerage of England
Preceded by Geoffrey de Mandeville II	Earl of Essex; 1166–1189	Extinct
Preceded by Hawise	Count of Aumale with Hawise; 1180–1189	Succeeded by Hawise
