= Hawise, Countess of Aumale =

Anglo-Norman noblewoman (c. 1160–1214)

Hawise, Countess of Aumale (c. 1160 – 11 March 1214) was ruling Countess of Aumale, (suo jure) from 1179 until 1194, in co-regency with her husbands. She was an heiress of the highest social standing and the greatest financial holdings, and became Countess of Essex by her marriage to William de Mandeville, 3rd Earl of Essex.

== Early life ==
Hawise was the daughter and sole heiress of William le Gros, Count of Aumale and his wife Cicely, daughter and co-heiress of the William fitz Duncan, son of Duncan II of Scotland. Hawise was therefore the great-granddaughter of the King of Alba.

Hawise was named after her paternal grandmother, Hawise de Mortimer, daughter of Ranulph de Mortimer.

== First marriage ==
Hawise was Countess in her own right (suo jure) when she married, on 14 January 1180, to William, Earl of Essex. On his death late in 1189 the widowed Hawise was described by the monk and chronicler Richard of Devizes as "a woman who was almost a man, lacking nothing virile except the virile organs." In addition to her inherited lands in Normandy and England (which included the Honour of Holderness, in the eastern part of Yorkshire), Hawise received in dower one-third of the substantial Mandeville estates, making her a wealthy widow with powerful connections.

There were no children from the marriage, "raising concern about the succession to both the earldom of Essex and the patrimony of Aumale". After a widowhood of less than a year, Hawise remarried.

== Second marriage ==
Hawise's second husband was William de Forz (or in Latin de Fortibus) of Oleron. He was a landless Poitevin knight and naval commander, but was one of the loyal commanders in the crusading fleet of King Richard I. Hawise protested against the match, which is said to have been forced on her by the king. The countess gave birth to a son and heir, also called William. Her second husband died in 1195 and Hawise became "her son's adviser and stalwart supporter."

=== Issue ===
- William de Forz, 3rd Earl of Albemarle (c. 1190 − 26 March 1242). He married Aveline de Montfichet, by whom he had a son, William de Forz, 4th Earl of Albemarle, who succeeded to the Earldom.

== Third marriage ==
King Richard gave Hawise in marriage to Baldwin de Béthune, his companion on crusade and in captivity. Baldwin had previously served King Henry II as ambassador to the count of Flanders in 1178. The following year, in 1179, he and Earl William de Mandeville escorted King Philip Augustus to visit the tomb of newly canonized Archbishop Thomas Becket in Canterbury, and attended the election of Otto IV, as Holy Roman Emperor. King Henry had promised Baldwin marriage to a certain rich heiress, but King Richard had chosen to give that heiress in marriage to another. Now Richard fulfilled his father's promise with an even wealthier heiress, but their enjoyment of her Aumale lands in Normandy was short-lived. King Philip Augustus took Aumale in August 1196 and it remained in the hands of the French king thereafter. Baldwin died in October 1212.

== Later life ==
When King John proposed a fourth husband, Hawise declined. She paid 5,000 marks for her inheritance, her dower lands, and "that she be not distrained to marry". By September 1213 she had paid £1,000 of that fine.
