= William de Forz, 3rd Earl of Albemarle =

Anglo-Norman noble (c. 1190–1242)

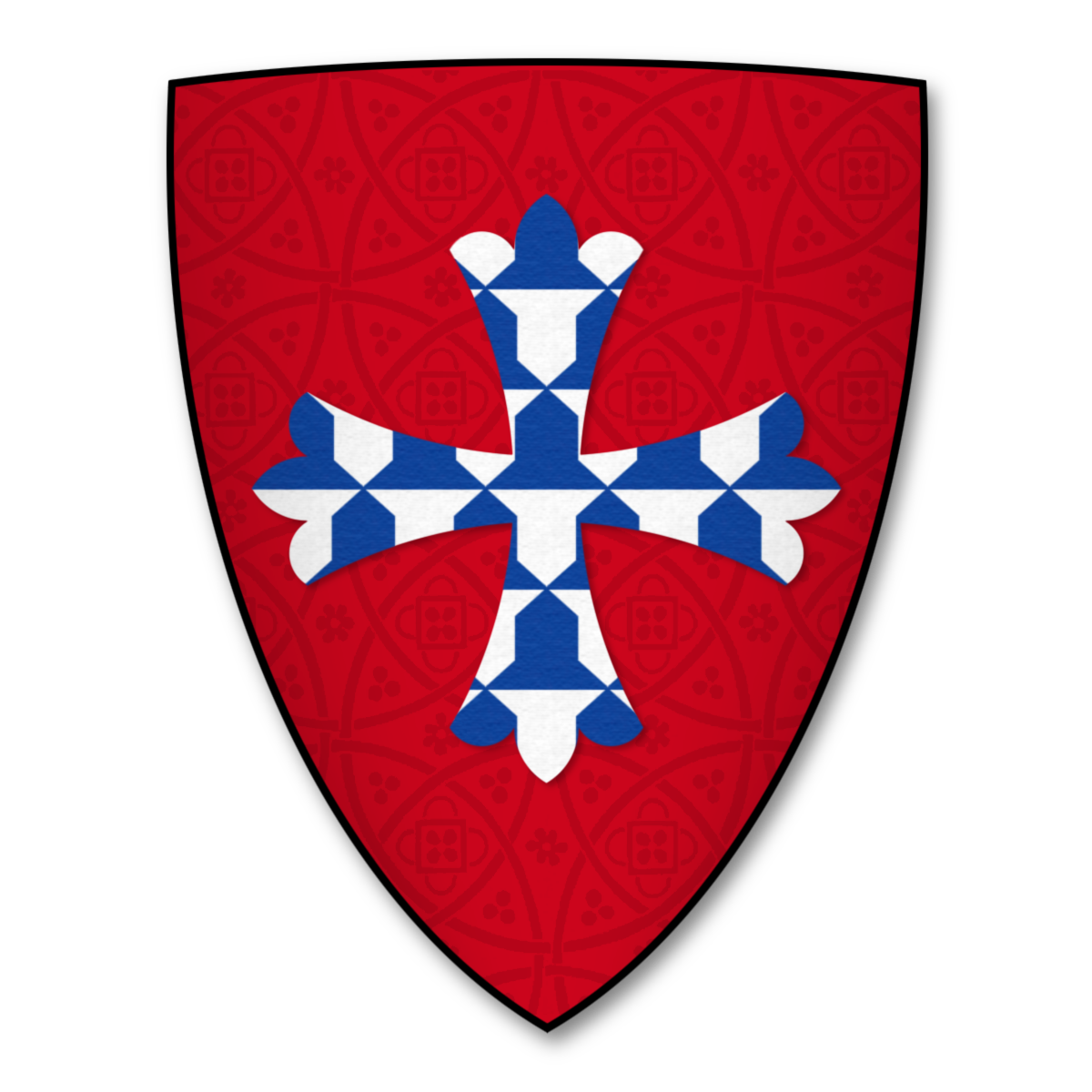
Arms of William de Fortibus, Earl of Albemarle

William II de Forz, 3rd Earl of Albemarle (c. 1190 − 26 March 1242) was an English nobleman. He is described by William Stubbs as "a feudal adventurer of the worst type".

== Family background ==
Forz was the son of William I de Forz (died 1195), and Hawise, Countess of Aumale (died 11 March 1214), a daughter of William le Gros, 1st Earl of Albemarle. His father was a minor nobleman from the village of Fors in Poitou; the toponymic is variously rendered as Fors and Forz, or else Latinised to Fortibus.

== Estate holdings ==
Soon after 1213, Albemarle was established by King John in the territories of the Earldom of Albemarle, and in 1215 the whole of his mother's estates were formally confirmed to him. The Earldom of Albemarle which he inherited from his mother, included a large estate in Yorkshire, notably the wapentake of Holderness, including the castle of Skipsea, and the honour of Craven, as well as estates in Lincolnshire and elsewhere. It had also included the county of Aumale, but this had recently been lost to the French, along with the rest of Normandy. Albemarle was the first holder of his earldom to see it as wholly English.

== Involvement in military actions ==
Albemarle was actively engaged in the struggles of the Norman barons against both King John and King Henry III. He was generally loyal to King John during the baronial revolt, although he did eventually join the barons after the leaders of the City of London joined them and the king's cause looked hopeless.

Albemarle was one of the twenty-five executors of Magna Carta, but among them he was probably the least hostile to the king. The barons made him constable of Scarborough Castle, but when soon after fighting began between the barons and the king, he went over to John's side, the only executor to do so. He fought for the king until the French capture of Winchester in June 1216, when again the king's cause looked hopeless. He then stayed on the barons' side until their cause fell apart. He sided with John, then subsequently changed sides as often as it suited his policy.

After John's death, Albemarle supported the new king, Henry III, fighting in the siege of Mountsorrel and at the Battle of Lincoln.

His real object was to revive the independent power of the feudal barons, and he co-operated to this end with Falkes de Breauté and other foreign adventurers established in the country by John. This brought him into conflict with the great justiciar, Hubert de Burgh, who was effectively regent. In 1219 he was declared a rebel and excommunicated for sponsoring a forbidden tournament in Brackley. In 1220 matters were brought to a crisis by his refusal to surrender the two royal castles of Rockingham and Sauvey of which he had been made constable in 1216. Henry III marched against them in person, the garrisons fled, and they fell without a blow. In the following year, however, Albemarle, in face of further efforts to reduce his power, rose in revolt.

== Excommunication and loss of power ==
Albemarle was now again excommunicated by the legate Pandulf Verraccio at a solemn council held in St Paul's, and the whole force of the kingdom was set in motion against him, a special scutage—the scutagium de Bihan—being voted for this purpose by the Great Council. The capture of his Castle of Bytham broke his power; he sought sanctuary and, at Pandulph's intercession, was pardoned on condition of going for six years to the Holy Land. He remained in England, however, and in 1223 was once more in revolt with Falkes de Breauté and other turbulent spirits. A reconciliation was again patched up; but it was not until the fall of Falkes de Breauté that Albemarle finally settled down as an English noble.

He eventually gave in when the cause was lost in 1224, and was thenceforth loyal to Henry III.

== Revived influence ==
In 1225 Albemarle witnessed Henry's third re-issue of the Great Charter; in 1227 he went as English ambassador to Antwerp; and in 1230 he accompanied Henry on his expedition to Brittany. In 1241 he set out for the Holy Land, but died at sea, on his way there, on 26 March 1242.

== Family ==
By his wife Aveline de Montfichet (Modern English: Avelina), a sister of Richard de Montfichet's, William left a son, William de Forz, 4th Earl of Albemarle, who succeeded him in the Earldom.

== Sources ==
- Turner, Ralph V. (1971). "William de Forz, Count of Aumale: An early thirteenth-century English baron". Proceedings of the American Philosophical Society. 115 (3 (17 June)): 221–249.
- Bibonne, Joël (1938). "Histoire de la famille de Vivonne" (Tome 1), ACVB (2018), 479 pages. ISBN 978-2-9563209-0-6

Peerage of England
Preceded by William de Forz jure uxoris	Earl of Albemarle; 1214–1241	Succeeded by William de Forz
