= William de Forz, 4th Earl of Albemarle =

English nobleman (died 1260)

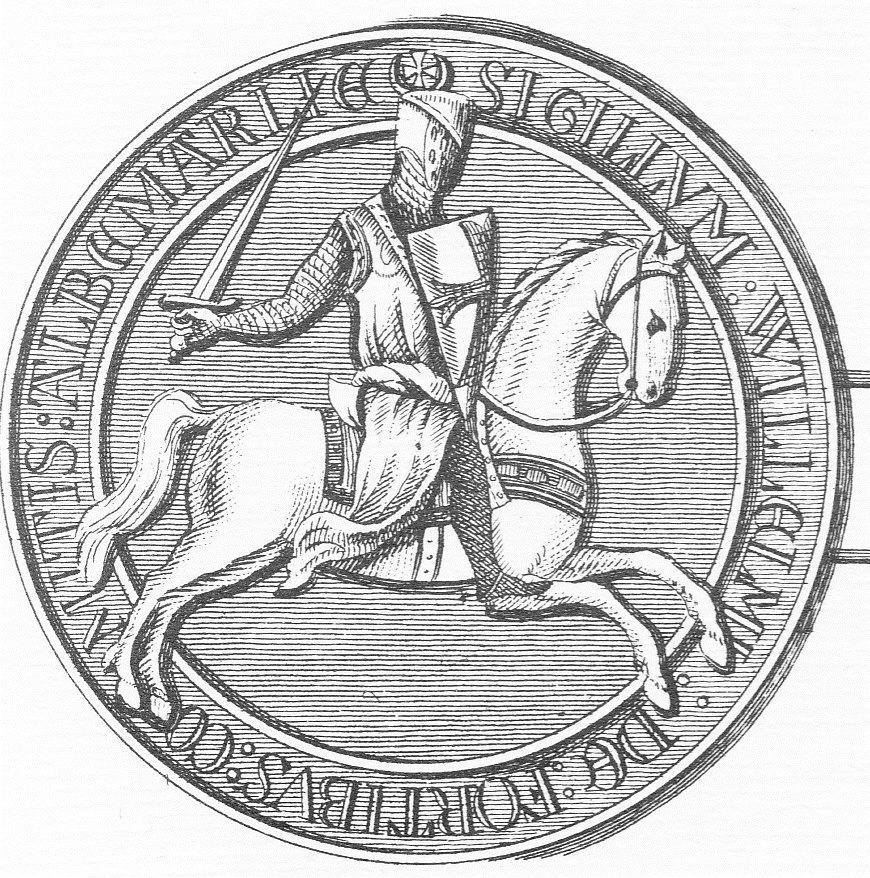
Seal (reverse) of William de Forz. Legend: "SIGILLUM WILLELMI DE FORTIBUS COMITIS ALBEMARLIE" (Seal of William de Forz, Count/Earl of Albemarle). On his shield are shown his arms: Gules a cross patonce vair

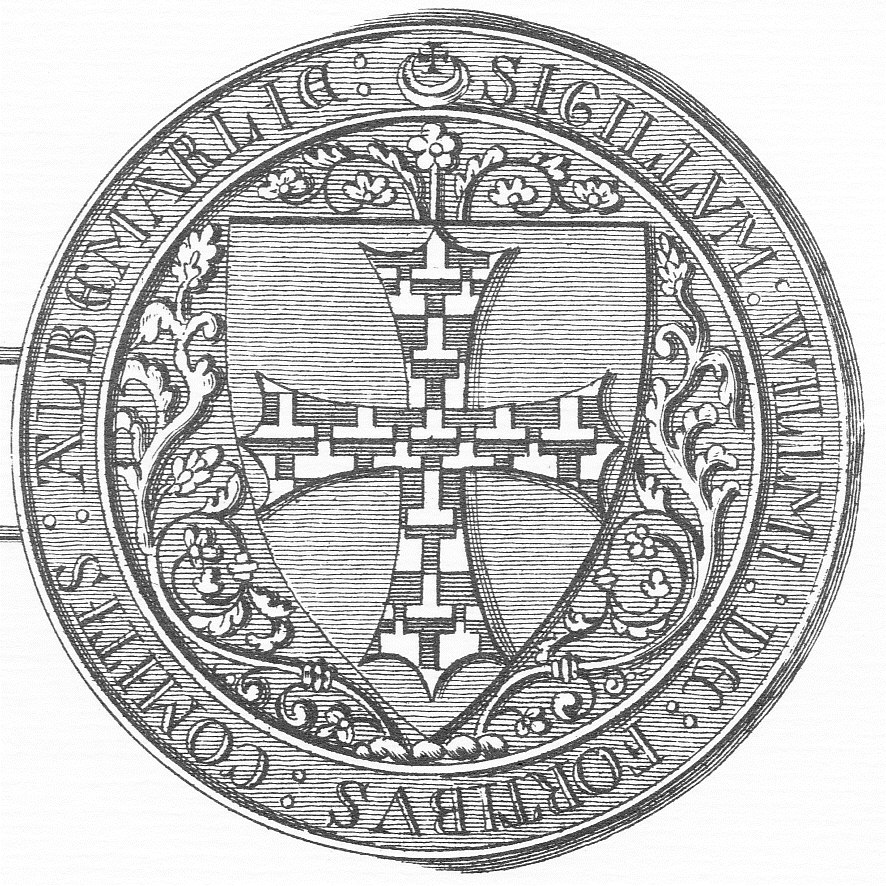
Seal (obverse) of William de Forz. Legend: "SIGILLUM WILLELMI DE FORTIBUS COMITIS ALBEMARLIE" (Seal of William de Forz, Count/Earl of Albemarle). Arms: Gules a cross patonce vair

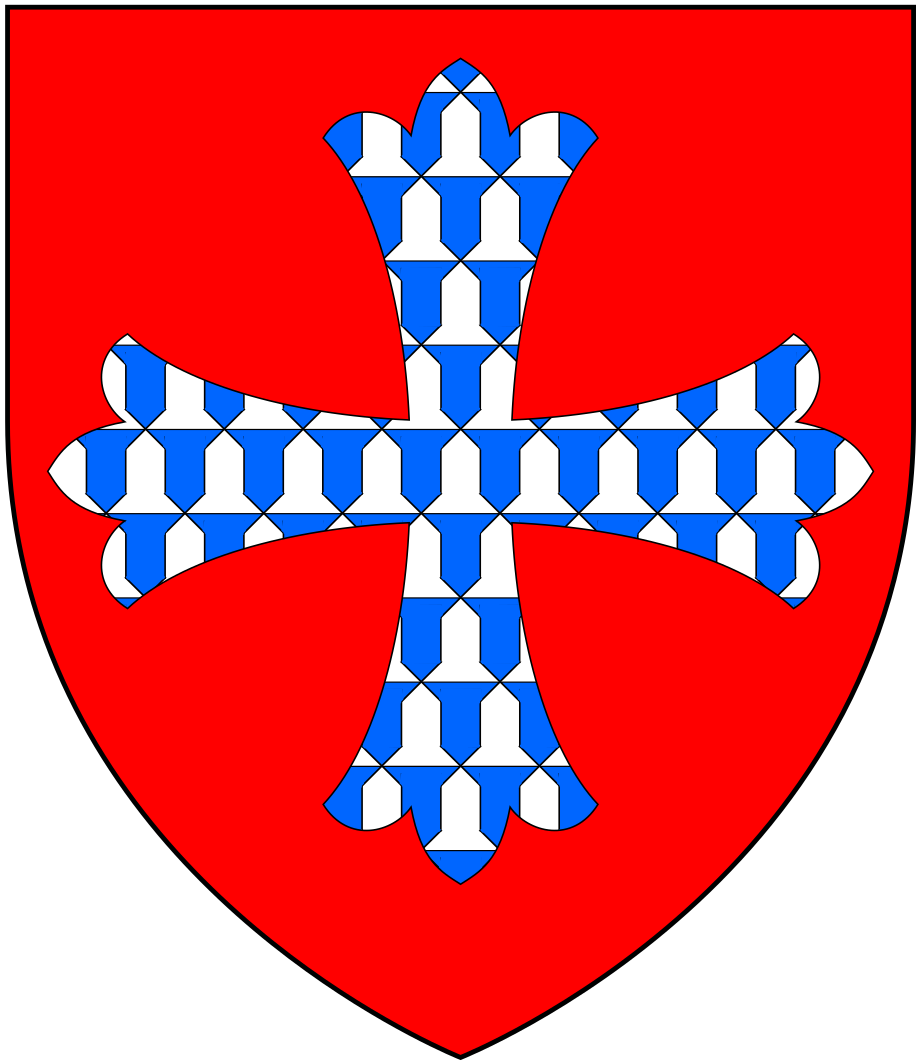
Arms of de Forz: Gules, a cross patonce vair

William III de Forz, 4th Earl of Albemarle or Aumale (died 1260) played a conspicuous part in the reign of Henry III of England, notably in the Mad Parliament of 1258.

William III married twice. His first wife was Christina (died 1246), daughter and co-heiress of Alan, Lord of Galloway. Her mother was one of the co-heiresses of the Earldom of Chester on the death of the last Earl in 1237. He claimed that, as a Palatine, it could not be divided, and his wife should get it as the oldest co-heir. He got the title, but the court decided that the lands should be divided, but this wife died in 1239 without issue. However, he and his wife quitclaimed the earldom to Henry III in 1241 in exchange for modest lands elsewhere.

In 1241, on the death of his father, William II de Forz, 3rd Earl of Albemarle, he inherited his lands, including honours associated with Cockermouth Castle in Cumberland, and Skipton Castle in Craven, Skipsea Castle in Holderness, both in Yorkshire. He joined Henry III in campaigns in Poitou and Wales in 1242 and 1245, but not in Wales in 1257 because he was ill. He held local offices in Cumberland, including justice of the forest for Cumberland in 1251, and sheriff of Cumberland in 1255 and keeper of Carlisle Castle, an office he held until his death.

Two years after the death of his first wife, he remarried in 1248 to Isabella de Redvers (1237–1293), daughter of Baldwin de Redvers, 6th Earl of Devon and Lord of the Isle of Wight.

William III de Forz died at Amiens in 1260. His widow Isabella, on the death of her brother Baldwin de Redvers, 7th Earl of Devon in 1262, inherited his lands and called herself Countess of Devon and Aumale. She had six children, all of whom pre-deceased her, including Thomas who died unmarried in 1269, and Avelina who married Edmund Crouchback, 1st Earl of Lancaster in 1269, but died childless in 1274 aged 15.

Peerage of England
Preceded by William de Forz	Earl of Albemarle; 1241–1260	Succeeded by Thomas
