= William de Forz (died 1195) =

French noble (died 1195)

William I de Forz (died 1195) was a French noble, believed to be from Fors in Poitou. He became by right of his wife Count of Aumale following his marriage to Hawise of Aumale, sole heiress of William le Gros, Count of Aumale, and their son was William II de Forz.

After his death, the French king Philip Augustus took control of Aumale, thus depriving Hawise of her continental land-holdings, but she continued to call herself countess of Aumale and her son after her death used the title of count.
