= Hilduin =

Hilduin (or Hildwin, Hilduinus, etc.) may refer to:

- Hilduin (bishop of Verdun) (died 847)
- Hilduin (archbishop of Cologne) (died 849)
- Hilduin of Saint-Denis (died 855/9), abbot, archchaplain and bishop
- Hilduin of Saint-Martin (died 860), abbot
- Hilduin of Saint-Germain-des-Prés (fl. 854–867), abbot, archchaplain and bishop
- Hilduin (bishop of Évreux) (died 870)
- Hilduin of Saint-Bertin (died 877), abbot
- Hilduin (archbishop of Milan) (died 936), also bishop of Liège and Verona
- Hilduin I, Count of Montdidier (died before 956)
- Hilduin II, Count of Arcis-sur-Aube (died after 993)
- Hilduin (bishop of Limoges) (r. 990–1012)
- Hilduin III, Count of Montdidier (died after 1032)
- Hilduin of Joinville (died 1055), lord of Nully
- Hilduin IV, Count of Montdidier (died 1063)
- Hilduin of Vendeuvre (died 1203), bishop of Langres

== See also ==
- Alduin (disambiguation)
- Gilduin (disambiguation)
