= Gerberga =

Gerberga or Gerberge was the name of several queens and noblewomen among the Franks.

- Gerberga, the wife and Queen consort of Carloman I, King of the Franks (751 – 791)
- Gerberge (born circa 854), daughter of Pepin, Count of Vermandois
- Geva, wife of Dirk I, Count of Holland (born c.870), name also given as Gerberga
- Gerberga, wife of Fulk II, Count of Anjou (c. 905 – 960)
- Gerberga of Saxony (c. 913 – 984), the wife and Queen consort of Louis IV of France, mother of Gerberga of Lorraine
- Gerberge of Lorraine (c. 935 – 978), daughter of Gerberga of Saxony, wife of Adalbert I, Count of Vermandois
- Gerberga (c. 947 – 986/91), mother of Count Otto-William, wife of King Adalbert of Italy and of Henry I, Duke of Burgundy
- Gerberga of Burgundy (965 – 1016), wife of Herman II, Duke of Swabia
- Gerberge, daughter of Rotbold II, Count of Provence (d.1008)
- Gerberga of Lower Lorraine (c.980 – 1018), daughter of Charles, Duke of Lower Lorraine, granddaughter of Gerberga of Saxony, niece of Gerberga of Lorraine, wife of Lambert I, Count of Louvain.
- Ermesinda of Bigorre (1015 – 1049) born Gerberga.
- Gerberga, Countess of Provence (c. 1060 – 1115), succeeded by her daughter Douce of Provence (Dolça de Gévaudaun) and son-in-law Ramon Berenguer III, Count of Barcelona.
- Gerberga II, Abbess of Gandersheim (c. 940 – 1001), daughter of Henry I of Bavaria and Judith of Bavaria
