= Alberic II of Dammartin =

Count of Dammartin (died 1183)

Alberic II (died 1183) was the Count of Dammartin, possibly the son of Aubry de Mello, Count of Dammartin, and Adela, daughter of Hugh I, Count of Dammartin.

What little is known for sure about Alberic II is confounded by the preponderance of noblemen of the same name in both France and England. What is known is that he married Clémence of Bar, daughter of Reginald I "One-Eyed", Count of Bar, one of the leaders of the Second Crusade, and Gisèle de Vaudémont, daughter of Gerard I, Count of Vaudémont.

Alberic and Clémence had one son:

- Alberic III, Count of Dammartin.

Alberic II was succeeded by his son Alberic III as Count of Dammartin upon his death.

The discussion in Aubry, Count of Dammartin, provides some insight into how Alberic III came to claim the countship. Further complicating the genealogy, Clémence, widowed, married Renaud II, Count of Clermont-en-Beauvaisis, her second husband and his second wife. Renaud and his first wife, Adelaide, Countess of Vermandois, were the parents of Mathilde, wife of Alberic III.

He, or his father may have been Grand Chamberman of France.

== Sources ==
- Mathieu, J. N., Recherches sur les premiers Comtes de Dammartin, Mémoires publiés par la Fédération des sociétés historiques et archéologiques de Paris et de l'Ile-de-France, 1996
