= Gilbert of Roucy =

Gilbert
- Count of Roucy
- Reign: 967-c.1000
- Predecessor: Renaud
- Successor: Ebles I
- Died: c.1000
- Burial: Abbey of Saint-Remi
- Father: Renaud of Roucy
- Mother: Alberade of Lorraine

Gilbert (also Giselbert or Gislebert), Count of Reims & Roucy, was the son of Renaud, Count of Reims and Alberade of Lorraine, daughter of Gilbert, Duke of Lorraine. Although his wife's name is unknown, she was likely from the family of the Poitiers. He was Count of Roucy from 967 until his death, and Viscount of Reims.

He was probably still a child when his father died. He inherited the County of Roucy from his father, but the County of Reims was entrusted to Herbert "le Vieux" III of Osmois. Later, Eudes I, Count of Blois, and the successor to Herbert le Vieux, entrusted Giselbert with the Viscouncy of Reims.

In 987, upon the death of King Louis V, Giselbert rallied without difficulty to his successor Hugh Capet, but nevertheless agreed to take an oath of allegiance in 990 to Charles of Lorraine, when the latter pressed his claims to the throne.

He died on April 19 between 991 and 1000, perhaps in 997, and was buried in the abbey of Saint-Remi of Reims.

No contemporary document mentions a wife or children for Giselbert. His successor was Ebles I Count of Roucy. It was long thought Ebles I was the son of Giselbert and, to explain the appearance of the Ebles name in the house of Roucy, a daughter of the Duke of Aquitaine, William III "Towhead", from the house of Poitiers.

According to this hypothesis, and knowing the names of the brothers and sister of Ebles I, Giselbert and this princess of Aquitaine would be the parents of:

1. Ebles I of Roucy († May 11, 1033 ), Count of Roucy and Archbishop of Rheims ( 1021 -1033).
2. Eudes (Odo) Roucy, called "the Strong" († August 27 after 1021), lord of Rumigny.
3. Liétaud (also Letard or Letald) de Roucy, Lord of Marle. Liétaud's daughter Adèle de Marle married first Aubry, Viscount of Coucy, and second the scandalous Crusader Enguerrand I, Lord of Coucy, with whom they had issue.
4. Yvette (possibly either Judith or Doda) de Roucy who married Manasses II or Manasses III of Rethel.

However, a recent study by Jean-Noël Mathieu, based on onomastic data (the first names of Eudes and Lietaud are unexplained by the conventional theory) and patrimony (the lands of Rumigny and Marle, previously owned by the Counts of Blois) proposed a new explanation: that Ebles I of Roucy was the son of Ebles I of Poitiers, (himself the son of William IV of Poitiers and Emma de Blois) and a daughter of Aubry II, Count of Macon, and Ermentrude of Roucy, Giselbert of Roucy's sister. This novel theory is better described on the article about Ebles I.
