= Alberic =

Alberic (French: Albéric; German: Alberich; Dutch: Alberik, Latin: Albericus) is a learned form of the name Aubrey.

Notable people with the name include:

== People with the mononym ==
- Alberic of Cîteaux (died 1109), one of the founders of the Cistercian Order
- Alberic I, Count of Dammartin (died after 1162)
- Alberic II, Count of Dammartin (died 1183)
- Alberic III, Count of Dammartin (died 1200)
- Alberic, Count of Hainaut (died c. 694)
- Alberic of Humbert, archbishop of Reims 1207–1218
- Alberic of London, a possible Third Vatican Mythographer
- Alberic of Monte Cassino (died 1088), Cardinal in the Roman Catholic Church
- Alberic of Ostia (1080–1148), Benedictine monk and Cardinal Bishop of Ostia
- Alberic I of Spoleto (died c. 925), Duke of Spoleto
- Alberic II of Spoleto (912–954), ruler of Rome 932–954
- Alberic of Trois-Fontaines (died c. 1252), monk and Cistercian chronicler
- Alberic III, Count of Tusculum (died 1044)
- Albericus de Rosate (c. 1290–1354 or 1360), an Italian jurist
- Alberic[us] de Ver or Aubrey de Vere II (c. 1085–1141), master chamberlain of England
- Alberik I van Utrecht, Saint Alberic of Utrecht (died 784), Benedictine monk and bishop of Utrecht
- Alberik II, bishop of Utrecht from 838 to 844

== People with the given name ==
- Albéric Bourgeois (1876–1962), French-Canadian cartoonist
- Albéric Clément (c. 1165–1191), first Marshal of France
- Albéric Collin (1886–1962), Belgian sculptor
- Alberic Crescitelli (1863–1900), Catholic priest and martyr
- Alberico Gentili (1552–1608), Italian lawyer
- Albéric Magnard (1865–1914), French composer
- Albéric de Montgolfier (born 1964), French politician
- Albéric O'Kelly de Galway (1911–1980), Belgian chess champion
- Albéric Pont (1870–1960), French dentist
- Alberic Schotte (1919–2004), Belgian cyclist, twice World Road Race Champion (1948, 1950)
- Albéric Second (1817–1887), French writer
- Alberich Zwyssig (1808–1854), Cistercian monk who composed the Swiss national anthem
- Alberik de Suremain (born 1950), Guatemalan rower

== See also ==
- Alberich (disambiguation)
- Aubrey (disambiguation)
- Rosa 'Albéric Barbier', a popular rambling rose cultivar
- Canon Alberic's Scrap-Book, an 1894 ghost story by M. R. James
