= House of Montdidier =

Coat of arms of Montdidier family

The House of Montdidier was a medieval French noble house which ruled as count of Montdidier, Dammartin and Roucy. Its earliest definite member of the family was a certain Hilduin, who died before 956 and was known as comte de Montdidier.

== History ==
The oldest known member of the family of some Montdidier is a Hilduin who died before 956 and was Count Montdidier. A close relative, also named Hilduin, perhaps his son, married Hersende, Lady of Ramerupt and Arcis-sur-Aube.

Assumptions were exposed to clarify and complete the origin of the family, but proved unfounded or not usable. Thus:

The Manasses name, carried by a son and grandson of Hilduin and Hersende returns home from Rethel, but the relationship between the two families is not known more precisely. There is also the tenth century Manasses, father of Gilbert, count of Chalon.

Count Luçay in his book Le comté de Clermont en Beauvaisis, étude pour servir à son histoire (1878), stated that the second Manasses was probably a bastard son of a William Count of Ponthieu, but whose existence is not certain. In any case, this would have been the Count William's maternal grandfather Manasses.

== First generations ==
Hilduin Montdidier and Hersende, Lady of Ramerupt and Arcis-sur-Aube had three sons:

1. Manasses († 991), who became bishop of Troyes
2. Hugh I, Count of Ponthieu (ca. 970 – ca. 1000). He married ca. 994 Gisèle Capet and left two sons:
  1. Enguerrand I, who became Count of Ponthieu
  2. Guy of Ponthieu
3. Hilduin II, who became lord of Ramerupt. Hilduin II made a pilgrimage to Jerusalem in 992 and left two sons:
  1. Hilduin III, Count of Montdidier and Lord of Ramerupt, the elder branch
  2. Calvus Manasses, founder of the younger branch, which became the House of Dammartin.

Hilduin III (died after 1031), had four sons:

1. Hilduin IV († 1063), Lord of Ramerupt and Count of Roucy by his marriage with Alix de Roucy
2. Guillaume
3. Manasses, Viscount de Reims in 1053, married to Béatrice de Hainaut, ex-wife of Count Ebles I of Roucy. (Béatrice and
  Ebles were the parents of Alix de Roucy, wife of Manasses' brother Hildouin IV). He himself had three children:
  1. Manasses who was Archbishop of Reims,
  2. Guy
  3. Adele, abbess of Our Lady of Laon.
  4. Hilduin V had several children and two of them were at the founders
    of branches.

== House de Roucy ==
Hildouin IV of Montdidier († 1063), who married in 1031 Alix de Roucy († 1062), increased the status of his lineage within the local nobility. Indeed, his new wife was descended through her mother from the counts of Hainaut and Capetian kings. Consanguinity between the parents of Alix led to the annulment of their marriage. Alix's father, Ebles I Count de Roucy had entered the orders and became Archbishop of Reims. Alix's mother would later remarry to a brother Hildouin. Hildouin and Alix gave birth to two sons:

1. Ebles II, who inherited Roucy,
2. Andrew, who had Ramerupt and is the founder of the younger branch, and many daughters, married into the local nobility; except Beatrice, wife of Count Geoffroy II du Perche and Felicie, daughter of Ebles II married King Sancho Ramírez I of Aragon.

Ebles Roucy II († 1103) was frustrated in his struggle for increasing his domain. Indeed, in 1063, he led an army into Spain and took part in the crusade of Barbastro. After taking the city, he still fought in Spain and helped the king of Aragon Sancho Ramírez to conquer the throne of Navarre. On this occasion, his sister Felicia married King. Then again he faced the Moors. He had taken part in the affairs of Spain in the hope of receiving an important stronghold, but could not get it, all these having been filled. He then went to Italy lend a hand to Robert Guiscard, prince of Salerno, but history repeated itself: he won the prestigious family alliances, since married the daughter of Robert Guiscard, but had no important fiefdom. Probably tired of these distant adventures or maybe just mellowed by age, he did not participate in the first crusade launched by Pope Urban II in 1095, just as his son did not. He took advantage of the absence of his neighbors by seeking to expand his domain to Champagne. Unable to tolerate his looting, the Archbishop of Rheims called for help the king, who sent his son and heir Prince Louis to restore order. After a short siege, Prince Louis was able to defeat Ebles II in 1102.

He was succeeded by his son Hugues Cholet († 1160) who founded several religious institutions and married Richilde Hohenstaufen, niece of Emperor Henry V and sister of the future Conrad III.

Hugues Cholet's son Guiscard went to lend strength but left the Crusaders in 1170. He died in 1180, and was followed by his eldest son Raoul in 1196, and then his younger son Jean, marking the extinction of the elder branch of the family.

== Cadet branch de Ramerupt ==
Count Hilduin IV of Montdidier and Alix de Roucy married and produced six children:

1. André Count Ramerupt, born about 1040, died about 1118.
2. Hugues Ramerupt
3. Olivier Ramerupt
4. Ebles Ramerupt
5. Alix Ramerupt, married to Count I of Brienne Erard, who died around 1125, son of Count I. Gauthier de Brienne, and Eustachie de Tonnerre.
6. ......(first name unknown) Ramerupt, whose first husband Jean Viscount of Mareuil-sur-Ay (about 1095-around 1127), Viscount of Mareuil, Lord of Montmort, son of Dudo Viscount of Mareuil-sur-Ay and Lady Adelaide of Chalons Vidame. Her second husband in 1151 was Guy Lord of Bazoches, son of the Lord Hugues de Bazoches and Basilie.
