= Hugh of Chalon (bishop of Auxerre) =

Hugh of Chalon (French: Hugues de Chalon; c. 975 – 4 November 1039) was the Count of Chalon and Bishop of Auxerre.

== Life ==
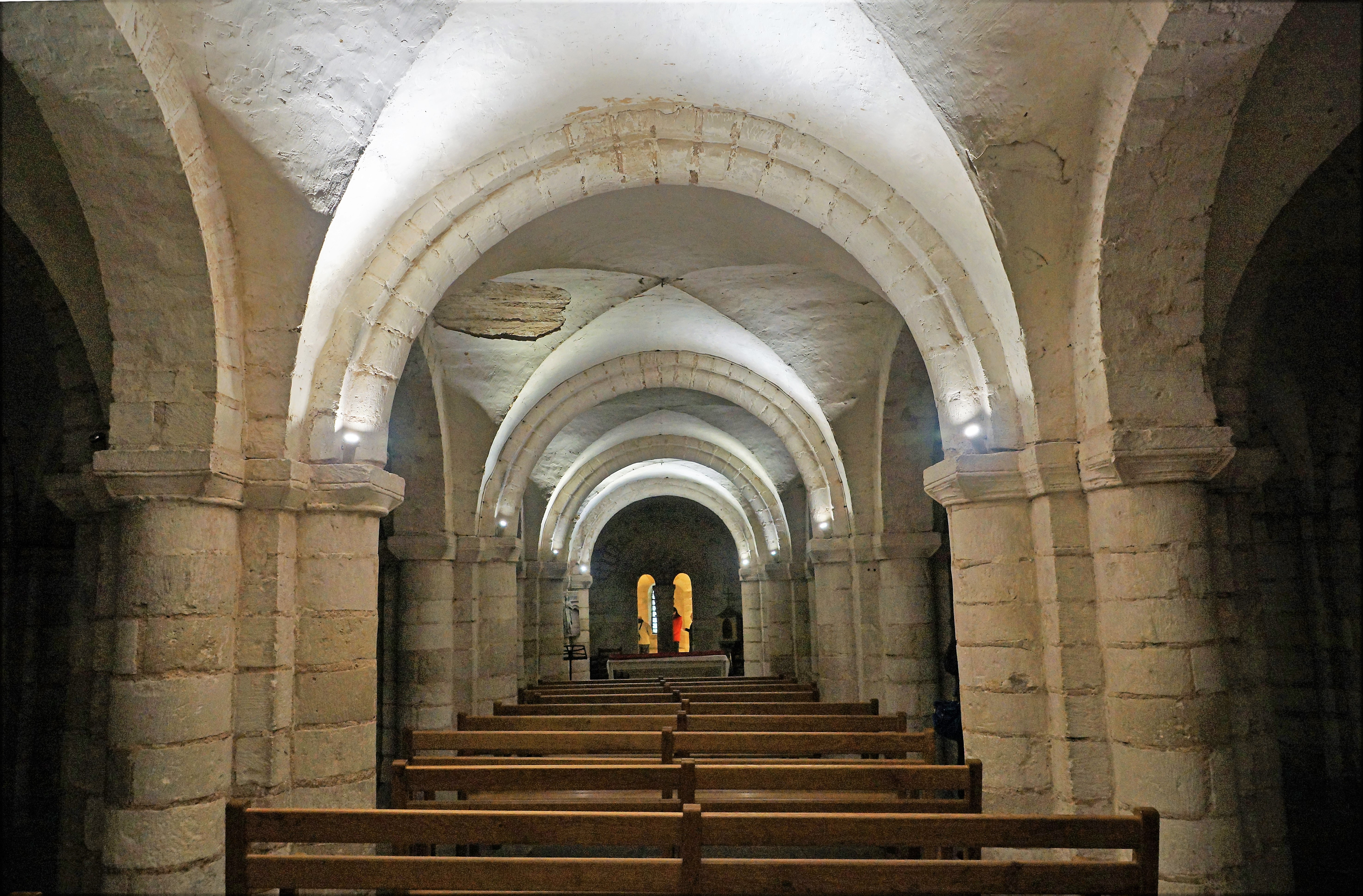
Auxerre Crypte

Hugh was the only son of Lambert of Chalon and his wife Adela (Adelais, Adelaide), and was made a canon of the Cathédrale Saint-Nazaire in Autun.

Upon the death of his father in 978, Hugh became Count of Chalon. Hugh's sister or rather half-sister Gerberga was married to Henry I, Duke of Burgundy. In 999, at the request of Duke Henry, Hugh was named Bishop of Auxerre.

The Benedictine house at Paray-le-Monial had been founded in 973 by Hugh's parents. By 999 it was in need of reform, and Count Hugh gave it to Cluny as a priory.

The large crypt of the Cathédrale Saint-Étienne d'Auxerre was built between 1023 and 1030, when he rebuilt the earlier Romanesque structure. The crypt was immense, with three naves and six traverses. It also featured a new architectural element, a disambulatory, a passage which permitted pilgrims to circulate and visit the tombs in the crypt without disturbing the religious services attended by the clergy.

Some time between 1023 and 1036, the bishop made a pilgrimage to Jerusalem.

His successor was his sororal nephew, Count Theobald of Chalon, son of Hugh's sister Matilda (French: Mathilde).

== Sources ==
- Bouchard, Constance Brittain (1987). Sword, Miter, and Cloister: Nobility and the Church in Burgundy, 980-1198. Cornell University Press.
