= Odo of Dammartin =

Count of Dammartin

Odo (Eudes) (d. after 1061), Count of Dammartin, son of Manasses, Count of Dammartin, and Constance of France. Odo's maternal grandfather was Robert the Pious, King of France, and his paternal great-grandfather was Hilduin I, Count of Montdidier.

Philip I, King of France, donated the village of Bagneux to the Abbey of Saint-Germain-des-Prés in exchange for Combs by charter dated 1061, which recounts that Hugh the Great had granted Comb-la-Villes to Hilduino…comiti de Monte qui vocatur Desiderius, who died before his benefactor (i.e., before 956), and that Henry I, King of France, had regranted Combs to Manasses nepos supradicti Hilduini comitis [Manasses, grandson of Hilduin] just as suus avunculus Hilduinus [his uncle Hilduin] had held it, noting that Odo comes filius prefati Manassetis [Odo, son of Manasses] now claimed the property.

It is not known if Odo married or had issue. Upon his death, Odo was succeeded as Count of Dammartin by his brother Hugh.

== Sources ==
- Mathieu, J. N., Recherches sur les premiers Comtes de Dammartin, Mémoires publiés par la Fédération des sociétés historiques et archéologiques de Paris et de l'Ile-de-France, 1996
