= Renaud of Roucy =

Viking Count of Roucy (c. 920–967)

- Count of Roucy
- Reign: c. 950 – 967
- Successor: Gilbert
- Born: c. 920
- Died: 10 May 967
- Burial: Abbey of Saint-Remi
- Spouse: Alberade of Lorraine
- Issue: Ermentrude; Gilbert; Unknown daughter; Brunon

Renaud or Ragenold, Count of Roucy (c. 920 – 10 May 967) was a 10th-century Viking who swore allegiance to the Kings of West Francia, and became the military chief of Reims after the restoration of the Archbishop Artald of Reims, upon taking the area back from Hugh of Vermandois.

He built a fort at Roucy between the late 940s and early 950s and supported young King Lothair of France in the expedition at Aquitaine and the Siege of Poitiers, during the dynastic struggles of the Kingdom of West Francia. Renaud was made the Count of Roucy around or before 955 by King Lothair.

Renaud married Alberade of Lorraine, daughter of Gilbert, Duke of Lorraine around 945 and had four children:

- Ermentrude (married, firstly, to Aubry II of Mâcon; secondly, to Otto-William, Count of Burgundy)
- Giselbert (Gilbert of Roucy) who succeeded his father as Count of Roucy in May 967.
- Unknown daughter who may have married to Fromond II of Sens
- Brunon de Roucy, the Bishop of Langres.

Renaud could have had a brother named Dodo according to Flodoard. Their parents are not known or recorded.

Renaud died on 10 May 967 and was buried at the Abbey of Saint-Remi.

== Sources ==
- Guenée, Bernard (1978). "Les généalogies entre l'histoire et la politique: la fierté d'être Capétien, en France, au Moyen Age". Annales. Histoire, Sciences Sociales (in French). 33e Année, No. 3 (May - Jun.) (3): 450–477. doi:10.3406/ahess.1978.293943. S2CID 154453506.
