= Lambert of Chalon =

Lambert of Chalon (French: Lambert de Chalon; before 930 - 22 February 978) was the count of Chalon from 956 to 978, and viscount of Autun.

He was the son of Robert of Dijon and Ingeltrude, and the brother to Robert, viscount of Chalon and to Rudolf, viscount of Dijon.

Before 960, he married Adelaide of Vienne, a daughter of count Hugh of Vienne and probably a widow of a Wilhelmid count. Their children included:

- Hugh, count of Chalon and bishop of Auxerre
- Mathilda, married Geoffrey I of Semur.

There is still debate about the precise kinship of Gerberga, who was married to Adalbert of Italy and to Henry I, Duke of Burgundy. In the scenario where she is born from a previous marriage of Adelaide, Lambert would only be her step-father.

Lambert died in 978, was interred at Paray-le-Monial, and was succeeded in Chalon by his son Hugh.

== Sources ==
- Bouchard, Constance Brittain (1987). Sword, Miter, and Cloister:Nobility and Church in Burgundy, 980-1198. Cornell University Press.
- Settipani, Christian (1994). Les origines maternelles du comte Otte-Guillaume. Annales de Bourgogne, 66.
- Bijard, Raphaël. "La construction de la Bourgogne Robertienne (936 - 1031)". Academia.
- Iogna-Prat, Dominique (2002). Order & Exclusion: Cluny and Christendom Face Heresy, Judaism, and Islam. Cornell University Press.
