= Odo of Burgundy =

Eudes, Odo or Otto of Burgundy may refer to:

- Otto, Duke of Burgundy (944–965)
- Odo I, Duke of Burgundy (1060–1102)
- Odo II, Duke of Burgundy (1118–1162)
- Odo III, Duke of Burgundy (1166–1218)
- Odo IV, Duke of Burgundy (1295–1349)
- Odo, Count of Nevers (1230–1266)
- Otto-William, Count of Burgundy (d. 1026)

== See also ==
- Henry I, Duke of Burgundy, born Otto
