= Erard =

Erard may refer to:

- St. Erard or Erhard of Regensburg, bishop of Regensburg in the 7th century
- Erard I, Count of Brienne (1060–1114)
- Sébastien Érard (1752–1831), French instrument maker of German origin who specialised in the production of pianos and harps
- Erard (company), renowned musical instrument maker, mainly of pianos and harps, founded by Sébastien Érard and based in Paris, France
