= Alberich (disambiguation) =

Alberich is the dwarf of German and Old Norse mythology

Alberich may also refer to:

== People ==
- Alberic of Monte Cassino (d. 1088), Roman Catholic Cardinal and author
- Alberich of Reims (c. 1085–1141), Roman Catholic archbishop
- Alberich Mazak (1609–1661), Czech-Austrian composer
- Alberich Rabensteiner (1875–1945), Cistercian monk martyred at Heiligenkreuz Abbey, Austria
- Alberich Zwyssig (1808-1854), Cistercian monk who composed what is now the Swiss national anthem
- Maria Pascual Alberich (1933–2011). Spanish illustrator

== Places ==
- Alberich Glacier, Antarctica

== Fiction and literature ==
- Alberich, character in Der Ring des Nibelungen by Richard Wagner
- Alberich, character in Heralds of Valdemar by Mercedes Lackey
- Alberich, nickname of Silke Haller in the German TV series Tatort Münster.

== Military ==
- Alberich, code name for anechoic tile developed by the Germans for U-Boats in World War II
- Operation Alberich, a German military operation in France during World War I
- Operation Alberich, German secret service operation to uncover the 2007 bomb plot in Germany

== See also ==
- Alberic
- Albrecht (disambiguation)
