= Alberic I =

Alberic I may refer to:

- Alberic I of Utrecht (d. 784), bishop and saint
- Alberic I of Spoleto (d. c. 925), duke
- Alberic I, Count of Dammartin (d. after 1162)
