= Manasses III =

Manasses III may refer to:

- Manasses III, Count of Rethel (died c. 1080)
- Manasses of Seignelay (died 1221), bishop of Orléans as Manasses III

== See also ==
- Manasses I
- Manasses II
