= Henry, Duke of Burgundy =

Henry, Duke of Burgundy may refer to:

- Henry I, Duke of Burgundy (946–1002), called The Great
- Henry II, Duke of Burgundy (1008–1060), also Henry I of France
