= Alberic III =

Alberic III may refer to:

- Alberic III, Count of Tusculum (d. 1044)
- Alberic III, Count of Dammartin (d. 1200)
