= Gerberga, Queen of Italy =

10th-century Queen consort of Italy

Gerberga

Queen consort of Italy
- Tenure: 950–963
- Born: c. 947
- Died: 986/91
- Spouses: Adalbert of Italy; Henry I, Duke of Burgundy
- Issue: Otto-William, Count of Burgundy
- Mother: Adelaide

Gerberga, Otto-William's mother (c. 947 – 986/91), was, by her successive marriages, queen of Italy (c. 958 – 963), margravine of Ivrea (965–970), and duchess of Burgundy (971/5–986/91).

== Ancestry ==
There has been some debate about Gerberga's ancestry. Recent scholars think that Gerberga's parents were Lambert of Chalon and Adelaide. Because Gerberga's son, Otto-William, later succeeded to the county of Mâcon (through marriage to Ermentrude de Roucy, the widow of the previous count), old assumptions had mistakenly argued that Gerberga must have been descended from the counts of Mâcon rather than from Lambert of Chalon or Adelaide. A primary source, the Gesta pontificum of Auxerre confirms that Hugh of Chalon (bishop of Auxerre) is a frater (brother) of Gerberga. Remaining debate is about the meaning of the latter word—half-brother or full brother. The scenario where Adelaide is the common mother may explain that on the death without direct heirs in 1039 of Gerberga's brother Hugh, his county of Chalon which come from Lambert, was inherited by children of his younger sister Mathilde, ignoring the superior claims of Gerberga's own descendants, among whom were the powerful counts of Burgundy. And considering the likely birth date of her son, Gerberga's first marriage must have taken place while her husband and father-in-law were still struggling for the kingdom of Italy against Otto I King of Germany and it is likely that Adalbert's marriage could have brought additional political support. It is not clear how the mere count of Chalon Lambert could have provided this support.

== Marriages ==
Gerberga's first husband was King Adalbert of Italy. They engaged around 956, and later had one child, Otto-William.

After Adalbert's death in 971/5, Gerberga married for a second time, to Henry I, Duke of Burgundy, the younger brother of King Hugh Capet. Gerberga and Henry had no children together. Since Henry had no legitimate son of his own, he adopted his step-son Otto-William making him a possible heir of the Duchy of Burgundy.

== Life after her marriage with Duke Henry ==
Gerberga's interventions with her son are mainly in Nevers, a charter for Nevers Saint-Cyr Church, dated April 986, is subscribed by Henricus Burgundiæ dux, Guillelmus comes, Girberga comitissa. The legitimacy of this new area of arbitration for the duke should come from the rights of Gerberga's mother. Besides, Gerberga's dower is located in the Beaune county. Otto-William become count of this district before 991, and after 1005 he will donate the villa of Veuvey-sur-Ouche, which belonged to his mother, to the Abbey St. Bénigne in Dijon.
