= Anseau =

Anseau is a masculine French given name. Notable holders include:

- Anseau de Cayeux (fl. 1200–1247)
- Anseau of Garlande (1069–1118)
- Anseau de Joinville (1265–1343), marshal of France
- Anseau II de Ronquerolles (fl. 1209)
- Anseau I of Traînel (d. 1146)
- Anseau II of Traînel (d. 1188/9), who married a daughter of Guy of Bar-sur-Seine
- Anseau III of Traînel (fl. 1188–1208), who married a daughter of Erard II, Count of Brienne
- Anseau IV of Traînel (d. 1239)
