= Alberic I of Dammartin =

Count of Dammartin

Alberic (Aubry) de Mello (d. after 1162), Count of Dammartin, based on his marriage to Adela, daughter of Hugh I, Count of Dammartin. It is believed that Aubry was the son of Gilbert de Mello and Richilde de Clermont, daughter of Hugh, Count of Clermont-en-Beauvais, (d. 1101) and Margaret, daughter of Hilduin IV, Count of Roucy.

== Biography ==
The precise history of Aubry de Mello is difficult to trace due to the large number of nobility of the same name in both France and England at the time. It is useful to look at the full history of the Count of Dammartin to try to understand the different options.

Renaud II, Count of Clermont-en-Beauvasis, first married Adelaide, Countess of Vermandois, and second Clémence, the widow of Alberic II, Count of Dammartin. Shortly after the death of Renaud II, Louis VII the Younger, King of France, assumed direct control over the county of Dammartin. This is indicated by a charter dated 1176, under which King Louis VII exchanged property with Paris Hôtel-Dieu and had later returned the castle and grange of Dammartin to Alberic II (postquam vero Alberico predictum castrum cum predicta grangia reddidimus).

The precise circumstances and dating of the king's acquisition of Dammartin are unknown, but it may have been triggered by a disputed succession. Renaud had presumably retained the county for life (jure uxoris), but his sons by Clémence would have had no right to it. The heir to the county appears to have been Adela, widow of Lancelin, Lord of Dammartin. A charter dated 1175 hints that the inheritance of Dammartin was disputed.

The question remains as to why was Alberic was chosen to receive the County of Dammartin. Mathieu suggests that he was the king's candidate and belonged to the Dammartin line in order to prevail over challenges from other claimants. His theory is that Aubry de Mello was the same person as the English Aubry I de Dammartin, son of Odo I de Dammartin who had emigrated to England. He bases this on the charter dated March 1187, under which Henry II of England granted manerium de Norton to comiti Alberico de Dammartin et Reginaldo filio suo, as the same property had been granted to other members of the English Dammartin family by his predecessor Henry Beauclerc. In addition, the sources quoted below indicate that Aubry held other English properties which were previously associated with the English Dammartin family.

Aubrey and Adela had at least one son:

- Alberic II, Count of Dammartin

Aubry may be the same person as Albéric I de Mello and Dammartin, Grand Chambrier de France (Grand Chamberman of France) from 1122 to 1129 under Louis VI the Fat. Others characterize Albéric as Aubry's son (but not the same person as Alberic II, Count of Dammartin).

Aubry was succeeded as Count of Dammartin by his son Alberic.
