= Erard I of Brienne =

Érard I, Count of Brienne (c. 1060–1114) was Count of Brienne at the end of the 11th century. He was the son of Walter I of Brienne, count of Brienne, and his wife Eustachie of Tonnerre (Eustachie de Tonnerre). When Érard inherited the county of Brienne, he was invested by Theobald III, Count of Blois.

Érard co-founded an abbey at Boulancourt, and later founded a monastery at Beaulieu. In 1114, Érard followed his liege lord, Hugh, Count of Champagne, to the Holy Land.

== Marriage and issue ==
In 1110 he married Alix of Roucy-Ramerupt, daughter of André de Montdidier-Roucy, seigneur de Ramerupt and son of Hilduin IV, Count of Montdidier. They had:

- Walter II of Brienne, count of Brienne and lord of Ramerupt. Father of Érard II.
- Guy of Brienne
- Félicité of Brienne (Félicité de Brienne), who married Simon I of Broyes (Simon Ier de Broyes ), then in 1142 Geoffroy III, sire de Joinville (Geoffroy III de Joinville ).

== Sources ==
- Perry, Guy (2013). John of Brienne: King of Jerusalem, Emperor of Constantinople, c.1175–1237. Cambridge University Press.24
- Perry, Guy (2018). The Briennes: The Rise and Fall of a Champenois Dynasty in the Age of the Crusades, c. 950-1356. Cambridge University Press.
