= County of Bar-sur-Seine =

Countship

Map of France in 1180. Bar-sur-Seine is in the south of Champagne in the upper right quadrant.

The county of Bar-sur-Seine was a compact lordship in France during the Middle Ages. Its seat, Bar-sur-Seine, lies on a Gallo-Roman site, but is only attested from the ninth century. It became of strategic importance in the twelfth century, as an urban centre and major castle on the road between Burgundy and Champagne.

The first clear evidence that Bar-sur-Seine was regarded as a county comes from the late eleventh century. The castle belonged to the counts of Tonnerre until it was inherited by Eustachia, daughter of Milo III of Tonnerre. She married Walter I, Count of Brienne, and he took to titling himself "Count of Brienne and Bar-sur-Seine". In 1085, their third son, Milo II, inherited both the castle of Bar and the title of count. It is only at this juncture that a distinct county of Bar-sur-Seine emerges.

Milo II was able to pass on the county undivided to his eldest son, Guy, in 1125 after his second son, Raynaud, entered the church and his third son, Herbert, married the heiress of the lordship of Ville-sur-Arce. Guy likewise passed on an undiminished county to his eldest son, Milo III. He died in 1151 only a year after his marriage to Agnes, heiress of Braine and Baudement. His heir was their only child, the infant Petronilla. Her uncle, Manasses, a cleric, ruled the county in her name until her marriage to Hugh of Le Puiset in 1168. Hugh ruled the county for the next twenty-one years, first in the name of his wife and from 1174 in the name of their son, Milo IV.

Initially, the county, like the castle, was a fief of the Bishop and Duke of Langres. Milo II and his successors entered the orbit of the counts of Champagne in part out of desire to distance themselves from the bishop, their overlord. In the 1170s under Hugh of Le Puiset the county transferred its fealty from the bishop to the count of Champagne. By 1201, under Milo IV, it was considered one of the "great fiefs" of Champagne.

The death of Milo IV and his only son, Gaucher, at the Siege of Damietta in 1219 sealed the county's fate. His widow, Helisent of Joigny, inherited the castle and her dower while the rest of the county went to Milo's nephews and nieces. Unusually, the county of Bar-sur-Seine was reassembled by Count Theobald IV of Champagne. He purchased the shares that went to Milo's relatives in 1223–24 and then those of Helisent and the community property in 1225. In 1227 he reorganized it as a castellany of the county of Champagne.

== List of counts ==
- Milo II (1085–1124)
- Guy (1125–1147)
- Milo III (1147–1151)
- Petronilla (1151–1174)
  - Manasses (1151–1168)
  - Hugh of Le Puiset (1168–1174)
- Milo IV (1174–1219)
  - Hugh of Le Puiset (1174–1189)

== Sources ==
- Coutant, Lucien (1854). Histoire de la ville et de l'ancien comté de Bar-sur-Seine. Librairie Doussot.
- Evergates, Theodore (2007). The Aristocracy in the County of Champagne, 1100–1300. University of Pennsylvania Press.
- Perry, Guy (2018). The Briennes: The Rise and Fall of a Champenois Dynasty in the Age of the Crusades, c.950–1356. Cambridge University Press.
