= Ebles II of Roucy =

Ebles II
- Count of Roucy
- Reign: 1063–1103
- Predecessor: Hilduin IV
- Died: 1103
- Spouse: Sibylla of Hauteville
- Dynasty: House of Montdidier
- Father: Hilduin IV
- Mother: Adelaide de Roucy

Ebles II (died May 1103), also called Eble or Ebale, (Note: This name has been found in Latin as Ebalus, Ebolus, Ebulus or Evulus.) was the second Count of Roucy (1063–1103) of the House of Montdidier. He was the son and successor of Hilduin IV of Montdidier and Alice (Alix), daughter of Ebles I of Roucy. He is famous for his participation in the Reconquista (the war against Muslim Spain), as well as for being one of the unruly barons of the Île-de-France subjugated by King Louis VI while he was still a prince. His life and character are summed up by Suger in his history of the reign of Louis VI: "Ebles was a man of great military prowess—indeed he became so bold that one day he set out for Spain with an army of a size fit only for a king—his feats of arms only made him more outrageous and rapacious in pillage, rape and all over evils."

== Spanish crusade of 1073 ==
On 30 April 1073 Pope Gregory VII authorised a new crusade against the Muslims in Spain. (The Barbastro Crusade of a decade earlier had failed to achieve anything lasting.) In the bull, addressed to "all the princes [rulers] in the land of Spain", Gregory asserted Papal suzerainty over the Iberian peninsula—"we believe the kingdom of Spain to have been from antiquity the rightful property of Saint Peter"—and informed them that he had ceded this right to Ebles of Roucy. (Note: The Latin of Gregory's missive is “omnibus principus in terram Hyspaniae” and “credimus regnum Hyspanie ab antiquo proprii iuris sancti Petri fuisse”. Two letters of Gregory dated the same day survive, one to the Papal legates then in southern France and another to the barons of France wishing to participate in the venture. They can be found in Ephraim Emerton, The Correspondence of Pope Gregory VII: Selected Letters from the Registrum (Columbia, 1990), 4–6.) The negotiations between Ebles and the Holy See had been conducted by Gregory as legate before he became Pope on 22 April, and his letter makes clear there had been prior letters between Ebles and Pope Alexander II. Ebles made a pact (pactio) with the Holy See whereby the lands he conquered in Spain would be held by him as a Papal fiefdom "for the honour of Saint Peter". Four fragments of bulls issued by Alexander granting the plenary indulgence for engaging in a holy war have been customarily dated to the campaign against Barbastro (1063–64) but may belong to that of Ebles.

Ebles was probably a relative of Sancho Ramírez, King of Aragon, both descending from the Dukes of Aquitaine. (Note: Sancho's mother was Gisberga, daughter of Bernard-Roger of Foix, who was probably descended from the dukes on his father's side. Ebles I of Roucy was the illegitimate son of Ebles of Poitiers, a younger son of William IV of Aquitaine, whose paternal grandfather was Ebles Manzer. Ebles II and Sancho are called cousins in Reilly (1988), 80.) On 25 May Sancho Garcés IV, the ruler of Navarre, and his neighbour, Ahmad al-Muqtadir, the ruler of Zaragoza, concluded an alliance by treaty against the planned crusade. For reasons unknown, the crusade never took place, or at least left no record of its accomplishments, which must in any case have been meagre. According to one historian, the crusade may have been frustrated by Gerald of Ostia, Papal legate, Cardinal and Cluniac, as part of the efforts of the Abbey of Cluny to support the Kingdom of León–Castile in its rivalry with the Kingdom of Aragon. The Papacy under Alexander and Gregory supported the king of Aragon, and at least some of Alfonso VI of Castile's actions in 1073 can be seen as a response to the projected crusade. The appointment of Gerald, a former grand prior of Cluny, and the archdeacon Raimbald as legates in Spain may have been intended originally by Alexander II to appease Alfonso VI or his predecessor, Sancho II, by assuring them that their claims on the parias of Zaragoza (which, along with allied Navarre, felt threatened by the crusade) were not in jeopardy. Upon becoming Pope, however, Gregory removed Gerald from this position and instated Hugh Candidus, a veteran of the crusade of Barbastro and a friend of the king of Aragon. (Note: He did allow Gerald to appoint advisors to his replacement, but the change appears to have been pro-Aragonese and hence anti-Castilian, cf. Bishko (1969), 77–78.) In February 1074 Gregory was busy pushing Sancho, a recognised Papal vassal since 1068, to act against the Muslims. Sancho at some point took as his second wife Felicia (Félicie), perhaps the sister of Ebles. (Note: This marriage can be placed anywhere between 1068 (David [1947], 367) and 1075, but it is possible that Felicia was rather the daughter of Ermengol III of Urgell and his first or second wife Clemencia, cf. Bishko (1969), 55 n344.)

== Feudal conflict in France ==
According to Suger, the "tyrannical, valiant and turbulent baron Ebles of Roucy and his son Guischard" (Note: tyrannide fortissimo et tumultuosi baronis Ebali Ruciacensis et filii eius Guischardi) frequently plundered the Archdiocese of Reims ("the noble church of Reims and the churches dependant on it"), and over one hundred formal complaints against Ebles were made to the Crown during the time of Philip I (1060–1108). His son, the future Louis VI, received two or three complaints and gathered an army of seven hundred knights "from the most noble and valiant of French lords" and entered the district of Reims, where he fought Ebles "vigorously" for the next two months, resting his army only on Saturdays and Sundays. (Note: In Suger's words: "punishing the evils inflicted in the past on the churches, and ravaging, burning and pillaging the lands of the tyrant and his associates. It was well done; for the pillagers were pillaged, and the torturers exposed to equal or worse tortures than they had inflicted on others. Such was the ardour of the prince and his army that throughout the whole time they were there they scarcely rested, except on Saturdays and Sundays; they ceaselessly fought with lances or swords, to avenge by harrying the injuries the count had done.") Louis made war on all the barons of the region because they were allied by family ties to Ebles, who he describes as "the great men of Lotharingia". The prince, on the advice of his counsellors, only left the region after Ebles had sworn oaths to respect the peace of the churches and given hostages. Negotiations over the possession of the castle of Neufchâtel were left off for a later date.

When Thomas de Marle came into possession of the powerful fortress of Montaigu by marriage, Ebles joined with Enguerrand de Bova to expel him. While they were attempting to "surround him with a wattled stockade, and force him to capitulate through fear of slow starvation", Thomas escaped to the court of Prince Louis and, having bought off his advisors with gifts, convinced the prince to come to his defence. Ebles, respecting his previous oaths, refused to make war on the prince. After Louis destroyed the blockade of Montaigu, the allies turned on him. The princely army and the army of Ebles and Enguerrand menaced each other with trumpets and spear-rattling (Note: Suger borrows the phrase "spears menaced spears" from Lucan's Pharsalia, I, 7.) across a river for two days before the prince impetuously charged (provoked, Suger, says, by the taunts of an enemy jongleur who entered his camp). Impress by Louis's bravery, the rebels made their peace.

Pope Gregory wrote to Ebles after the deposition of Archbishop Manasses I of Reims in 1081 asking him to resist the latter's claims.

Around 1082 Ebles donated his section of the road at Mortcerf to the abbey of Saint-Martin at Pontoise.

Anna Komnene, in the Alexiad, records the marriage of the youngest daughter of Robert Guiscard to a certain Eubulus, a "very illustrious count". This daughter was Sybilla, the wife of Ebles of Roucy.
