= Gilduin =

Gilduin, Gelduin or Geldwin may refer to:

- Gelduin of Saumur (fl. 1026), father-in-law of Hervé I, Count of Perche
- Gilduin of Joigny (died 1049), archbishop of Sens
- Gilduin of Dol (died 1077), elected archbishop of Dol, saint
- Gelduin of Anchin (died 1123), abbot, correspondent of Anselm of Canterbury and saint
- Gilduin of Le Puiset (died 1130/5), abbot of Saint Mary of the Valley of Jehosaphat
- Gilduin of Saint-Victor (died 1155), abbot of Saint-Victor and confessor of Louis VI of France
- Gelduin I (died 1137), lord of Combourg
- Geldwin, father of Bishop Savaric FitzGeldewin (died 1205)
- Gelduin II (died after 1235), lord of Combourg

== See also ==
- Hilduin (disambiguation)
