= Counts of Dammartin =

The Counts of Dammartin were the rulers of the county of Dammartin, based in the current commune of Dammartin-en-Goële as early as the 10th century. Located at the central plain of France, the county controlled the roads of Paris to Soissons and Laon. It seems that this county was initially held by Constance, the wife of Manasses Calvus, the first Count. The name Dammartin-en-Goële comes from Domnus Martinus, the Latin name of St. Martin of Tours, who evangelized the region of Goële in the fourth century. A small town in the district of Meaux in the Department of Seine-et-Marne, ancient village of Region of Île-de-France, it appears to go back to the earliest times; Dammartin-en-Goële, also called Velly, was in 1031 one of the most significant places in France.

== House of Montdidier ==
- Manasses (before 1031 – 1037), son of Hildouin II de Montdidier, seigneur de Ramerupt, married to Constance, daughter of Robert II of France
- Odo (1037–1060), son of the preceding
- Hugh I (1060–1100), brother of the preceding, married to Roharde of Bulles
- Peter (1100–1105), son of the preceding.

== House of Mello ==

- Alberic I (1105–1112), married to Aelis (Adela) of Dammartin, daughter of Hugh I and of Roharde of Bulles.
- Alberic II (1112–1183), son of the preceding, married to Clemence of Bar
- Alberic III (1183–1200), son of the preceding, married in 1164 to Matilda of Clermont-en-Beauvaisis, daughter of Reginald II, count of Clermont, and Adelaide, countess of Vermandois.
- Reginald I, (1200–1227), also count of Boulogne and Aumale, married to Marie of Châtillon
- Matilda (1214–1259), also countess of Boulogne, Aumale and Mortain, daughter of preceding, married to:
  - Philip Hurepel (1218), count of Clermont-en-Beauvaisis, in 1218
  - Afonso III, king of Portugal (1235).

After dispute between the heirs of Matilda, who died without issue, the county of Dammartin was given to Matthew of Trie, grandson of Alberic III.

== House of Trie ==

- Mathieu de Trie (1262–1272), son of Jean I, seigneur de Trie and of Mouchy, and of Aélis de Dammartin (daughter of Aubry III)
- Jean II de Trie (1272–1302), Count of Dammartin, killed at Courtrai at the Battle of the Golden Spurs on 11 July 1302, son of preceding. Married to

1. Ermengearde
2. Yolande de Dreux (v. 1243 † 1313), daughter of John I, Count of Dreux, and of Marie de Bourbon-Dampierre

- Renaud II de Trie (1302–1319), son of preceding and of Yolande de Dreux. Married to Philippe de Beaumont-en-Gâtinais.
- Renaud III de Trie (1319–1327) son of preceding and of Philippe de Beaumont-en-Gâtinais. Died without issue.
- Jean III de Trie (1327–1338), brother of preceding. Married to Jeanne de Sancerre.
- Charles de Trie (1338–1394), son of preceding. Married to Jeanne d'Amboise.
- Blanche de Trie (1394– ). Daughter of preceding. Married to Charles, seigneur de la Rivière, Grand Master of Waters and Forests of France, died without issue.

== House of Châtillon ==

- Marguerite de Châtillon (died after 1389), daughter of Jacqueline de Trie, sister of Charles de Trie, and Jean de Châtillon, Count of Porcien. Married to Guillaume de Fayel, viscount of Breteuil.

== House of Fayel ==
- Jean de Fayel (died after 1420), viscount of Breteuil, Count of Dammartin, son of Guillaume de Fayel, viscount of Breteuil, and of Marguerite de Châtillon.
- Marie de Fayel (died before 1439), sister of Jean de Fayel. Married to Renaud de Nanteuil.

The English, who occupied the northern half of France, confiscated the County of Dammartin and gave it to a Burgundian lord, Antoine de Vergy.

== House of Vergy ==

- Antoine de Vergy († 1439), son of Jean III de Vergy and of Jeanne de Chalon. He is a descendant of the Counts of Dammartin: Jean III of Vergy is son of John II of Vergy, himself son of Henri de Vergy and Mahaut of Trie, daughter of Jean II de Trie, Count of Dammartin.

== House of Nanteuil ==
Charles VII recovered the county of Dammartin and returned it to the rightful owner.

- Renaud de Nanteuil, husband of Marie de Fayel.
- Marguerite de Nanteuil (died 1475), daughter of Renaud de Nanteuil and Marie de Fayel. Married in 1439 to Antoine de Chabannes.

== House of Chabannes ==
- Antoine de Chabannes (1439–1488)
- Jean de Chabannes (1488–1503), son of the preceding. Married to Suzanne de Bourbon, daughter of Louis de Bourbon, Count of Roussillon, and of Jeanne de Valois
- Antoinette de Chabannes (1503–1527), daughter of the preceding. Married to René of Anjou (1483 † 1521), baron of Mézières, son of Louis of Anjou (illegitimate son of Charles, Count of Maine) and of Louise de la Trémoille.

== House of Anjou-Mézières ==
- Françoise d'Anjou (1527–1547), daughter of Antoinette de Chabannes. Married to Philippe de Boulainvilliers († 1536), Count of Fauquemberghe

== House of Boulainvilliers ==
- Philippe de Boulainvilliers (1547–1554), son of Françoise d'Anjou. His mother gave him the county in 1547, which he sold to Anne de Montmorency in 1554.

== House of Montmorency ==

- Anne de Montmorency (1554–1567), baron then Duke of Montmorency. Married in 1529 to Madeleine de Savoie.
- François de Montmorency (1567–1579), son of the preceding, Duke of Montmorency. Married in 1557 to Diane de France, without issue.
- Henri I de Montmorency (1579–1614), brother of the preceding, Duke of Montmorency. Married :

1. in 1558 to Antoinette de La Marck (1542 † 1591)
2. in 1593 to Louise de Budos (1575 † 1598)

- Henri II de Montmorency (1614–1632), son of the preceding, Duke of Montmorency.

The king confiscated his property and gave Dammartin to the Prince of Condé. The county then lost its importance, and the castle was dismantled.

== House of Bourbon-Condé ==

- Henri II de Bourbon (1632–1646), prince of Condé. Married to Charlotte de Montmorency (1594 † 1650), sister of Henri II de Montmorency

The county is transmitted through his descendants until the Revolution.
