= Milo IV of Le Puiset =

French crusader

Milo IV, also Milon du Puiset (died 18 August 1219), was a French crusader from Champagne. His parents were Hugh IV of Le Puiset and Petronilla, countess of Bar-sur-Seine.

Milo was Seigneur du Puiset, Vicomte de Chartres from 1190, and Count of Bar-sur-Seine from 1189. He spent most of his life devoted to military affairs, being involved in the siege of Rouen in 1204, and the sieges of Béziers and Carcasonne during the Albigensian Crusade. Milo and his son Walter (Gaucher) were both killed in the fighting at siege of Damietta of the Fifth Crusade in 1219. He was the last of the Counts of Bar-sur-Seine of his line. After his death the County of Bar-sur-Seine was absorbed into the County of Champagne.

== Family ==
He married Hellesende de Joigny, daughter of Renaud IV de Joigny. They had a son:

- Walter, married Elisabeth of Courtenay, died at Damietta in 1219.
