= Manasses de Ramerupt =

Manasses (died after 4 February 1031), son of Hilduin III, Count of Montdidier. He was often mistaken for his uncle Manasses, Count of Dammartin.

Manasses married Beatrix of Hainaut, daughter of Reginar IV, Count of Mons, and Hedwig, daughter of Hugh Capet, widow of Ebles I, Count of Roucy. They had three children:

- Manasses I (d. 1085), Archbishop of Reims (1069-1080)
- Guy de Neufchâtel, (d. before 1103)
- Adela, Abbess of Notre-Dame de Laon.

No further information could be found on the descendants of Manasses.
