= Château de Bar-sur-Seine =

Medieval castle ruins in Grand Est, France

Coordinates: 48°6′48″N 4°22′21″E

The remains of the château de Bar-sur-Seine are the ruins of a medieval French fortified castle, destroyed in the 16th century. The site is in the town of Bar-sur-Seine in the Aube département.

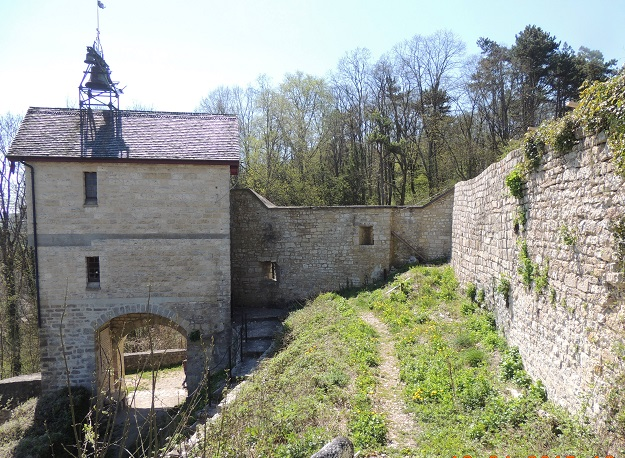
Château de Bar-sur- Seine

The historic importance of the castle was due to its position on the frontier between Champagne (a vassal county of the King of France) and the Burgundy (a duchy allied with the English) during the Hundred Years War. At the time, the château de Bar-sur-Seine was considered the most important in Burgundy. Its architecture is close in style to that of the Château de Peyrepertuse in Aude.

== Brief chronology ==
- 11th century : The Duchy of Burgundy includes the county of Bar-sur-Seine under Milon I
- 13th century : First building, adapted and altered into the 15th century
- 17 August 1219 : Death of Milon IV of Bar in the Crusades
- 1273 : Bar-sur-Seine passes into the hands of the Counts of Champagne, (Henri III le Gros)
- 14 August 1284 : Bar-sur-Seine passes into the hands of the King of France with the marriage of Jeanne de Navarre (born at Bar-sur-Seine) to Philippe IV le Bel
- 21 May 1410 : Treaty of Troyes cedes Bar-sur-Seine to the Dukes of Burgundy
- 5 January 1477 : Death of the Duke of Burgundy Charles le Téméraire; Bar-sur-Seine returns to the French crown.
- 1594 : Local inhabitants profit from the political disorder caused by the Wars of Religion and destroy the castle

The château de Bar-sur-Seine is a monument historique listed by the French Ministry of Culture.

== See also ==
- List of castles in France
