= Milo III of Bar-sur-Seine =

Milo III, in French Milon III (died 1151), was the Count of Bar-sur-Seine from 1147 until his death. He was the eldest son of Count Guy and Petronilla (Elizabeth) of Chacenay.

In 1147, Milo joined the Second Crusade, travelling with the army of Henry the Liberal, the heir to the County of Champagne. Little is known of his actions during the crusade. His father, whose death is unrecorded, may have been a victim of the crusade, although he is not recorded as having accompanied Milo. Milo was back in France by the end of 1149.

Milo married Agnes, heiress of Braine and the castle of Baudement. The couple had one daughter, Petronilla, born about 1150. A year later Milo fell ill while visiting Count Theobald II of Champagne and died in Troyes. The date of his death is sometimes given as 1 October 1151. On his deathbed he gave to the Abbey of Larivour the right to receive annually two sextarii of wheat and another two of messail (a mixture of wheat and rye) from the banal mills of Bar-sur-Seine. This gift was witnessed and confirmed by his mother, wife and daughter.

Petronilla inherited the county while still an infant and was placed under the regency of Milo's brother, Manasses, until Petronilla came of age. In 1168 she took over the county and married Hugh IV of Le Puiset. Agnes re-married to the widower Count Robert I of Dreux. She was still living in 1217.

== Sources ==
- Coutant, Lucien (1854). Histoire de la ville et de l'ancien comté de Bar-sur-Seine. Vol. 1. Librairie Doussot.
- Evergates, Theodore (1999). "Aristocratic Women in the County of Champagne". In Theodore Evergates (ed.). Aristocratic Women in Medieval France. University of Pennsylvania Press. pp. 74–110.
- Evergates, Theodore (2007). The Aristocracy in the County of Champagne, 1100–1300. University of Pennsylvania Press.
- Evergates, Theodore (2016). Henry the Liberal: Count of Champagne, 1127–1181. University of Pennsylvania Press.
- Perry, Guy (2018). The Briennes: The Rise and Fall of a Champenois Dynasty in the Age of the Crusades, c.950–1356. Cambridge University Press.
