= List of counts of Roucy =

This article is a list of the counts of Roucy. In medieval France, Roucy was a county held by a succession of noble families. By the Late Middle Ages, it was one of seven titles that was made a peer within the provincial peerage of the greater County and Province of Champagne up until the French Revolution.

== First counts ==
c.950–967 : Renaud of Roucy, Count of Roucy and of Reims († 967):

married Albérade, daughter of Gilbert, Duke of Lotharingia, and of Gerberga of Saxony (she remarried to king Louis IV of France).

967–c.1000 : Gilbert of Roucy, Count of Roucy and Viscount of Reims († c.1000), son of the former:

No document of the era mentions the relationship between Gilbert and his successor Ebles I. It has long been thought that Ebles of Roucy was a son of Gilbert and of a daughter of William III, Duke of Poitiers.
A recent study proposed another theory : Ebles I of Roucy was a son of Ebles of Poitiers (himself the son of William IV, Duke of Poitiers and of Emma of Blois) and of a daughter of Aubry II, count of Mâcon, and of Ermentrude of Roucy, sister of Gilbert of Roucy.

c.1000–1033 : Ebles I of Roucy, Count of Roucy and Archbishop of Reims (1021–1033):

married Béatrice of Hainaut, daughter of Regnier IV, Count of Hainaut and of Hedwig, a daughter of Hugh Capet.

== House of Montdidier ==
Montdidier : De gueules à la rose d'or.

- 1033–1063: Hilduin, Count of Ramerupt and Roucy, son-in-law of the above,

married in 1031 to Alix de Roucy (c.1020-1062), daughter of Ebles I.

- 1063–1103: Ebles II, son of the above,

married Sybille de Hauteville, daughter of Robert Guiscard, Duke of Apulia.

- 1103–1160: Hugh I, son of the above,

married Richildis von Stauffen, daughter of Frederick I, Duke of Swabia.

- 1160–1180: Guiscard, son of the above,

married Elisabeth de Mareuil, dame de Neufchatel-sur-Aisne.

- 1180–1196: Raoul I, son of the above,

married Isabelle de Coucy, daughter of Raoul I, Seigneur de Coucy; their only child was a daughter who became a nun.

- 1196–1200: John I, brother of above,

married Beatrice de Vignory; had no legitimate offspring.

- 1200–1205?: Enguerrand, brother-in-law of Raoul I.

== House of Pierrepont ==
Pierrepont : Gules a chief indented Or.

Blazon of arms: Gules a chief indented Or.

- 1205–1251: John II, grandson of Count Guiscard through his mother (his sister Elisabeth, Viscountess of Mareuil, x Marshal Robert de Coucy-Pinon, without posterity):

married in first marriage to Isabelle of Dreux, daughter of Robert II and Yolande of Coucy (sister of Isabelle / Mélissende wife of Raoul I above) married in second marriage to Joan of Dampierre (?) married in third marriage to Marie of Dammartin († 1279), daughter of Simon, Count of Aumale x Marie, Countess of Ponthieu (niece of Philippe Auguste).

- 1251–1271: John III, son of the previous count and of Marie of Dammartin (→ a sister of John III, x Jean de Garlande, sire de Possesse):

married to Isabelle de Mercœur daughter of Béraud VIII x Béatrice de Bourbon-Dampierre.

- 1271–1304: John IV, Lord of Pierrepont and Viscount of Mareuil (Killed 18 August 1304 at the Battle of Mons-en-Pévèle), son of the previous count:

married to Joan of Dreux, Lady of La Suze daughter of Robert IV, Count of Dreux and of Braine and of Beatrice, Countess of Montfort and Lady of La Suze.

- 1304–1346: John V (Killed 26 August 1346 at the Battle of Crécy), John V abandoned the arms of the House of Pierrepont for the Blue Lion on a field of gold (Blazon: Or a lion azure armed and langued gules). Ebles I, ancestral Count of Roucy, also displayed the Blue Lion→ Siblings: Béatrice de La Suze, x Amaury III de Craon; and Marie, x Jean II de Châteauvillain:

married to Marguerite de Baumetz (Bommiers, Bomez, Beaumez) Lady of Blaison, Chemillé, Mirebeau and Montfaucon (-en-Berry and not Montfaucon, very likely), probable daughter of Marguerite de Nemours-Villebéon and Thibaud (II) the Younger, son of Robert IV de Bommiers and his 2nd wife Yolande de Mello (to be distinguished from his half-brothers and sister, the children of Robert IV de Bommiers x 1st Mathilde / Mahaut de Déols grand-niece of Raoul VI de Déols-Châteauroux: Marguerite, x 1 ° Louis I of Beaujeu-Montferrand and x 2 ° Henri III of Sully; Robert de Bommiers; Thibaud (Ier) the Elder).

- 1346–1364: Robert II, son of the previous count:

married to Marie d'Enghien, daughter of Gautier II d'Enghien, Knight, Lord of Enghien, Advocate of Tubize.

- 1364–1370: Isabelle of Pierrepont, daughter of the previous count, married to Louis of Flandre-Namur, son of John I, without posterity.

Isabelle sold Roucy to Louis I of Anjou in 1370, but her uncle Simon of Pierrepont asserted his right of foreclosure and sued the Parlement of Paris to obtain the county. The trial lasted 20 years and was judged in his favor.

- 1370–1384: Louis I of Anjou, Duke of Anjou, son of John II of France.
- 1384–1390: Louis II of Anjou, son of the previous count.

- 1390–1392: Simon of Pierrepont, son of John V, count of Braine and of Roucy after the death of his niece Isabelle.

→ Siblings of counts Simon and Robert II: Hugh of Pierrepont, Vidame of Laon by his marriage to Marie de Clacy-et-Thierret / Clacy; Béatrice, x Louis II of Sancerre <John III of Sancerre, and Louis of Sancerre, Marshal of France and Constable of France; Jeanne de Blaison and Chemellier / Chemillé, x the Grand Panetier and Marshal of France Charles I of Montmorency.

married to Marie of the House of Châtillon, daughter of Hugues de Pont-Arcy / Pontarci and granddaughter of the Constable of France Gaucher V de Châtillon.

- 1392–1395: Hugh II of Pierrepont, son of the previous count:

→ Siblings: John of Roucy, Bishop of Laon in 1386–1419; Marguerite x 1 ° Gaucher V de Nanteuil-la-Forêt (in the Montagne de Reims) and x 2 ° Robert III de Coucy-Pinon, great-grandson of Marshal Robert above (by another x that with Elisabeth of Roucy, Viscountess of Mareuil); Marie, x Jacques d'Enghien-Havré: maternal grandparents of Jean de Dunois.

married to Blanche de Coucy- Lady of Encre, Bailleul-en-Vimeu, La Ferté-Gaucher and Montmirel, granddaughter of William of Coucy.

→ Their daughters Marguerite, Lady of Albert, and Blanche of Roucy-Pierrepont, married respectively: in 1403 Thomas III del Vasto, Marquess of Saluzzo (hence Giovanna, Dame d'Encre, wife of Guy IV de Clermont-Nesle); and in 1414 Louis I of Bourbon-Vendôme, Count of Vendôme, Grand Master of France.

- 1395–1415: John VI of Pierrepont, Lord of Château de Montmirail (killed 25 October 1415 at the Battle of Agincourt), son of the previous count.

→ His sister Joan, x François d'Albret sire of Ste-Bazeille († 1435), first cousin of the Constable Charles I d'Albret, Bernard Ezi IV-V d'Albret.

== House of Sarrebruck ==
Sarrebruck : d'azur semé de croisettes recroisetés au pied fiché d'or au lion d'argent, armé, lampassé et couronné d'or brochant sur le tout.

- 1415–1459: Joan of Pierrepont-Roucy, daughter of the previous count, married in 1417 to Robert I of Saarbrücken-Commercy (Robert III), damoiseau de Commercy-Château-Haut and Lord of Louvois († 1460):

Only daughter, Joan of Pierrepont brought the counties of Roucy and Braine to her husband Robert of Saarbrücken-Commercy → They had as children John VII of Saarbrücken-Commercy; Amé II of Saarbrücken-Commercy; Marie, Dame de Bailleul, x Jean II de Melun d'Antoing, d'Épinoy, Lord of Ghent; and Jeanne, x Christophe de Barbençon-Jeumont, Lord of Cany.

- 1459–1492: John VII of Sarrebruck-Commercy, son of the previous ones, was count of Roucy by the donation made to him by his mother on condition for him to bear the name and arms of Roucy, married to Catherine d'Orléans-Longueville daughter of Dunois above, died without legitimate children (→ but leaving two natural children: Louis, seigneur de Sissonne and Marguerite).
- 1492–1504: Robert II of Saarbrücken-Commercy (Robert IV), nephew of the previous one, son of Amé II of Saarbrücken-Commercy and of Guillemette of Luxembourg-Ligny, daughter of Thibault, seigneur de Fiennes; grandson of Joan of Pierrepont x Robert I / III above:

married to Marie de Chaumont d'Amboise, Dame de Ricey, daughter of Charles I and niece of Cardinal d'Amboise. → They have a son, Amé III from Saarbrücken-Commercy; and three daughters: Philippe (de Commercy and Montmirail; wife of Charles de Silly, Lord of Rochefort, Auneau, and La Roche-Guyon); Catherine (de Roucy; wife Antoine de Roye); and Guillemette (de Braine; wife of Robert III de La Marck, duc de Bouillon.

- 1504–1525: Amé III of Saarbrücken-Commercy, son of the previous one, married in 1520 to Renée de La Marck, daughter of Guillaume d'Aigremont and granddaughter of Sanglier des Ardennes, they had only one son, Robert, died in infancy. When Amé III died, his three sisters shared his inheritance: Philippe / Philippine (x Charles de Silly) obtained Commercy-Château-Haut, Einville, Montmirail, Louvois; Catherine: Roucy and Pierrepont; Guillemette (x Robert III de La Marck): Braine, Pontarcy, La Ferté-Gaucher, Neufchâtel.

== House of Roye ==
- 1525–1542: Catherine of Saarbrücken, sister of Amé III of Saarbrücken-Commercy and daughter of Robert II of Saarbrücken-Commercy, married in 1505 to Antoine de Roye († 1515).
- 1542–1551: Charles I of Roye, son of the previous count, married to Madeleine de Mailly, Dame de Conti.

→ Their daughter Éléonore, Dame de Conti, x Louis I, Prince of Conde: hence the following of the Princes of Conde and Conti.

== House of La Rochefoucauld ==
de Roye de la Rochefoucault: Ecartelé aux 1 et 4 de gueules à la bande d'argent; aux 2 et 3 burelé d'argent et d'azur de 10 pièces à trois chevrons de gueules brochant sur le tour, le premier écimé; sur le tout d'or au lion d'azur (armé et lampassé de gueules.)

- 1551–1572: Charlotte de Roye (1537-1572), daughter of the previous one and sister of Éléonore de Conti,

married in 1557 to François III, Count of La Rochefoucauld (1521-1572) (Francis I, Count of Roucy; from a 1 ° x with Silvia Pic de La Mirandole, from whom descend Francis IV and the following of the counts then dukes of La Rochefoucauld until 1762).

- 1572–1589: Josué de La Rochefoucauld-Roye, † 1589, eldest son of the above, without alliance.
- 1589–1605: Charles II de La Rochefoucauld-Roye (1560-1605), younger brother of the previous one,

married in 1600 to Claude de Gontaut-Biron, † 1617, daughter of Marshal of France Armand.

- 1605–1680: François II-I de La Rochefoucauld-Roye (1603-1680), son of the previous one,

married in 1627 to Julienne Catherine de La Tour d'Auvergne, daughter of Henri de La Tour d'Auvergne and Elizabeth of Nassau daughter of William the Silent.

- 1680–1690: Frédéric-Charles de La Rochefoucauld-Roye (around 1633–1690), son of the previous count,

married in 1656 to his cousin Elisabeth de Durfort de Duras, granddaughter of Henri de La Tour d'Auvergne, daughter of Guy-Aldonce I and sister of Jacques Henri de Durfort,

- 1690–1721: François III-II de La Rochefoucauld-Roye (1660-1721), son of the previous one. → Her younger brother Charles, Comte de Blanzac (1665-1732), x 1691 Marie-Henriette d'Aloigny made the Dukes of Estissac, then of Liancourt, then of La Rochefoucauld since 1792; their younger brother Louis (1672-1751) made the Marquis of Roye and La Ferté-sous-Jouarre, Dukes of Anville, then of La Rochefoucauld in 1762-1792:

married in 1689 to Catherine-Françoise d'Arpajon (1670-1716), daughter of Duke Louis and Catherine-Henriette d'Harcourt de Beuvron, heir to the duchy-peerage of Arpajon since 1672.

- 1721–1725: François IV-III de La Rochefoucauld-Roye (1689-1725), son of the previous count,

married in 1711 to Marguerite-Elisabeth Huguet de Sémonville, † 1735 → their youngest daughter Françoise-Pauline, Mlle de Roye (1723- guillotined in 1793/1794), x 1740 Marshal Louis-Antoine, Duke of Gontaut-Biron (1701-1788).

== House of Béthune ==
- 1725–1784: Marthe-Elisabeth de la Rochefoucauld, Madamoiselle de Roucy (1720-1784), eldest daughter of the previous one:

married in 1737 to François Joseph de Béthune (1719- † 1739) 17, marquis d'Ancenis.

- 1784–1789 : Armand-Joseph de Béthune (1738 † 1800), marquis de Chârost,

married 1 ° 1760 to Louise-Suzanne Edmée Martel lady of Fontaine-Martel and Fontaine-Bolbec (in Bolbec) → their second son Armand-Louis François Edmé (1770- guillotined in April 1794); and 2 ° 1783 to Henriette Adélaïde du Bouchet de Sourches below, without posterity.

He is the last to bear the hereditary title of Count of Roucy. In 1767 he sold his title to a very distant cousin, Jacques Henri Salomon Joseph de Roucy (1747-1814), Lord of Manre (his family also owned Termes and Marvaux in the vicinity), from Hugues de Thosny and du Bois younger brother of Count Robert Guiscard above, known as Count of Roucy, field marshal and colonel of the Queen's cavalry regiment, husband of Marie Perrine de Scépeaux, but died without posterity in 1814.
