= Walter I of Brienne =

Walter I of Brienne (1020 – 1089), was a count of Brienne and Bar-sur-Seine. He was the son of Engelbert IV of Brienne, count of Brienne, whom he succeeded. He attended the council of Senlis in 1048 and was excommunicated in 1082.

== Biography ==
Born in 1020, Walter was the son of Engelbert IV of Brienne and Pétronille. He became count of Brienne on the death of his father around 1035.

On 22 May 1048, he attended the council of Senlis, presided over by Guy of Châtillon, bishop of Reims, and King Henry I of France.

Around 1082, Walter was in dispute with the Abbaye of Montier-en-Der. Theobald III, Count of Blois, was obliged to intervene and requested Hughes of Die, legate of the pope, to excommunicate Walter.

== Marriage and issue ==
Walter married Eustachie de Tonnerre, daughter of Milo III, count of Tonnerre and 'Azeka. They had the following children:

- Engelbert of Brienne, became a monk at the Abbaye de Molesme
- Erard I, Count of Brienne, count of Brienne, married Alice of Ramerupt
- Milo II of Bar-sur-Seine, count of Bar-sur-Seine, married Matilda of Noyers
- Perrenelle of Brienne, married Theobald, count of Reynel
- Mantia de Brienne, married Fulk IV, count of Anjou, but was repudiated (Note: Perry mentions only the possibility of a daughter of Walter marrying Fulk IV of Anjou. No specific daughter is named.)

== Sources ==
- Bouchard, Constance Brittain, ed. (2004). The Cartulary of Montier-en-Der, 666–1129. University of Toronto Press.
- Perry, Guy (2018). The Briennes: The Rise and Fall of a Champenois Dynasty in the Age of the Crusades, c. 950–1356. Cambridge University Press.
