= Bagnols-sur-Cèze =

Commune in Occitania, France

Bagnols-sur-Cèze Banhòus de Céser (Occitan)
- Commune
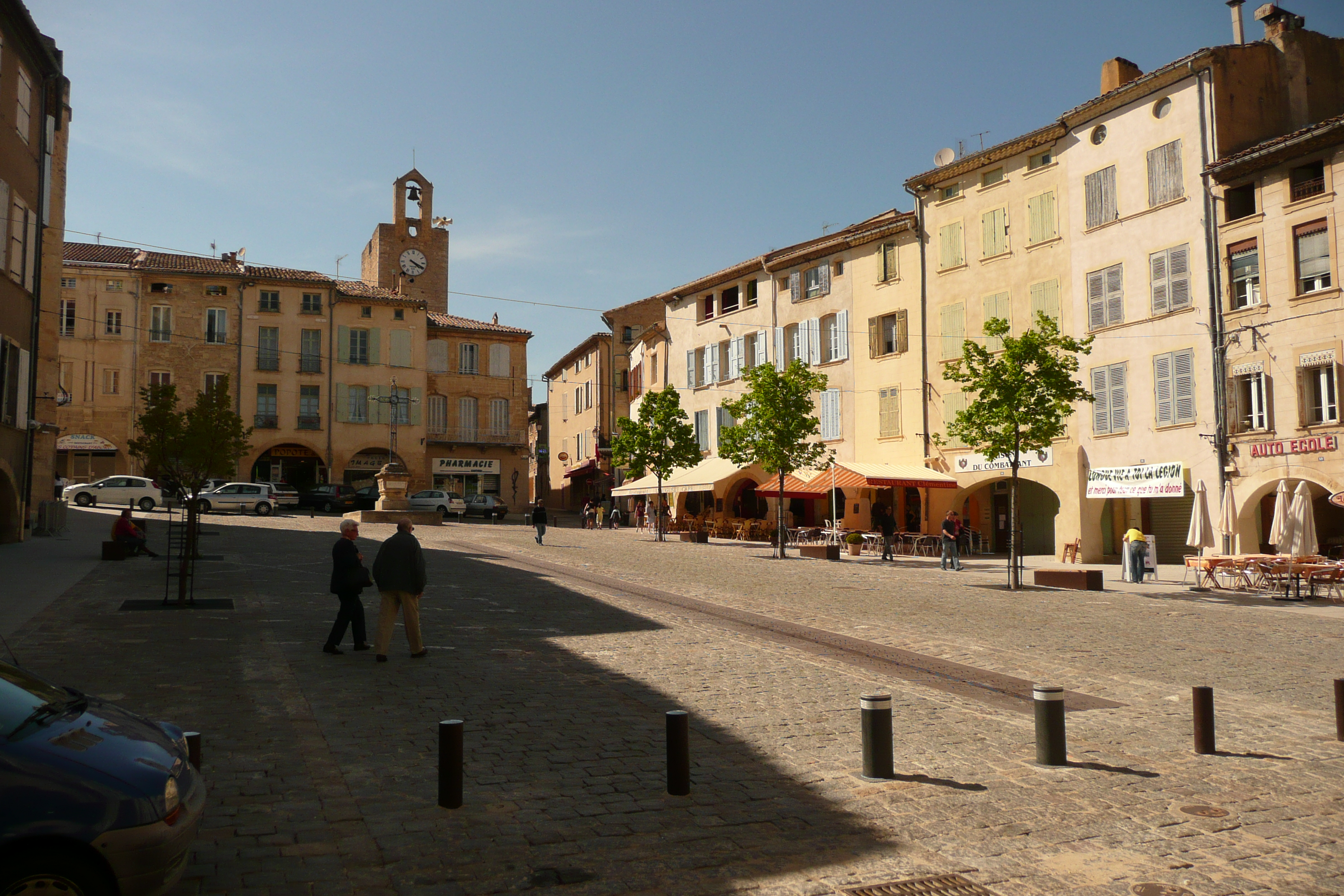
- The main square in Bagnols-sur-Cèze

- Coat of arms
- Location of Bagnols-sur-Cèze
- Location within France Location within Occitanie
- Coordinates: 44°09′44″N 4°37′09″E
- Country: France
- Region: Occitania
- Department: Gard
- Arrondissement: Nîmes
- Canton: Bagnols-sur-Cèze
- Intercommunality: CA du Gard Rhodanien

Government
  - Mayor (2026–32): Pascale Bordes (RN)
- Area^{1}: 31.37 km^{2} (12.11 sq mi)
- Elevation: 47 m (154 ft)
- Highest elevation: 268 m (879 ft)
- Lowest elevation: 30 m (98 ft)
- Population (2023): 18,112
  - Density: 577.4/km^{2} (1,495/sq mi)
- Demonym: Bagnolais
- Time zone: UTC+01:00 (CET)
  - Summer (DST): UTC+02:00 (CEST)
- INSEE/Postal code: 30028 /30200
- Website: www.bagnolssurceze.fr
- ^{1} French Land Register data, which excludes lakes, ponds, glaciers > 1 km^{2} (0.386 sq mi or 247 acres) and river estuaries.

Bagnols-sur-Cèze (French pronunciation: [baɲɔl syʁ sɛz]; lit. 'Bagnols-on-Cèze'; Occitan: Banhòus de Céser) is a commune in the Gard department in the Occitania region in Southern France.

== History ==
A small regional centre, Bagnols-sur-Cèze was quite certainly a Roman town (the name of the town comes from the Latin balnearius meaning "related to baths, bathing-place") before the main part was built in the 13th century around a central arcaded square that is still preserved today. At the same period, the regional market was installed here, undoubtedly contributing to its expansion.

== Demographics ==
Bagnols-sur-Ceze expanded steadily after the Marcoule nuclear centre was established in 1956.

Historical population

Year	Pop.	±% p.a.
1793	4,800	—
1800	4,888	+0.26%
1806	4,994	+0.36%
1821	4,921	−0.10%
1831	4,902	−0.04%
1836	4,847	−0.23%
1841	4,090	−3.34%
1846	4,827	+3.37%
1851	4,780	−0.20%
1856	4,870	+0.37%
1861	5,050	+0.73%
1866	5,184	+0.53%
1872	4,876	−1.02%
1876	4,930	+0.28%
1881	4,666	−1.09%
1886	4,458	−0.91%
1891	4,454	−0.02%
1896	4,500	+0.21%
1901	4,461	−0.17%

Year	Pop.	±% p.a.
1906	4,582	+0.54%
1911	4,445	−0.61%
1921	3,918	−1.25%
1926	4,450	+2.58%
1931	4,481	+0.14%
1936	4,669	+0.83%
1946	5,211	+1.10%
1954	5,546	+0.78%
1962	12,905	+11.13%
1968	16,468	+4.15%
1975	17,534	+0.90%
1982	17,602	+0.06%
1990	17,872	+0.19%
1999	18,103	+0.14%
2007	18,512	+0.28%
2012	18,375	−0.15%
2017	18,258	−0.13%
2023	18,112	−0.13%

Source: EHESS and INSEE (1968–2023)

== Sights ==
The old center of Bagnols-sur-Cèze retains its historic feel, with small streets and largely preserved architecture. Several façades are remarkable. The towns contains a notable museum of contemporary art, the Musée Albert-André, founded in 1868 as well as an archaeological museum with a collection of artifacts found mainly in nearby Roman sites.

The shoegaze music band named Alcest is from this city.

There are several murals featuring optical illusions.

== International relations ==
Bagnols-sur-Cèze is twinned with:

- Braunfels, Germany, since 1959
- Feltre, Italy, since 1961
- Newbury, England, since 1971
- Eeklo, Belgium, since 1976
- Carcaixent, Spain, since 1982
- Kiskunfélegyháza, Hungary

== Notable people ==
- Gersonides (born 1288), Jewish philosopher, Talmudist, mathematician, physician and astronomer/astrologer
- Albéric Pont (1870-1960), dentist and pioneer in maxillofacial surgery
- Lionel Pérez (born 1967), goalkeeper
- Neige (born 1985), blackgaze musician
- Sandie Toletti (born 1995), footballer for Real Madrid and the France women's national team

Albert André, art collector of late 19th century art, who bequeathed his magnificent collection to the town of Bagnols-sur-Cèze, where it resides in the Mairie, as the Musée Albert André

== See also ==
- Communes of the Gard department
- List of works by Auguste Carli
