= Hilduin I of Montdidier =

French noble

Hilduin I (died before 956), Count of Montdidier. It is unknown who the parents of Hilduin were. Hilduin was the founder of the House of Montdidier, which produced the Counts of Montdidier, Dammartin and Roucy.

There is considerable confusion as to the immediate family of Hilduin among historians and genealogists because of the lack of documented evidence, the preponderance of the names of Hilduin and Manasses in the family and the existence of other contemporary Hilduins (particularly, the Count of Montreuil).

The only creditable reference to Hilduin I was when Philip I, King of France, donated the village of Bagneux to the Abbey of Saint-Germain-des-Prés in exchange for Combs la Ville by charter dated 1061, which recounts that Hugh the Great had granted Combs to Hilduino…comiti de Monte qui vocatur Desiderius, who died before his benefactor (before 956), and that Henry I, King of France, had regranted Combs to Manasses nepos supradicti Hilduini comitis [Manasses, grandson of Hilduin] just as suus avunculus Hilduinus [his uncle Hilduin] had held it, noting that Odo comes filius prefati Manassetis [Odo, son of Manasses] now claimed the property.

Historians disagree as to the exact disposition of the descendants, but all agree that they descended from Hersende, Dame of Ramerupt, who was married to Hilduin I. In 948, the first church in Montdidier, Somme, was built near the castle of Charlemagne by Hersende.

== Marriage and Issue ==
The count and his wife had two children:

- Hilduin II, Count of Arcis-sur-Aube and Seigneur de Ramerupt
- Manasses (Manassé) (d. 991), Bishop of Troyes

The next known Count of Montdidier was Hilduin III, grandson of Hilduin I. The apparent gap in the countship is unexplained.

A common mistake is to assume the Hugh I, Count of Ponthieu, husband of Gisele, daughter of Hugh Capet, was the son of Hilduin I, when, in fact, his father was Hilduin (Herluin), Count of Montreuil, as discussed by Flodoard.
