= Ebles I of Roucy =

Ebles I
- Count of Roucy
- Reign: c. 1000 – 1033
- Predecessor: Gilbert of Roucy
- Successor: Hilduin IV of Montdidier
- Died: 11 May 1033
- Spouse: Beatrice of Hainaut
- Issue: Alix, wife of Hilduin IV, Count of Montdidier; Hedwig, wife of Goeffrey IV of Florennes
- Father: Gilbert of Roucy (disputed)

Ebles I of Roucy (died 11 May 1033) was count of Roucy from 1000 to 1033 and archbishop of Reims from 1021 to 1033.

== Possible family origins ==
In Genealogiciæ Scriptoris Fusniacensis he is referred as the brother of:

1. Eudes (Odo) Roucy, called "the Strong" († 27 August after 1021), lord of Rumigny.
2. Liétaud (also Letard or Letald) de Roucy, Lord of Marle. Liétaud's daughter Adèle de Marle married first Aubry, Viscount of Coucy, and second the scandalous Crusader Enguerrand I, Lord of Coucy, with whom she had issue.
3. Yvette (possibly either Judith or Dada) de Roucy who married either Manasses II or Manasses III of Rethel.

Although he is traditionally considered to have been the son of his predecessor, Giselbert, Count of Roucy and Reims and an unnamed daughter of William III "Towhead", Duke of Aquitaine, no contemporary document mentions a wife or children for Giselbert. Instead, a novel theory by Jean-Noël Mathieu resolves some inconsistencies by placing Giselbert as his matrilineal great-uncle.

The new study, based on onomastic data, suggests that Ebles I was the son of Ebles de Poitiers (son of William IV, Duke of Aquitaine and Emma of Blois) and an unnamed daughter of Aubry II, Count of Mâcon and Ermentrude of Roucy, Giselbert of Roucy's sister.

Mathieu further notes that the conventional theory does not take into account that:

- The first name Liétaud is traditionally associated with the Counts of Mâcon, but not with the Roucy family;
- The first name Eudes is traditionally associated with the Robertians, the Herbertiens, or the House of Blois;
- The lands of Rumigny and Coucy had previously belonged to the Counts of Blois, but later passed to the Roucy line.

== Marriage and descendants ==
Ebles married Beatrice of Hainaut, the daughter of Reginar IV, Count of Mons and Hedwig of France (daughter of Hugh Capet). From this union he had:

- 1. Alix, who succeeded him, and was married to Hilduin IV of Montdidier, Count of Ramerupt and Roucy, by whom she was the mother of Ebles II of Roucy. Her daughter, Margaret de Roucy, married Hugh, Count of Clermont, and they were the parents of Adeliza, who married Gilbert Fitz Richard;
- 2. Hedwig, who inherited the lands of Rumigny after the death of her uncle, Eudes, and married Geoffrey IV, Lord of Florennes.

Around 1020, Ebles separated from his wife and took holy orders, being therefore elected archbishop of Reims. He also became count of Reims in 1023 and afterwards bound the county to the archdiocese. Beatrice then went on to marry Manasses de Ramerupt.

== Notes and references ==
Catholic Church titles
| Preceded by Arnulf | Archbishop of Reims; 1021–1033 | Succeeded by Guy of Roucy |
