= Alberich Rabensteiner =

Austrian Cistercian monk (1875–1945)

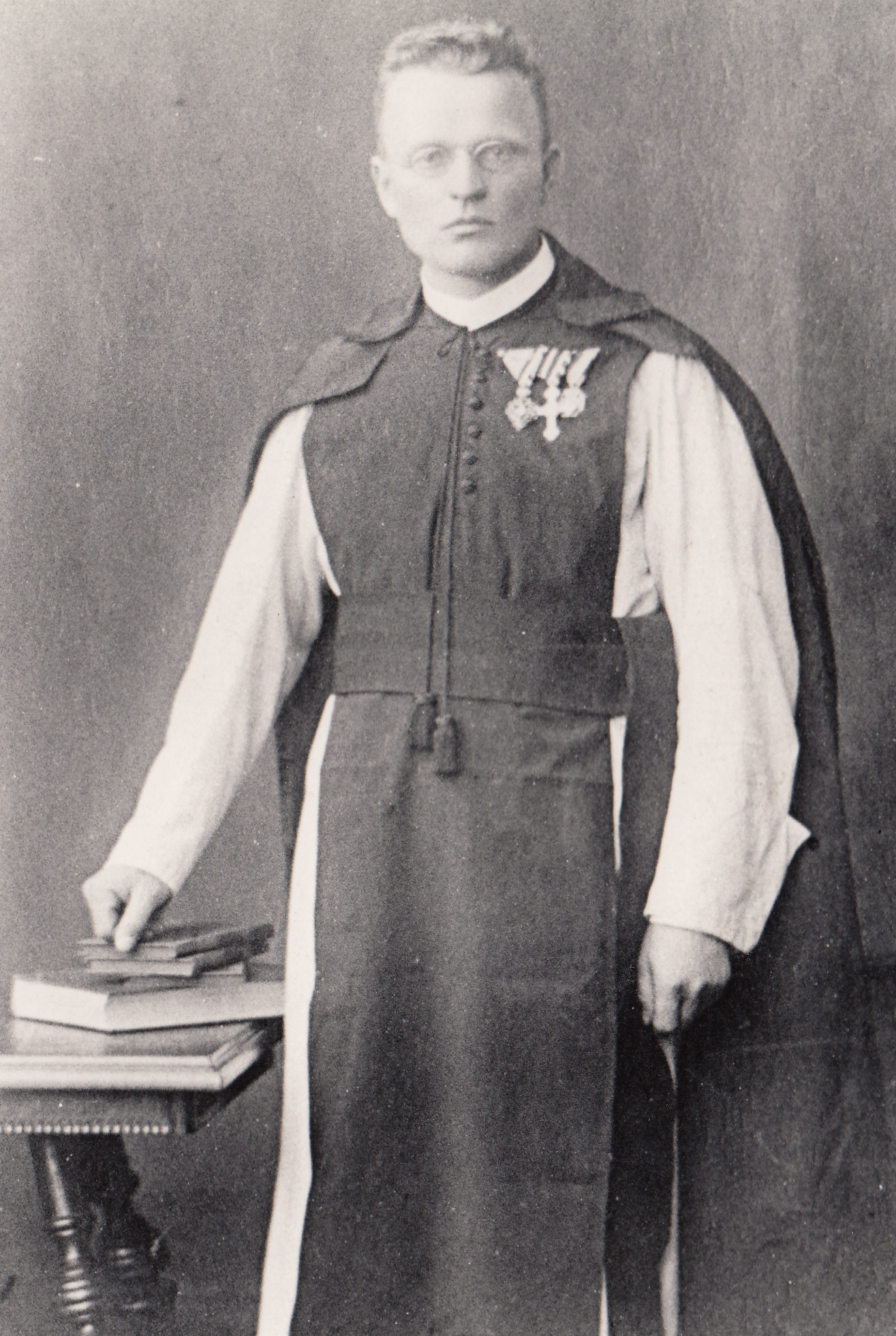
- Alberich Rabensteiner in 1918
- Born: 28 January 1875; Villanders, South Tyrol, Italy
- Died: 2 April 1945 (aged 70); Wiener Neustadt, Austria
- Occupation: Administrator

Alberich Rabensteiner (28 January 1875 – 2 April 1945) was a Cistercian monk who practiced at Heiligenkreuz Abbey. He was also prior and pastor at Neukloster Priory, Wiener Neustadt, Austria.

== Life ==
Alois Rabensteiner entered the Cistercian Order in 1898 at Heiligenkreuz Abbey where he was given the name Alberich. He made his perpetual religious vows on 1 June 1903, and was ordained a priest on 25 July 1903. After serving as chaplain at St. Valentin, he was sent to Neukloster Priory in Wiener Neustadt, where he co-founded the Sodality of Our Lady. Rabensteiner was the parish priest in Sulz, Upper Austria, from 1910 to 1915. In September 1916 he became the parish priest for Gaaden. He was drafted for military service in 1916 at the height of World War I and acted as military chaplain in Wels, Upper Austria and later at the Italian Front in South Tyrol and at Bukovina.

In 1918 he was appointed prior and pastor of the Neukloster. From 1922 onwards, he became dean of Wiener Neustadt and from 1934 became dean of Weigelsdorf, Ebreichsdorf. In the Martyrology Sancrucense, Rabensteiner is described as a religious firebrand, with a deep Marian spirituality. His desk calendar, which he used to record his thoughts, contains the entry "amo nesciri et pro nihil reputari“ (I love being unknown and to be thought of as nothing).

== Death and Martyrdom ==
In the spring of 1945, Wiener Neustadt was subject to heavy air raids by the Allied Forces, killing many people. Although a large number of people fled from the city, Rabensteiner stayed and continued his duty. During Holy Week, as the Red Army advanced on Wiener Neustadt, Rabensteiner and the few remaining monks celebrated Mass in the sacristy or the basement of the already heavily damaged monastery. On Easter Monday, 2 April, the Red Army entered the city after heavy artillery bombardment and fights with the remaining German forces. Rabensteiner removed the bodies of fallen German soldiers from the street beside the monastery to prevent them being run over by Russian tanks. The following events cannot be reconstructed with certainty. One source, Adolf Höggerl, who had left Rabensteiner and based his later report on a secondary source, wrote that a Russian Officer had violently objected to the removal of the bodies and had rushed into the church shouting for the priest. A young woman fled screaming from the church, and Rabensteiner, who had heard her screams, quickly ran into the church. The other version of events (a written testimonial by Sister M. Burgharda) claims that Rabensteiner hid a young woman, who was being pursued by a Russian soldier, in the kitchen and was seen talking to the soldier, who then followed him inside. Rabensteiner was found shot dead in front of the high altar of the church. He was buried in the Neukloster's abbey church.

Father Alberich Rabensteiner is named as a martyr in the Austrian martyrology of the twentieth century.
