= Manasses II of Rethel =

Manasses II, Count of Rethel
- Died: 1032
- Noble family: de Rethel
- Spouse: Dada
- Issue: Manasses III, Count of Rethel
- Father: Manasses of Omont
- Mother: Castricia

Manasses II, Count of Rethel (died 1032) was a son of Manasses of Omont and his wife, Castricia. He manifested himself in the early 11th century as Count of Rethel.

He was married to Dada (possibly either Judith or Yvette), according to a recent study she was most likely the sister of Eble I of Roucy, and a maternal granddaughter of Ermentrude de Roucy.

He was the father of Manasses III, who succeeded him, and perhaps Doda, the wife of Godfrey III, Duke of Lower Lorraine.

Manasses II of Rethel Died: 1032
Preceded by Manasses I	Count of Rethel ? – 1032	Succeeded by Manasses III
