= Ermentrude of Roucy =

Countess and Duchess of Burgundy as the consort of Otto-William

- Countess of Mâcon; Countess of Burgundy
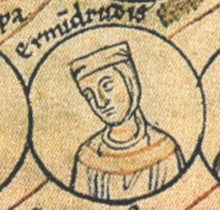
- Born: c. 951; Reims
- Died: 5 May 1005; Mâcon
- Spouses: Aubry II of Mâcon; Otto-William, Count of Burgundy
- Issue: Létaud; Aubry; Béatrice de Mâcon; Guy I of Mâcon; Matilda; Gerberga; Reginald I, Count of Burgundy; Agnes of Burgundy, Duchess of Aquitaine
- Father: Renaud of Roucy
- Mother: Alberade of Lorraine

Ermentrude de Roucy (c. 951 – 5 May 1005) (Irmtrude) was a Countess and Duchess of Burgundy.

Ermentrude was a daughter of Renaud of Roucy and his wife, Alberade of Lorraine, daughter of Gilbert, Duke of Lorraine.

By 971, Ermentrude married Aubry II of Mâcon and thus became a countess of Mâcon. They had:

- Létaud, archbishop of Besançon;
- Aubry, abbot of Saint-Paul de Besançon;
- Béatrice de Mâcon (d.1030), who was married in 975 to Count Geoffrey I of Gâtinais, and afterwards to the Count Hugues du Perche;
- Perhaps a daughter, N de Mâcon, the putative spouse of Eble de Poitiers, son of William IV of Aquitaine and Emma of Blois; they were possibly the parents of Ebles I of Roucy and all of his siblings, including Yvette de Roucy, the wife of either Manasses II or Manasses III of Rethel.

Ermentrude also married Otto-William, Count of Burgundy. They had:

- Guy I of Mâcon
- Matilda, married Landri of Nevers
- Gerberga, married William II of Provence
- Reginald I, Count of Burgundy
- Agnes of Burgundy, Duchess of Aquitaine, married William V of Aquitaine

== Sources ==
- Bouchard, Constance Brittain (1987). Sword, Miter, and Cloister: Nobility and the Church in Burgundy, 980-1198. Cornell University Press.
- Commire, Anne; Klezmer, Deborah, eds. (2000). Women in World History: Ead-Fur. Yorkin Publications.
- Mathieu, Jean-Noël (2000). La succession au comté de Roucy aux environs de l’an mil. Vol. 3. Prosopographica et Genealogica, Unit for Prosopographical Research. ISBN 1-900934-01-9.
