= Grand Chamberman of France =

The Grand Chamberman of France (French: Grand chambrier de France) was one of the Great Officers of the Crown of France during the Ancien Régime. It is similar in name, but should not be confused with, the office of Grand Chamberlain of France (Grand Chambellan de France), although both positions could accurately be translated by the word chamberlain.

== The office ==
The Grand Chamberman was the head of the King's chamber. Under the early Capetian kings, the Grand Chamberman managed the royal treasury (or King's Treasury) with the Grand Butler of France. Later, the Grand Chamberman lost control of the treasury under Philip Augustus to the Knights Templar, before the Chamber of Accounts, created by Philip IV the Fair, and the Superintendent of Finances, established in 1311, took over this function.

This officer held one of the five great offices of the crown. He was not only distinguished from the Grand Chamberlain of France, but in some ways, he was superior to him in the extent of his power, because he signed charters and other important documents. For a long time, he preceded the Constable of France and also served as a judge within the judicial assemblies appointed by the Peers of France.

From 1312, the office of Grand Chamberman was hereditary in the House of Bourbon.
King Francis I abolished this office in 1545 in favor of that of First Gentleman of the Chamber (French: Premier gentilhomme de la chambre).

== List of Grand Chambermen of France ==
- 1060-1065: Renaud
- 1065-1085: Galeran de Senlis
- 1106-1121: Guy de Senlis
- 1121-1130: Guillaume de Senlis
- 1130-1150: Alberic II of Dammartin
- 1151-1175: Mathieu II de Beaumont-sur-Oise
- 1178-1191: Adam I de Beaumont-Gâtinais
- 1190-1207: Mathieu III de Beaumont-sur-Oise
- 1209-1209: Ursion de Nemours
- 1209-1234: Barthélemy de Roye
- 1234-1240: Jean I de Beaumont-Gâtinais
- 1240-1256: Jean de Nanteuil
- 1258-1270: Alfonso of Brienne
- 1270-1277: Érard de Vallery
- 1277-1306: Robert II de Bourgogne
- 1306-1309: John II of Dreux
- 1312-1341: Louis I, Duke of Bourbon
- 1341-1346: Peter I, Duke of Bourbon
- 1357-1410: Louis II, Duke of Bourbon
- 1410-1434: John I, Duke of Bourbon
- 1434-1456: Charles I, Duke of Bourbon
- 1458-1488: John II, Duke of Bourbon
- 1488-1503: Peter II, Duke of Bourbon
- 1520-1527: Charles III, Duke of Bourbon
- 1527-1536: Henry, Duke of Orléans
- 1536-1545: Charles II, Duke of Orléans
