= Hilduin III, Count of Montdidier =

French noble

Hilduin III (died after 1032), Count of Montdidier, Seigneur de Ramerupt, son of Hilduin II, Count of Arcis-sur-Aube. He was a member of the House of Montdidier. Virtually nothing is known about his life.

== Marriage and Issue ==
Hilduin married Lessaline de Dammartin, although, when widowed, she apparently married Renaud I, Count of Soissons as her second husband. Hilduin and his wife had three children:

- Hilduin IV, Count of Montdidier
- Manasses de Ramerupt
- Guilliume.

Upon his death, Hilduin III was succeeded by his son Hilduin IV as Count of Montdidier.
