= Albéric Pont =

French dentist

- Born: 1870; Bagnols-sur-Cèze, France
- Died: 1960 (aged 89–90)
- Scientific career
- Fields: dentistry

Albéric Pont (1870–1960) was a French dentist. He created a center for maxillofacial surgery during the first World War.
