= Manasses of Dammartin =

Count of Dammartin

Manasses (died 15 December 1037), Count of Dammartin (Dammartin-en-Goële), son of Hilduin II, Count of Arcis-sur-Aube and Seigneur de Ramerupt. He was a member of the House of Montdidier.

Manasses died in the battle of Ornel, near Etain, Bar-le-Duc, apparently part of an invasion of the Kingdom of Burgundy by Odo II, Count of Blois, after the death of Rudolph III, in an attempt by Odo to gain the crown of Burgundy.

Manasses married Constance, daughter of Robert II the Pious and his third wife Constance of Arles. There is some question on whether or not Constance was a child of Robert and Constance, the major proof of the issue by onomastics. They had three children:

- Odo, Count of Dammartin
- Hugh I, Count of Dammartin
- Eustachie de Dammartin

Upon his death, Manasses was succeeded as count of Dammartin by his son Odo.

== Sources ==
- Henri Moranvillé, Origine de la Maison de Ramerupt-Roucy, BEC, 1925
- Europäische Stammtafeln
