= Guy of Bar-sur-Seine =

Guy I of Bar-sur-Seine (c. 1105 - 1146) was the count of Bar-sur-Seine in the county of Champagne. He was the son of Milo II of Bar-sur-Seine and of Mathilde of Noyers.

== Biography ==
Guy became count of Bar-sur-Seine on the death of his father Milo II of Bar-sur-Seine. At his death, with his son Milo III of Bar-sur-Seine being on crusade in the Holy Land, the county of Bar-sur-Seine was administered by his wife Pétronille. Following his death, his youngest daughter Ermesinde was born.

== Marriage and issue ==
Guy married Pétronille de Chacenay, daughter of Anséric II de Chacenay and Hombeline. They had:

- Milo III of Bar-sur-Seine, succeeded his father
- William of Bar-sur-Seine, probably died young (before 1151)
- Guy de Bar-sur-Seine, probably died young (before 1151)
- Manassès de Bar-sur-Seine, succeeded his brother
- Theobald de Bar-sur-Seine, lord of Champlost, married Marguerite de Chacenay, daughter of Jacques I of Chacenay and Agnès of Brienne
- Ermesinde of Bar-sur-Seine, married Anseau II of Traînel then Theobald I, Count of Bar

== Sources ==
- Evergates, Theodore (1999). "Aristocratic Women in the County of Champagne". In Evergates, Theodore (ed.). Aristocratic Women in Medieval France. University of Pennsylvania Press.
- Perry, Guy (2018). The Briennes: The Rise and Fall of a Champenois Dynasty in the Age of the Crusades, c. 950-1356. Cambridge University Press.
