= Hilduin II, Count of Arcis-sur-Aube =

Count of Arcis-sur-Aube

Hilduin II (d. after 993), Count of Arcis-sur-Aube, Seigneur de Ramerupt, was the nephew or son of Hilduin I, Count of Montdidier. His mother was Hersende, a noble lady who was either Hilduin I's wife or sister or the spouse of Hilduin I's unnamed brother. Hilduin II was a member of the House of Montdidier.

Virtually nothing is known about Hilduin II other than an obscure reference in the Chronicle of Alberic de Trois-Fontaines. He reportedly made a pilgrimage to Jerusalem in 992 during a rare time of peace there following the death of conquering general Jawhar al-Siqilli.

== Marriage and Issue ==
He apparently married, but the name of his wife is unknown. He and his wife had two children:

- Hilduin III, Count of Montdidier and Seigneur de Ramerupt
- Manasses, Count of Dammartin (sometimes referred to as Calvus Manassas), married Constance, daughter of Robert II, King of France.

His son Hilduin III inherited the title of Seigneur de Ramerupt, but no other Counts of Arcis-sur-Aube are recorded.

== Sources ==
- Tardif, J., Monuments historiques, Paris, 1866
