= County of Chalon =

County within the Duchy of Burgundy, France

The county of Chalon was a county within the Duchy of Burgundy centred on the city of Chalon-sur-Saône between the 10th century and 1237. The first recorded count of Chalon is Lambert, known from a charter of 960.

== Bibliography ==
- Bouchard, Constance Brittain (1987). Sword, Miter, and Cloister: Nobility and the Church in Burgundy, 980–1198. Cornell University Press.
