= Roucy =

- Commune
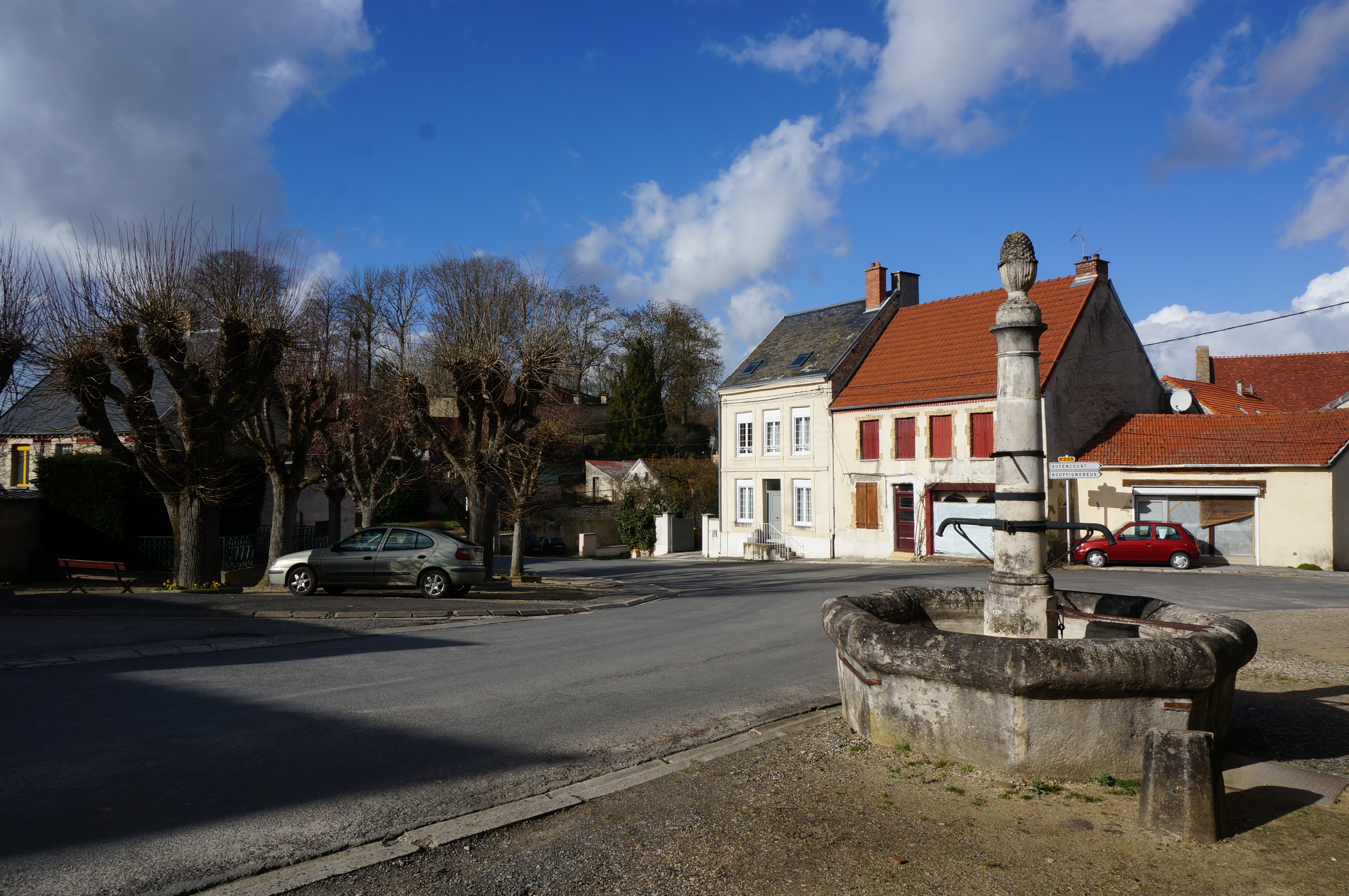
- The square in Roucy

- Coat of arms
- Location of Roucy
- Location within France Location within Hauts-de-France
- Coordinates: 49°22′22″N 3°48′57″E
- Country: France
- Region: Hauts-de-France
- Department: Aisne
- Arrondissement: Laon
- Canton: Villeneuve-sur-Aisne
- Intercommunality: Champagne Picarde

Government
  - Mayor (2026–32): Évelyne Bernard
- Area^{1}: 6.96 km^{2} (2.69 sq mi)
- Elevation: 100 m (330 ft)
- Highest elevation: 206 m (676 ft)
- Lowest elevation: 55 m (180 ft)
- Population (2023): 365
  - Density: 52.4/km^{2} (136/sq mi)
- Time zone: UTC+01:00 (CET)
  - Summer (DST): UTC+02:00 (CEST)
- INSEE/Postal code: 02656 /02160
- ^{1} French Land Register data, which excludes lakes, ponds, glaciers > 1 km^{2} (0.386 sq mi or 247 acres) and river estuaries.

Roucy (French pronunciation: [ʁusi]) is a small commune in the Aisne department in Hauts-de-France in northern France. Notable features of this town include the wide central plaza on which village fetes occur every summer.

== Population ==
Historical population
| Year | Pop. | ±% p.a. |
|---|---|---|
| 1968 | 223 | — |
| 1975 | 249 | +1.59% |
| 1982 | 293 | +2.35% |
| 1990 | 281 | −0.52% |
| 1999 | 329 | +1.77% |
| 2007 | 400 | +2.47% |
| 2012 | 390 | −0.51% |
| 2017 | 394 | +0.20% |
| 2023 | 365 | −1.27% |
Source: INSEE

== See also ==
- Communes of the Aisne department
