= Hilduin IV, Count of Montdidier =

Hilduin IV

Count of Roucy
- Reign: 1033–1063
- Predecessor: Ebles I of Roucy
- Successor: Ebles II of Roucy
- Died: 1063
- Spouse: Adelaide (Alice) of Roucy
- Issue: Ebles II of Roucy; Andre de Ramerupt; Beatrix de Roucy; Marguerite de Roucy; Ermentrude de Roucy; Ada de Roucy; Adélaïs de Roucy; Aelis de Roucy; Felicia of Roucy
- Dynasty: House of Montdidier
- Father: Hilduin III of Montdidier

Hilduin IV (d. 1063), Count of Montdidier and Lord of Ramerupt, son of Hilduin III, Count of Montdidier, member of the House of Montdidier. Hilduin was also Count of Roucy by virtue of his marriage to the daughter of Ebles I, Count of Roucy.

Little is known about Hilduin despite his many renowned children and grandchildren. Hériman of Tournai records that Philip I of France appointed Hilduin as an ambassador to Rome (date unknown).

Sometime between 1033 and 1054, probably closer to the latter, Hilduin was driven from Montdidier by Count Ralph IV of Valois, who continued to rule it until his death in 1074.

Hilduin married Adelaide (Alice) de Roucy, daughter of Ebles I, Count of Roucy, and Beatrix of Hainaut. They had:

- Ebles II, Count of Roucy, married Sibylle de Apulia, daughter of Robert Guiscard, Duke of Apulia and Sichelgaita de Salerno
- Andre (d. after 1118), Seigneur de Ramerupt and of Arcis-sur-Aube, married Guisemode, widow of Hugh, Siegneur of Pleurs. Their son Eble de Roucy was Bishop of Châlons (1122-1127) and daughter Alix married Erard I, Count of Brienne.
- Beatrix de Ramerupt (d. after 1129), married Geoffrey II, Count of Perche
- Marguerite de Ramerupt, married Hugh, Count of Clermont-en-Beauvaisis
- Ermentrude de Ramerupt (d. after 1102), married Thibaut, Count of Reynel, son of Olri, Count of Reynel.
- Ada de Ramerupt (d. after 1121), married first Geoffroy, Seigneur de Guise, and second Gauthier, Seigneur de Ath
- Adélaïs, married Arnold I, Count of Chiny
- Aelis de Ramerupt, married Conan “Falcon” de la Sarraz. Their son was Barthélemy de Jur, Bishop of Laon.
- Felicia of Roucy, married Sancho I, King of Aragon.

Hilduin was apparently the last Count of Montdidier, the line being continued with the Counts of Roucy.

== Sources ==
- Beauvillé, Victor de (1857). Histoire de la ville de Montdidier. Vol. 1. Paris: Firmin Didot.
- Guenée, Bernard (May–June 1978). "Les généalogies entre l'histoire et la politique: la fierté d'être Capétien, en France, au Moyen Age". Annales: Histoire, Sciences Sociales. 33 (3): 450–477. doi:10.3406/ahess.1978.293943.
- Hermann Monacii of Laon, From the Miracles of Mary (Hermanni Laudunensis Monacii de Miraculis B. Mariæ Laudunensis), RHGF XI
- Morton, Catherine, and Muntz, Hope (editors). The Carmen de Hastingae Proelio of Bishop Guy of Amiens, Oxford at the Clarendon Press, 1972
