= Adalbert of Italy =

King of Italy from 950 until 961

Adalbert
- Adalbert depicted in a 12th-century manuscript

King of Italy
- Reign: 950–961
- Predecessor: Lothair II
- Successor: Otto I
- Born: c. 932/936
- Died: c. 971/975; Autun, Burgundy
- Spouse: Gerberga
- Issue: Otto-William, Count of Burgundy
- House: Anscarids
- Father: Berengar II of Italy
- Mother: Willa of Tuscany

Adalbert I (born 932/936, died 971/975) was the king of Italy from 950 until 961, ruling jointly with his father, Berengar II. After their deposition, Adalbert I continued to claim the Italian kingdom until his defeat in battle by the forces of Otto I in 965. Since he was the second Adalbert in his family, the Anscarids, he is sometimes numbered Adalbert II. His name is occasionally, especially in older works, shortened to Albert.

== Accession ==
Adalbert I was born between 932 and 936, the son of Berengar II, then margrave of Ivrea, and Willa, daughter of Boso, margrave of Tuscany. In 950, he and his father were simultaneously elected by the high nobility to succeed King Lothar II of Italy. They were crowned together in the basilica of Saint Michael in Pavia on 15 December. Berengar II tried to force Lothair's widow, Adelaide, to marry Adalbert I and cement their claim to joint kingship. Although later traditions speak of a marriage, Adelaide refused to be married and fled to Canossa. She was tracked down and imprisoned for four months at Como.

== German invasion ==
In 951, King Otto I of Germany invaded Italy, forcing the release of Adelaide and marrying her himself. He made no effort to depose the kings of Italy, however. Instead, Adalbert I and Berengar II were compelled to attend the Diet of Augsburg in Germany in August 952, where Otto formally invested them with the kingdom of Italy, thus subjecting the kingdom to Germany. Between 953 and 956, Adalbert I and Berengar II besieged Count Adalbert Azzo of Canossa in his castle, where Adelaide had taken refuge in 951. In 956, Duke Liudolf of Swabia, Otto's son, entered Italy with a large army to re-assert his father's authority. Adalbert I gathered a large force to oppose him. He defeated Liudolf, but before the latter could return to Germany, he died in September 957. Following this victory, Adalbert I, assisted by Duke Hugh of Tuscany, campaigned against Duke Theobald II of Spoleto. During this campaign his forces even encroached on Roman territory in 960.

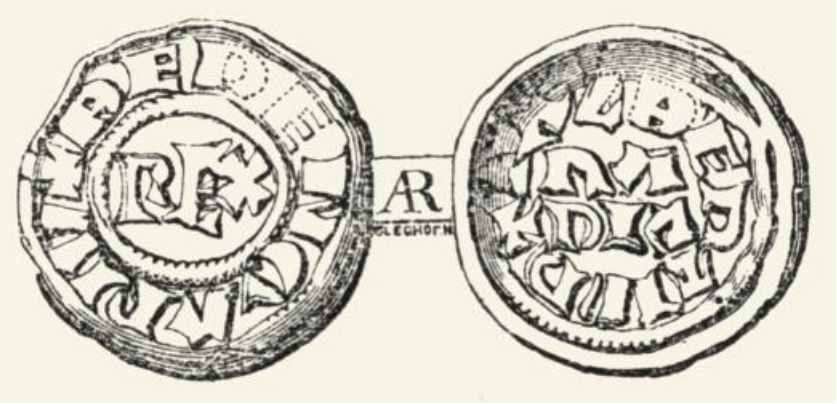
A silver denarius issued by Berengar (who is named on the obverse) and Adalbert (who is named on the reverse). The reverse reads Papia for Pavia.

Pope John XII asked the king of Germany for help against Adalbert I. Otto entered Italy in 961, while Adalbert I assembled a large army at Verona. According to contemporary sources it was 60,000 strong, although this is an obvious exaggeration. Many of the leading noble families refused to join in the defense of Italy except on the condition that Berengar II abdicate in favor of his son. This the elder king refused to do, and thus Adalbert I was unable to effectively oppose the German invasion. Otto proceeded unopposed to Milan, where he was crowned king by Archbishop Walbert in November, and from there to Rome, where he was crowned emperor by the pope on 3 February 962. Adalbert I and Berengar II went into hiding.

== Exile ==
After his imperial coronation, Otto besieged the various fortresses loyal to Adalbert I and Berengar II. In the fall of 962, Adalbert I left Italy and took refuge with the Arabs of Fraxinetum in southern Burgundy. From there he went to Corsica. From Corsica he opened negotiations with John XII, proposing a joint action against Otto. He sailed to Italy, landing in Civitavecchia. There he was met by the pope's representatives, who escorted him to Rome. Otto, who had forced Berengar II to surrender, then marched against Rome. After a perfunctory defense, Adalbert I and the pope fled.

Adalbert I returned to Corsica in his second exile. He did not try to regain Italy again until after Otto had returned north of the Alps. When he finally returned in 965, he tried to take Pavia, the Italian capital, but was defeated by another Swabian army, this time under Duke Burchard III. On 25 June, Burchard defeated him in battle between Parma and Piacenza. Fighting alongside Adalbert I were his brothers: Conrad, count of Milan, who had initially made his peace with Otto, and Guy, margrave of Ivrea, who died in the fighting.

Failing in his second attempt to regain his kingdom, Adalbert began a long series of negotiations with the Byzantine Empire, which was threatened by Otto's designs on southern Italy. When these fell through, he retired with his wife Gerberga to her family's estates in Burgundy. Adalbert died at Autun, either on 30 April 971 or between 972 and 975. From his marriage, Adalbert I had one son, Otto-William, born at the latest in 962 (the marriage must have been contracted before), who succeeded to the county of Mâcon through marriage to the widow of the previous count. This has led some scholars to mistakenly conclude that Gerberga must have been related to the counts of Mâcon. After Adalbert I's death, Gerberga married Henry I, Duke of Burgundy. Henry adopted Otto-William making him a possible heir of the Duchy of Burgundy. Otto-William was even offered the Italian crown after the death of Arduin in 1015, although he did not accept.

Sixteen diplomas issued jointly with his father and three issued by himself alone have survived from Adalbert I's reign. They have been edited and published. Berengar II and Adalbert I had silver denarii minted at Pavia.

Regnal titles
Preceded by Lothair II	King of Italy; 950–961	Succeeded by Otto I
