= Hugh I of Dammartin =

Count of Dammartin

Hugh I (died after 1093), Count of Dammartin and Seigneur de Bulles, son of Manasses, Count of Dammartin, and Constance of France. Hugh's maternal grandfather was Robert the Pious, King of France, and his paternal great-grandfather was Hilduin I, Count of Montdidier.

Hugh married Rohese, sister of Ascelin, Seigneur de Bulles, and they had four children:

- Pierre, Count of Dammartin (d. 1106)
- Basilie, founder of the Priory of Saint-Leu d’Esserent
- Adela (d. after 1167), married first Aubry de Mello (eventually, Count of Dammartin) and second Lancelin II de Beauvais (d. after 1116), Seigneur de Bulles, son of Lancelin I de Beauvais.
- Eustachie de Dammartin.

Hugh was succeeded as Count of Dammartin by his son Pierre.

== Sources ==
- Mathieu, J. N., Recherches sur les premiers Comtes de Dammartin, Mémoires publiés par la Fédération des sociétés historiques et archéologiques de Paris et de l'Ile-de-France, 1996
