= Otto-William of Burgundy =

Count of Burgundy from 982 to 1026 and a duke of Burgundy

Otto-William
- The count's coin
- Born: c. 958
- Died: 21 September 1026
- Spouse: Ermentrude of Roucy; Adelaide
- Issue: Guy; Matilda; Gerberga; Reginald I, Count of Burgundy; Agnes
- House: Ivrea
- Father: Adalbert of Ivrea
- Mother: Gerberga

Otto-William (French: Otte-Guillaume; German: Otto Wilhelm; c. 958 – 21 September 1026) was count of Mâcon, Nevers, and Burgundy.

== Life ==
Otto was born cca. 958 during the joint reign of his grandfather, King Berengar II of Italy, and his father, King Adalbert. His mother was Gerberga.

After Adalbert's death in 971/5, Gerberga married for a second time, to Henry I, Duke of Burgundy, the younger brother of King Hugh Capet. Gerberga and Henry had no children together. Since Henry had no legitimate son of his own, he adopted Otto-William making him a possible heir of the Duchy of Burgundy.

While the son of a king, Otto did not seek a royal wife. In c. 982, he married Ermentrude of Roucy, whose maternal grandmother, Gerberga of Saxony, was a sister of Otto I, Holy Roman Emperor, and by this marriage alliance created a web of consanguinity between later kings of France, Germany, Burgundy and the Carolingians. Even Otto's children's spouses, although from great families, came from widespread and scattered parts of France.

This marriage brought to Otto-William the County of Mâcon as well as many other rights on the left bank of the Saône in the province of Besançon. The new Count of Mâcon consolidated there his political grip making what would be later be the Free County of Burgundy around Dole.

From his mother Otto could have inherited the County of Nevers before 990. However he left Nevers to his stepson Landric and rather claimed the County of Beaune in which the dowry of Gerberga was.

The Duchy of Burgundy was eventually annexed to the crown of France by King Robert II, nephew of Henry I, Duke of Burgundy, in 1005.

On the left-bank of the Saône, determined to be sovereign ruler of his own lands, Otto revolted against the Emperor Henry II in 1016. This was after Rudolph III of Burgundy, the last king of Burgundy and Arles, had done homage to Henry at Strasbourg, making him his guard and heir. On Otto's death, the Free County fell under the suzerainty of the German emperors.

Otto died on 21 September 1026 at the age of 64 and was buried in St-Benigne of Dijon.

== Marriages and issue ==
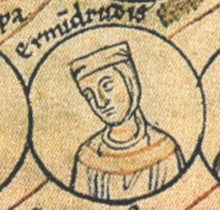
Otto-William's first wife Ermentrude

Otto's first wife was Ermentrude of Roucy. She bore Otto's issue:

- Guy (c. 982–1006) had been associated as count of Mâcon from 995.
- Matilda, married Landri of Nevers, Count of Nevers.
- Gerberga, married William II, Count of Provence.
- Reginald I, Count of Burgundy (c. 990–1057). He was married to Alice of Normandy.
- Agnes of Burgundy, Duchess of Aquitaine

Otto remarried late in life to a wife named Adelaide. Some scholars have identified her as the four-times widowed Adelaide-Blanche of Anjou, but the identity is not directly attested and has been disputed by some studying the question.

== See also ==
- Dukes of Burgundy family tree

== Sources ==
- Bouchard, Constance Brittain (1987). Sword, Miter, and Cloister:Nobility and Church in Burgundy, 980-1198. Cornell University Press.
- Fawtier, Robert (1989). Capetian Kings of France: Monarchy and Nation, 987-1328. Translated by Butler, Lionel; Adam, R.J. Macmillan.101
- Previte Orton, C. W. (2013). The Early History of the House of Savoy, 1000-1233. Cambridge University Press.
- Stasser, Thierry (1997). "Adélaïde d'Anjou, sa famille, ses unions, sa descendance - Etat de las question". Le Moyen Âge: Revue d'histoire et de philologie. 103. De Boeck Supérieur: 9–52.

Otto-William of Burgundy House of Ivrea Died: 21 September 1026
Regnal titles
Preceded by Odo Henry	Duke of Burgundy; 1002–1004	Succeeded by Robert the Pious
New title	Count of Burgundy; 982–1026	Succeeded by Reginald I
