= Manasses III of Rethel =

Count of Rethel

Manasses III, Count of Rethel
- Born: 1022
- Died: 1065 or 1080
- Noble family: de Rethel
- Spouse: Judith
- Issue: Hugh I, Count of Rethel
- Father: Manasses II, Count of Rethel
- Mother: Dada

Manasses III, Count of Rethel (1022 – 1065 or 1080) was a son of Manasses II and his wife Dada (possibly Judith or Yvette de Roucy). He succeeded his father as Count of Rethel in 1032.

Little is known about his life, although he is mentioned often between 1048 and 1081.

== Marriage and descendants ==
Manasses III married Judith (born c. 1035), whose origins are unclear. Several hypotheses have been proposed to clarify this:

- Judith of Roucy : Genealogiae scriptoris Fusniacensis cites an Iveta (Yvette), wife of Manasses de Rethel, as the sister of Ebles I of Roucy and Liétaud de Marle. The Chronicles of Alberic of Trois-Fontaine (written in 1119) describes her as "mother of Hugh I, Count of Rethel". This is the traditional genealogy given for her grandson, Baldwin II of Jerusalem. Notwithstanding, considering her family history, such assertion is chronologically impossible. Jean-Nöel Mathieu raises the fundamental objection that Eble I (who died in 1033), could not have had a sister who was still alive in 1081, instead he argues that she must have been confused with the wife of Manasses II. The historian Alan V. Murray remarks that Mathieu's suggestion 'would fit the chronology of the Roucy family better since it would place the connection with the Rethel family one generation earlier than that given by the genealogies of Foigny';
- Judith of Boulogne: daughter of Eustace I, Count of Boulogne and Mathilda of Leuven: this proposition would explain the kinship between the kings Baldwin I and Baldwin II of Jerusalem. However, Murray objects that there is no allusion of this daughter nor of any other connection between the Rethel and Boulogne families in Genealogica comitum Boloniensium', a compilation of the Boulogne genealogy which was being copied and extended by the mid-twelfth century, when the descendants of Manasses III were ruling the kingdom of Jerusalem. Another hypothesis is that Doda, the wife of Godfrey III, Duke of Lower Lorraine, would have been the daughter of Manasses II and Dada (Yvette) de Roucy;
- Judith of Lorraine: Li Estoire de Jerusalem et d'Antioche, written in the 12th century, indicates that Manasses III was married to a daughter of Godfrey III. This would also explain the connection between the two Baldwins of Jerusalem, as well as the fact that Godfrey made a donation to Manasses in 1065. Murray says that the primary sources suggest that kinship between Baldwin I and Baldwin II "was not particularly close", and that Baldwin II was most probably related to his predecessor's mother, Ida of Lorraine.

Judith and Manasses were the parents of:

- perhaps Renaud, if this son existed he probably died between 1066 and 1081.
- Hugh I (d. 1118)
- Manasses
- Judith

Manasses III of Rethel Born: 1022 Died: 1065 or 1080
Preceded by Manasses II	Count of Rethel; 1032–1065	Succeeded by Hugh I
