= Alberic III of Dammartin =

Count of Dammartin

- Born: c. 1138; Dammartin
- Died: 19 September 1200; Lillebonne
- Buried: Jumièges Abbey
- Noble family: Dammartin
- Spouse: Mathilde
- Issue: Renaud I, Count of Dammartin; Alix de Dammartin; Simon of Dammartin; Julia of Dammartin; Agnes of Dammartin
- Father: Alberic II Count of Dammartin
- Mother: Clémence de Bar

Alberic III of Dammartin (Aubry de Dammartin) (c. 1138 – 19 September 1200) was a French count and son of Alberic II, Count of Dammartin, and Clémence de Bar, daughter of Reginald I, Count of Bar.

He married Mathilde, heiress to the county of Clermont and daughter of Renaud II, Count of Clermont. They had:

- Renaud I, Count of Dammartin (c. 1165–1227), married 1) Marie de Châtillon and 2) Ide de Lorraine with whom he had Matilda II, Countess of Boulogne, Queen of Portugal
- Alix de Dammartin (1170–1237), married Jean, Châtelain de Trie
- Simon of Dammartin (1180 – 21 September 1239), married Marie, Countess of Ponthieu father of Joan, Countess of Ponthieu, Queen of Castile and Leon.
- Julia of Dammartin, married Hugh de Gournay
- Agnes of Dammartin, married William de Fiennes (Note: Parsons shows Agnes married a Fiennes, no first name given.)

== Sources ==
- Grant, Lindy (2005). Architecture and society in Normandy 1120-1270. Yale University Press.
- Parsons, John Carmi (1977). The Court and Household of Eleanor of Castile in 1290. Pontifical Institute of Mediaeval Studies.
