= Henry I of Burgundy =

Duke of Burgundy from 965 to 1002

Otto-Henry

Duke of Burgundy
- Reign: 965 – 15 October 1002
- Predecessor: Otto
- Successor: Otto-William
- Born: c. 946
- Died: 15 October 1002
- Spouse: Gerberga (m. 972); Gersenda of Gascony (before June 992)
- Issue: Odo, Viscount of Beaune
- Father: Hugh the Great
- Mother: Hedwig of Saxony

Henry I (946 – 15 October 1002), called the Great, (Note: His nickname, Latin magnus, originally meant "the elder", and distinguished him from Duke Henry II.) was Duke of Burgundy from 965 to his death and Count of Nevers through his first marriage. He is sometimes known as Odo-Henry or Otto-Henry (in French Eudes-Henri), since his birth name was "Odo" and he only adopted "Henry" on being elected duke of Burgundy.

== Life ==
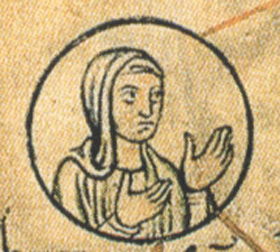
Henry’s mother, Hedwig of Saxony

He was a younger son of Hugh the Great, Duke of the Franks, and Hedwig of Saxony and thus the younger brother of King Hugh Capet. As Odo, he entered the church at a young age and was a cleric at the time of the death of his brother Otto, Duke of Burgundy, on 22 February 965. He was elected by the Burgundian counts to succeed his brother and they gave him the name Henry. However Otto-Henry only held three counties of his own, his vassals holding the remaining six that comprised the core of that held by Richard the Justiciar who died in 921.

In 978, Henry participated in the invasion of Lotharingia and the defence of Paris from a counter-raid.

In 972, he married Gerberga, the widow of Adalbert II of Italy, who had sought refuge at Autun. Through Gerberga, he had a stepson named Otto-William. This marriage allowed Henry to rule the County of Nevers.

He married a second time to Gersenda, daughter of William II of Gascony. As Henry had no child, Otto-William became a legitimate contender to inherit the Duchy of Burgundy. So did Henry's nephew, the king Robert II of France. This resulted in a war of succession (from 1003 to 1005) between Otto-William and Robert II. Otto-William eventually gave up the Duchy but kept in the Western Frankish Kingdom, the county of Mâcon, the county of Beaune and the advowson for the abbey of St-Benigne in Dijon.

== Family ==
Henry died without any sons of his own two wives. He adopted his step-son Otto-William making him a possible heir of the Duchy of Burgundy.

Odo-Henry had at least one illegitimate child by an unknown mother:

- Odo of Beaune († after August 25, 1005), viscount of Beaune.

== Notes ==
Preceded by Otto	Duke of Burgundy	Succeeded by Otto-William
