= 1060s =

Decade

The 1060s was a decade of the Julian Calendar which began on January 1, 1060, and ended on December 31, 1069.

== Events ==
=== By place ===
==== Europe ====
- August 4 – King Henry I of France (of the House of Capet) dies after a 29-year reign in Vitry-aux-Loges. He is succeeded by his 8-year-old son Philip I ("the Amorous") as king of France. Philip is too young to rule, and his mother, Queen Anne of Kiev becomes regent. France is administered by Count Baldwin V (one of Philip's uncles) who acts as co-regent.
- Summer – Norman forces under Duke Robert Guiscard invade Apulia, and capture the cities of Taranto and Brindisi (under control of the Byzantine Empire). Guiscard prepares a Sicilian expedition against the Saracens and returns to Calabria (Southern Italy), where his brother Roger Bosso waits with siege engines.
- December 6 – Béla I ("the Champion") is crowned king of Hungary after his nephew, Solomon is deprived of the crown. He is supported by Duke Bolesław II the Generous – who helps him (with Polish troops) to obtain the Hungarian throne.

==== China ====
- The compilation of the New Book of Tang is completed, under a team of scholars led by Ouyang Xiu.

==== Middle East ====
- August 30 — The Mirdasids under Mahmud ibn Nasr defeat the Fatimid Caliphate's army under Nasir al-Dawla Ibn Hamdan at the Battle of al-Funaydiq, leading to the definitive loss of Aleppo for the Fatimids.

=== By topic ===
==== Religion ====
- Anselm enters the Benedictine Bec Abbey in Normandy, as a novice (approximate date).

=== By place ===
==== Europe ====
- Spring – Robert de Grandmesnil, his nephew Berengar, half-sister Judith (future wife of Roger I), and eleven monks of the Abbey of Saint-Evroul, are banished by Duke William II ("the Bastard") of Normandy for violence, and travel to Southern Italy.
- Summer – Norman forces led by Duke Robert Guiscard and his brother Roger I invade Sicily. They land unseen during the night and surprise the Saracen army. Guiscard conquers Messina and marches into central Sicily.
- June 28 – Count Floris I is ambushed on a retreat from Zaltbommel and killed by German troops at Nederhemert. Most of West Frisia (later part of the County of Holland) is conquered and annexed by the Holy Roman Empire.
- Sosols (a tribe in Estonia) destroy the Kievan Rus' fortification of Yuryev in Tartu, and carry out a raid on Pskov.

==== Africa ====
- Abu Bakr ibn Umar of Almoravids, appoints Yusuf ibn Tashfin as steward of Sous and northern provinces, while campaigning in the southern provinces. Upon his return, daunted by Yusuf's new-found power, Abu Bakr sees any attempts at recapturing his post as politically unfeasible and returns to the fringes of the Sahara to settle the unrest of the southern frontier.

=== By topic ===
==== Religion ====
- July 27 – Pope Nicholas II dies after a 2-year pontificate at Florence. He is succeeded by Alexander II as the 156th pope of the Catholic Church in Rome.
- The Speyer Cathedral is consecrated in Speyer (modern Germany).

=== By place ===
==== Europe ====
- Spring – Coup of Kaiserswerth: The 11-year-old King Henry IV is abducted, as a result of a conspiracy of German nobles led by Anno II, archbishop of Cologne. Henry's education and training is supervised by Anno, who acts as his regent and is called his magister (his "master" or "teacher"). Empress Agnes of Poitou (Henry's mother) resigns the throne, and Anno with the archbishops Siegfried I and Adalbert of Hamburg takes her place.

==== Britain ====
- Winter – Harold Godwinson leads a successful campaign against King Gruffydd ap Llywelyn. He attacks and captures Rhuddlan Castle in northern Wales, but Gruffydd manages to escape.

==== Africa ====
- The Almoravids overrun modern-day Morocco, and establish an intercontinental kingdom, stretching from Spain to Senegal.
- The Banu Khurasan, a vassal of the Hammdid Dynasty, begin to rule the north of Ifriqiya (modern Tunisia).
- Marrakesh is founded by the Almoravids which becomes their capital.

=== By topic ===
==== Religion ====
- Affligem Abbey, of the Order of St. Benedict, is founded in Affligem (modern Belgium).

=== By place ===
==== Europe ====
- May 8 – Battle of Graus: Allied Muslim and Christian troops, under King Sancho II (the Strong) and Emir Ahmad al-Muqtadir (maybe led by El Cid), defeat the Aragonese army. King Ramiro I is killed and succeeded by his son Sancho V, as ruler of Aragon.
- Battle of Cerami: Duke Roger I leads a small Norman force (supported by 136 mounted knights), and defeats a much larger Saracen army (35,000 men) at Cerami (near Troina) in Sicily.
- Summer – The Pisan fleet assaults and sacks Palermo (controlled by the Saracens) – this in support of the Norman forces of Roger I.
- August–September: The Holy Roman Empire invades Hungary and installs Solomon as their proxy ruler.
- Duke William I (the Bastard) claims the province of Maine and betroths his son Robert to Margaret, daughter of late Count Herbert II.

==== Seljuk Empire ====
- Battle of Damghan: Seljuk forces under Alp Arslan defeat his brother Qutalmish who claims the throne of late Tughril, founder of the Seljuk Empire. Qutalmish flees from the battle, but his son Suleiman is taken prisoner.

=== By topic ===
==== Architecture ====
- The Pizhi Pagoda located at Lingyan Temple (Shandong province) in China is completed, standing at a height of 54 m (177 ft) tall.
- Doge Domenico I orders the construction of the present building of St Mark's Basilica at Venice (approximate date).

==== Religion ====
- Anselm, later to become archbishop of Canterbury, becomes prior at the Abbey of Bec (approximate date).
- The bishopric of Olomouc (located on the River Morava) is founded (modern Czech Republic).

=== By place ===
==== Europe ====
- Summer – King Ferdinand I (the Great) conquers more territory in modern-day Portugal and captures Coimbra. He appoints Sisnando Davides to reorganise the economy and administer the lands encircling the city.
- European warriors go to Spain, to participate in the siege of Barbastro. This expedition is sanctioned by Pope Alexander II – and is now regarded as an early form of Crusade.
- Harold Godwinson, Earl of Wessex, is shipwrecked on the shores of Ponthieu (Normandy). He is captured by Count Guy I who takes him as hostage to his castle of Beaurian.
- Duke William I (the Bastard) demands the release of Harold Godwinson from Guy I (after a ransom being paid). Harold must swear an oath to aid William to the throne of England.
- Kings Harald Hardrada of Norway and Sweyn II of Denmark agree to a peace agreement. Harald turns his attentions to England where he believes he has a right to the throne.

==== Seljuk Empire ====
- April 27 – Alp Arslan succeeds to the throne, as sultan of the Seljuk Empire. He becomes sole ruler of Persia from the river Oxus to the Tigris.
- The Seljuk Turks under Alp Arslan invade Anatolia, and capture Ani after a siege of 25-days. He sacks the city and slaughters its citizens.
- Badr al-Jamali, Fatimid governor of Syria, tries to engineer a pro-Fatimid coup in Aleppo; but the rebellion is suppressed by Musa Yabgu.

==== Asia ====
- King Bagrat IV of Georgia captures the fortress city of Samshvilde, the capital of the neighboring Tashir-Dzoraget.

==== Mesoamerica ====
- January 4 – The Aztecs migrate from Aztlán to the southern lands in central Mexico.

=== By topic ===
==== Religion ====
- Winter – Great German Pilgrimage: Archbishop Siegfried I of Mainz leads a pilgrimage to Jerusalem. Either during this pilgrimage or shortly before it, the Ezzolied; a High German poem on the life of Christ, is composed.
- Michaelsberg Abbey at Siegburg (modern Germany) is founded by Anno II, archbishop of Cologne.
- Construction of the Piazza dei Miracoli (known as Piazza del Duomo) at Pisa in Tuscany begins.

==== Volcanology ====
- Sunset Crater Volcano (modern-day Arizona) first erupts (approximate date)

=== By place ===
==== Europe ====
- December 24 – King Ferdinand I of León ("the Great") dies in León, Spain, after an 11-year reign as Emperor of All Spain. His kingdom is divided among his three sons: the eldest Sancho II, the second Alfonso VI and the youngest García II. The kingdoms of Galicia and Portugal become independent under the rule of García.

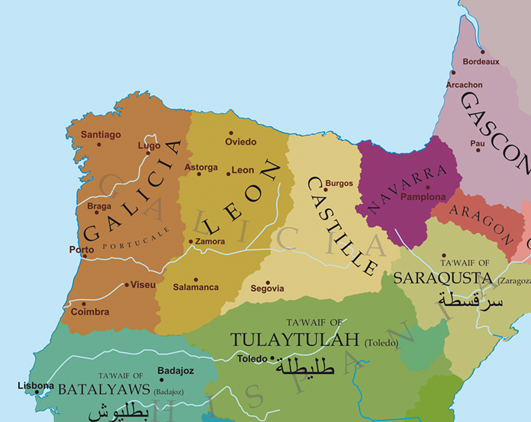
Political situation in the Northern Iberian Peninsula around 1065: Garcia II's domains (Galicia) Badajoz, owing tribute to Garcia Seville, owing tribute to Garcia Alfonso VI's domains (León) Toledo, owing tribute to Alfonso Sancho II's domains (Castile) Zaragoza, owing tribute to Sancho

==== England ====
- October 3 – Northumbria revolts against Tostig Godwinson, who is exiled. He takes refuge with his brother-in-law, Count Baldwin V in Flanders (modern Belgium). The Northumbrian nobles choose Morcar (or Morkere) as earl at York.
- December 28 – Westminster Abbey is consecrated by King Edward the Confessor.

==== Seljuk Empire ====
- Alp Arslan, leader of the Seljuk Turks, campaigns against the Kipchaks and the Türkmen in Central Asia. He captures the city of Kars and plunders the western provinces of Georgia.

==== China ====
- Sima Guang, chancellor of the Song dynasty, heads a team of scholars in initiating the compilation of an enormous written universal history of China, known as the Zizhi Tongjian.

=== By topic ===
==== Religion ====
- Great German Pilgrimage of 1064–65: A large pilgrimage led by Siegfried I (archbishop of Mainz) arrives in Jerusalem after having been attacked by Bedouin bandits. Two weeks later (in April) they return to Ramla and take ships back to Latakia.
- Gregory II the Martyrophile is consecrated as catholicos of the Armenian church in Tzamandos

==== Astronomy ====
- A "guest star" (i.e. a nova of some kind) is observed from China. It may be related to the Strottner-Drechsler Object 20 nebula.

=== Worldwide ===
- March 20 – Halley's Comet reaches perihelion. Its appearance is subsequently recorded in the Bayeux Tapestry.

==== Africa ====
- Egyptian military commander Abu Sa'd Mansur ibn Zunbur known as al-sayyid, al-afḍal appointed Vizier in Egypt.

=== Asia ===
- unknown dates
  - Chinese imperial official Sima Guang presents the emperor with an eight-volume Tongzhi (通志; "Comprehensive Records"), chronicling Chinese history from 403 BCE to the end of the Qin dynasty in 207 BCE. The emperor then issues an edict for the compilation of Guang's universal history of China, allocating funds for the costs of compilation and research assistants such as Liu Ban, Liu Shu and Fan Zuyu.
  - The Abu Hanifa Mosque is established in Baghdad, when the Grand Vizier of the Seljuk Empire, Abu Saad al-Khwarizmi or al-Mustawfi, builds a shrine for Abu Hanifa near his tomb.

=== Europe ===
- June–November – Obodrite revolt
- September 12 – William, Duke of Normandy, assembles a fleet (around 700 warships) at Saint-Valery-sur-Somme, in readiness for an invasion of England.
- December 30 – Granada massacre: A Muslim mob storms the royal palace in Granada, crucifies the Jewish vizier Yusuf ibn Naghrela, and massacres most of the Jewish population.
- Huy becomes the first town in the Low Countries to be granted city rights, by Theodwin of Liège.
- Hedeby (located on the Jutland Peninsula) is sacked and burned by the West Slavs, after which it is slowly abandoned.
- The Republic of Genoa, jealous of the recent successes of its former allies, launches a naval assault on the Republic of Pisa.
- King Stenkil (or Steinkell) dies after a 6-year reign. Two rivals named Eric battle for power in Sweden, both claiming the throne.
- Magnus II (Haraldsson), a son of Harald Hardrada, is crowned king of Norway. He unites Western Norway and Northern Norway.
- Fulk IV, Count of Anjou, known as "the Quarreller", is at war with his brother Geoffrey III, contesting the lands of Anjou and Touraine left to them by their uncle Geoffrey II, Count of Anjou (Martel).
- City of Šibenik first mentioned under its present name in a Charter of the Croatian King Petar Krešimir IV

==== England and Scotland ====
- January – Harold Godwinson marries Ealdgyth, daughter of Ælfgar (earl of Mercia), and widow of King Gruffydd ap Llywelyn.
- January 5 – Edward the Confessor dies after a 24-year reign at London. The Witenagemot (or Witan) proclaims Harold Godwinson king of England.
- January 6 – Harold Godwinson (now known as Harold II) is crowned king of England, probably in the new Westminster Abbey, where Edward the Confessor's funeral took place not long before the coronation.
- September 18 – Harald Hardrada of Norway lands on the beaches of Scarborough, North Yorkshire and begins his invasion of England.
- September 20 – Battle of Fulford: Norwegian forces under Harald Hardrada defeat the English earls Edwin and Morcar.
- September 25 – Battle of Stamford Bridge: Harold II defeats the forces of Harald Hardrada and his own brother Tostig Godwinson.
- September 27 – William, Duke of Normandy and his army set sail from the mouth of the River Somme, beginning the Norman conquest of England. The following day he lands on the English coast at Pevensey, splits his forces, and sails with the main army to Hastings.
- October 6 – Harold II marches south from Stamford Bridge (near York) to counter the threat of the invasion by William. Reaching London within five days, he leaves a short time later. After a two-day march he and his army reach Caldbec Hill.
- October 14 – Battle of Hastings: William and Harold II meet in battle at Hastings. Although Harold has the superior position on the battlefield, he is defeated and killed by William, invading England.
- October 15 – Edgar Ætheling is proclaimed king of England (but is never crowned). He is soon forced to submit to the rule of William the Conqueror.
- December – William the Conqueror moves along the south coast to Dover, and builds fortifications in the existing castle at the top of the cliffs. He moves to Canterbury and finally enters London. Archbishop Stigand and other English leaders submit to William's rule. On December 25, he is crowned as King William I of England in Westminster Abbey over Edward the Confessor's grave.
- unknown date – Tain becomes the first town in Scotland to be chartered as a royal burgh by King Malcolm III (Canmore).

=== By place ===
==== Byzantine Empire ====
- May 22 – Emperor Constantine X dies after a 7-year reign at Constantinople. His wife, Empress Eudocia Macrembolitissa, is crowned Augusta and becomes co-regent for her two sons (Michael VII and Konstantios) along with Constantine's brother John Doukas, who rules as Caesar of the Byzantine Empire.

==== Seljuk Empire ====
- Spring – The Seljuk Turks make incursions into Mesopotamia, Cilicia and Cappadocia. They sack the Byzantine city of Caesarea, move south through the Cilician Gates and raid the region around Antioch in Syria.

==== Europe ====
- March 3 – Battle on the Nemiga River: The three sons of Grand Prince Yaroslav I (the Wise) – Iziaslav I, Sviatoslav II, and Vsevolod I – defeat the forces under Vseslav of Polotsk.
- Eric and Eric, two pretenders to the Swedish throne, are both killed during the struggle for power in Sweden. Halsten, son of the late King Stenkil, becomes the new ruler.
- Olaf III returns to Norway with the remaining troops from the Battle of Stamford Bridge. He is proclaimed king and co-ruler with his older brother Magnus II (Haraldsson).
- Wartburg Castle (near Eisenach) is founded by Louis the Springer, count of Thuringia (modern Germany).
- Minsk and Orsha are first mentioned in the chronicles, making them two of the oldest cities in Belarus.

==== England ====
- Spring – King William I (the Conqueror) returns to Normandy and takes with him Edgar Ætheling (grandson of Edmund Ironside), Archbishop Stigand, and the brothers Morcar and Edwin.
- Odo of Bayeux, a half-brother of William I, is appointed Earl of Kent and becomes William's deputy (or de facto regent) in England. His wealth and land become considerable.
- Eustace II, count of Boulogne, supports the Kentishmen in an attempt to seize Dover Castle. The conspiracy fails, and Eustace is sentenced to forfeit his English fiefs.
- Winter – William I marches on Exeter, which he besieges. The city holds out for 18 days, and after its fall William builds Rougemont Castle there to secure the region.
- Winchester Castle in Hampshire is founded by William I; it is later one of the seats of government of the Norman kings ruling England.

==== China ====
- January 25 – Emperor Yingzong (or Zhao Shu) of the Song dynasty dies after a 4-year reign. He is succeeded by his 18-year-old son Shen Zong as emperor of China.

=== By topic ===
==== Religion ====
- December 6 – A fire, the second in as many years, heavily damages Canterbury Cathedral in England.

=== By place ===
==== Byzantine Empire ====
- January 1 – Empress Eudokia Makrembolitissa, wife of the late Emperor Constantine X, marries General Romanos Diogenes (a member of a prominent Cappadocian family) – who is proclaimed co-emperor as Romanos IV of the Byzantine Empire.
- Autumn – Romanos IV begins a campaign against the Seljuk Turks, leading a Byzantine expeditionary force (which is in poor condition). He is successful in recapturing the fortress city of Hieropolis (modern-day Manbij) near Aleppo in northern Syria.
- Winter – Romanos IV leaves a portion of his army as a rearguard at Melitene. The Byzantine garrison fails to check a Seljuk raid that manages to sack Amorium (penetrating deep in Byzantine territory). Romanos winters near Aleppo before returning to Constantinople.

==== Europe ====
- Norman conquest of southern Italy: Norman forces under Robert Guiscard (duke of Apulia and Calabria) lay siege to the Byzantine city of Bari.
- Battle of the Alta River: The Cumans defeat the Kievan Rus' forces of Grand Prince Iziaslav I, and his brothers Sviatoslav II and Vsevolod I.
- Kiev Uprising: The city of Kiev rebels against Iziaslav I, in the aftermath of the Kievan Rus' defeat against the Cumans.
- Rethra destruction: In the Annals of Augsburg, the Slavic city is mentioned for the last time under the year 1068. It is captured by bishop Burchard, who destroys their temple and abducts the sacred white horse living there.
- Norman forces under Robert Guiscard and his brother Roger I invade Sicily. Muslim ruler Ayyub ibn Tamim's forces oppose them. The Normans and the Muslim army meet at the Battle of Misilmeri. The Norman forces defeat the Muslim army. Ayyub ibn Tamim flees from Sicily. The Norman conquest of the island continues to expand.

==== England ====
- Siege of Exeter: Norman forces under King William I (the Conqueror) take the city of Exeter after a siege of 18-days.
- William I begins a campaign in the East Midlands to put down the rebellions at Nottingham, Stafford, Lincoln and York.
- Edgar the Ætheling takes refuge with King Malcolm III of Scotland along with Edgar's sister Margaret, who marries King Malcolm.
- May 11 – William I brings his wife Matilda of Flanders to England. She is crowned queen in Westminster Abbey.

==== Africa ====
- September – Zaynab an-Nafzawiyyah marries Abu Bakr ibn Umar, leader of the Almoravids, and becomes his queen and co-regent.

==== Asia ====
The Imperial Cholas Empire under the reign of Virarajendra Chola on his 7th year of reign helps the shrivijaya civil war to end and the chola army helps reconquering the Kedah Tua (Kedah modern day Malaysia).

=== By topic ===
==== Geology ====
- March 18 – An earthquake affects the Near East, with a maximum Mercalli intensity of IX (Violent). The shock has a magnitude greater than 7, and leaves about 20,000 people dead.

=== By place ===
==== Byzantine Empire ====
- Spring – Emperor Romanos IV begins a campaign against the Seljuk Turks, and marches towards the Euphrates via Melitene. He crosses the river at Romanopolis (modern Turkey), and captures the strategic fortress city of Chliat on the north-western shore of Lake Van. Romanos leaves a Byzantine rear guard on the upper Euphrates under General Philaretos Brachamios with orders to defend the Mesopotamian frontier.
- Seljuk forces under Alp Arslan defeat the Byzantine rear guard and advance deep into Cappadocia and Lycaonia. They plunder at will, but fail to capture the city of Iconium. Romanos retreats and returns to Constantinople. Alp Arslan takes advantage of Romanos' retreat and captures Manzikert. He recaptures the strategical fortress cities of Chliat and Van, consolidating his control over the Lake Van region.

==== Europe ====
- Spring – Romanos IV sends a Byzantine fleet (supported with an army) to relieve the siege of Bari. The Normans under Robert Guiscard defeat the Byzantines, and occupy the cities of Gravina and Obbiano in Apulia.
- February 28 – King Abbad II al-Mu'tadid dies after a 27-year reign. He is succeeded by his son Al-Mu'tamid ibn Abbad, who becomes the ruler of the Taifa of Seville in Al-Andalus (until 1091).

==== England ====
- January 28 – Northumbrians kill the new Norman earl of Northumbria, Robert de Comines, at Durham, and attack York.
- King Sweyn II of Denmark lands a fleet in the Humber in support of the Northumbrian rebels and they join him to burn York, attacking its two castles and destroying the old Minster.
- At Stafford, William the Conqueror swiftly defeats a rebellion led by Edwin, Earl of Mercia.
- Winter of 1069–1070 – Harrying of the North: King William the Conqueror quells rebellions made by his English subjects against his rule, campaigning through the north of England with his forces, burning houses, crops, cattle and land from York to Durham, resulting in the deaths of over 100,000 people, mainly from starvation and winter cold.

==== Asia ====
- Emperor Shenzong of Song China appoints Wang Anshi as his chief chancellor. He implements the New Policies, which include financial and trade reforms, defense and order, institution of the baojia system, etc.
- Nam tiến, the southward expansion of the territory of Đại Việt (modern Vietnam), begins when a Lý dynasty army attacks Champa, capturing King Rudravarman III.

== Significant people ==
- William the Conqueror
- Harold Godwinson
- Harald Hardrada
- Edward the Confessor
- Edgar the Ætheling
- Tostig Godwinson
- Al-Qa'im
- Tughril
- Alp Arslan

== Births ==
1060

- February 9 – Honorius II, pope of the Catholic Church (d. 1130)
- September 18 – Godfrey of Bouillon, French nobleman (d. 1100)
- September 22 – Vitalis of Savigny, Catholic saint and itinerant preacher (d. 1122)
- Ava (or Ava of Göttweig), German poet (approximate date)
- Aibert (or Aybert), French monk and hermit (d. 1140)
- Bernard degli Uberti, bishop of Parma (approximate date)
- Berthold I, German nobleman (approximate date)
- Berthold of Garsten, German priest and abbot (d. 1142)
- Brahmadeva, Indian mathematician (d. 1130)
- Clementia of Aquitaine, French noblewoman (d. 1142)
- Diarmait Ua Briain, king of Munster (d. 1118)
- Duncan II, king of Scotland (approximate date)
- Constantius Ducas, Byzantine emperor (d. 1081)
- Diemoth (or Diemudis), German nun and writer (d. 1130)
- Egbert II, German nobleman (approximate date)
- Erard I, French nobleman (approximate date)
- Fujiwara no Mototoshi, Japanese nobleman (d. 1142)
- Gaucherius, French priest and hermit (d. 1140)
- Godfrey I, count of Louvain (approximate date)
- Goswin I, count of Heinsberg (approximate date)
- Gregory of Catino, Italian monk and historian
- Hamelin de Ballon, Norman nobleman (approximate date)
- Herman II, margrave of Baden (approximate date)
- Hui Zong, Chinese emperor (Western Xia) (d. 1086)
- Mafalda of Pulla-Calabria, Norman noblewoman (d. 1108)
- Odo of Tournai, bishop of Cambrai (d. 1113)
- Odo I (the Red), duke of Burgundy (d. 1102)
- Olegarius, archbishop of Tarragona (d. 1137)
- Ranulf Flambard, bishop of Durham (d. 1128)
- Richard of Salerno, Norman nobleman (approximate date)
- Roger Borsa, Norman nobleman (or 1061)
- Stephen Harding, English abbot (approximate date)
- Tokushi, Japanese empress consort (d. 1114)
- Walo II (or Galon II), French nobleman (d. 1098)

1061

- Al-Maziri, Zirid imam, jurist and scholar (d. 1141)
- Al-Tughrai, Persian poet and alchemist (d. 1121)
- Roger Borsa, duke of Apulia and Calabria (or 1060)
- Wuyashu, chieftain of the Wanyan tribe (d. 1113)

1062

- Bjørn Svendsen, Danish nobleman (approximate date)
- Fujiwara no Moromichi, Japanese nobleman (d. 1099)
- Nicephorus Bryennius, Byzantine statesman (d. 1137)
- Nicephorus Komnenos, Byzantine aristocrat

1063

- Eight Deer Jaguar Claw (or 8 Deer), Mixtec ruler (d. 1115)
- Yuanwu Keqin, Chinese Chan Buddhist monk (d. 1135)

1064

- Adela of Flanders, queen of Denmark (approximate date)
- Beatrice I, countess of Bigorre (approximate date)
- Bořivoj II (or Borivoi), duke of Bohemia (approximate date)
- Danxia Zichun, Chinese Zen Buddhist monk (d. 1117)
- Hugh of Flavigny, French abbot (approximate date)
- Robert Fitz Richard, English nobleman (d. 1136)

1065

- Agnes of Rheinfelden, duchess of Swabia (d. 1111)
- Callixtus II, pope of the Catholic Church (d. 1124)
- Guarinus of Sitten, bishop of Sion (approximate date)
- Henry I (the Long), German nobleman (d. 1087)
- Hugh VII of Lusignan, count of La Marche (d. 1151)
- Humbert II (the Fat), count of Savoy (d. 1103)
- Li Jie, Chinese writer of the Song Dynasty (d. 1110)
- Niels (or Nicholas), king of Denmark (d. 1134)
- Richard de Montfort, French nobleman (d. 1092)
- Robert II, count of Flanders (approximate date)
- Sibylla of Burgundy, duchess of Burgundy (approximate date)
- Stephen I, count palatine of Burgundy (d. 1102)
- Vladislaus I, duke of Bohemia (approximate date)
- Walter Tirel (or William Rufus), English nobleman

1066

- February 22 – Lý Nhân Tông, Vietnamese emperor (d. 1128)
- Al-Afdal Shahanshah, vizier of the Fatimid Caliphate (d. 1121)
- Gilbert Fitz Richard, English nobleman (approximate date)
- Godfrey of Amiens, French abbot and bishop (d. 1115)
- Henry, count of Portugal (House of Burgundy) (d. 1112)
- Irene Doukaina (or Ducaena), Byzantine empress (d. 1138)
- Wang Cha-ji, Korean politician and general (d. 1122)

1067

- Abu Hafs Umar an-Nasafi, Persian scholar and historian (d. 1142)
- Adela of Normandy, countess of Blois (approximate date)
- Ari Thorgilsson, Icelandic chronicler and writer (d. 1148)
- John Taronites, Byzantine governor (approximate date)

1068

- August 1 – Taizu (Aguda), emperor of the Jin Dynasty (d. 1123)
- Abu al-Salt, Moorish astronomer and polymath (approximate date)
- Ermengarde of Anjou, duchess of Aquitaine and Brittany (d. 1146)
- Haakon Magnusson (Toresfostre), king of Norway (d. 1095)
- Henry I, king of England (approximate date) (d. 1135)
- Peter I, king of Aragon (approximate date)
- Robert de Ferrers, 1st Earl Derby (d. 1139)

1069

- Anseau of Garlande, French nobleman (d. 1118)
- Kamakura Gongorō Kagemasa, Japanese samurai
- Leo Diogenes, Byzantine co-emperor (d. 1087)
- Approximate date
  - Mieszko Bolesławowic, Polish prince (d.1089)
  - Diego Gelmírez, Galician archbishop

== Deaths ==
1060

- January 18 – Duduc (or Dudoc), bishop of Wells
- May 12 – Matilda, duchess of Swabia (d. 1048)
- August 4 – Henry I, king of France (b. 1008)
- October 2 – Everelmus, French hermit
- October 8 – Hugh V, French nobleman
- October 15 – Luka Zhidiata, bishop of Novgorod
- November 14 – Geoffrey II, count of Anjou
- December 2 – Gebhard III, bishop of Regensburg
- December 22 – Cynesige, archbishop of York
- Abbas ibn Shith, king (malik) of the Ghurid Dynasty
- Abdallah ibn Al-Aftas, founder of the Aftasid Dynasty
- Ahimaaz ben Paltiel, Italian-Jewish liturgical poet (b. 1017)
- Andrew I (the Catholic), king of Hungary
- Chaghri Beg, co-ruler of the Seljuk Empire (b. 989)
- Dharma Pala, ruler of the Pala Dynasty (b. 1035)
- Dominic Loricatus, Italian monk and hermit (b. 995)
- Emund the Old, king of Sweden (approximate date)
- Esico of Ballenstedt, German nobleman (approximate date)
- Igor Yaroslavich, prince of Smolensk (b. 1036)
- Isaac I (Komnenos), Byzantine emperor
- Mei Yaochen, poet of the Song Dynasty (b. 1002)
- Otto I (or Odon), count of Savoy (approximate date)
- Pons II (or Pons William), count of Toulouse (b. 991)
- William I, Norman nobleman (approximate date)

1061

- January 28 – Spytihněv II, duke of Bohemia (b. 1031)
- May 5 – Humbert of Moyenmoutier, French cardinal
- June 28 – Floris I, count of Friesland (west of the Vlie)
- July 13 – Beatrice I, German abbess of Quedlinburg (b. 1037)
- July 27 – Nicholas II, pope of the Catholic Church
- Adelmann, bishop of Brescia (approximate date)
- Ali ibn Ridwan, Arab physician and astronomer (approximate date)
- Burgheard, English nobleman
- Burkhard I, Lord of Zollern (or Burchardus), German nobleman, killed
- Conrad III, Duke of Carinthia (or Konrad), German nobleman
- Gardizi, Persian geographer and historian
- Henry I, Count Palatine of Lotharingia (or Heinrich), German nobleman
- Rajaraja Narendra, Indian ruler (b. 1022)
- Rúaidhri Ua Flaithbheartaigh, Irish king of Iar Connacht, killed
- Song Qi (Zijing), Chinese statesman and historian (b. 998)

1062

- January 27 – Adelaide of Hungary, German duchess
- February 2 – Atenulf I, Lombard nobleman
- March 9 – Herbert II, French nobleman
- May 20 – Bao Zheng, Chinese politician (b. 999)
- October 22
  - Abe no Sadato, Japanese nobleman
  - Fujiwara no Tsunekiyo, Japanese nobleman
- Abu Mansur Fulad Sutun, Buyid emir of Fars
- Al-Mu'izz ibn Badis, Zirid ruler of Ifriqiya (b. 1008)
- Al-Quda'i, Fatimid preacher and historian
- Emma of Provence, French noblewoman
- Geoffrey I, French nobleman (approximate date)
- Mu'izz al-Dawla Thimal, Mirdasid emir of Aleppo
- Nissim ben Jacob, Tunisian Jewish rabbi (b. 990)
- William IV, count of Weimar and Orlamünde
- Ibn al-Timnah, Emir of Syracuse

1063

- March 21 – Richeza of Lotharingia, queen of Poland
- April 30 – Ren Zong, emperor of the Song Dynasty (b. 1010)
- May 8 – Ramiro I, king of Aragon (House of Jiménez)
- August 5 – Gruffydd ap Llywelyn, king of Gwynedd
- August 9 – Constantine III, Byzantine patriarch
- September 3 – Henry II, archbishop of Augsburg
- September 4 – Tughril, sultan of the Seljuk Empire (b. 990)
- September 11 – Béla I (the Champion), king of Hungary
- December 7 – Qutalmish, prince of the Seljuk Empire
- Gotebald (or Gotebold), patriarch of Aquileia
- Hedwig (or Advisa), countess of Nevers
- Hilduin IV, count of Montdidier and Roucy
- Pang Ji, Chinese official and chancellor (b. 988)
- Sudislav Vladimirovich, prins of Pskov
- Sylvester III, pope of the Catholic Church

1064

- August 15 – Ibn Hazm, Andalusian historian and poet (b. 994)
- November 29 – Al-Kunduri, vizier of the Seljuk Empire (b. 1024)
- December 19 – Fujiwara no Nagaie, Japanese nobleman (b. 1005)
- Akkadevi, princess of the Chalukya dynasty (b. 1010)
- Dromtön, Tibetan monk and founder of Reting Monastery
- Dub dá Leithe (or Dubhdalethe), Irish abbot
- Gozelo I (or Gozelon), count of Montaigu
- Llywelyn Aurdorchog, Welsh nobleman (approximate date)
- Yaakov ben Yakar, German Jewish rabbi (b. 990)
- Yi Yuanji, Chinese painter (approximate date)

1065

- February 7 – Siegfried I, count of Sponheim
- May 17 – Egilbert (or Engelbert), bishop of Passau
- May 18 – Frederick, duke of Lower Lorraine
- June 27 – George the Hagiorite, Georgian calligrapher (b. 1009)
- July 22 – Ibn Abi Hasina, Arab poet and panegyrist (b. 998)
- July 23 – Gunther of Bamberg, German nobleman
- December 24 – Ferdinand I (the Great), king of León and Castile
- Diarmaid mac Tadgh Ua Ceallaigh, king of Uí Maine
- Ermengol III (or Armengol), count of Urgell (b. 1032)
- Gisela (or Gizella), queen consort of Hungary (b. 985)
- Gomes Echigues, Portuguese knight and governor (b. 1010)
- Gusiluo, Tibetan religious leader of Buddhism (b. 997)
- Llywelyn Aurdorchog, Welsh nobleman (approximate date)
- Thorfinn (the Mighty), Norse nobleman (approximate date)

1066

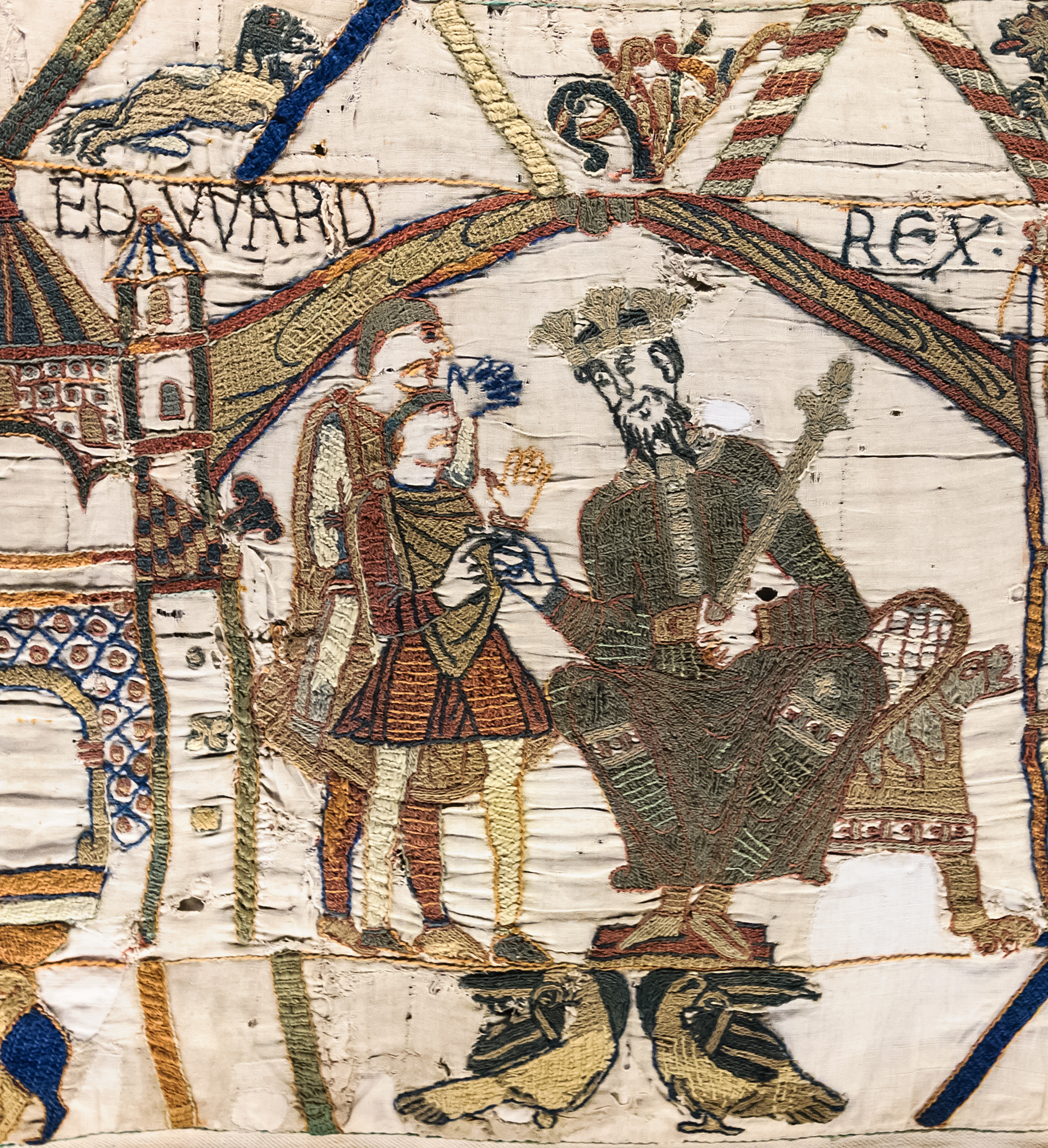
Edward the Confessor as he appears in the Bayeux Tapestry.

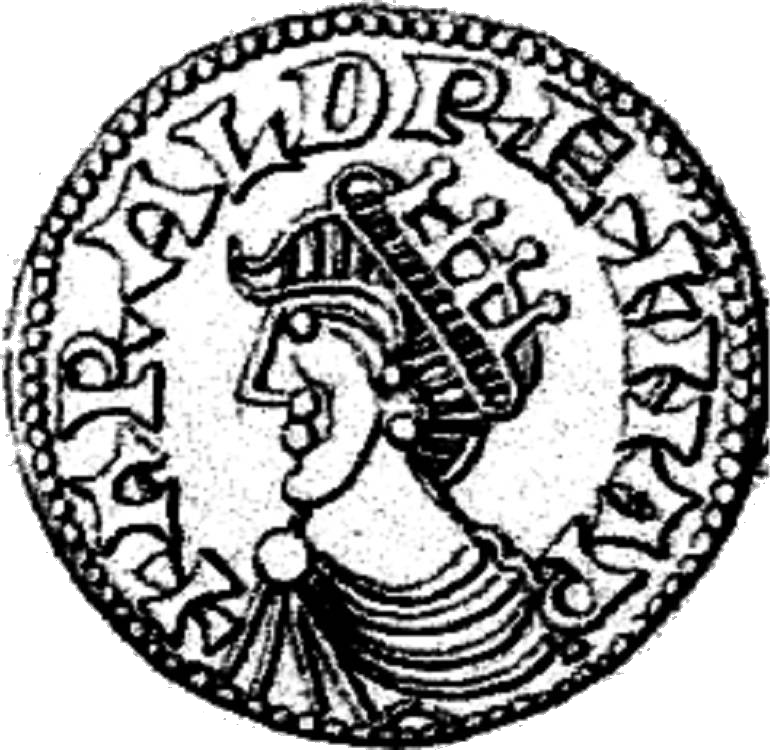
A coin depicting Harold III.

- January 5 – Edward the Confessor, king of England
- February 3 – Rostislav of Tmutarakan, Kievan Rus' prince (b. 1038)
- February 12 – Everard I of Breteuil, French nobleman
- March 26 – Ibn Sidah, Moorish linguist and lexicographer (b. 1007)
- April 9 – Al-Bayhaqi, Persian Sunni hadith scholar (b. 994)
- May 21 – Su Xun, Chinese scholar and writer (b. 1009)
- June 6 – Gottschalk (or Godescalc), Obotrite prince
- June 27 – Arialdo, Italian nobleman and deacon
- August 15 – Al-Qadi Abu Ya'la, Arab Hanbali scholar (b. 990)
- September 25 (killed at the Battle of Stamford Bridge):
  - Eystein Orre, Norwegian nobleman
  - Harald III (Harald Hardrada), king of Norway
  - Tostig Godwinson, earl of Northumbria
- September 25 – Maria Haraldsdotter, Norwegian princess
- October 14 (killed at the Battle of Hastings):
  - Harold II (Harold Godwinson), king of England
  - Leofwine Godwinson, brother of Harold II
  - Gyrth Godwinson, brother of Harold II
  - Taillefer, Norman minstrel
- November 10 – John Scotus, bishop of Mecklenburg
  - Sacrificed to Radegast, the god of hospitality.
- November 14 – Fujiwara no Akihira, Japanese nobleman
- December 11 – Conan II, duke of Brittany
- December 30 – Yusuf ibn Naghrela, Jewish vizier
- Abu al-Hakam al-Kirmani, Moorish philosopher
- Ali al-Sulayhi, sultan of Yemen and Tihamah (b. 966)
- Conrad of Pfullingen, archbishop of Trier
- Herluin de Conteville, Norman nobleman (b. 1001)
- Kraft of Meissen (or Crafto), German bishop
- Reiner of Meissen (or Rainer), German bishop
- Śrīpati, Indian astronomer and mathematician (b. 1019)
- Theobald of Provins, French hermit (b. 1033)
- Udayadityavarman II, Cambodian ruler
- Yahya of Antioch, Byzantine historian

1067

- January 25 – Ying Zong, Chinese emperor (b. 1032)
- February 13 – Geoffrey II, French nobleman
- April 17 – Robert de Turlande, French priest
- May 22 – Constantine X, Byzantine emperor (b. 1006)
- July 12 – John Komnenos, Byzantine general
- September 1 – Baldwin V, count of Flanders
- November 27 – Sancha of León, queen of León
- December 2 – Shaykh Tusi, Persian Shia scholar (b. 995)
- Aedh Ua Con Ceanainn, king of Uí Díarmata
- Bahmanyār, Persian philosopher and logician
- Cai Xiang, Chinese calligrapher and poet (b. 1012)
- Elisaveta Yaroslavna of Kiev, Norwegian queen
- Eric and Eric, Swedish throne pretenders
- Gervais de Château-du-Loir, French nobleman (b. 1007)
- Muireadhach Ua Cárthaigh, Irish chief poet
- Richard, French nobleman (House of Normandy)
- Wulfwig (or Wulfinus), bishop of Dorchester

1068

- January 11 – Egbert I, margrave of Meissen
- May 22 – Go-Reizei, emperor of Japan (b. 1025)
- November 10 – Agnes of Burgundy, duchess of Aquitaine
- Abulchares, Byzantine general and catepan
- Ali ibn Yusuf al-Ilaqi, Persian physician
- Argyrus, Lombard nobleman and general
- Böritigin, ruler of Transoxiana (Kara-Khanid Khanate)
- Choe Chung, Korean Confucian scholar (b. 984)
- Eadnoth the Constable, English landowner
- Ralph the Staller, English nobleman
- William IV (or Guillem), French nobleman
- William of Montreuil, Italo-Norman duke
- Yi Zong, emperor of Western Xia (b. 1047)
- Vijayaditya VI, king of the Eastern Chalukyas (unconfirmed)

1069

- January 28 – Robert de Comines, English nobleman
- February 28 – Abbad II al-Mu'tadid, Abbadid king
- April 28 – Magnus II (Haraldsson), king of Norway
- August 15 – Ibn Hazm, Moorish historian (b. 994)
- September 11 – Ealdred, archbishop of York
- December 24 – Dedi II (the Younger), margrave of Lower Lusatia (b. c.997)
- Godfrey III (the Bearded), duke of Lower Lorraine
- Gytha Thorkelsdóttir, Danish noblewoman (b. 997)
- Pedro Seguin (or Seguini), bishop of Ourense
- Tilopa, Indian tantric practitioner (b. 988)
- Approximate date – Rhiwallon ap Cynfyn, Welsh king (b. c.1020)
