= 1064 =

1064 in various calendars
- Gregorian calendar: 1064; MLXIV
- Ab urbe condita: 1817
- Armenian calendar: 513; ԹՎ ՇԺԳ
- Assyrian calendar: 5814
- Balinese saka calendar: 985–986
- Bengali calendar: 470–471
- Berber calendar: 2014
- English Regnal year: N/A
- Buddhist calendar: 1608
- Burmese calendar: 426
- Byzantine calendar: 6572–6573
- Chinese calendar: 癸卯年 (Water Rabbit); 3761 or 3554 — to — 甲辰年 (Wood Dragon); 3762 or 3555
- Coptic calendar: 780–781
- Discordian calendar: 2230
- Ethiopian calendar: 1056–1057
- Hebrew calendar: 4824–4825
- Hindu calendars
- Vikram Samvat: 1120–1121
- Shaka Samvat: 985–986
- Kali Yuga: 4164–4165
- Holocene calendar: 11064
- Igbo calendar: 64–65
- Iranian calendar: 442–443
- Islamic calendar: 456–457
- Japanese calendar: Kōhei 7 (康平７年)
- Javanese calendar: 967–968
- Julian calendar: 1064; MLXIV
- Korean calendar: 3397
- Minguo calendar: 848 before ROC 民前848年
- Nanakshahi calendar: −404
- Seleucid era: 1375/1376 AG
- Thai solar calendar: 1606–1607
- Tibetan calendar: ཆུ་མོ་ཡོས་ལོ་ (female Water-Hare); 1190 or 809 or 37 — to — ཤིང་ཕོ་འབྲུག་ལོ་ (male Wood-Dragon); 1191 or 810 or 38

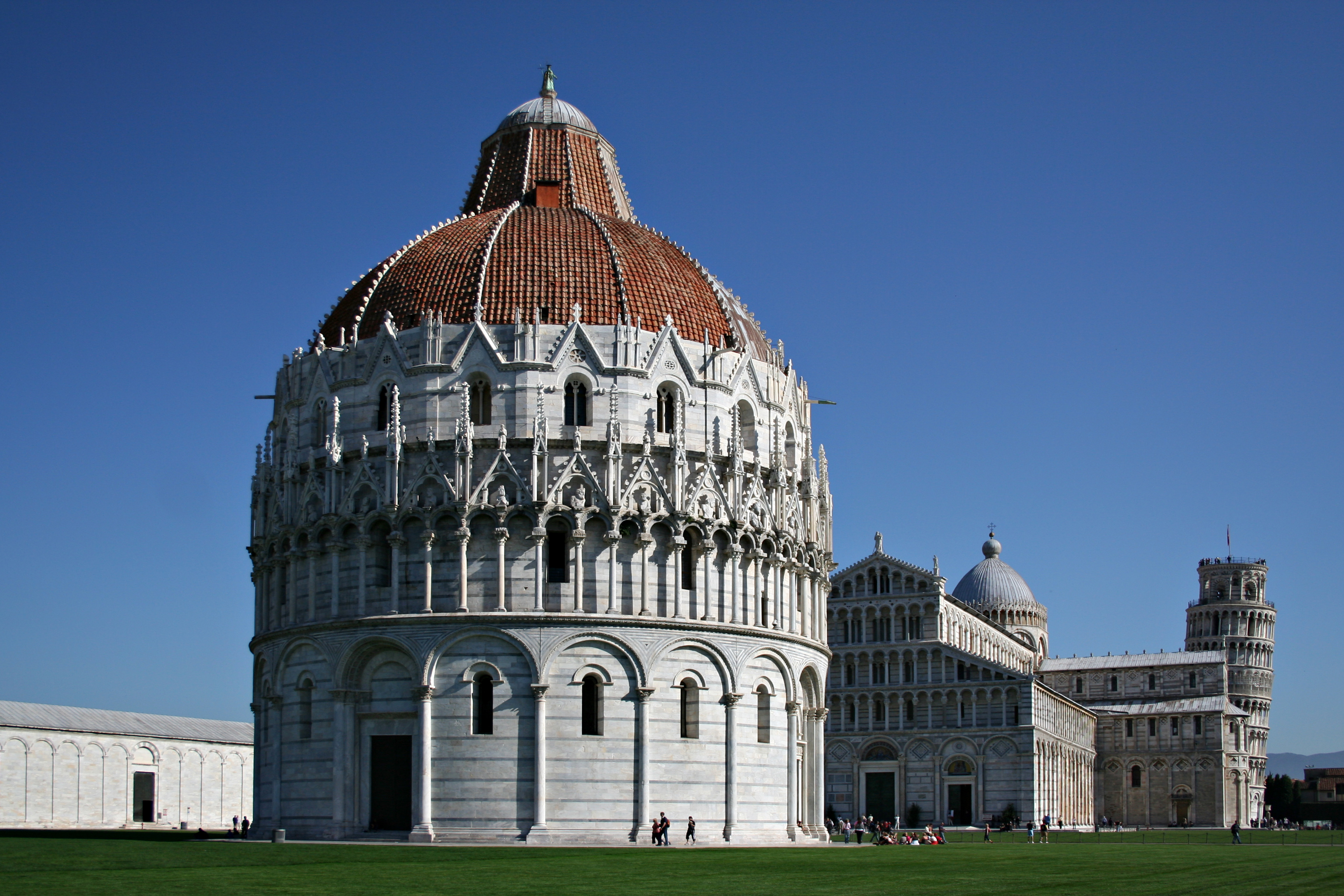
The Piazza dei Miracoli in Pisa (Italy)

Year 1064 (MLXIV) was a leap year starting on Thursday of the Julian calendar.

== Events ==
=== By place ===
==== Europe ====
- Summer – King Ferdinand I (the Great) conquers more territory in modern-day Portugal and captures Coimbra. He appoints Sisnando Davides to reorganise the economy and administer the lands encircling the city.
- European warriors go to Spain, to participate in the siege of Barbastro. This expedition is sanctioned by Pope Alexander II – and is now regarded as an early form of Crusade.
- Harold Godwinson, Earl of Wessex, is shipwrecked on the shores of Ponthieu (Normandy). He is captured by Count Guy I who takes him as hostage to his castle of Beaurian.
- Duke William I (the Bastard) demands the release of Harold Godwinson from Guy I (after a ransom being paid). Harold must swear an oath to aid William to the throne of England.
- Kings Harald Hardrada of Norway and Sweyn II of Denmark agree to a peace agreement. Harald turns his attentions to England where he believes he has a right to the throne.

==== Seljuk Empire ====
- April 27 – Alp Arslan succeeds to the throne, as sultan of the Seljuk Empire. He becomes sole ruler of Persia from the river Oxus to the Tigris.
- The Seljuk Turks under Alp Arslan invade Anatolia, and capture Ani after a siege of 25-days. He sacks the city and slaughters its citizens.
- Badr al-Jamali, Fatimid governor of Syria, tries to engineer a pro-Fatimid coup in Aleppo; but the rebellion is suppressed by Musa Yabgu.

==== Asia ====
- King Bagrat IV of Georgia captures the fortress city of Samshvilde, the capital of the neighboring Tashir-Dzoraget.

==== Mesoamerica ====
- January 4 – The Aztecs migrate from Aztlán to the southern lands in central Mexico.

=== By topic ===
==== Religion ====
- Winter – Great German Pilgrimage: Archbishop Siegfried I of Mainz leads a pilgrimage to Jerusalem. Either during this pilgrimage or shortly before it, the Ezzolied; a High German poem on the life of Jesus, is composed.
- Michaelsberg Abbey at Siegburg (modern Germany) is founded by Anno II, archbishop of Cologne.
- Construction of the Piazza dei Miracoli (known as Piazza del Duomo) at Pisa in Tuscany begins.

==== Volcanology ====
- Sunset Crater Volcano (modern-day Arizona) first erupts (approximate date)

== Births ==
- Adela of Flanders, queen of Denmark (approximate date)
- Beatrice I, countess of Bigorre (approximate date)
- Bořivoj II (or Borivoi), duke of Bohemia (approximate date)
- Danxia Zichun, Chinese Zen Buddhist monk (d. 1117)
- Hugh of Flavigny, French abbot (approximate date)
- Robert Fitz Richard, English nobleman (d. 1136)

== Deaths ==
- August 15 – Ibn Hazm, Andalusian historian and poet (b. 994)
- November 29 – Al-Kunduri, vizier of the Seljuk Empire (b. 1024)
- December 19 – Fujiwara no Nagaie, Japanese nobleman (b. 1005)
- Akkadevi, princess of the Chalukya dynasty (b. 1010)
- Dromtön, Tibetan monk and founder of Reting Monastery
- Dub dá Leithe (or Dubhdalethe), Irish abbot
- Gozelo I (or Gozelon), count of Montaigu
- Llywelyn Aurdorchog, Welsh nobleman (approximate date)
- Yaakov ben Yakar, German Jewish rabbi (b. 990)
- Yi Yuanji, Chinese painter (approximate date)
