= 1068 =

1068 in various calendars
- Gregorian calendar: 1068; MLXVIII
- Ab urbe condita: 1821
- Armenian calendar: 517; ԹՎ ՇԺԷ
- Assyrian calendar: 5818
- Balinese saka calendar: 989–990
- Bengali calendar: 474–475
- Berber calendar: 2018
- English Regnal year: 2 Will. 1 – 3 Will. 1
- Buddhist calendar: 1612
- Burmese calendar: 430
- Byzantine calendar: 6576–6577
- Chinese calendar: 丁未年 (Fire Goat); 3765 or 3558 — to — 戊申年 (Earth Monkey); 3766 or 3559
- Coptic calendar: 784–785
- Discordian calendar: 2234
- Ethiopian calendar: 1060–1061
- Hebrew calendar: 4828–4829
- Hindu calendars
- Vikram Samvat: 1124–1125
- Shaka Samvat: 989–990
- Kali Yuga: 4168–4169
- Holocene calendar: 11068
- Igbo calendar: 68–69
- Iranian calendar: 446–447
- Islamic calendar: 460–461
- Japanese calendar: Jiryaku 4 (治暦４年)
- Javanese calendar: 972–973
- Julian calendar: 1068; MLXVIII
- Korean calendar: 3401
- Minguo calendar: 844 before ROC 民前844年
- Nanakshahi calendar: −400
- Seleucid era: 1379/1380 AG
- Thai solar calendar: 1610–1611
- Tibetan calendar: མེ་མོ་ལུག་ལོ་ (female Fire-Sheep); 1194 or 813 or 41 — to — ས་ཕོ་སྤྲེ་ལོ་ (male Earth-Monkey); 1195 or 814 or 42

1068 (MLXVIII) was a leap year starting on Tuesday of the Julian calendar, the 1068th year of the Common Era (CE) and Anno Domini (AD) designations, the 68th year of the 2nd millennium and the 11th century, and the 9th year of the 1060s decade. As of the start of 1068, the Gregorian calendar was 6 days ahead of the Julian calendar, which was the dominant calendar of the time.

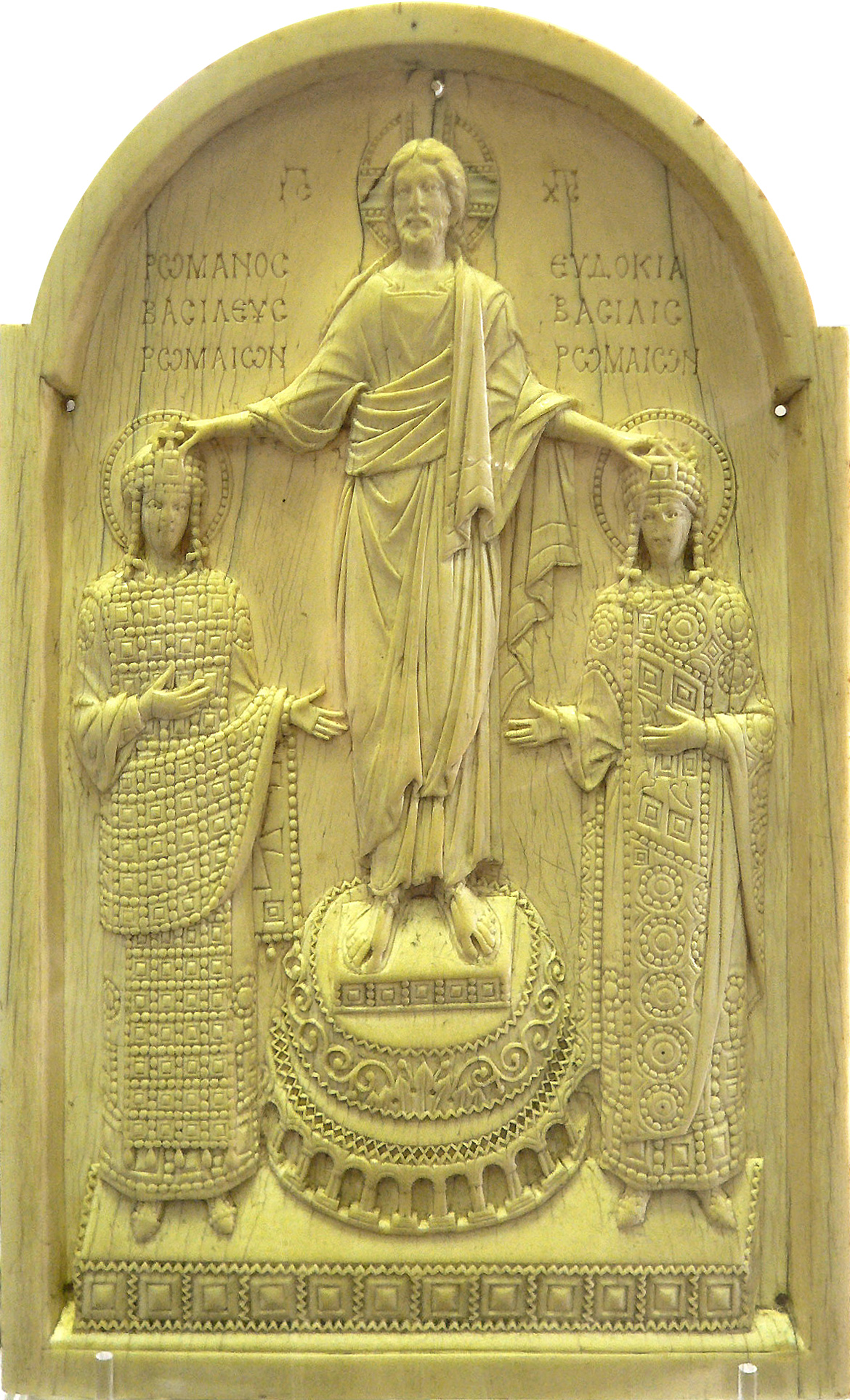
Emperor Romanos IV (left) and Empress Eudokia are crowned by Jesus Christ.

== Events ==
=== By place ===
==== Byzantine Empire ====
- January 1 – Empress Eudokia Makrembolitissa, wife of the late Emperor Constantine X, marries General Romanos Diogenes (a member of a prominent Cappadocian family) – who is proclaimed co-emperor as Romanos IV of the Byzantine Empire.
- Autumn – Romanos IV begins a campaign against the Seljuk Turks, leading a Byzantine expeditionary force (which is in poor condition). He is successful in recapturing the fortress city of Hieropolis (modern-day Manbij) near Aleppo in northern Syria.
- Winter – Romanos IV leaves a portion of his army as a rearguard at Melitene. The Byzantine garrison fails to check a Seljuk raid that manages to sack Amorium (penetrating deep in Byzantine territory). Romanos winters near Aleppo before returning to Constantinople.

==== Europe ====
- Norman conquest of southern Italy: Norman forces under Robert Guiscard (duke of Apulia and Calabria) lay siege to the Byzantine city of Bari.
- Battle of the Alta River: The Cumans defeat the Kievan Rus' forces of Grand Prince Iziaslav I, and his brothers Sviatoslav II and Vsevolod I.
- Kiev Uprising: The city of Kiev rebels against Iziaslav I, in the aftermath of the Kievan Rus' defeat against the Cumans.
- Rethra destruction: In the Annals of Augsburg, the Slavic city is mentioned for the last time under the year 1068. It is captured by bishop Burchard, who destroys their temple and abducts the sacred white horse living there.
- Norman forces under Robert Guiscard and his brother Roger I invade Sicily. Muslim ruler Ayyub ibn Tamim's forces oppose them. The Normans and the Muslim army meet at the Battle of Misilmeri. The Norman forces defeat the Muslim army. Ayyub ibn Tamim flees from Sicily. The Norman conquest of the island continues to expand.

==== England ====
- Siege of Exeter: Norman forces under King William I (the Conqueror) take the city of Exeter after a siege of 18-days.
- William I begins a campaign in the East Midlands to put down the rebellions at Nottingham, Stafford, Lincoln and York.
- Edgar the Ætheling takes refuge with King Malcolm III of Scotland along with Edgar's sister Margaret, who marries King Malcolm.
- May 11 – William I brings his wife Matilda of Flanders to England. She is crowned queen in Westminster Abbey.

==== Africa ====
- September – Zaynab an-Nafzawiyyah marries Abu Bakr ibn Umar, leader of the Almoravids, and becomes his queen and co-regent.

==== Asia ====
- Emperor Virarajendra Chola intervened in the conflict over Kadaram (Kedah), defeating its opponents and restoring the displaced ruler to the throne

=== By topic ===
==== Geology ====
- March 18 – An earthquake affects the Near East, with a maximum Mercalli intensity of IX (Violent). The shock has a magnitude greater than 7, and leaves about 20,000 people dead.

== Births ==
- August 1 – Taizu (Aguda), emperor of the Jin Dynasty (d. 1123)
- Abu al-Salt, Moorish astronomer and polymath (approximate date)
- Ermengarde of Anjou, duchess of Aquitaine and Brittany (d. 1146)
- Haakon Magnusson (Toresfostre), king of Norway (d. 1095)
- Henry I, king of England (approximate date) (d. 1135)
- Peter I, king of Aragon (approximate date)
- Robert de Ferrers, 1st Earl Derby (d. 1139)

== Deaths ==
- January 11 – Egbert I, margrave of Meissen
- May 22 – Go-Reizei, emperor of Japan (b. 1025)
- November 10 – Agnes of Burgundy, duchess of Aquitaine
- Abulchares, Byzantine general and catepan
- Ali ibn Yusuf al-Ilaqi, Persian physician
- Argyrus, Lombard nobleman and general
- Böritigin, ruler of Transoxiana (Kara-Khanid Khanate)
- Choe Chung, Korean Confucian scholar (b. 984)
- Eadnoth the Constable, English landowner
- Ralph the Staller, English nobleman
- William IV (or Guillem), French nobleman
- William of Montreuil, Italo-Norman duke
- Yi Zong, emperor of Western Xia (b. 1047)
- Vijayaditya VI, king of the Eastern Chalukyas (unconfirmed)
