= 990 =

Calendar year

990 in various calendars
- Gregorian calendar: 990; CMXC
- Ab urbe condita: 1743
- Armenian calendar: 439; ԹՎ ՆԼԹ
- Assyrian calendar: 5740
- Balinese saka calendar: 911–912
- Bengali calendar: 396–397
- Berber calendar: 1940
- Buddhist calendar: 1534
- Burmese calendar: 352
- Byzantine calendar: 6498–6499
- Chinese calendar: 己丑年 (Earth Ox); 3687 or 3480 — to — 庚寅年 (Metal Tiger); 3688 or 3481
- Coptic calendar: 706–707
- Discordian calendar: 2156
- Ethiopian calendar: 982–983
- Hebrew calendar: 4750–4751
- Hindu calendars
- Vikram Samvat: 1046–1047
- Shaka Samvat: 911–912
- Kali Yuga: 4090–4091
- Holocene calendar: 10990
- Iranian calendar: 368–369
- Islamic calendar: 379–380
- Japanese calendar: Eiso 3 / Shōryaku 1 (正暦元年)
- Javanese calendar: 891–892
- Julian calendar: 990; CMXC
- Korean calendar: 3323
- Minguo calendar: 922 before ROC 民前922年
- Nanakshahi calendar: −478
- Seleucid era: 1301/1302 AG
- Thai solar calendar: 1532–1533
- Tibetan calendar: ས་མོ་གླང་ལོ་ (female Earth-Ox); 1116 or 735 or −37 — to — ལྕགས་ཕོ་སྟག་ལོ་ (male Iron-Tiger); 1117 or 736 or −36

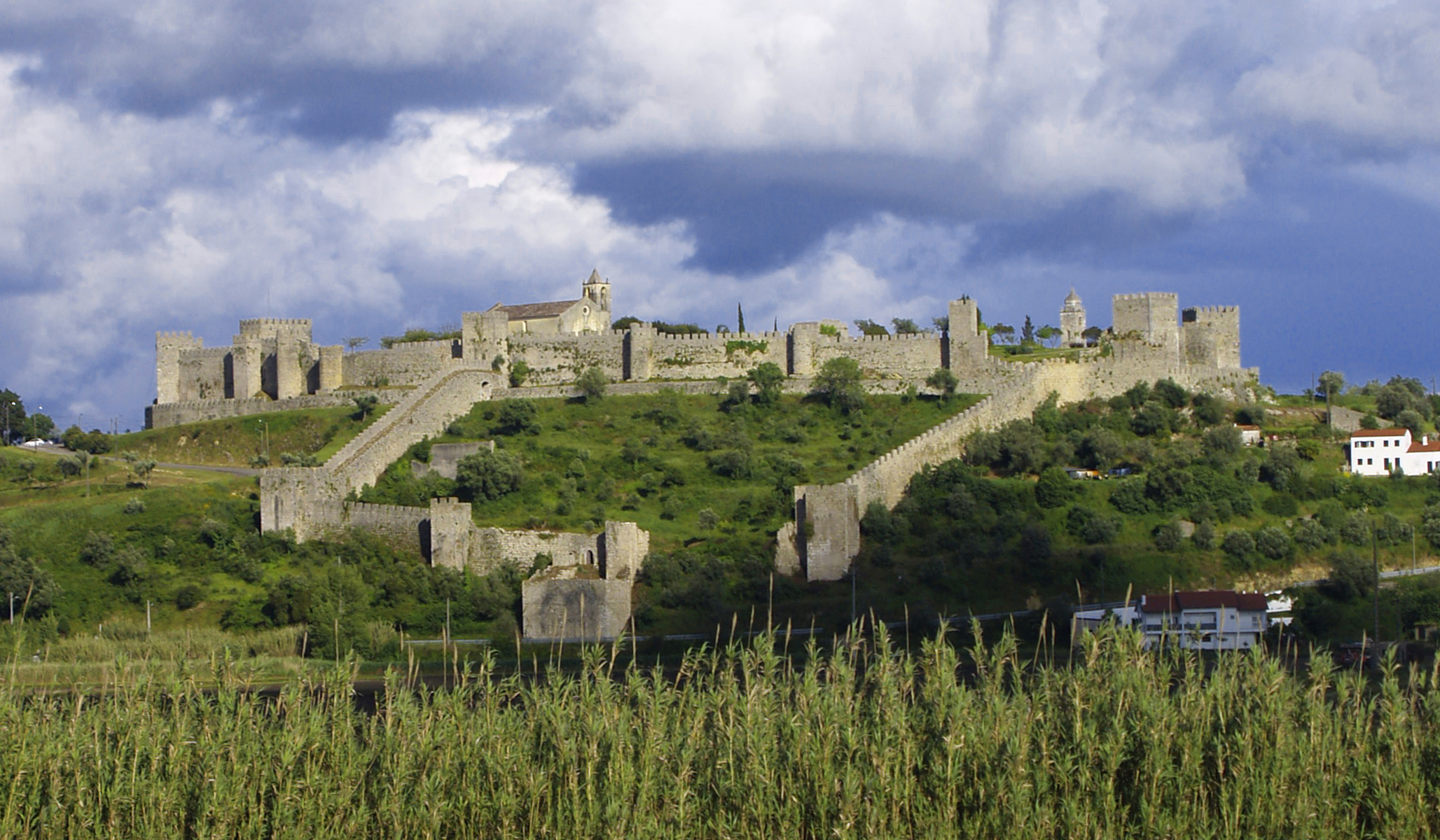
Castle of Montemor-o-Velho (Portugal)

Year 990 (CMXC) was a common year starting on Wednesday of the Julian calendar.

== Events ==
=== By place ===
==== Europe ====
- Al-Mansur, Chancellor and effective ruler of Al-Andalus, conquers the Castle of Montemor-o-Velho (modern Portugal), expanding the Umayyad Caliphate of Córdoba.
- The city of Lund, (now) Sweden is founded, during the reign of the Danish king Sweyn Forkbeard (approximate date).
- Herbert III of Vermandois, 6th great-grandson of Charlemagne, marries his wife, Hermengarde of Bar-sur-Seine

==== Africa ====
- The Ghana Empire takes the Berber town of Aoudaghost (modern Mauritania) as the West African nation makes further gains.
- Construction of the Al-Hakim Mosque by orders of the Fatimid vizier Gawar Al-Siqilli begins in Cairo (modern Egypt).

==== Asia ====
- King Dharmawangsa of the Kingdom of Mataram launches an invasion on Sriwijaya in Sumatra and unsuccessfully attempt to capture the city of Palembang.

=== By topic ===
==== Religion ====
- June – The Pax Ecclesiae, an edict by the Catholic Church, is promulgated. Held at three synods in different parts of southern and central France (at Charroux, Narbonne and Puy), it attempts to outlaw acts of war against non-combatants and the clergy.

== Births ==
- November 11 – Gisela of Swabia, Holy Roman Empress (d. 1043)
- Adamo Abate, Italian Benedictine abbot (approximate date)
- Al-Qadi Abu Ya'la, Arab Hanbali scholar and jurist (d. 1066)
- Bi Sheng, Chinese inventor of movable type printing (d. 1051)
- Chananel ben Chushiel, Tunisian Jewish rabbi (d. 1053)
- Conrad II (the Elder), Holy Roman Emperor (d. 1039)
- Edmund II (Ironside), king of England (d. 1016)
- Grigor Magistros, Armenian prince (d. 1058)
- John Scotus, bishop of Mecklenburg (d. 1066)
- John Vladimir, Serbian prince (approximate date)
- Kálfr Árnason, Norwegian chieftain (approximate date)
- Mieszko II, king of Poland (approximate date)
- Nissim ben Jacob, Tunisian Jewish rabbi (d. 1062)
- Theobald of Dorat, French monk and saint (d. 1070)
- Theodoric II, margrave of Lower Lusatia (d. 1034)
- Thietmar, margrave of the Saxon Ostmark (d. 1030)
- Tughril, sultan of the Seljuk Empire (d. 1063)
- Yaakov ben Yakar, German Jewish rabbi (d. 1064)
- Zhang Xian, Chinese poet and writer (d. 1078)

== Deaths ==
- March 15 – Siegfried I (the Older), German nobleman
- March 25 – Nicodemus of Mammola, Italian monk and saint
- April 23 – Ekkehard II (the Courtier), Swiss monk and abbot
- June 15 – Theophanu, Holy Roman Empress and regent
- July 26 – Fujiwara no Kaneie, Japanese statesman (b. 929)
- September 16 – Folcuin, Frankish abbot of Saint Bertin
- December 10 – Folcmar (Poppo), bishop of Utrecht
- Al-Saghani, Persian astronomer and historian of science
- Al-Tamimi, Arab writer and physician (approximate date)
- Dunash ben Labrat, Arab Jewish commentator (b. 920)
- Indra Pala, ruler of the Pala Dynasty (India) (b. 960)
- Kiyohara no Motosuke, Japanese nobleman (b. 908)
- Nazif ibn Yumn, Melkite Christian mathematician and translator
- Oliba Cabreta, count of Cerdanya and Besalú (Spain)
- Qarghuyah, Hamdanid administrator and governor
- Sahl ben Matzliah, Jewish philosopher (b. 910)
- Urard Mac Coise, Irish poet (Ollamh Érenn)
