= Sahl =

Sahl may refer to:

- Arabic sahl سهل "easy", given name:
  - Sahl ibn Bishr, Persian translator and astrologer
  - Ibn Sahl (disambiguation)
  - Abū Sahl al-Qūhī, Persian mathematician, physicist and astronomer
  - Sahl Smbatean, medieval Armenian prince
- Jewish given name סהל
  - Sahl ben Matzliah (d. 990), Karaite hakam
- Jewish surname
  - Hans Sahl (1902–1993), German literature-, film- and theatre-critic
  - Jan Sahl (born 1950), Norwegian politician
  - Mort Sahl (1927–2021), American comedian and actor
