= 1005 =

Calendar year

1005 in various calendars
- Gregorian calendar: 1005; MV
- Ab urbe condita: 1758
- Armenian calendar: 454; ԹՎ ՆԾԴ
- Assyrian calendar: 5755
- Balinese saka calendar: 926–927
- Bengali calendar: 411–412
- Berber calendar: 1955
- English Regnal year: N/A
- Buddhist calendar: 1549
- Burmese calendar: 367
- Byzantine calendar: 6513–6514
- Chinese calendar: 甲辰年 (Wood Dragon); 3702 or 3495 — to — 乙巳年 (Wood Snake); 3703 or 3496
- Coptic calendar: 721–722
- Discordian calendar: 2171
- Ethiopian calendar: 997–998
- Hebrew calendar: 4765–4766
- Hindu calendars
- Vikram Samvat: 1061–1062
- Shaka Samvat: 926–927
- Kali Yuga: 4105–4106
- Holocene calendar: 11005
- Igbo calendar: 5–6
- Iranian calendar: 383–384
- Islamic calendar: 395–396
- Japanese calendar: Kankō 2 (寛弘２年)
- Javanese calendar: 907–908
- Julian calendar: 1005; MV
- Korean calendar: 3338
- Minguo calendar: 907 before ROC 民前907年
- Nanakshahi calendar: −463
- Seleucid era: 1316/1317 AG
- Thai solar calendar: 1547–1548
- Tibetan calendar: ཤིང་ཕོ་འབྲུག་ལོ་ (male Wood-Dragon); 1131 or 750 or −22 — to — ཤིང་མོ་སྦྲུལ་ལོ་ (female Wood-Snake); 1132 or 751 or −21

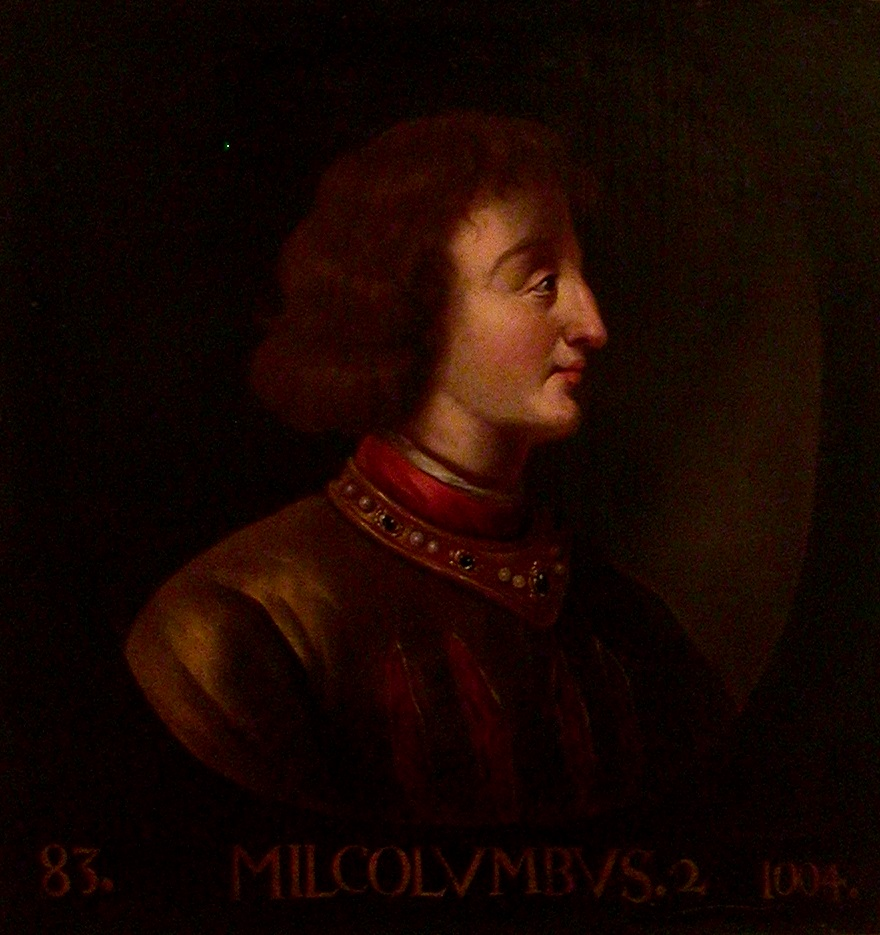
King Malcolm II of Scotland (c. 954–1034)

Year 1005 (MV) was a common year starting on Monday of the Julian calendar.

== Events ==
=== By place ===
==== Europe ====
- Spring – The Republic of Pisa conducts a military offensive against the Saracen strongholds in Southern Italy. The Pisan fleet sacks the city of Reggio Calabria. Pisa becomes one of the four commercial Maritime republics (the other three are Genoa, Venice and Amalfi), which fight each other for control of the Mediterranean Sea.

==== British Isles ====
- March 25 – King Kenneth III of Scotland is killed in the battle of Monzievaird in Strathearn. He is succeeded by his cousin Malcolm II ("Forranach, the Destroyer", son of the late King Kenneth II) as ruler of Scotland.
- Summer – Danish Viking raiders under Sweyn Forkbeard continue to ravage the cities (mostly poorly defended) in southern England. A famine strikes Sweyn's army, which has to live off the land.
- November 16 – Ælfric of Abingdon, archbishop of Canterbury, leaves ships to the people of Wiltshire and Kent in his will, leaving the best, equipped for 60 men, to King Æthelred the Unready.
- High King of Ireland Brian Boru makes a second expedition to the north, to take hostages from the northern kingdoms. During this campaign he visits Armagh – making an offering of 20 ounces of gold to the church and confirming to the apostolic see of Saint Patrick, ecclesiastical supremacy over the whole of Ireland.

==== Asia ====
- January 13–18 – The Shanyuan Treaty is negotiated between the Liao dynasty and the Song dynasty. The Song government agrees to pay an annual tribute of 200,000 bolts of raw silk and 100,000 taels of silver, ending the northern border clashes against Liao.
- May 13 – The Japanese court permits Fujiwara no Korechika to enter the palace.
- Lê Trung Tông succeeds his father Lê Hoàn as emperor of the early Lê dynasty (modern Vietnam), preceding anarchy and 8 months succession war with other princes. Lê Ngoạ Triều succeeded his brother Lê Trung Tông, by assassinating him after just a 3 day reign.

=== By topic ===
==== Arts and literature ====
- The Shūi Wakashū ("Collection of Gleanings"), an anthology of waka (poetry), is compiled by ex-Emperor Kazan of Japan (approximate date).

== Births ==
- June 20 – al-Zahir li-i'zaz Din Allah, Fatimid caliph of Egypt (d. 1036)
- September 26 – Fujiwara no Nagaie, Japanese nobleman (d. 1064)
- A Nong, Chinese shaman and matriarch (approximate date)
- Berenguer Ramon I, Spanish nobleman (d. 1035)
- Bertha of Blois, duchess consort of Brittany (approximate date)
- Eilika of Schweinfurt, German noblewoman (approximate date)
- Frederick II, German nobleman and overlord (d. 1075)
- Llywelyn Aurdorchog, Welsh nobleman (approximate date)
- Macbeth ("Rí Deircc, the Red King"), king of Scotland (approximate date)
- Mahmud al-Kashgari, Turkish lexicographer (d. 1102)

== Deaths ==
- March 25 – Kenneth III ("An Donn, the Chief"), king of Scotland
- October 31 – Abe no Seimei, Japanese astrologer (b. 921)
- November 16 – Ælfric of Abingdon, archbishop of Canterbury
- December 14 – Adalbero II, bishop of Verdun and Metz
- December 27 – Nilus the Younger, Byzantine abbot (b. 910)
- Abu Hilal al-Askari, Muslim scholar and writer (b. 920)
- Cynan ap Hywel, prince of Gwynedd (approximate date)
- Lê Hoàn, emperor of the Early Lê dynasty (b. 941)
- Lê Trung Tông, emperor of the Early Lê dynasty (b. 983)
- Isma'il Muntasir ("Victorious"), ruler of the Samanids
- Mael Ruanaidh Ua Dubhda, king of Connacht
- Ma Yize, Muslim astronomer of the Song dynasty
- Ragnall mac Gofraid, king of the Isles (or 1004)
- Sigmundur Brestisson, Viking chieftain (b. 961)
- Yves de Bellême, Norman nobleman (approximate date)
