= Ibn Sahl =

Ibn Sahl may refer to:

- Ibn Sahl (mathematician) (c. 940–1000), Persian mathematician and optics engineer
- Ibn Sahl of Seville (1212–1251), Moorish poet of Andalusia
- Ahmed ibn Sahl al-Balkhi (850–934), Persian Muslim polymath
- Al-Fadl ibn Sahl (d. 818), Persian vizier of the Abbasid era
- Al-Hasan ibn Sahl (d. 833), Abbasid government official
- Ali ibn Sahl Rabban al-Tabari (838–870), Muslim hakim, Islamic scholar, physician and psychologist
- Shapur ibn Sahl (d. 869), Persian Christian physician

== See also ==
- Sahl (disambiguation)
