= Fujiwara no Tadaie =

Fujiwara no Tadaie 藤原忠家
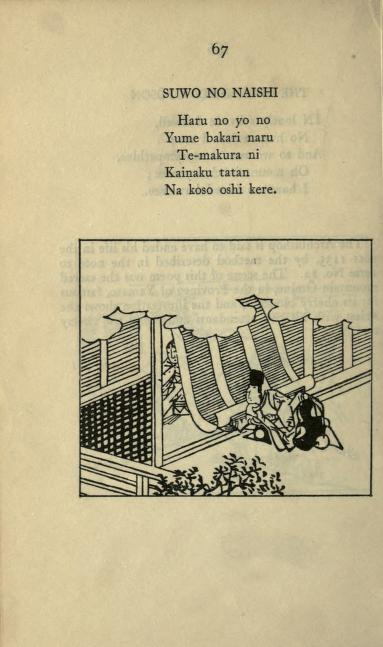
- Tadaie outside the screen
- Born: 1033
- Died: December 19, 1091 (aged 57–58)
- Father: Fujiwara no Nagaie

Fujiwara no Tadaie (藤原 忠家; 1033 – December 19, 1091), also known as Mikohidari Tadaie, was a Japanese statesman, courtier, politician, poet and calligrapher during the Heian period.

In 1090 he ordained as a Buddhist monk and undertook the precepts a year later. He died several months later.

== Career at court ==
He was a minister during the reigns of Emperor Go-Reizei, Emperor Shirakawa and Emperor Horikawa.

Tadaie did well at court, rising to the Senior Second Rank and the office of Dainagon (Major Counselor).

=== Poet ===
In this period of Japanese history, the duties of Imperial courtiers included an expectation that each would create and present poems.

An incident from Tadaie's life is featured in a poem which captured a fleeting moment and a gallant gesture:

Rōmaji	English
Haru no yo no Yume bakari naru Te-makura ni Kainaku tatan Na koso oshi kere	If I had made thy proffered arm A pillow for my head For but the moment's time, in which A summer's dream had fled, What would the world have said?

=== Calligrapher ===
Examples of calligraphy attributable to Tadaie are identified variously by the Japanese government as a "National Treasure", as an "Important Art Object" and as an "Important Cultural Property".

== Genealogy ==
Tadaie's grandfather was Fujiwara no Michinaga; and his father was Fujiwara no Nagaie. The son of Tadaie was Fujiwara no Toshitada (1071–1123). This lineage was identified as the Mikohidari lineage within the Hokke branch of the Fujiwara clan.

Tadaie was the grandfather of the poet Fujiwara no Toshinari (1114–1204), who was also known as Shunzei. Tadaie was the great-grandfather of Fujiwara no Sadaie, also known as Fujiwara no Teika.
