= 1123 =

1123 in various calendars
- Gregorian calendar: 1123; MCXXIII
- Ab urbe condita: 1876
- Armenian calendar: 572; ԹՎ ՇՀԲ
- Assyrian calendar: 5873
- Balinese saka calendar: 1044–1045
- Bengali calendar: 529–530
- Berber calendar: 2073
- English Regnal year: 23 Hen. 1 – 24 Hen. 1
- Buddhist calendar: 1667
- Burmese calendar: 485
- Byzantine calendar: 6631–6632
- Chinese calendar: 壬寅年 (Water Tiger); 3820 or 3613 — to — 癸卯年 (Water Rabbit); 3821 or 3614
- Coptic calendar: 839–840
- Discordian calendar: 2289
- Ethiopian calendar: 1115–1116
- Hebrew calendar: 4883–4884
- Hindu calendars
- Vikram Samvat: 1179–1180
- Shaka Samvat: 1044–1045
- Kali Yuga: 4223–4224
- Holocene calendar: 11123
- Igbo calendar: 123–124
- Iranian calendar: 501–502
- Islamic calendar: 516–517
- Japanese calendar: Hōan 4 (保安４年)
- Javanese calendar: 1028–1029
- Julian calendar: 1123; MCXXIII
- Korean calendar: 3456
- Minguo calendar: 789 before ROC 民前789年
- Nanakshahi calendar: −345
- Seleucid era: 1434/1435 AG
- Thai solar calendar: 1665–1666
- Tibetan calendar: ཆུ་ཕོ་སྟག་ལོ་ (male Water-Tiger); 1249 or 868 or 96 — to — ཆུ་མོ་ཡོས་ལོ་ (female Water-Hare); 1250 or 869 or 97

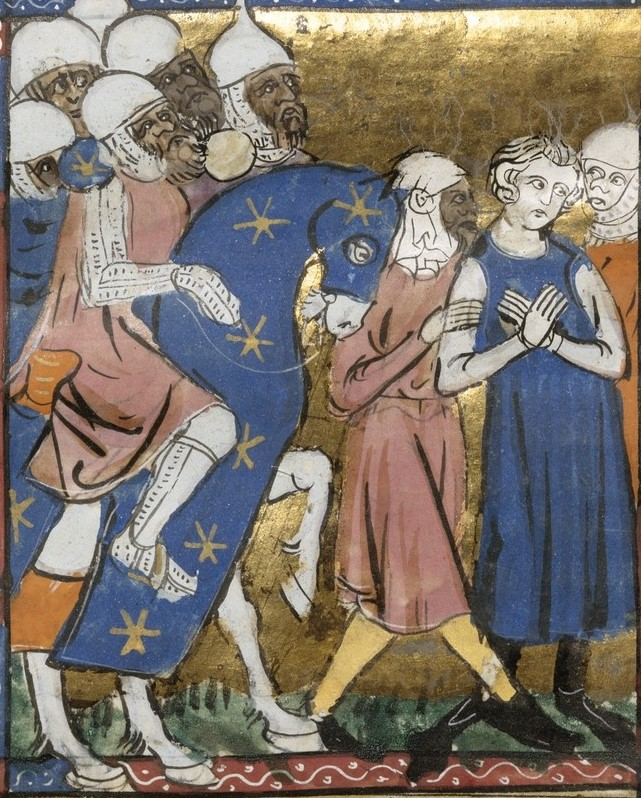
April 18: Baldwin II of Jerusalem is taken prisoner

Year 1123 (MCXXIII) was a common year starting on Monday of the Julian calendar.

== Events ==
=== By date ===
==== January–March ====
- January 29 – Frederick I, Archbishop of Bremen since 1104, dies after a reign of more than 18 years, and is succeeded by Adalbert II.
- February 25 – Japan's Emperor Toba abdicates in favor of his 3-year-old son Sutoku after a 16-year reign. The retired Emperor Shirakawa rules as regent during Toba's minority.
- March 18 –
  - The First Council of the Lateran convenes in Rome; it confirms the 1122 Concordat of Worms and demands clerical celibacy in the Catholic Church.
  - The coronation of Japan's Emperor Sutoku takes place.
- March 25 – St Bartholomew’s Hospital in London, commonly known as Barts, is founded by Rahere, a favourite courtier of King Henry I; it is now the oldest hospital in the United Kingdom operating on its original site.

==== April–June ====
- April 18 – King Baldwin II of Jerusalem is captured by Turkish forces under Belek Ghazi – while preparing to practice falconry near Gargar on the Euphrates. Most of the Crusader army is massacred, and Baldwin is taken to the castle at Kharput. To save the situation the Venetians are asked to help. Doge Domenico Michiel lifts the siege of Corfu (see 1122) and takes his fleet to Acre, arriving at the port in the end of May.
- May 9 – A fire in the city of Lincoln, England, nearly destroys the Lincolnshire town; it is memorialized 600 years later by historian Paul de Rapin.
- May 29 – Battle of Yibneh: A Crusader army led by Eustace Grenier defeats the Fatimid forces (16,000 men) near Ibelin. Despite the numerical superiority, Vizier Al-Ma'mun al-Bata'ihi is forced to withdraw to Egypt while his camp is plundered by the Crusaders. Eustace returns to Jerusalem in triumph, but later dies on June 15.
- May 30 – The Venetian fleet arrives at Ascalon and instantly sets about attacking the Fatimid fleet. The Egyptians fall into a trap, caught between two Venetian squadrons, and are destroyed or captured. While sailing back to Acre, the Venetians capture a merchant-fleet of ten richly laden vessels.
- May – Baldwin II and Joscelin I are rescued by 50 Armenian soldiers (disguised as monks and merchants) at Kharput. They kill the guards, and infiltrate the castle where the prisoners are kept. Joscelin escapes to seek help. However, the castle is soon besieged by Turkish forces under Belek Ghazi – and is after some time recaptured. Baldwin and Waleran of Le Puiset are moved for greater safety to the castle of Harran.
- June – King David IV of Georgia, nicknamed "Davit IV Aghmashenebeli" ("David the Builder") by his subjects, defeats Sultan Mahmud II of the Seljuk Empire (encompassing much of what is now Iraq and Iran).

==== July–September ====
- July 22 – William de Corbeil is installed as the new Archbishop of Canterbury, the highest-ranking cleric in England, after his February 4 election is approved by Pope Callixtus II.
- August 9 – Battle of Al-Dimas: An Italo-Norman campaign in North Africa ends with their troops being massacred by Zirid forces near Mahdia (modern Tunisia).
- August 29 – King Eystein I (Magnusson) dies during a feast at Hustad after a 20-year reign, leaving his brother Sigurd the Crusader to rule over Norway.
- September 27 – Prince Wuqimai of the House of Wanyan becomes the new Emperor of China after the death, on September 19, of his elder brother, the Emperor Taizu, founder of the Jin dynasty. Wuqimai is proclaimed the Emperor Taizong of Jin.

==== October–December ====
- October 7 – Pope Calixtus II issues the papal bull Aequitatis et justitiae, placing the Roman Catholic Diocese of Tricarico in Italy under the protection of the papacy.
- November 12 – In Spain, Queen Urraca of León and Castile, the self-proclaimed Imperator totius Hispaniae ("Empress of All Spain"), formally acknowledges 8-year-old Fernando Pérez de Lara as her son and an heir, after he was born out of wedlock from her relationship with Count Pedro González de Lara.
- December 12 – At Sankt Veit an der Glan, Engelbert II of the House of Sponheim becomes the new Duke of Carinthia and the Margrave of Verona (an area encompassing parts of Austria, Slovenia and Italy) upon the death of his older brother Henry IV.

=== By place ===
==== Middle East ====
- The Pactum Warmundi: A treaty of alliance, is established between the Kingdom of Jerusalem and the Republic of Venice at Acre. The Venetians receive a street, with a church, baths and a bakery, free of all obligations, in every town of the kingdom. They are also excused of all tolls and taxes.

==== Europe ====
- Sigurd I performs a Crusade, the Kalmare ledung, to Christianize the Swedish province of Småland. He makes a pact with King Niels of Denmark.

=== By topic ===
==== Religion ====
- Diego Gelmírez, archbishop of Santiago de Compostela, declares a Crusade in Al-Andalus (modern Spain) against the Almoravids.
- Furness Abbey (or St Mary of Furness) is founded in England by Stephen, count of Boulogne, for the Order of Savigny.

== Births ==
- March 29 – Shi Zong (or Wulu), Chinese emperor (d. 1189)
- Minamoto no Yoshitomo, Japanese general (d. 1160)
- Osbern of Gloucester, English lexicographer (d. 1200)
- Parakramabahu I, Sri Lankan king of Polonnaruwa (d. 1186)
- Robert I (the Great), count of Dreux (approximate date)

== Deaths ==
- February 9 – Otto (the Rich), count of Ballenstedt (b. 1070)
- March 4 – Peter of Pappacarbone, Italian abbot and bishop
- May 3 – Felicia of Roucy, queen of Aragon and Navarre
- June 15 – Eustace Grenier, French constable and regent
- July 18 – Bruno di Segni, Italian prelate and bishop
- August 29 – Eystein I (Magnusson), king of Norway
- September 11 – Marbodius of Rennes, French archdeacon
- September 19 – Taizu, emperor of the Jin Dynasty (b. 1068)
- September 27 – Fujiwara no Akisue, Japanese nobleman (b. 1055)
- December 14 – Henry IV, duke of Carinthia (House of Sponheim)
- Davyd Sviatoslavich, Kievan prince of Murom and Chernigov
- Henry II, margrave of Meissen and the Saxon Ostmark (b. 1103)
- Langri Tangpa, Tibetan Buddhist monk and master (b. 1054)
- Louis the Springer (or Leaper), German nobleman (b. 1042)
