= 984 =

Calendar year

984 in various calendars
Gregorian calendar	984; CMLXXXIV
Ab urbe condita	1737
Armenian calendar	433; ԹՎ ՆԼԳ
Assyrian calendar	5734
Balinese saka calendar	905–906
Bengali calendar	390–391
Berber calendar	1934
Buddhist calendar	1528
Burmese calendar	346
Byzantine calendar	6492–6493
Chinese calendar	癸未年 (Water Goat); 3681 or 3474 — to — 甲申年 (Wood Monkey); 3682 or 3475
Coptic calendar	700–701
Discordian calendar	2150
Ethiopian calendar	976–977
Hebrew calendar	4744–4745
- Hindu calendars
Vikram Samvat	1040–1041
Shaka Samvat	905–906
Kali Yuga	4084–4085
Holocene calendar	10984
Iranian calendar	362–363
Islamic calendar	373–374
Japanese calendar	Eikan 2 (永観２年)
Javanese calendar	885–886
Julian calendar	984; CMLXXXIV
Korean calendar	3317
Minguo calendar	928 before ROC 民前928年
Nanakshahi calendar	−484
Seleucid era	1295/1296 AG
Thai solar calendar	1526–1527
Tibetan calendar	ཆུ་མོ་ལུག་ལོ་ (female Water-Sheep); 1110 or 729 or −43 — to — ཤིང་ཕོ་སྤྲེ་ལོ་ (male Wood-Monkey); 1111 or 730 or −42

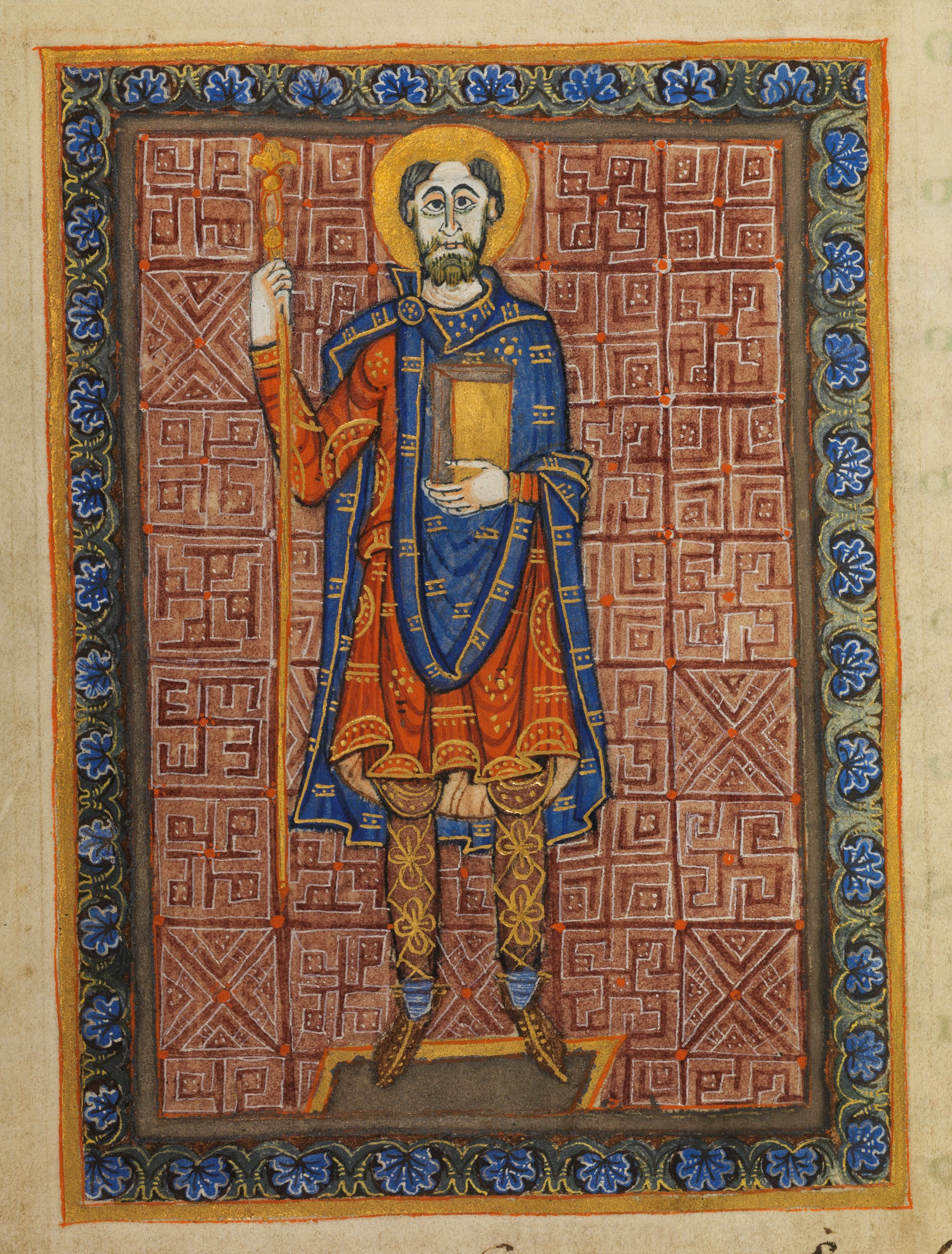
Henry II, Duke of Bavaria

Year 984 (CMLXXXIV) was a leap year starting on Tuesday of the Julian calendar.

== Events ==
=== By place ===
==== Europe ====
- Spring – German boy-king Otto III (4 years old) is seized by the deposed Henry II, Duke of Bavaria ("the Wrangler"), who has recovered his duchy and claims the regency as a member of the Ottonian Dynasty. But Henry is forced to hand over Otto to his mother, empress consort Theophanu.
- King Ramiro III of León loses his throne to Bermudo II (the rival king of Galicia), who also becomes ruler of the entire Kingdom of León (modern-day Spain).

==== Japan ====
- Fall – Emperor En'yū abdicates the throne in favor of his 16-year-old son Kazan after a 15-year reign. En'yū retires and becomes a Buddhist priest.

=== By topic ===
==== Technology ====
- Qiao Weiyue, a Chinese engineer, innovates the first known use of the double-gated canal pound lock during the Song dynasty, for adjusting different water levels in segments of the Grand Canal in China.

==== Religion ====
- August 20 – Pope John XIV dies a prisoner in the Castel Sant'Angelo at Rome after a 1-year reign, having either been murdered or starved to death.
- Anti-Pope Boniface VII returns from Constantinople and gains support from the powerful Roman Crescentii family. He takes hold of the papal throne.

== Births ==
- Abu al-Qasim Muhammad ibn Abbad, founder of the Abbadid dynasty (d. 1042)
- Choe Chung, Korean Confucian scholar and poet (d. 1068)
- Emma of Normandy, noblewoman, queen consort of England (twice), Denmark and Norway (d. 1052; approximate date)

== Deaths ==
- July 7 – Crescentius the Elder, Roman politician and aristocrat
- July 18 – Dietrich I, bishop of Metz
- August 1 – Æthelwold, bishop of Winchester
- August 20 – John XIV, pope of the Catholic Church
- September 9 – Warin, archbishop of Cologne
- Buluggin ibn Ziri, ruler (emir) of the Zirid Dynasty
- Domnall Claen, king of Leinster (Ireland)
- Edith of Wilton, English princess and abbess
- Eochaid Ua Floinn, Irish poet (approximate date)
- Gerberga, Frankish queen (approximate date)
- Jordan, bishop of Poland (or 982)
- Miró III, count of Cerdanya and Besalú (b. 920)
- Ragnhild Eriksdotter, Norse Viking noblewoman
- Shi Shouxin, Chinese general (b. 928)
