= 1122 =

1122 in various calendars
- Gregorian calendar: 1122; MCXXII
- Ab urbe condita: 1875
- Armenian calendar: 571; ԹՎ ՇՀԱ
- Assyrian calendar: 5872
- Balinese saka calendar: 1043–1044
- Bengali calendar: 528–529
- Berber calendar: 2072
- English Regnal year: 22 Hen. 1 – 23 Hen. 1
- Buddhist calendar: 1666
- Burmese calendar: 484
- Byzantine calendar: 6630–6631
- Chinese calendar: 辛丑年 (Metal Ox); 3819 or 3612 — to — 壬寅年 (Water Tiger); 3820 or 3613
- Coptic calendar: 838–839
- Discordian calendar: 2288
- Ethiopian calendar: 1114–1115
- Hebrew calendar: 4882–4883
- Hindu calendars
- Vikram Samvat: 1178–1179
- Shaka Samvat: 1043–1044
- Kali Yuga: 4222–4223
- Holocene calendar: 11122
- Igbo calendar: 122–123
- Iranian calendar: 500–501
- Islamic calendar: 515–516
- Japanese calendar: Hōan 3 (保安３年)
- Javanese calendar: 1027–1028
- Julian calendar: 1122; MCXXII
- Korean calendar: 3455
- Minguo calendar: 790 before ROC 民前790年
- Nanakshahi calendar: −346
- Seleucid era: 1433/1434 AG
- Thai solar calendar: 1664–1665
- Tibetan calendar: ལྕགས་མོ་གླང་ལོ་ (female Iron-Ox); 1248 or 867 or 95 — to — ཆུ་ཕོ་སྟག་ལོ་ (male Water-Tiger); 1249 or 868 or 96

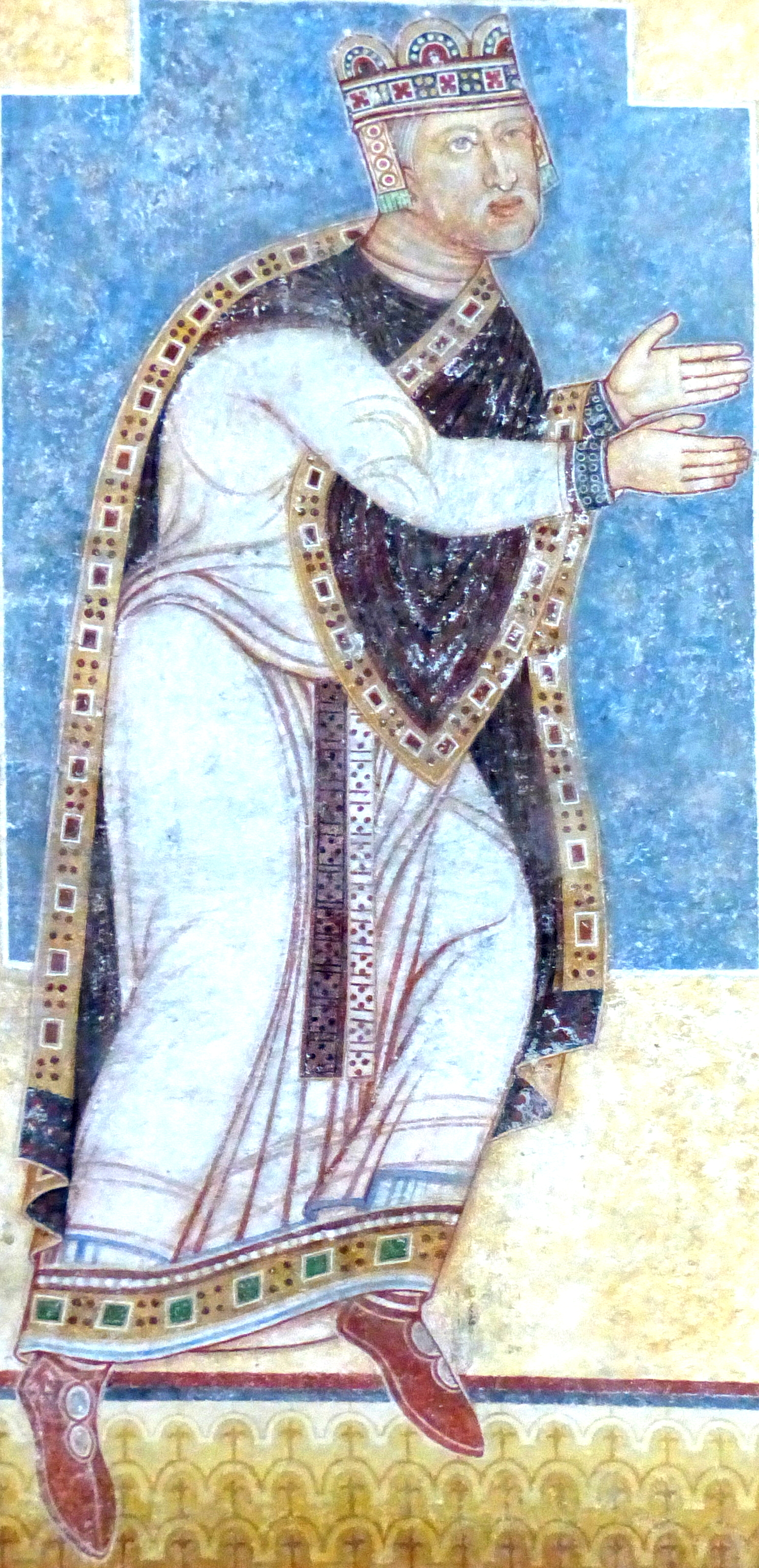
Henry V, Holy Roman Emperor (r. 1111–1125) ends his conflict with the Church this year

Year 1122 (MCXXII) was a common year starting on Sunday of the Julian calendar.

== Events ==
=== By place ===
==== Byzantine Empire ====
- Battle of Beroia: Emperor John II Komnenos transfers the Byzantine field army from Asia Minor (where it has been engaged in fighting the Seljuk Turks) to the Balkans. The Pechenegs who have set up their camp (defended by a circular formation of wagons) near Beroia (modern Bulgaria) are defeated. John orders the Varangian Guard (some 480 men), the elite Palace Guard to hack their way through the Pecheneg circle of wagons, causing a general rout in their camp. Pecheneg survivors are taken captive and enlisted in the Byzantine army.

==== Egypt ====
- February 13 – Al-Ma'mun al-Bata'ihi is formally proclaimed vizier of the Fatimid Caliphate by Caliph al-Amir.

==== Levant ====
- September 13 – Count Joscelin I and Waleran of Le Puiset are taken prisoner by Turkish forces led by Belek Ghazi near Saruj in northern Syria. Belek offers Joscelin liberty in return for the cession of Edessa. He refuses to accept these terms; Joscelin and Waleran and 60 other Crusaders are taken to the castle at Kharput.

==== Europe ====
- August 8 – A Venetian fleet under Doge Domenico Michiel with well over a hundred ships sets sail from Venice, carrying an army of around 15,000 men and siege-material on the Venetian Crusade. The fleet departs for Palestine – but the Venetians pause to attack Corfu (this in retaliation for the refusal of John II to renew exclusive trading privileges). For six months, throughout the winter of 1122–23, the Venetians lay siege to the Byzantine island.
- King Alfonso the Battler of Aragon creates the lay community of knights known as the Confraternity of Belchite. It is the first local attempt to imitate the Order of the Knights Templar created in Palestine.
- The Almoravid fleet attacks Sicily to suppress the Italo-Norman raiders. The same year the Muslim population of Malta rebels against the Normans.

==== Eurasia ====
- Siege of Tbilisi: The Georgians led by King David IV ('the Builder') re-conquer the city of Tbilisi from the Emirate of Tbilisi after a 1-year siege. David makes it his capital and unifies the Georgian State.

=== By topic ===
==== Religion ====
- September 23 – The Concordat of Worms: Emperor Henry V recognizes freedom of election of the clergy and promises to restore all Church property. This brings an end to the power struggle between the papacy and the Holy Roman Empire, known as the Investiture Controversy. In the aftermath, Cappenberg Abbey is founded by Count Gottfried II for the new order of Premonstratensians.
- The construction of the temple complex of Angkor Wat in the Khmer Empire starts.

== Births ==
- February 24 – Wanyan Liang, Chinese emperor (d. 1161)
- date unknown
  - Frederick I (Barbarossa), Holy Roman Emperor (d. 1190)
  - Fujiwara no Kiyoko, Japanese empress consort (d. 1182)
  - Ibn Hubal, Arab physician and scientist (approximate date)
  - Isaac ben Abba Mari, French Jewish rabbi (approximate date)
  - Jayavarman VII, Cambodian ruler of the Khmer Empire (d. 1218))

== Deaths ==
- January 18 – Christina Ingesdotter, Kievan princess
- March 12 – Giso IV, count of Gudensberg (b. 1070)
- August 9 – Cuno of Praeneste, German cardinal
- September 9 – Al-Hariri of Basra, Abbasid poet (b. 1054)
- September 16 – Vitalis of Savigny, Catholic French Saint and itinerant preacher (b. 1060)
- October 20 – Ralph d'Escures, English archbishop
- November 8 – Ilghazi, Artuqid ruler of Mardin
- November 28 – Ottokar II, margrave of Styria
- December 3 – Berthold III, duke of Zähringen
- December 4 – Henry III, duke of Carinthia
- date unknown
  - Al-Baghawi, Persian hadith scholar and writer
  - Alberada of Buonalbergo, duchess of Apulia
  - John of Tours, Bishop of Wells
  - Sybilla of Normandy, queen of Scotland
  - Yejong, Korean ruler of Goryeo (b. 1079)
  - Wang Cha-ji, Korean general (b. 1066)
