= 994 =

Calendar year

994 in various calendars
- Gregorian calendar: 994; CMXCIV
- Ab urbe condita: 1747
- Armenian calendar: 443; ԹՎ ՆԽԳ
- Assyrian calendar: 5744
- Balinese saka calendar: 915–916
- Bengali calendar: 400–401
- Berber calendar: 1944
- Buddhist calendar: 1538
- Burmese calendar: 356
- Byzantine calendar: 6502–6503
- Chinese calendar: 癸巳年 (Water Snake); 3691 or 3484 — to — 甲午年 (Wood Horse); 3692 or 3485
- Coptic calendar: 710–711
- Discordian calendar: 2160
- Ethiopian calendar: 986–987
- Hebrew calendar: 4754–4755
- Hindu calendars
- Vikram Samvat: 1050–1051
- Shaka Samvat: 915–916
- Kali Yuga: 4094–4095
- Holocene calendar: 10994
- Iranian calendar: 372–373
- Islamic calendar: 383–384
- Japanese calendar: Shōryaku 5 (正暦５年)
- Javanese calendar: 895–896
- Julian calendar: 994; CMXCIV
- Korean calendar: 3327
- Minguo calendar: 918 before ROC 民前918年
- Nanakshahi calendar: −474
- Seleucid era: 1305/1306 AG
- Thai solar calendar: 1536–1537
- Tibetan calendar: ཆུ་མོ་སྦྲུལ་ལོ་ (female Water-Snake); 1120 or 739 or −33 — to — ཤིང་ཕོ་རྟ་ལོ་ (male Wood-Horse); 1121 or 740 or −32

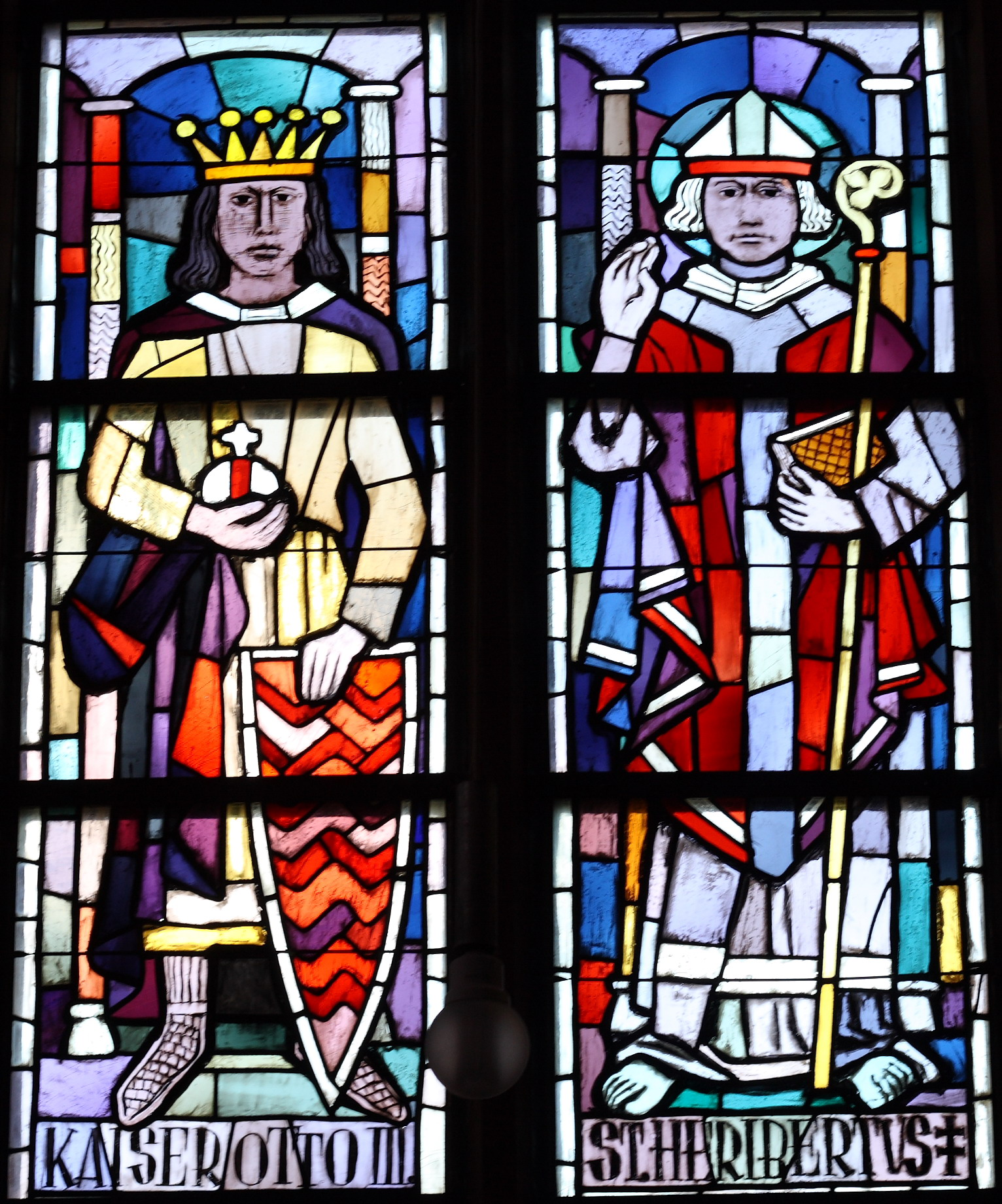
King Otto III (left) and Heribert of Cologne

Year 994 (CMXCIV) was a common year starting on Monday of the Julian calendar.

== Events ==
=== By place ===
==== Byzantine Empire ====
- September 15 – Battle of the Orontes: Fatimid forces, under Turkish general Manjutakin (also the governor of Damascus), besiege Apamea (modern Syria). Emperor Basil II sends a Byzantine expeditionary army, led by Dux Michael Bourtzes, to relieve the city in alliance with the Hamdanid Dynasty. Manjutakin defeats the Hamdanids with his forces and attacks the Byzantine force in the rear. The Byzantine army panics and flees, losing some 5,000 men in the process.

==== Europe ====
- June 23 – Viking Age: Danish Viking raiders, (probably) under King Sweyn Forkbeard, plunder the city of Stade (Lower Saxony). Count Lothair Udo I is captured and killed, during the battle with the pirates.
- September – King Otto III, now 14 years old, receives the regalia to rule the Kingdom of Germany at an assembly of the Imperial Diet in Solingen. Otto appoints Heribert of Cologne as chancellor of Italy.

==== Egypt ====
- Egyptian politician Isa ibn Nasturus ibn Surus appointed Vizier of Egypt.

==== England ====
- A Danish Viking fleet, under Olaf Tryggvason, sails up the Thames Estuary, and besieges London. King Æthelred II (the Unready) pays Olaf 16,000 lbs of silver (Danegeld).
- Olaf Tryggvason, already a baptised Christian, is confirmed as Christian in a ceremony at Andover. After receiving gifts from Æthelred II, Olaf leaves for Norway.

=== By topic ===
==== Astronomy ====
- An increase in carbon-14 concentration, recorded in tree rings, suggests that a strong solar storm may have hit the Earth in either 993 or 994.

== Births ==
- November 7 – Ibn Hazm, Andalusian historian and poet (d. 1064)
- Ahmad al-Bayhaqi, Persian Sunni hadith scholar (d. 1066)
- Alfonso V (the Noble), king of León (Spain) (d. 1028)
- Lothair Udo I, margrave of the Nordmark (d. 1057)
- Sancho III (the Great), king of Pamplona (approximate date)
- Simeon, Norman abbot of Ely Abbey (approximate date)
- Wallada bint al-Mustakfi, Andalusian female poet (d. 1091)

== Deaths ==
- February 3 – William IV, duke of Aquitaine (b. 937)
- April 4 – Egbert (the One-Eyed), German nobleman
- April 23 – Gerard of Toul, German priest and bishop
- May 11 – Majolus of Cluny, Frankish priest and abbot
- June 23 – Lothair Udo I, German nobleman (b. 950)
- June 24 – Abu Isa al-Warraq, Arab scholar (b. 889)
- July 8 – Richardis, margravine consort of Austria
- July 10 – Leopold I, margrave of Austria (b. 940)
- October 28 – Sigeric, archbishop of Canterbury
- October 31 – Wolfgang, bishop of Regensburg
- Bagrat II, king of Iberia-Kartli (Georgia) (b. 937)
- Fujiwara no Takamitsu, Japanese waka poet
- Ibn Juljul, Andalusian physician (approximate date)
- Sancho Garcés II, king of Navarre (Spain)
