= Solomon ben Samson =

Scholar from Worms in the 11th century

Solomon ben Samson was a scholar of Worms in the eleventh century.

He was a teacher and relative of Rashi, who refers to him as an authority beside his other teacher, Isaac ha-Levi. Most probably he is identical with the Solomon ben Samson mentioned as a native of Vitry, this name being apparently an error for Lorraine, among whose scholars he is cited.
