= Kentish Revolt of 1067 =

Insurrection against William the Conqueror

The Kentish Revolt of 1067 was a short-lived insurrection against the newly-installed Norman regime of William the Conqueror, culminating in an unsuccessful attack on Dover Castle. It was led by one of William's most powerful magnates, Eustace II, Count of Boulogne, who was in command of not only the local Kentish insurgents but also his own personal forces. Their rapid defeat by the Norman garrison at Dover ended the first substantial threat William had faced since he had gained the English throne.

== Background ==
William the Conqueror's victory at Hastings and his subsequent coronation on Christmas Day, 1066 left him in a position to confiscate huge tracts of land from those Anglo-Saxon families that had been in arms against him and to redistribute some of them to his supporters. Three of the main beneficiaries were his friend and counsellor William fitz Osbern; his half-brother Odo, Bishop of Bayeux; and his ally Eustace II, Count of Boulogne. Odo's share was the county of Kent in its entirety, and he based himself at Dover Castle

In March 1067 the king returned to Normandy for an extended visit, leaving the government of England in the hands of Odo and William fitz Osbern. These men and their officials administered justice zealously against fierce men, as the contemporary writer William of Poitiers reported, or alternatively, swollen with pride, sided with their rapacious subordinates against the oppressed English people, as the later Orderic Vitalis wrote. "Things went ever from bad to worse", complained the Anglo-Saxon Chronicle. "When God wills may the end be good!".

== Outbreak of the revolt ==
With the whole country in a state of simmering potential rebellion, Odo took many of his knights from Dover Castle and crossed the Thames. The men of Kent took advantage of his absence to rise in revolt and appeal to Eustace for his help in capturing Dover. They chose him, William of Poitiers tells us, because "they knew by experience of his prowess in war and fortune in battle. They thought that if they were not to serve one of their own countrymen, they would rather serve a neighbour whom they knew." It was, even so, a strange decision for Anglo-Saxon insurgents. Eustace had fought by the king's side at the Battle of Hastings, had possibly even been one of the men who personally killed Harold Godwinson, and had many years before in 1051 massacred many of the citizens of Dover in an eruption of street violence there. The 19th-century historian Edward Freeman, in his History of the Norman Conquest, called him "a stranger who had done greater despite to Englishmen than any other man living", and could only suppose that "men's minds must have reached that state when any change seems as if it must be a change for the better". Eustace's motive for joining the rebels is generally taken to have been dissatisfaction with the amount of land the king had rewarded him with, though it is also possible that the death on 1 September 1067 of his overlord, Baldwin V, Count of Flanders, father-in-law of William the Conqueror, freed his hands. If so, his next move can be dated to the autumn of 1067.

== Attack on Dover Castle ==
Eustace, with a considerable number of his knights, crossed the English Channel and joined forces with the men of Kent. Instead of waiting to be reinforced by further rebels coming in from the surrounding countryside, Eustace decided on an immediate attack on Dover, which was beaten off by the reduced garrison. Retreating from the Norman defenders, Orderic tells us, "the fugitives, imagining that the Bishop of Bayeux had arrived with a strong force, lost their heads, and in panic went rushing down the precipice of the trackless cliffs, to perish more shamefully through this short cut than from the enemy's sword." Eustace made good his escape to Boulogne, though his illegitimate son Geoffrey was captured; the Kentish rebels dispersed and the crisis was over. Eustace was banished and dispossessed at William's Christmas court that year, though his lands were later restored.
