= Abu al-Hakam al-Kirmani =

Philosopher and scholar from the Muslim al-Andalus, 970–1066

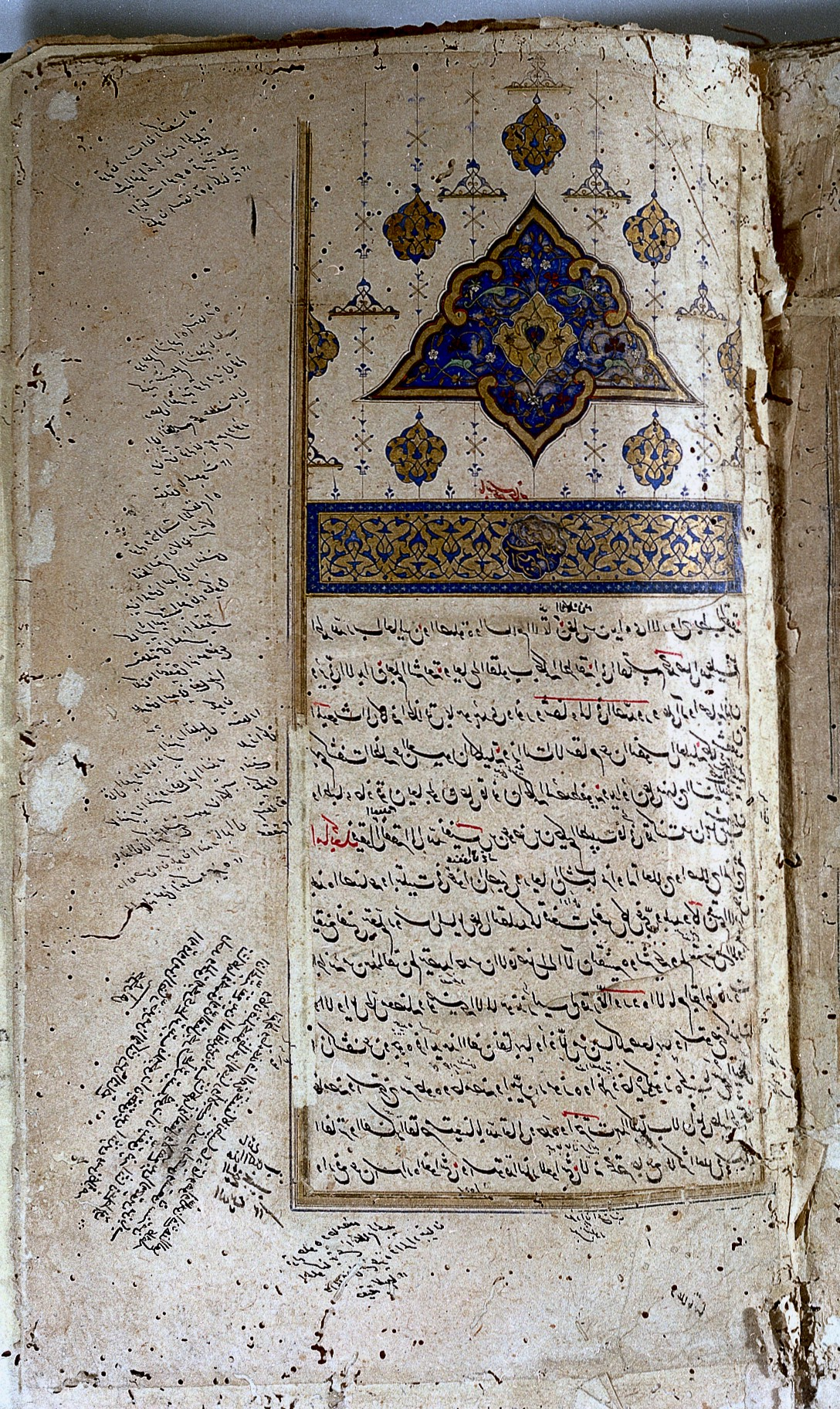
Al-Kirmani, Commentary on 'Causes and symptoms'

Abu al-Hakam al-Kirmani (Arabic: أبو الحكم الكرماني; 970–1066) was a prominent philosopher and scholar from al-Andalus. He was born in Cordoba but lived most of his life in Zaragoza after a journey in the East where he studied in Harran. He was student of Maslamah Ibn Ahmad al-Majriti and was a Neoplatonic advocate, and seen as an influence on Ibn 'Arabi. But he also wrote extensively on geometry and logic. His exact date of death is not known as he fled to Morocco in the 11th century. It is said that he was the first to bring the Epistles of the Brethren of Purity to al-Andalus.
