= Nazif ibn Yumn =

Nazif ibn Yumn al-qass al-Rūmī al-Baghdādī (died 990) was a Melkite Christian priest, philosopher and physician.

He flourished under the Buyid emir Adud al-Dawla. He was also a translator of Greek into Arabic, translating the Tenth book of Euclid.
