= Muhammad ibn Yusuf al-Ilaqi =

Persian physician

Muḥammad ibn Yusuf al-Ilāqī
- Born: c. 1068; Ilaq, Transoxiana (modern day Uzbekistan)
- Died: c. 1141 near Samarkand (modern day Uzbekistan)
- Years active: 11th century
- Medical career
- Notable works: Kitāb al-Fuṣūl al-Ilāqiyya ("The Aphorisms of al-Ilāqī"); Kitāb al-asbāb wa-al-`alāmāt ("The Book of Causes and Symptoms")

Muḥammad ibn Yusuf al-Ilāqī was an eleventh-century physician from Khorasan.

Contrary to Carl Brockelmann's information (GAL 1:485; Suppl. 1:887), Sharaf al-Zamān Muḥammad ibn ʿAlī al-Īlāqī of Bākharz (in Khorasān, Iran), who was most probably active in Balkh (today's Afghanistan), was not a figure of the 6th/12th century. He did not die in 536/1141 (in the battle of the Qatwan steppe) but most probably around 460/1068 and should be counted among Avicenna's (d. 429/1037) direct students.

Al-Ilāqī produced an epitome of the first book of the Canons of Medicine by Avicenna which was known under various titles: Kitāb al-Fuṣūl al-Ilāqiyya ("The Aphorisms of al-Ilāqī") and Kitāb al-asbāb wa-al-`alāmāt ("The Book of Causes and Symptoms"). Al-Ilāqī's greatly abbreviated version of the first book of the Canon was very popular, and many copies have survived.

== Bibliography ==
- Richard Sellheim, Verzeichnis der orientalischen Handschriften in Deutschland. Band XVII. Reihe 4. Arabische Handschriften. Materialien zur arabischen Literaturgeschichte (Wiesbaden: F. Steiner, 1976), 147.
- Carl Brockelmann, Geschichte der arabischen Litteratur, 1st edition, 2 vols. (Leiden: Brill, 1889–1936). Second edition, 2 vols. (Leiden: Brill, 1943–49). Page references will be to those of the first edition, with the 2nd edition page numbers given in parentheses., vol. 1, p. 485 (638).
- Carl Brockelmann, Geschichte der arabischen Litteratur, Supplement, 3 vols. (Leiden: Brill, 1937–1942)., vol. 1, p. 887.
- D.M. Schullian and F.E. Sommer, A Catalogue of Incunabula and Manuscripts in the Army Medical Library (New York: Henry Schuman, [1950]), p. 325).
- Lutz Richter-Bernburg, "Iran's Contribution to Medicine and Veterinary Science in Islam AD 100-900/AD 700-1500", in The Diffusion of Greco-Roman Medicine in the Middle East and the Caucasus, ed. J.A.C. Greppin, E. Savage-Smith, and J.L. Gueriguian (New York: Caravan Press, 1999).
- Dimitri Gutas, "Notes & Texts for Cairo MSS, II", Manuscripts of the Middle East, vol. 2 (1987), p. 15 note 13.
- A. Z. Iskandar, A Catalogue of Arabic Manuscripts on Medicine and Science in the Wellcome Historical Medical Library (London: The Wellcome Historical Medical Library, 1967)., pp. 51–2.
