= Wang Chaji =

Korean military officer (1066–1122)

- Born: 1066; Haeju, Goryeo
- Died: March 30, 1122 (aged 55–56); Gaegyeong, Goryeo
- Occupations: Politician; General
- Spouse: Lady Kim of the Gyeongju Kim clan
- Children: Wang Ŭi (son); Lady Wang (daughter)
- Relatives: Lady Wang (older sister); Lady Sŏ (daughter-in-law); Yi Kongŭi (son-in-law); Sŏ Kyun (in-law); Yi Chagyŏm (in-law)

Korean name
- Hangul: 왕자지
- Hanja: 王字之
- RR: Wang Jaji
- MR: Wang Chaji

Courtesy name
- Hangul: 원장
- Hanja: 元長
- RR: Wonjang
- MR: Wŏnjang

Posthumous name
- Hangul: 장순
- Hanja: 章順
- RR: Jangsun
- MR: Changsun

Childhood name
- Hangul: 소중
- Hanja: 紹中
- RR: Sojung
- MR: Sojung

Wang Chaji (Korean: 왕자지; Hanja: 王字之; 1066 – 30 March 1122 (Note: In the Korean calendar (lunisolar), he died on the 24th day of the 3rd month, 1122.)) was a Korean politician, general, and ambassador during the Goryeo period. He was the deputy of military commander Yun Kwan and trained seventeen-thousand Jurchen soldiers from 1100 to 1108.

== Biography ==
Wang Chaji was from Haeju. His ancestors were originally surnamed Pak, but his great-grandfather Pak Yu (박유; 朴儒) changed his surname from Pak to Wang. Later he helped his brother-in-law Wang Kungmo (왕국모; 王國髦) in a military coup and the killing of Yi Chaŭi (이자의; 李資義).

During the reign of King Sukjong he was appointed as a palace attendant (내시; 內侍; Naesi). In 1108 he was appointed to Pyŏngmap'an'gwan (병마판관; 兵馬判官) and entourage to General Yun Kwan.

He successively filled various government posts, including Deputy Director of the Palace Directorate (전중소감; 殿中少監; Chŏnjungsogam), Director of the Palace Directorate (전중감; 殿中監; Chŏnjunggam), Director of the Office of Guest Affairs (예빈시경; 禮賓侍卿; Yebinsigyŏng), and Administrator of Memorials of the Security Council (추밀원지주사; 樞密院知奏事; Ch'umirwŏnjijusa).

In 1115, he was appointed as Minister of Personnel (이부상서; 吏部尙書; Ibusangsŏ) and envoy to China's Song dynasty. Thereafter in 1117 he was the Left Policy Advisor (좌산기상시; 左散騎常侍; Chwasan'gisangsi) and Associate Commissioner of the Security Council (추밀원동지사; 樞密院同知事; Ch'umirwŏndongjisa). In 1122, he was the Minister of Personnel, Assistant Executive in Political Affairs (참지정사; 參知政事; Ch'amjijŏngsa) and Superintendent of the Ministry of Revenue (호부판사; 戶部判事; Hobup'ansa). He died that year at age 56.

== See also ==
- Yun Kwan
