= Akkadevi =

- Sri Gunadabedangi; Princess of the Western Chalukya Dynasty
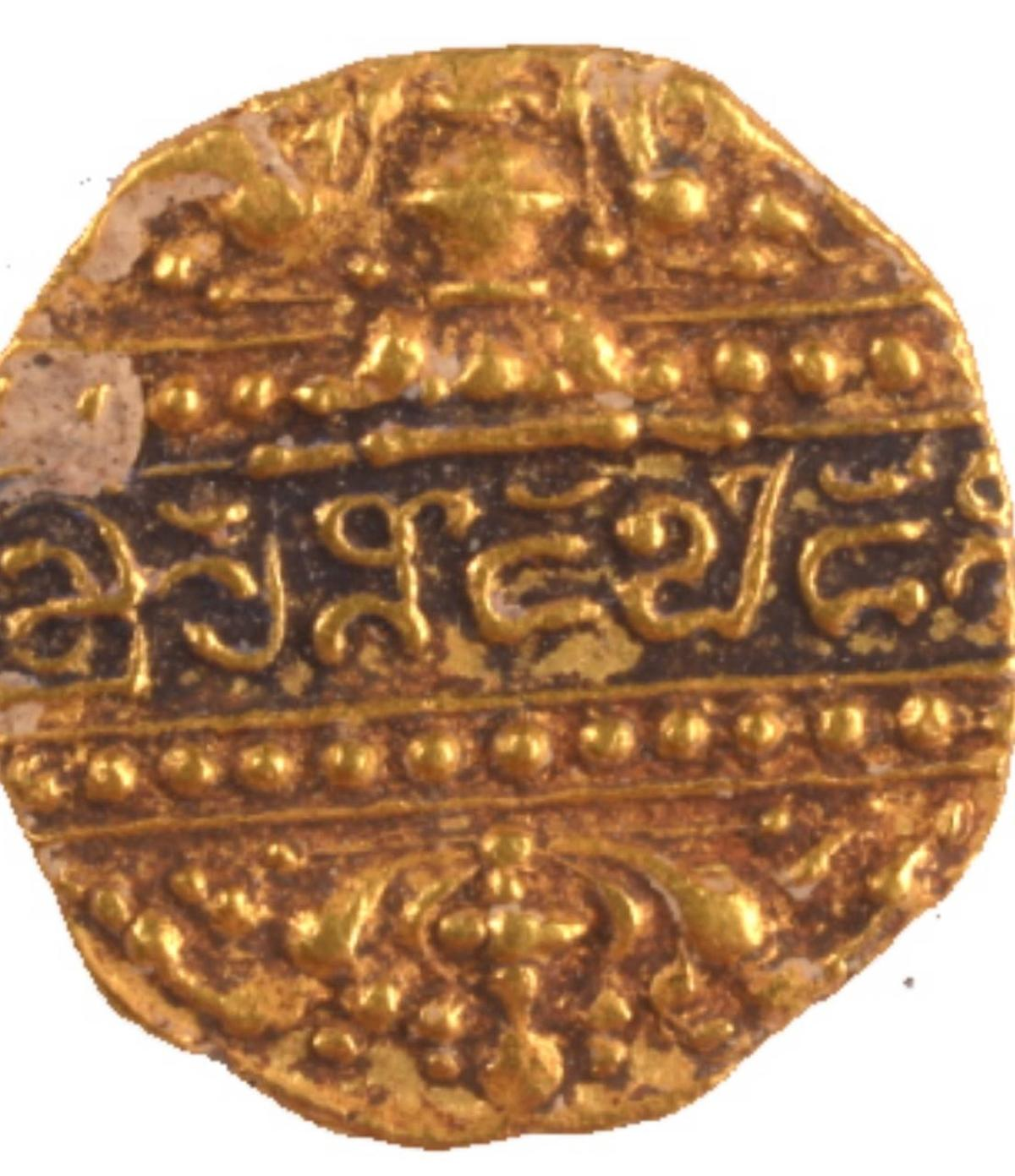
- Born: 1010
- Died: 1064 (aged 53–54)
- House: Chalukya

Akkadevi (ಆಕ್ಕದೀವಿ in Kannada, also Akkādēvi, Akkā-dēvi), 1010–1064 CE was a princess of the Chalukya dynasty of Karnataka and governor of an area known as Kishukādu, situated in the present day districts of Bidar, Bagalkot and Bijapur. She was the sister of King Jayasimha II of the Western Chalukyas, and aunt of Someshvara I.

Akkadevi was well known for being a competent administrator and capable general. She was also called Gunadabedangi, meaning "beauty of virtues".

The rule of the Chalukyas marks an important milestone in the history of South India and a golden age in the history of Karnataka. The Chalukyas ruled over the Deccan plateau in India for over 600 years. Akkadevi was part of the Western Chalukya Empire, who was in constant conflict with the Cholas, and with their distant cousins, the Eastern Chalukyas of Vengi.

In the course of Akkadevi's rule, she expanded her province, encouraged education through grants, and gave generously to Jaina and Hindu temples.

Akkadevi was said to be "a personage of great reputation and consequence". An inscription dated 1022 calls her as courageous as Bhairavi in war. She laid siege to the fort of Gōkāge or Gōkāk to quell a local rebellion, and is said to have encouraged education by giving grants to Brahmins.
