= Dub dá Leithe =

- Died: 1064
- Other name: Dubhdalethe

Dub dá Leithe or Dubhdalethe (died 1064) was Abbot of Armagh.

== Biography ==
Dub dá Leithe was the son of Maelmuire, son of Eochaidh, and thus a member of Clann Sinaig. He had been fer léigind (ferleighinn), or lector, at Armagh, Ireland. In 1049, on the death of Amalgaidh (Amalgaid mac Máel Muire), coarb or successor of Saint Patrick, he became coarb, the third of that name who held the office.

As he entered his office on the day of Amalgaidh's death, his appointment could not have been made by popular election, but on some other principle accepted and recognized by the clergy and people. His vacant lectorship was filled by the appointment of Ædh o Forreidh, who had been bishop of Armagh for seventeen years. Sir James Ware, who terms Dubhdalethe archbishop of Armagh, finds a difficulty in the fact of Forreidh having been also bishop during his time; however, the coarb of Armagh, or primate in modern language, was not necessarily a bishop, and in the case of Dubhdalethe there is even some doubt whether he was ordained at all. A bishop was a necessary officer in every ecclesiastical establishment, such as that at Armagh, but he was not the chief ecclesiastic.

In 1050, Dubhdalethe made a visitation of Cinel Eoghain, a territory comprising the county of Tyrone and part of County Donegal, and brought away a tribute of three hundred cows. In 1055, according to the Annals of Ulster, he made war on another ecclesiastic, the coarb of Finnian(the Abbot of Clonard), in the south-west of the county of Meath. The two fought, and many were killed. The quarrel probably related to some disputed property belonging to one or other of the abbeys concerned. This entry is omitted by the Annals of the Four Masters, deliberately so according to Thomas Olden in the DNB.

His death was recorded in 1064, and "Maelisa Máel Ísu mac Amalgada assumed the abbacy". Thus, the duration of Dubhdalethe's primacy was fifteen years. Ware, however, states that, according to the Psalter of Cashel, it was only twelve, "afford[ing] some room to suspect that Gilla Patrick MacDonald, who is expressly called archbishop of Armagh in the Annals of the Four Masters at 1052, ought to intervene between Amalgaidh and Dubhdalethe, which will pretty well square with the death of the latter in 1065 [1064]". However, Gilla Patrick is only termed prior by the Four Masters, and more exactly secnab or vice-abbot by the Annals of Ulster. St. Bernard of Clairvaux, in his Life of Maelmogue or Malachy, Primate of Armagh (1134–7), refers in severe terms to the usage "whereby the holy see [Armagh] came to be obtained by hereditary succession", and adds, "there had already been before the time of Celsus (died 1129) eight individuals who were married and without orders, yet men of education". One of these must have been Dubhdalethe, but St. Bernard was in error in viewing the influence of the hereditary principle at Armagh as unusual. The coarbs of St. Finnian, St. Columba, and other famous saints succeeded according to certain rules in which kinship to the founder played an important part. And thus it was that Dubhdalethe succeeded his predecessor on the day of his death, and that Maelisa, on the death of the former, "assumed" the abbacy.

Dubhdalethe was the author of Annals of Ireland, in which he makes use of Christian era timekeeping. This is one of the earliest instances in Ireland, if we accept Roderic O'Flaherty's opinion that it only came into use there about 1020. He considered him as contemporary with Mugron, Abbot of Iona (Hy) (died 980), and as he must therefore have been at least sixty-nine years old when he became primate, and may naturally be presumed to have compiled his Annals at an earlier period, he may have been actually the first to use it. His Annals are quoted in the Annals of Ulster (1021), page 926, and in the Four Masters, page 978. He is also reported to have been the author of a work on the archbishops of Armagh down to his own time.
