= Yaakov ben Yakar =

German rabbi (990–1064)

- יעקב בן יקר
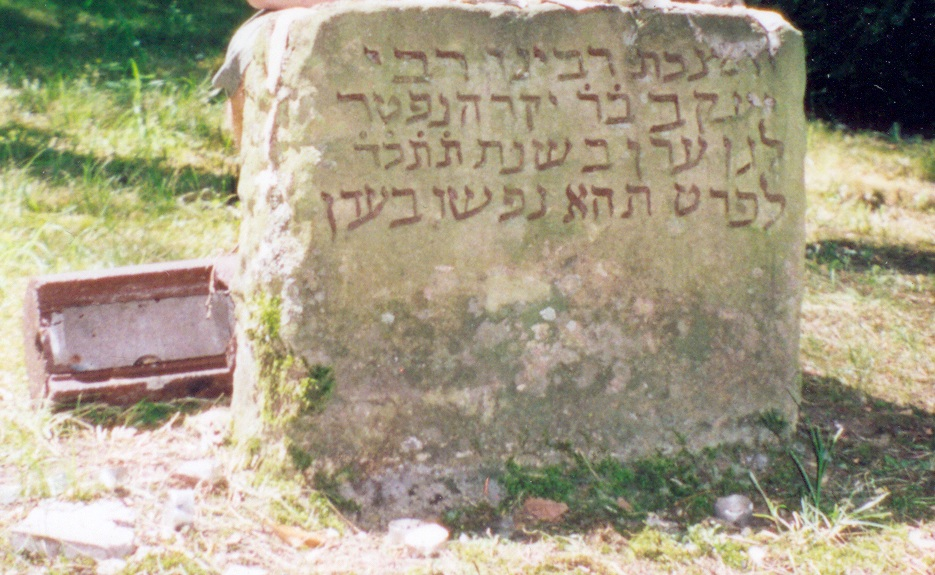
- Tombstone of Yaakov ben Yakar at the Mainzer Judensand
- Born: 990
- Died: 1064
- Parent: Rabbi Yakar

Yaakov ben Yakar (990 – 1064) was a German Talmudist. He flourished in the first half of the 11th century. He was a pupil of Gershom ben Judah in Mainz, and is especially known as the teacher of Rashi, who characterizes him as Mori HaZaken (my teacher the elder).

Yaakov was one of the leading Talmudic authorities of his time. In some cases Rashi disagrees with the opinions of his teacher Yaakov. It appears that Yaakov had already written commentaries on portions of the Talmud before Rashi. Much in Rashi's commentary on the Talmud is derived from oral communications of Yaakov. When Rashi says simply "my teacher" without naming any one he is always referring to his teacher Yaakov. It appears, based on a remark of Rashi, that Yaakov was engaged in interpreting the Tanakh and in the study of Hebrew. Besides Rashi, the German Talmudists Eliakim ben Meshullam HaLevi and Solomon ben Samson were pupils of Yaakov.

Prof. Avraham Grossman offered that Yaakov ben Yakar may be the author of the lost book Meat on Charcoals.

== References and further reading ==
- Henri Gross, Gallia Judaica, pp. 300, 506;
