= Sahl ben Matzliah =

Sahl ben Matzliah (Hebrew: סהל בן מצליח הכהן, Sahl Ben Matzliah HaCohen) (910–990), also known as Abu al-Sari, was a Karaite philosopher and writer.

Born in Jerusalem, he belonged to the Rechabites, and was one of the apostles of the Karaites who traveled extensively to win new adherents for Karaism and thereby strengthen the failing faith of their coreligionists. He was distinguished for his profound knowledge of Biblical and post-Biblical literature, and was a master of Arabic. Although he was one of Saadia Gaon's bitterest enemies, most of his attacks were directed against Samuel ben Jacob, a pupil of the gaon. The subject of his polemics, as with his predecessors, was the abolition of purification laws and of the lighting of lights and drawing of water on the Sabbath. He often reproaches the Rabbinites for preaching and teaching for the sake of gain, asserting that their aims are not as free from selfishness as those of the Karaites. Sahl's polemics throw much light upon the degree of laxness in religious ceremonial prevalent in his time. Thus he complains against the Rabbinites that in many matters they openly made common cause with non-Jews and were thereby led astray from the strict observance of the dietary laws.

Sahl was especially interested in calendric questions, and in one of his writings reviews the whole controversy between Rabbi Meïr of Jerusalem and Saadia in order to draw attention to the conciliatory disposition of the Palestinian Jews. He rendered valuable services to Karaism by establishing four fundamental exegetical principles. These four principles were:

1. the laying of special emphasis on the literal interpretation of the Scriptures
2. speculation
3. inference by analogy (hekkesh)
4. the agreement of the totality.

By these principles he made possible the acceptance by Karaism of many decisions not found in the Bible, and also brought about the introduction of many modifications in the ceremonial.

Sahl was the author of the following works:

- "Mishneh Torah," commentary on the Pentateuch (mentioned in "Orḥot Ẓaddiḳim," p. 24b; see Salomon Munk, "Notice sur Abul Walid Merwan ibn Djanah," iv. 6
- commentary on the books of Isaiah and Daniel (often mentioned in the "Ba'al ha-Mibḥar" of Aaron ben Joseph)
- "Sefer Dinim" (a copy of this work, possessed by Dr. Munk, is entitled "Sefer ha-Miẓwot" and is ascribed to Samuel Rofe)
- "Sefer ha-Miẓwot"
- a grammatical-lexical work entitled "Leshon Limmudin" (Fürst, "Gesch. des Kaiäert." ii.91)
- "Sefer Diḳduḳe," a Hebrew grammar
- a long letter against Jacob ben Samuel, protesting against public insult, and abuse (found by Elijah Yerushalmi in Jerusalem)
- ten unpublished responsa against Elijah Yerushalmi
- an anti-Rabbinite poem, his name being given in acrostic
- "Iggeret Toḥakat," or "Sefer Toḥakat."
