= Llywelyn Aurdorchog =

11th-century Welsh nobleman

Coat of arms of Llewelyn Aurdorchog as Lord of Yale

Llywelyn Aurdorchog (Welsh: "of the Golden Torc"; Latin: Torquatus; c. 1005 – c. 1065) was a Welsh noble who served as the penteulu ("War-chief") and Prime Minister of the King of Wales, Gruffydd ap Llywelyn.

He was rewarded with the Lordship of Ial (English: "Yale") and Ystrad Alud, two commotes in northeast Powys. His arms were azure, a lion rampant guardant or.

Llywelyn traced his ancestry to Sandde, a different son of Llywarch Hen from that claimed by the kings of Gwynedd and Deheubarth.

His eldest son Llywelyn Fychan inherited his domain around the year AD 1065. His other sons were Iorwerth, Idris, Dolfyn, and Ednywain. His daughter Agnes wed Uchdryd ap Edwin Tegeingl, who was lord of Cyfeiliog and Meirion.
