= Fujiwara no Nagaie =

Japanese nobleman and waka poet

Fujiwara no Nagaie (藤原 長家; 26 September 1005 – 19 December 1064) was a Japanese nobleman and waka poet of the Heian period.

== Life ==
Fujiwara no Nagaie was born on the 20th day of the eighth month of Kankō 2 (26 September 1005 in the Julian calendar), (Note: According to the Midō Kanpaku-ki.) to Fujiwara no Michinaga and Minamoto no Meishi His adoptive mother was Michinaga's principal wife (正室) Minamoto no Rinshi. He was the sixth and youngest of Michinaga's sons. He was fawned over by his father, adoptive mother, eldest sister Shōshi and eldest brother Yorimichi.

Nagaie lived for a long period in the Mikohidari manor on Sanjō Avenue, from which he acquired the nicknames Sanjō (三条) and Mikohidari (御子左).

At the height of his career, immediately before his death, he held the position of Provisional Senior Counselor and the Senior Second Rank. On the 25th day of the tenth month of Kōhei 7 (5 December 1064) he took the tonsure as a result of illness. He died shortly thereafter, on the ninth day of the eleventh month of Kōhei 7 (19 December 1064). (Note: According to the Kugyō Bunin.) He was sixty years old, by Japanese reckoning.

=== Descendants ===
Nagaie was the founder of the famous Mikohadari lineage of waka poets, which included his son Tadaie, grandson Toshitada, great-grandson Shunzei and great-great-grandson Fujiwara no Teika.

== Poetry ==
Nagaie was a patron of the poetic arts, which were seen as a key element in the education of the ruling class. He hosted poetic gatherings, including uta-awase contests and meetings for the composition of both waka and kanshi, at his residence. He participated in a number of uta-awase at the palace, notably acting as the poetic arbiter (歌撰者) of the right team (右方) at the Kōgōgū Shunjū Uta-awase (皇后宮春秋歌合) in Tengi 4 (1056).

43 (Note: The Nihon Jinmei Daijiten Plus entry on Nagaie gives a figure of 44.) of his waka were included in imperial anthologies from the Goshūi Wakashū on. He supposedly produced a kashū (personal collection), but this does not survive.
