= Ch'oe Ch'ung =

Korean philosopher (984–1068)

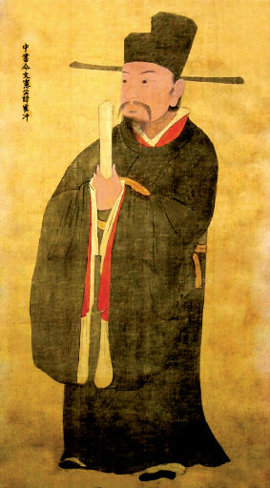
- Portrait of Ch'oe Ch'ung

Korean name
- Hangul: 최충
- Hanja: 崔沖
- RR: Choe Chung
- MR: Ch'oe Ch'ung

Art name
- Hangul: 성재, 월포, 방회재
- Hanja: 惺齋, 月圃, 放晦齋
- RR: Seongjae, Wolpo, Banghoejae
- MR: Sŏngjae, Wŏlp'o, Panghoejae

Courtesy name
- Hangul: 호연
- Hanja: 浩然
- RR: Hoyeon
- MR: Hoyŏn

Posthumous name
- Hangul: 문헌
- Hanja: 文憲
- RR: Munheon
- MR: Munhŏn

Ch'oe Ch'ung (Korean: 최충; Hanja: 崔沖; 984 – October 13, 1068 (Note: In the Korean calendar (lunisolar), he died on the 15th day of the 9th Lunar month.)) was a Korean Confucian scholar and poet of the Haeju Ch'oe clan during the Goryeo period. He has been called the grandfather of the Korean educational system.

== Biography ==
Ch'oe Ch'ung was born in 984, to the Haeju Ch'oe clan, which was of Silla aristocratic origins. In 1005, he took and passed the chinsa degree examination with the highest marks. In 1047, he was promoted to the position of chancellor (문하시중; 門下侍中).

Ch'oe founded the School of Nine Studies in the capital city of Kaegyong, a private school for the children of aristocratic families to prepare them for the civil service examinations. The academy taught pupils the Nine Confucian Classics (the I Ching, the Book of Documents, the Classic of Poetry, the Book of Etiquette and Ceremonial, the Rites of Zhou, the Book of Rites, the Zuo Zhuan, the Gongyang Zhuan, and the Guliang Zhuan) and the 3 histories (the Records of the Grand Historian, the Book of Han and the Book of the Later Han). The success of the school and its pupils led other leading Confucian scholars to establish similar own private educational institutions. Due to Ch'oe's efforts in popularizing the private school system, his contemporaries would nickname him the "Confucius of Korea".

On October 13, 1068, Ch'oe died. He was given the posthumous name of Munhŏn.

== Family ==
- Father: Ch'oe On (최온; 崔溫)
  - 1st son: Ch'oe Yusŏn (최유선; 崔惟善)
  - 2nd son: Ch'oe Yugil (최유길; 崔惟吉)
  - Daughter: Lady Ch'oe (부인 최씨; 夫人 崔氏)
    - Son-in-law: Kim Sŏngsu (김성수; 金成洙)
