= 1050s =

Decade

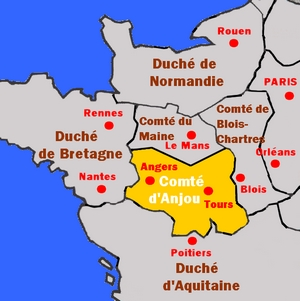
The principalities in the northwest of the Kingdom of France around the 1050s.

The 1050s was a decade of the Julian Calendar which began on January 1, 1050, and ended on December 31, 1059.

== Events ==
=== 1050 ===
==== By place ====
====== Europe ======
- Hedeby in Jutland is sacked by King Harald Hardrada of Norway, during the course of a conflict with Sweyn II of Denmark.
- King Anund Jacob dies after a 28-year reign. He is succeeded by his elder half-brother Emund the Old as king of Sweden.
- Macbeth, King of Scotland, makes a pilgrimage to Rome.

====== Africa ======
- Aoudaghost, an important Berber trading center and rival of Koumbi Saleh, is captured by the Ghana Empire.

==== By topic ====
====== Religion ======
- King Edward the Confessor unites the English dioceses of Devon and Cornwall. He moves the see from Crediton to Exeter and gives the order to build a cathedral. Leofric becomes the first bishop of Exeter.
- The brewery of Weltenburg Abbey (modern Germany) is first mentioned, thus making it one of the oldest still operating breweries in the world (approximate date).

=== 1051 ===
==== By place ====
====== Continental Europe ======
- Spring – William of Normandy consolidates his power in Normandy. He fights over the control of Maine (after the death of Count Hugh IV), and lays siege to the fortresses of Alençon and Domfront (Western France).
- May 19 – King Henry I of France marries Anne of Kiev at the cathedral of Reims. William of Normandy marries Matilda of Flanders, daughter of Count Baldwin V, which Henry sees as a threat to his throne.
- Summer – Drogo of Hauteville, count of Apulia and Calabria, meets Pope Leo IX in southern Italy – who has been sent by Emperor Henry III (the Black) to re-establish the "freedom of the Catholic Church". Drogo is forced to promise Pope Leo to stop the Normans from pillaging the Lombard countryside. On his way back (August 10), Drogo is assassinated near Bovino by a Byzantine conspiracy.
- Autumn – Battle of Vértes: Henry III, Holy Roman Emperor invades the Kingdom of Hungary, and is utterly defeated by Andrew I of Hungary.

====== England ======
- Eustace II, count of Boulogne, visits England and is received with honour at the court by King Edward the Confessor. In Dover a fight breaks out between the Norman visitors and the locals, resulting in the deaths of several people. Edward blames the people of Dover and orders Godwin, earl of Wessex, to deal with them. Godwin refuses to obey Edward's order, and in response Edward raises an army and forces the Godwin family into exile.
- Edward the Confessor invites William of Normandy to England. It is at this point that it is thought that Edward promises the English throne to William in the event of his death.
- Heregeld, commonly known as Danegeld, is abolished by Edward the Confessor. It has been collected for many years to provide funds for defending the country from Viking raiders.

==== By topic ====
====== Religion ======
- Hilarion of Kiev (or Ilarion) becomes the first non-Greek metropolitan bishop of the Eastern Orthodox Church, in Kiev.

=== 1052 ===
==== By place ====
====== England ======
- Summer – Godwin, Earl of Wessex, sails with a large fleet up the Thames to London, forcing King Edward the Confessor to reinstate him into his previous position of power.

====== Africa ======
- Battle of Haydaran: The Zirid dynasty is defeated by the invading Bedouin Arab tribes of the Banu Hilal.

==== By topic ====
====== Religion ======
- Byōdō-in, a Japanese Buddhist temple (located in the Kyoto Prefecture), changes its name by order of Fujiwara no Yorimichi.

=== 1053 ===
==== By place ====
====== Byzantine Empire ======
- End of the Pecheneg Revolt: Emperor Constantine IX Monomachos makes peace with the Pechenegs. However, Pecheneg raids do not cease; they not only damage the economy by plundering, but Constantine is also forced to buy protection or peace from them by gifts, land grants, privileges and titles.

====== Europe ======
- June 18 – Battle of Civitate: Norman horsemen (3,000 men), led by Humphrey of Hauteville, count of Apulia and Calabria, rout the combined forces under Pope Leo IX, in Southern Italy. The Normans destroy the allied Papal army and capture Leo, who is imprisoned (as a hostage for 8 months) in Benevento.
- December – Conrad I, duke of Bavaria, is summoned to a Christmas court at Merseburg, and deposed by Emperor Henry III. He flees to King Andrew I in Hungary, and joins a coalition with the rebellious Welf III, duke of Carinthia. Henry's 4-year-old son Henry becomes the new duke of Bavaria.

====== England ======
- April – Harold Godwinson succeeds his father Godwin as earl of Wessex. He invites the exiled Edward the Exile, son of Edmund II, to return in the hope that he can claim the English throne from King Edward the Confessor.

==== By topic ====
====== Religion ======
- Jōchō sculpts Amida Buddha for the Byōdō-in Temple in Japan during the Heian period (approximate date).

=== 1054 ===
==== By place ====
====== Byzantine Empire ======
- Sultan Tughril leads a large Seljuk army out of Azerbaijan into Armenia, possibly to consolidate his frontier, while providing an incentive to his Turkoman allies in the form of plunder. Tughril divides his army into four columns, ordering three to veer off to the north to raid into central and northern Armenia, while he takes the fourth column towards Lake Van. The Seljuk Turks capture and sack the fortress city of Artchesh, after an 8-day siege.

====== Europe ======
- Battle of Mortemer: The Normans, led by Duke William the Conqueror, defeat a French army (near Mortemer), as it is caught pillaging and plundering. King Henry I of France withdraws his main army from the Duchy of Normandy as a result. Guy I, Count of Ponthieu, is captured during the course of the battle.

====== Scotland ======
- July 27 – Siward, earl of Northumbria, invades Scotland, to support King Malcolm III against Macbeth, who has usurped the Scottish throne from Malcolm's father, Duncan I. Macbeth is defeated at Dunsinane.

====== Africa ======
- The Almoravids retake the trading center of Aoudaghost from the Ghana Empire. Repeated Almoravid incursions, aimed at seizing control of the trans-Saharan gold trade, disrupt Ghana's dominance of the trade routes.

====== Asia ======
- Lý Nhật Tôn, third king of the Lý Dynasty, begins to rule in Vietnam, and changes the country's official name to Đại Việt.

==== By topic ====
====== Astronomy ======
- July 4 (approx.) – SN 1054, a supernova, is first observed by the Chinese, Arabs and possibly Native Americans, near the star Zeta Tauri. For 23 days it remains bright enough to be seen in daylight. Its remnants form the Crab Nebula (NGC 1952).

====== Religion ======
- Spring – Pope Leo IX sends a legatine mission, under Cardinal Humbert of Silva Candida, to Constantinople, to negotiate with Patriarch Michael I Cerularius, in response to his actions concerning the church in Constantinople. Leo becomes the first pope directly to invoke the forged Donation of Constantine, citing a large portion in a letter to Michael, believing it genuine.
- July 16 – East-West Schism: Humbert of Silva Candida, representative of the newly deceased Leo IX, breaks the relations between Western and Eastern Churches, through the act of placing an invalidly-issued Papal Bull of excommunication during the celebration of the Divine Liturgy.

=== 1055 ===
==== By place ====
====== Byzantine Empire ======
- January 11 – Emperor Constantine IX Monomachos dies after a 12½-year reign at Constantinople. He is succeeded by Theodora (a sister of the former Empress Zoë), who is proclaimed by the imperial guard (with strong opposition from the council) as empress of the Byzantine Empire.

====== Europe ======
- King Ferdinand I of León ("the Great") begins his campaign against al-Andalus. He conquers Seia from the Christian allies of the Muslim taifas. In a drive to consolidate his southern border in Portugal he re-populates the city of Zamora with some of his Cantabrian (montañeses) subjects.

====== England ======
- October 24 – Ælfgar, Earl of Mercia, is outlawed by the witan ("meeting of wise men"). In revenge he builds a force and allies himself with the Welsh king Gruffydd ap Llywelyn. After defeating Ralph the Timid (a nephew of King Edward the Confessor), they attack Hereford and raid the church – taking everything of value, leaving the building on fire. The rebels also attack Leominster.
- Edward the Confessor gives Tostig Godwinson (upon the death of Earl Siward) the important position as earl of Northumbria and the difficult mission of bringing the northern state under control.

====== Arabian Empire ======
- Winter – The Seljuk Turks led by Sultan Tughril capture Baghdad and enter the city in a Roman-styled triumph. Al-Malik al-Rahim, the last Buyid emir in Iraq, is taken prisoner.

==== By topic ====
====== Architecture ======
- Construction on the Liaodi Pagoda in Hebei is completed (the tallest pagoda in Chinese history, standing at a height of 84 m (275 ft) tall).

====== Religion ======
- King Andrew I of Hungary ("the Catholic") establishes the Benedictine Tihany Abbey. Its foundation charter is the earliest written record extant in the Hungarian language.
- April 13 – Pope Victor II succeeds Leo IX as the 153rd pope of the Catholic Church in Rome (until 1057).

=== 1056 ===
==== By place ====
====== Byzantine Empire ======
- August 31 – Empress Theodora (a sister of the former Empress Zoë) dies after a 18-month reign, by a sudden illness at Constantinople. She is succeeded by Michael VI Bringas ("the Old"), who had served as military finance minister under the former Emperor Romanos III. Michael is appointed through the influence of Leo Paraspondylos, Theodora's most trusted adviser. This ends the Macedonian dynasty.
- Theodosius, a nephew of the former Emperor Constantine IX, tries to usurp the Byzantine throne, and liberates all the prisoners who flock to his banner. With their support, he marches through the streets of Constantinople to the Palace. There, the Varangian Guard forms outside to stop him. Theodosius loses heart and heads for Hagia Sophia. Later he is captured, and exiled to Pergamon.

====== Europe ======
- October 5 – Henry III, Holy Roman Emperor ("the Black") dies after a 10-year reign at Bodfeld, an imperial hunting lodge (Königspfalz) in the Harz Mountains. He is succeeded by his 5-year-old only son Henry IV as "king of the Germans" and enthroned by Pope Victor II (also a German) at Aachen – while his mother, Empress Agnes of Poitou, becomes co-regent.
- Ottokar I, count of Steyr, becomes margrave of the Karantanian March (later known as Styria).

====== Britain ======
- June 16 – In response to the attack on Hereford Cathedral in 1055, Leofgar the bishop of Hereford takes an army into Wales to deal with the Welsh prince Gruffydd ap Llywelyn. He along with a large number of English troops is killed in battle at Glasbury-on-Wye by the Welsh. Earl Harold Godwinson raises an army to take revenge, but comes to peaceful terms with Gruffydd.

====== Northern Africa ======
- Battle of Tabfarilla in modern day Mauritania: The Almoravids are crushed by the Godala and their Emir.
- Yahya ibn Umar al-Lamtuni falls.

==== By topic ====
====== Religion ======
- The Pagoda of Fogong Temple at Shanxi in northern China is built during the Liao dynasty. Work begins on the Pizhi Pagoda of Lingyan Temple at Shandong under the opposing Song dynasty.
- Dromtön, an Atiśa chief disciple, founds Reting Monastery in the Reting Tsangpo Valley (north of Lhasa) as the seat of Kadam lineage of Tibetan Buddhism.
- The Muslims expel 300 Christians from Jerusalem, and European Christians are forbidden to enter the Church of the Holy Sepulcher.

=== 1057 ===
==== By place ====
====== Byzantine Empire ======
- June 8 – General Isaac Komnenos proclaims himself emperor in Paphlagonia (modern Turkey), and starts a civil war against Emperor Michael VI. He advances with a Byzantine expeditionary force towards Constantinople. At the same time, Michael sends an army against the rebels – western regiments and eastern ones (those from the Anatolic Theme and Charsianon) – to stop him.
- August 20 – Battle of Hades: Rebel forces under Isaac Komnenos defeat the Byzantines on the plains of Hades (near Nicaea). General Katakalon Kekaumenos routs the imperial right flank, and reaches the enemy's camp. He destroys the tents and supplies, which leaves the way open to Constantinople.
- September 1 – A riot in favor of Isaac Komnenos breaks out in Constantinople. Patriarch Michael I convinces Michael VI to abdicate the throne, and Isaac is crowned as emperor of the Byzantine Empire.

====== Europe ======
- August 15 – Battle of Lumphanan: Macbeth, King of Scotland ("the Red King") is killed by Malcolm ("Canmore"). Macbeth is succeeded by his stepson Lulach, who is crowned (probably on September 8) as king of Scotland at Scone.
- August – Battle of Varaville: Norman forces under William the Conqueror defeat a Franco-Angevin army at the mouth of the Dives. King Henry I of France on campaign in Normandy is forced to retreat his army.
- King Ferdinand I of León ("the Great") takes the cities of Lamego and Viseu (modern Portugal) from Christian lords allied to the Muslim Taifa of Silves.

====== Africa ======
- The Banu Hilal razes Kairouan (in modern Tunisia). The Zirid dynasty has to re-settle to Mahdia (approximate date).

====== Asia ======
- King Anawrahta captures Thaton, the capital of the Thaton Kingdom, strengthening Theravada Buddhism in Burma.

==== By topic ====
====== Religion ======
- July 28 – Pope Victor II dies after a 15-month pontificate at Arezzo. He is succeeded by Stephen IX as the 154th pope of the Catholic Church.

=== 1058 ===
==== By place ====
====== Europe ======
- March 17 – King Lulach ("the Unfortunate") of Scotland is killed in battle against his cousin and rival Malcolm III ("Canmore") who becomes king of the Scots.
- September 20 – Empress Agnes de Poitou and King Andrew I ("the White") of Hungary meet to negotiate about the border zone in Burgenland (modern Austria).
- 4-year-old Judith of Swabia, youngest daughter of the late Henry III, Holy Roman Emperor, is engaged to Prince Solomon of Hungary at Regensburg.
- Norman conquest of southern Italy: Norman forces under Richard Drengot besiege and capture Capua. He takes the princely title from Prince Landulf VIII.
- Bolesław II the Generous, eldest son of Casimir I the Restorer, succeeds his father after his death in Poznań and becomes duke of Poland.

====== Africa ======
- The Almoravids conquer the Barghawata, a group of Berber tribes, who have established an independent state in modern-day Morocco.

==== By topic ====
====== Religion ======
- Spring – Pope Stephen IX pronounces on the authenticity of the relics of Mary Magdalene at Vézelay Abbey in Burgundy, making it a major centre of pilgrimage.
- March 29 – Stephen IX dies of a severe illness after a pontificate of 7 months at Florence. He is succeeded by Nicholas II who will be installed the following year.
- November 6 – Byzantine Emperor Isaac I Komnenos deposes Michael I Cerularius, patriarch of Constantinople, and has him exiled to Prokonnessos (until 1059).
- Ealdred, archbishop of York, becomes the first English bishop to make a pilgrimage to Jerusalem.

=== 1059 ===
==== By place ====
====== Byzantine Empire ======
- November 22 – Emperor Isaac I Komnenos falls ill on a hunt and retires to a monastery after a 2-year reign. He abdicates the Byzantine throne and appoints Constantine X, a Paphlagonian nobleman, as his successor.
- Fall – The Magyars cross the Danube River, together with several Pecheneg tribes, but are halted by Byzantine forces (approximate date).

====== Europe ======
- Peter Krešimir IV is crowned king of Croatia and Dalmatia. His coronation is recognised by the Byzantine Empire who confirm him as the supreme ruler of the Dalmatian cities, i.e. over the Theme of Dalmatia – excluding the theme of Ragusa and the Duchy of Durazzo.
- August 23 – Robert Guiscard, count of Apulia and Calabria, signs the Treaty of Melfi with Pope Nicholas II. Nicholas recognises the Norman conquest of southern Italy, and accepts the titles of Guiscard as duke of Sicily.

====== Seljuk Empire ======
- Alp Arslan succeeds his father Chaghri Beg as governor of Khorasan. He crosses with a Seljuk expeditionary force the upper Halys River and plunders the Theme of Sebasteia (modern Turkey).

==== By topic ====
====== Religion ======
- January 24 – Pope Nicholas II succeeds Stephen IX as the 155th pope of the Catholic Church. He is installed in Rome in opposition to Antipope Benedict X – the brother of the late Pope Benedict IX (deposed in 1048).
- April 13 – Nicholas II, with the agreement of the Lateran Council, issues the papal bull In nomine Domini, making the College of Cardinals the sole voters in the papal conclave for the election of popes.

== Significant people ==
- Godwin, Earl of Wessex
- Al-Qa'im
- Tughril

== Births ==
1050

- November 11 – Henry IV, Holy Roman Emperor (d. 1106)
- Amadeus II, count of Savoy (approximate date)
- Berthold II, duke of Swabia (approximate date)
- Bertrand of Comminges, French bishop (d. 1126)
- Frederick I, duke of Swabia (approximate date)
- Leopold II ("the Fair"), margrave of Austria (d. 1095)
- Lhachen Gyalpo, king of Ladakh (approximate date)
- Liutold of Eppenstein, German nobleman (approximate date)
- Li Tang, Chinese landscape painter (approximate date)
- Lope Íñiguez, lord of Biscay (approximate date)
- Michael VII Doukas, Byzantine emperor (approximate date)
- Muhammad al-Baghdadi, Arab mathematician (d. 1141)
- Muirchertach Ua Briain, king of Munster (approximate date)
- Olaf I ("Hunger"), king of Denmark (approximate date)
- Olaf III ("the Peaceful"), king of Norway (approximate date)
- Osbern of Canterbury, English hagiographer (d. 1090)
- Peter the Hermit, French priest (approximate date)
- Sophia of Hungary, duchess of Saxony (approximate date)
- Sviatopolk II, Grand Prince of Kiev (d. 1113)
- Vidyakara, Indian Buddhist scholar (d. 1130)

1051

- September 21 – Bertha of Savoy, Holy Roman Empress consort (d. 1087)
- Cadwgan ap Bleddyn, Welsh prince of Powys (d. 1111)
- Mi Fu, Chinese painter, poet and calligrapher (d. 1107)
- Approximate date – Robert Curthose, duke of Normandy (d. 1134)

1052

- May 23 – Philip I ("the Amorous"), king of France (d. 1108)
- September/October – Conrad II ("the Child"), duke of Bavaria (d. 1055)
- Agnes of Aquitaine, countess of Savoy (approximate date)
- Dirk V, count of Friesland (west of the Vlie) (d. 1091)
- Edgar Ætheling, uncrowned king of England (d. c. 1126) (approximate date)
- Gleb Svyatoslavich, Kievan prince (approximate date)
- Jón Ögmundsson, Icelandic bishop and saint (d. 1121)
- Robert of Bellême, 3rd Earl of Shrewsbury, Norman nobleman (approximate date)
- Roman Svyatoslavich, Kievan prince (approximate date)

1053

- May 26 – Vladimir II, Grand Prince of Kiev (d. 1125)
- July 7 – Shirakawa, emperor of Japan (d. 1129)
- Berenguer Ramon II, count of Barcelona (approximate date)
- Guibert of Nogent, French historian and theologian (d. 1124) (approximate date)
- Hugh of Châteauneuf, bishop of Grenoble (d. 1132)
- Iorwerth ap Bleddyn, Welsh prince of Powys (d. 1111)
- Maria of Alania, Byzantine empress consort (d. 1118)
- Ramon Berenguer II, count of Barcelona (or 1054)
- Solomon (or Salomon), king of Hungary (d. 1087)
- Toba Sōjō, Japanese artist-monk (d. 1140)

1054

- September 2 – Sukjong, ruler of Goryeo (d. 1105)
- Al-Hariri of Basra, Abbasid poet and scholar (d. 1122)
- Bohemond I of Antioch, Italo-Norman nobleman (approximate date)
- George II (Giorgi), king of Georgia (approximate date)
- Judith of Lens, niece of William the Conqueror (or 1055)
- Judith of Swabia, queen consort of Hungary (d. 1105)
- Langri Tangpa, Tibetan Buddhist master (d. 1123)
- Ramon Berenguer II, Count of Barcelona (or 1053)
- Tong Guan, Chinese general and adviser (d. 1126)

1055

- August 16 – Malik-Shah I, sultan of the Seljuk Empire (d. 1092)
- September 28 – Uicheon, Korean Buddhist monk (d. 1101)
- Adelaide of Weimar-Orlamünde, German noblewoman (d. 1100)
- Alger of Liège, French clergyman and priest (d. 1131)
- Bertha of Holland, French queen consort (d. 1094)
- Fujiwara no Akisue, Japanese nobleman (d. 1123)
- Gilbert Crispin, Norman abbot and theologian (d. 1117)
- Gruffudd ap Cynan, king of Gwynedd (approximate date)
- Hildebert, French hagiographer and theologian (d. 1133)
- Ida of Austria, German duchess and crusader (d. 1101)
- Judith of Lens, niece of William the Conqueror (or 1054)
- Machig Labdrön, Tibetan Buddhist teacher (d. 1149)
- Minamoto no Shunrai, Japanese poet (d. 1129)
- Terken Khatun, Seljuk empress (approximate date)
- Vigrahapala III, ruler of the Pala Empire (d. 1070)

1056

- July 24 – Al-Muqtadi, caliph of the Abbasid Caliphate (d. 1094)
- Abdallah ibn Buluggin ("the Conqueror"), emir of Granada
- Baldwin II of Mons, count of Hainaut (approximate date)
- Ermengol IV, Count of Urgell (or Armengol), Spanish nobleman (d. 1092)
- Fujiwara no Kiyohira, Japanese nobleman and samurai (d. 1128)
- Hildegarde of Burgundy, French noblewoman (approximate date)
- Nestor the Chronicler, Russian monk and historian (d. 1114) (approximate date)
- Sæmundr fróði (Sæmundur Sigfússon), Icelandic priest and scholar (d. 1133)
- Zhou Bangyan, Chinese bureaucrat and ci poet (d. 1121)

1057

- Fujiwara no Kenshi, Japanese empress (d. 1084)
- Fujiwara no Nakazane, Japanese nobleman (d. 1118)
- Hugh, Count of Vermandois ("the Great"), French nobleman (d. 1101)
- Hugh I, Duke of Burgundy, French nobleman (House of Burgundy) (d. 1093)
- Ibn Tahir of Caesarea, Arab scholar and historian (d. 1113) (approximate date)
- Rhygyfarch, Welsh bishop of St. David's (d. 1099)
- William II (William Rufus), king of England (d. 1100) (approximate date)

1058

- Al-Ghazali, Persian theologian and jurist (approximate date)
- Ibn Bassam, Andalusian poet and historian (d. 1147)
- Synadene, queen consort of Hungary (approximate date)
- Theodora Anna Doukaina Selvo, Venetian dogaressa (d. 1083)
- Wynebald de Ballon, Norman nobleman (approximate date)

1059

- At-Turtushi, Andalusian political philosopher (d. 1126)
- Fujiwara no Akinaka, Japanese nobleman (d. 1129)
- Fulcher of Chartres, French priest and chronicler (approximate date)
- Henry I, count of Limburg and Arlon (approximate date)
- Ngok Loden Sherab, Tibetan Buddhist monk (d. 1109)
- Raynald I, French nobleman and abbot (d. 1090)
- Robert of Burgundy, bishop of Langres (d. 1111)

== Deaths ==
1050

- February 10 – Anna, Grand Princess of Kiev (b. 1001)
- October 29 – Eadsige, archbishop of Canterbury
- Alferius (or Alferio), Italian abbot and saint (b. 930)
- Anund Jacob (or James), king of Sweden (b. 1008)
- Casilda of Toledo, Spanish saint (approximate date)
- Constantine Arianites, Byzantine general
- Einar Thambarskelfir, Norwegian nobleman
- Herleva, Norman noblewoman (approximate date)
- Hugh of Langres, French bishop and theologian
- Humphrey de Vieilles, Norman nobleman
- Michael Dokeianos, Byzantine general
- Suryavarman I, king of the Khmer Empire
- Wifred II, count of Cerdanya and Berga
- Zoë, empress of the Byzantine Empire

1051

- January 22 – Ælfric Puttoc, archbishop of York
- February 28 – Humfrid, archbishop of Magdeburg
- March 14 – Gerard I, bishop of Cambrai
- March 25 – Hugh IV, count of Maine
- April 27 – Fulk Bertrand I, count of Provence
- June 10/11 – Bardo, German abbot and archbishop
- August 10 – Drogo of Hauteville, Norman nobleman, assassinated
- November 7 – Rotho, bishop of Paderborn
- Bernard, margrave of the Nordmark
- Bi Sheng, Chinese artisan and inventor (b. 990)
- Jordan of Laron, bishop of Limoges
- Kálfr Árnason, Norwegian chieftain
- Ralph de Gacé, Norman nobleman

1052

- March 6 – Emma of Normandy, queen consort of England (twice), Denmark and Norway (b. 984)
- May 6 – Boniface III, Italian prince and margrave (assassinated)
- June 2/4 – assassinations
  - Guaimar IV of Salerno, Italian nobleman
  - Pandulf III of Salerno, Lombard prince
  - Pandulf of Capaccio, Lombard nobleman
- June 19 – Fan Zhongyan, chancellor of the Song dynasty (b. 989)
- October 4 – Vladimir Yaroslavich, Grand Prince of Kiev (b. 1020)
- October 27 – Qirwash ibn al-Muqallad, Uqaylid emir
- December 14 – Aaron Scotus, Irish abbot and musician
- Amadeus I, count of Savoy (approximate date)
- Halinard, French archbishop (approximate date)
- Hugh II, count of Ponthieu (also lord of Abbeville)
- Rodulf, Norman missionary bishop and abbot
- Sweyn Godwinson (or Swein), English nobleman
- Xu Daoning, Chinese painter (approximate date)
- Xuedou Chongxian, Chinese Buddhist monk

1053

- by January 5 – Rhys ap Rhydderch, Welsh co-ruler of Morgannwg, killed
- March 25 – Procopius of Sázava, Czech hermit
- April 15 – Godwin of Wessex, English nobleman
- October 25 – Enguerrand II, count of Ponthieu
- November 7 – Lazaros, Byzantine monk and stylite
- Abu'l-Fath an-Nasir ad-Dailami, imam of Yemen, killed
- Chananel ben Chushiel, Tunisian Jewish rabbi (b. 990)
- Cormac O'Ruadrach, Irish priest and archdeacon
- Liu Yong, Chinese poet of the Song dynasty (b. 987)
- Murchadh Ua Beolláin, Irish priest and archdeacon
- Wulfsige (or Wulsy), English bishop of Lichfield

1054

- February 20 – Yaroslav the Wise, Kievan Rus' grand prince (b. c.978)
- March 8 – Azelin (Azellinus), bishop of Hildesheim
- April 19 – Pope Leo IX, German pontiff of the Catholic Church (b. 1002)
- July 19 – Bernold (Bernulf), bishop of Utrecht
- August 25 – Fujiwara no Michimasa, Japanese nobleman (b. 992)
- August 31 – Kunigunde of Altdorf, German noblewoman (b. c.1020)
- September 1 – Fortún Sánchez, Navarrese nobleman (b. c.992)
- September 15 – García Sánchez III, king of Pamplona (b. c.1012)
- September 24 – Hermann of Reichenau, German music theorist (b. 1013)
- Abu Sahl Zawzani, Persian statesman and chief secretary
- Atiśa, Tibetan Buddhist leader and master (b. c.980)
- Cacht ingen Ragnaill, queen consort of Munster
- Nuño Álvarez de Carazo, Castilian nobleman
- Osbern Pentecost, Norman knight and nobleman
- Osgod Clapa (Osgot), Anglo-Saxon nobleman

1055

- January 10 – Bretislav I, duke of Bohemia
- January 11 – Constantine IX, Byzantine emperor
- April 10 – Conrad II, duke of Bavaria (b. 1052)
- May 26 – Adalbert, margrave of Austria
- August 28 – Xing Zong, Chinese emperor (b. 1016)
- November 13 – Welf III, duke of Carinthia
- December 5 – Conrad I, duke of Bavaria
- A Nong, Chinese shamaness, matriarch and warrior
- Benedict I, Hungarian politician and archbishop
- Boniface IV Frederick, margrave of Tuscany
- Gruffydd ap Rhydderch, king of Deheubarth
- Mauger (or Malger), archbishop of Rouen
- Nong Zhigao, Vietnamese chieftain of Nong
- Rinchen Zangpo, Tibetan Buddhist monk (b. 958)
- Siward (or Sigurd), earl of Northumbria
- Theodore Aaronios, Byzantine governor
- Yan Shu, Chinese statesman and poet (b. 991)

1056

- February 10 – Æthelstan, English bishop of Hereford
- February 11 – Herman II (or Heriman), archbishop of Cologne
- June 16 – Leofgar (or Leovegard), English bishop of Hereford, killed in battle
- August 31
  - Odda of Deerhurst, English nobleman
  - Theodora, empress regnant of the Byzantine Empire
- September 10 – William, margrave of the Nordmark
- October 5 – Henry III ("the Black"), Holy Roman Emperor (b. 1017)
- November 25 – Flann Mainistreach, Irish poet and historian
- Áed Ua Forréid, bishop of Armagh (Church of Ireland)
- Anselm of Liège, French chronicler (approximate date)
- Benedict IX, pope of the Catholic Church (approximate date)
- Ekkehard IV, Swiss monk and chronicler (approximate date)
- Hilal al-Sabi', Buyid historian, bureaucrat and writer
- Leo of Ohrid, Byzantine archbishop and theologian
- Yahya ibn Umar al-Lamtuni, Almoravid chieftain

1057

- April 19 – Edward the Exile, son of Edmund II (Ironside)
- June 1 – Íñigo of Oña, Spanish Benedictine abbot
- June 26 – Otto, margrave of the Nordmark
- July 28 – Victor II, pope of the Catholic Church
- August 15 – Macbeth, king of Scotland (b. before 1040)
- August 28 – Abe no Yoritoki, Japanese samurai
- August 31 – Michael VI, Byzantine emperor
- September 28 – Otto III, duke of Swabia
- November 7 – Lothair Udo I, German nobleman (b. 994)
- Abul 'Ala Al-Ma'arri, Arabian philosopher (b. 973)
- Ala al-Din Abu'l-Ghana'im Sa'd, Buyid vizier
- Bruno II, margrave of Friesland (b. 1024)
- Di Qing, Chinese general (b. 1008)
- Heca (or Hecca), bishop of Selsey
- Humphrey of Hauteville, Norman nobleman
- Jōchō Busshi, Japanese sculptor
- Leofric, English earl and peerage
- Ostromir, Russian statesman (approximate date)
- Otto I (or Odon), Italian nobleman (approximate date)
- Pandulf VI (or Pandulf V), Italian nobleman
- Ralph the Timid, Norman nobleman
- Reginald I, French nobleman (b. 986)
- William fitz Giroie, Norman nobleman

1058

- March 1 – Ermesinde, countess and regent of Barcelona
- March 17 – Lulach ("the Unfortunate"), king of Scotland
- March 29 – Stephen IX, pope of the Catholic Church
- August 2 – Judith of Schweinfurt, duchess of Bohemia
- November 28 – Casimir I the Restorer, duke of Poland (b. 1016)
- Abdollah ibn Bukhtishu, Syrian physician (b. 980)
- Abu Muhammad al-Yazuri, vizier of the Fatimid Caliphate
- Ælfwold II, bishop of Sherborne (approximate date)
- Al-Mawardi, Abbasid jurist and diplomat (b. 972)
- Boite mac Cináeda (or Bodhe), Scottish prince
- Centule IV Gaston ("the Old"), viscount of Béarn
- Egbert of Fulda, German Benedictine abbot
- Fakhruddin As'ad Gurgani, Persian poet and writer
- Flaithem Mac Mael Gaimrid, Irish poet and Chief Ollam
- Grigor Magistros, Armenian prince and governor
- Ilduara Mendes, countess and regent of Portugal
- Theophanu, abbess of Essen and Gerresheim
- William VII ("the Bold"), duke of Aquitaine (b. 1023)

1059

- January 21 – Michael I Cerularius, Byzantine patriarch
- April 4 – Farrukh-Zad, Ghaznavid sultan (b. 1025)
- June 29 – Bernard II, German nobleman
- July 7 – Abdallah ibn Yasin, Almoravid ruler
- August 14 – Giselbert, count of Luxembourg
- Cathal mac Tigernán, Irish king of Iar Connacht
- Eilika of Schweinfurt, German noblewoman (after December 10)
- Michael VI Bringas, Byzantine emperor
- Peter Orseolo ("the Venetian"), king of Hungary (possible date)
- Vyacheslav Yaroslavich, prince of Smolensk
