= 1055 =

1055 in various calendars
- Gregorian calendar: 1055; MLV
- Ab urbe condita: 1808
- Armenian calendar: 504; ԹՎ ՇԴ
- Assyrian calendar: 5805
- Balinese saka calendar: 976–977
- Bengali calendar: 461–462
- Berber calendar: 2005
- English Regnal year: N/A
- Buddhist calendar: 1599
- Burmese calendar: 417
- Byzantine calendar: 6563–6564
- Chinese calendar: 甲午年 (Wood Horse); 3752 or 3545 — to — 乙未年 (Wood Goat); 3753 or 3546
- Coptic calendar: 771–772
- Discordian calendar: 2221
- Ethiopian calendar: 1047–1048
- Hebrew calendar: 4815–4816
- Hindu calendars
- Vikram Samvat: 1111–1112
- Shaka Samvat: 976–977
- Kali Yuga: 4155–4156
- Holocene calendar: 11055
- Igbo calendar: 55–56
- Iranian calendar: 433–434
- Islamic calendar: 446–447
- Japanese calendar: Tengi 3 (天喜３年)
- Javanese calendar: 958–959
- Julian calendar: 1055; MLV
- Korean calendar: 3388
- Minguo calendar: 857 before ROC 民前857年
- Nanakshahi calendar: −413
- Seleucid era: 1366/1367 AG
- Thai solar calendar: 1597–1598
- Tibetan calendar: ཤིང་ཕོ་རྟ་ལོ་ (male Wood-Horse); 1181 or 800 or 28 — to — ཤིང་མོ་ལུག་ལོ་ (female Wood-Sheep); 1182 or 801 or 29

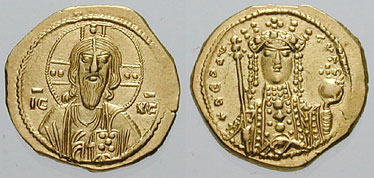
Coin of Empress Theodora (980–1056)

1055 (MLV) was a common year starting on Sunday of the Julian calendar.

== Events ==
=== By place ===
==== Byzantine Empire ====
- January 11 – Emperor Constantine IX Monomachos dies after a 12½-year reign at Constantinople. He is succeeded by Theodora (a sister of the former Empress Zoë), who is proclaimed by the imperial guard (with strong opposition from the council) as empress of the Byzantine Empire.

==== Europe ====
- King Ferdinand I of León ("the Great") begins his campaign against al-Andalus. He conquers Seia from the Christian allies of the Muslim taifas. In a drive to consolidate his southern border in Portugal he re-populates the city of Zamora with some of his Cantabrian (montañeses) subjects.

==== England ====
- October 24 – Ælfgar, Earl of Mercia, is outlawed by the witan ("meeting of wise men"). In revenge he builds a force and allies himself with the Welsh king Gruffydd ap Llywelyn. After defeating Ralph the Timid (a nephew of King Edward the Confessor), they attack Hereford and raid the church – taking everything of value, leaving the building on fire. The rebels also attack Leominster.
- Edward the Confessor gives Tostig Godwinson (upon the death of Earl Siward) the important position as earl of Northumbria and the difficult mission of bringing the northern state under control.

==== Arabian Empire ====
- Winter – The Seljuk Turks led by Sultan Tughril capture Baghdad and enter the city in a Roman-styled triumph. Al-Malik al-Rahim, the last Buyid emir in Iraq, is taken prisoner.

=== By topic ===
==== Architecture ====
- Construction on the Liaodi Pagoda in Hebei is completed (the tallest pagoda in Chinese history, standing at a height of 84 m (275 ft) tall).

==== Religion ====
- King Andrew I of Hungary ("the Catholic") establishes the Benedictine Tihany Abbey. Its foundation charter is the earliest written record extant in the Hungarian language.
- April 13 – Pope Victor II succeeds Leo IX as the 153rd pope of the Catholic Church in Rome (until 1057).

== Births ==
- August 16 – Malik-Shah I, sultan of the Seljuk Empire (d. 1092)
- September 28 – Uicheon, Korean Buddhist monk (d. 1101)
- Adelaide of Weimar-Orlamünde, German noblewoman (d. 1100)
- Alger of Liège, French clergyman and priest (d. 1131)
- Bertha of Holland, French queen consort (d. 1094)
- Fujiwara no Akisue, Japanese nobleman (d. 1123)
- Gilbert Crispin, Norman abbot and theologian (d. 1117)
- Gruffudd ap Cynan, king of Gwynedd (approximate date)
- Hildebert, French hagiographer and theologian (d. 1133)
- Ida of Austria, German duchess and crusader (d. 1101)
- Judith of Lens, niece of William the Conqueror (or 1054)
- Machig Labdrön, Tibetan Buddhist teacher (d. 1149)
- Minamoto no Shunrai, Japanese poet (d. 1129)
- Terken Khatun, Seljuk empress (approximate date)
- Vigrahapala III, ruler of the Pala Empire (d. 1070)

== Deaths ==
- January 10 – Bretislav I, duke of Bohemia
- January 11 – Constantine IX, Byzantine emperor
- April 10 – Conrad II, duke of Bavaria (b. 1052)
- May 26 – Adalbert, margrave of Austria
- August 28 – Xing Zong, Chinese emperor (b. 1016)
- November 13 – Welf III, duke of Carinthia
- December 5 – Conrad I, duke of Bavaria
- A Nong, Chinese shamaness, matriarch and warrior
- Benedict I, Hungarian politician and archbishop
- Boniface IV Frederick, margrave of Tuscany
- Gruffydd ap Rhydderch, king of Deheubarth
- Mauger (or Malger), archbishop of Rouen
- Nong Zhigao, Vietnamese chieftain of Nong
- Rinchen Zangpo, Tibetan Buddhist monk (b. 958)
- Siward (or Sigurd), earl of Northumbria
- Theodore Aaronios, Byzantine governor
- Yan Shu, Chinese statesman and poet (b. 991)
