= 1052 =

1052 in various calendars
- Gregorian calendar: 1052; MLII
- Ab urbe condita: 1805
- Armenian calendar: 501; ԹՎ ՇԱ
- Assyrian calendar: 5802
- Balinese saka calendar: 973–974
- Bengali calendar: 458–459
- Berber calendar: 2002
- English Regnal year: N/A
- Buddhist calendar: 1596
- Burmese calendar: 414
- Byzantine calendar: 6560–6561
- Chinese calendar: 辛卯年 (Metal Rabbit); 3749 or 3542 — to — 壬辰年 (Water Dragon); 3750 or 3543
- Coptic calendar: 768–769
- Discordian calendar: 2218
- Ethiopian calendar: 1044–1045
- Hebrew calendar: 4812–4813
- Hindu calendars
- Vikram Samvat: 1108–1109
- Shaka Samvat: 973–974
- Kali Yuga: 4152–4153
- Holocene calendar: 11052
- Igbo calendar: 52–53
- Iranian calendar: 430–431
- Islamic calendar: 443–444
- Japanese calendar: Eishō 7 (永承７年)
- Javanese calendar: 955–956
- Julian calendar: 1052; MLII
- Korean calendar: 3385
- Minguo calendar: 860 before ROC 民前860年
- Nanakshahi calendar: −416
- Seleucid era: 1363/1364 AG
- Thai solar calendar: 1594–1595
- Tibetan calendar: ལྕགས་མོ་ཡོས་ལོ་ (female Iron-Hare); 1178 or 797 or 25 — to — ཆུ་ཕོ་འབྲུག་ལོ་ (male Water-Dragon); 1179 or 798 or 26

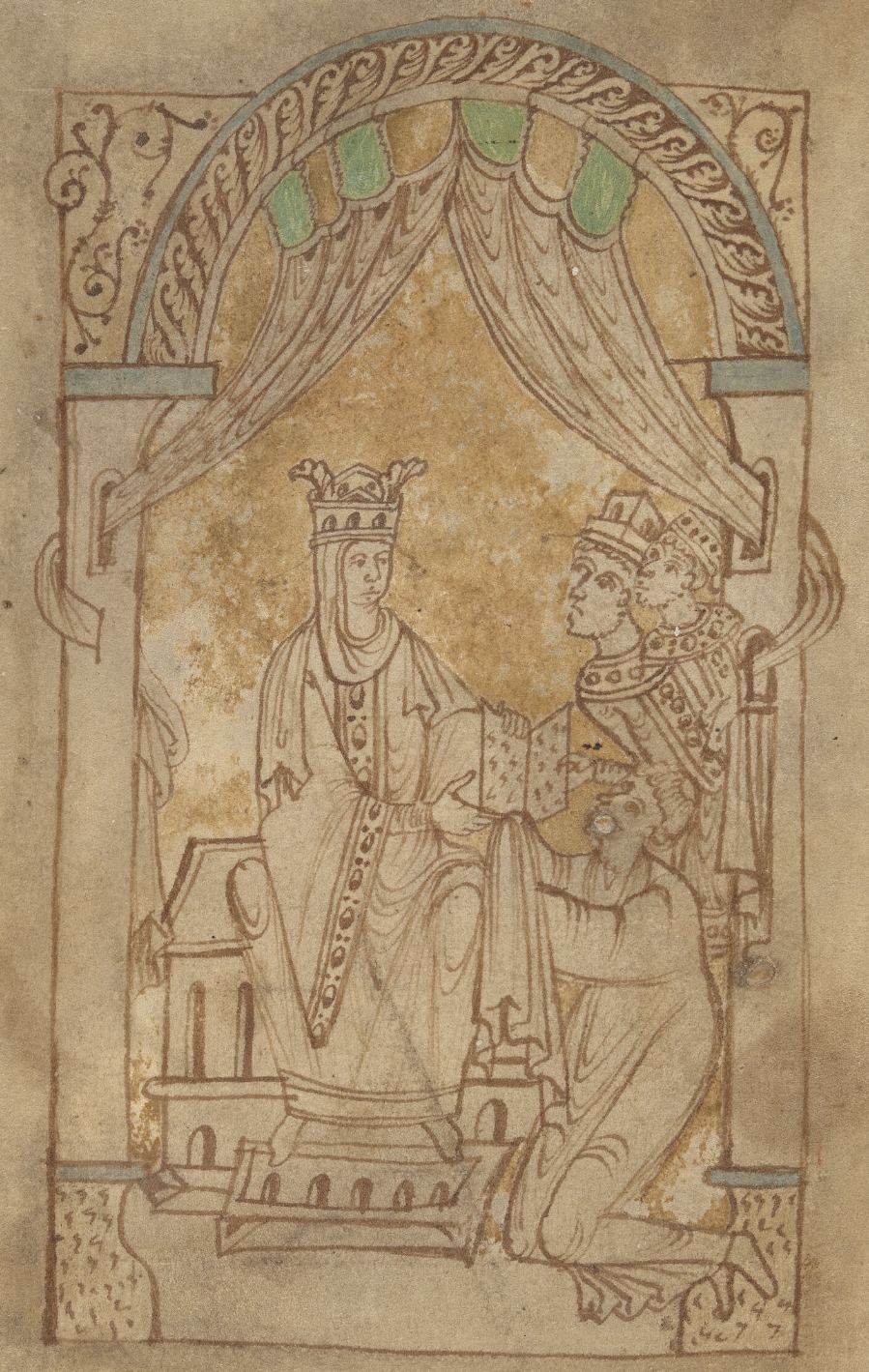
Emma of Normandy, queen consort of England (left), receives her Encomium (British Library).

Year 1052 (MLII) was a leap year starting on Wednesday of the Julian calendar.

== Events ==
=== By place ===
==== England ====
- Summer – Godwin, Earl of Wessex, sails with a large fleet up the Thames to London, forcing King Edward the Confessor to reinstate him into his previous position of power.

==== Africa ====
- Battle of Haydaran: The Zirid dynasty is defeated by the invading Bedouin Arab tribes of the Banu Hilal.

=== By topic ===
==== Religion ====
- Byōdō-in, a Japanese Buddhist temple (located in the Kyoto Prefecture), changes its name by order of Fujiwara no Yorimichi.

== Births ==
- May 23 – Philip I ("the Amorous"), king of France (d. 1108)
- September/October – Conrad II ("the Child"), duke of Bavaria (d. 1055)
- Agnes of Aquitaine, countess of Savoy (approximate date)
- Dirk V, count of Friesland (west of the Vlie) (d. 1091)
- Edgar Ætheling, uncrowned king of England (d. c. 1126) (approximate date)
- Gleb Svyatoslavich, Kievan prince (approximate date)
- Jón Ögmundsson, Icelandic bishop and saint (d. 1121)
- Robert of Bellême, 3rd Earl of Shrewsbury, Norman nobleman (approximate date)
- Roman Svyatoslavich, Kievan prince (approximate date)

== Deaths ==
- March 6 – Emma of Normandy, queen consort of England (twice), Denmark and Norway (b. 984)
- May 6 – Boniface III, Italian prince and margrave (assassinated)
- June 2/4 – assassinations
  - Guaimar IV of Salerno, Italian nobleman
  - Pandulf III of Salerno, Lombard prince
  - Pandulf of Capaccio, Lombard nobleman
- June 19 – Fan Zhongyan, chancellor of the Song dynasty (b. 989)
- October 4 – Vladimir Yaroslavich, Grand Prince of Kiev (b. 1020)
- October 27 – Qirwash ibn al-Muqallad, Uqaylid emir
- December 14 – Aaron Scotus, Irish abbot and musician
- Amadeus I, count of Savoy (approximate date)
- Halinard, French archbishop (approximate date)
- Hugh II, count of Ponthieu (also lord of Abbeville)
- Rodulf, Norman missionary bishop and abbot
- Sweyn Godwinson (or Swein), English nobleman
- Xu Daoning, Chinese painter (approximate date)
- Xuedou Chongxian, Chinese Buddhist monk
