= Amlaoibh Ua Beolláin =

13th-century Catholic clergyman

Amlaoibh Ua Beolláin was Archdeacon of Drumcliffe. He died in 1255.
