= 1057 =

1057 in various calendars
- Gregorian calendar: 1057; MLVII
- Ab urbe condita: 1810
- Armenian calendar: 506; ԹՎ ՇԶ
- Assyrian calendar: 5807
- Balinese saka calendar: 978–979
- Bengali calendar: 463–464
- Berber calendar: 2007
- English Regnal year: N/A
- Buddhist calendar: 1601
- Burmese calendar: 419
- Byzantine calendar: 6565–6566
- Chinese calendar: 丙申年 (Fire Monkey); 3754 or 3547 — to — 丁酉年 (Fire Rooster); 3755 or 3548
- Coptic calendar: 773–774
- Discordian calendar: 2223
- Ethiopian calendar: 1049–1050
- Hebrew calendar: 4817–4818
- Hindu calendars
- Vikram Samvat: 1113–1114
- Shaka Samvat: 978–979
- Kali Yuga: 4157–4158
- Holocene calendar: 11057
- Igbo calendar: 57–58
- Iranian calendar: 435–436
- Islamic calendar: 448–449
- Japanese calendar: Tengi 5 (天喜５年)
- Javanese calendar: 960–961
- Julian calendar: 1057; MLVII
- Korean calendar: 3390
- Minguo calendar: 855 before ROC 民前855年
- Nanakshahi calendar: −411
- Seleucid era: 1368/1369 AG
- Thai solar calendar: 1599–1600
- Tibetan calendar: མེ་ཕོ་སྤྲེ་ལོ་ (male Fire-Monkey); 1183 or 802 or 30 — to — མེ་མོ་བྱ་ལོ་ (female Fire-Bird); 1184 or 803 or 31

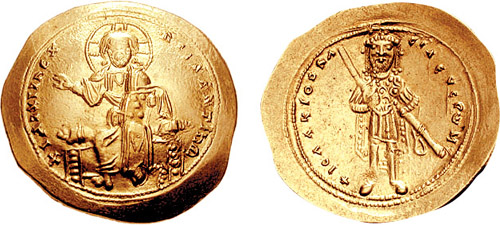
Coin of Emperor Isaac I (c. 1007–1060)

Year 1057 (MLVII) was a common year starting on Wednesday of the Julian calendar.

== Events ==
=== By place ===
==== Byzantine Empire ====
- June 8 – General Isaac Komnenos proclaims himself emperor in Paphlagonia (modern Turkey), and starts a civil war against Emperor Michael VI. He advances with a Byzantine expeditionary force towards Constantinople. At the same time, Michael sends an army against the rebels – western regiments and eastern ones (those from the Anatolic Theme and Charsianon) – to stop him.
- August 20 – Battle of Hades: Rebel forces under Isaac Komnenos defeat the Byzantines on the plains of Hades (near Nicaea). General Katakalon Kekaumenos routs the imperial right flank, and reaches the enemy's camp. He destroys the tents and supplies, which leaves the way open to Constantinople.
- September 1 – A riot in favor of Isaac Komnenos breaks out in Constantinople. Patriarch Michael I convinces Michael VI to abdicate the throne, and Isaac is crowned as emperor of the Byzantine Empire.

==== Europe ====
- August 15 – Battle of Lumphanan: Macbeth, King of Scotland ("the Red King") is killed by Malcolm ("Canmore"). Macbeth is succeeded by his stepson Lulach, who is crowned (probably on September 8) as king of Scotland at Scone.
- August – Battle of Varaville: Norman forces under William the Conqueror defeat a Franco-Angevin army at the mouth of the Dives. King Henry I of France on campaign in Normandy is forced to retreat his army.
- King Ferdinand I of León ("the Great") takes the cities of Lamego and Viseu (modern Portugal) from Christian lords allied to the Muslim Taifa of Silves.

==== Africa ====
- The Banu Hilal razes Kairouan (in modern Tunisia). The Zirid dynasty has to re-settle to Mahdia (approximate date).

==== Asia ====
- King Anawrahta captures Thaton, the capital of the Thaton Kingdom, strengthening Theravada Buddhism in Burma.

=== By topic ===
==== Religion ====
- July 28 – Pope Victor II dies after a 15-month pontificate at Arezzo. He is succeeded by Stephen IX as the 154th pope of the Catholic Church.

== Births ==
- Fujiwara no Kenshi, Japanese empress (d. 1084)
- Fujiwara no Nakazane, Japanese nobleman (d. 1118)
- Hugh, Count of Vermandois ("the Great"), French nobleman (d. 1101)
- Hugh I, Duke of Burgundy, French nobleman (House of Burgundy) (d. 1093)
- Ibn Tahir of Caesarea, Arab scholar and historian (d. 1113) (approximate date)
- Rhygyfarch, Welsh bishop of St. David's (d. 1099)
- William II (William Rufus), king of England (d. 1100) (approximate date)

== Deaths ==
- April 19 – Edward the Exile, son of Edmund II (Ironside)
- June 1 – Íñigo of Oña, Spanish Benedictine abbot
- June 26 – Otto, margrave of the Nordmark
- July 28 – Victor II, pope of the Catholic Church
- August 15 – Macbeth, king of Scotland (b. before 1040)
- August 28 – Abe no Yoritoki, Japanese samurai
- August 31 – Michael VI, Byzantine emperor
- September 28 – Otto III, duke of Swabia
- November 7 – Lothair Udo I, German nobleman (b. 994)
- Abul 'Ala Al-Ma'arri, Arabian philosopher (b. 973)
- Ala al-Din Abu'l-Ghana'im Sa'd, Buyid vizier
- Bruno II, margrave of Friesland (b. 1024)
- Di Qing, Chinese general (b. 1008)
- Heca (or Hecca), bishop of Selsey
- Humphrey of Hauteville, Norman nobleman
- Jōchō Busshi, Japanese sculptor
- Leofric, English earl and peerage
- Ostromir, Russian statesman (approximate date)
- Otto I (or Odon), Italian nobleman (approximate date)
- Pandulf VI (or Pandulf V), Italian nobleman
- Ralph the Timid, Norman nobleman
- Reginald I, French nobleman (b. 986)
- William fitz Giroie, Norman nobleman
