= Aenghus Ua hAenghusa =

Aenghus Ua hAenghusa was Archdeacon of Drumcliffe. He died in 1029.

According to the Annals of the Four Masters, under the year 1029:

Aodh Ua Ruairc, tigherna Dartraighe, & tigherna Coirpre & Aengus ua h-Aenghusa, airchinneach Droma Cliabh & trí fichet duine do losccadh imaille friu i n-Inis na Lainde h-i c-Coirpre Móir./Aedh Ua Ruairc, lord of Dartraighe; and the lord of Cairbre; and Aenghus Ua hAenghusa, airchinneach of Druim-cliabh; and three score persons along with them, were burned in Inis-na-lainne, in Cairbre-mor.

== See also ==
- Cairbre Drom Cliabh
