= 1053 =

1053 in various calendars
- Gregorian calendar: 1053; MLIII
- Ab urbe condita: 1806
- Armenian calendar: 502; ԹՎ ՇԲ
- Assyrian calendar: 5803
- Balinese saka calendar: 974–975
- Bengali calendar: 459–460
- Berber calendar: 2003
- English Regnal year: N/A
- Buddhist calendar: 1597
- Burmese calendar: 415
- Byzantine calendar: 6561–6562
- Chinese calendar: 壬辰年 (Water Dragon); 3750 or 3543 — to — 癸巳年 (Water Snake); 3751 or 3544
- Coptic calendar: 769–770
- Discordian calendar: 2219
- Ethiopian calendar: 1045–1046
- Hebrew calendar: 4813–4814
- Hindu calendars
- Vikram Samvat: 1109–1110
- Shaka Samvat: 974–975
- Kali Yuga: 4153–4154
- Holocene calendar: 11053
- Igbo calendar: 53–54
- Iranian calendar: 431–432
- Islamic calendar: 444–445
- Japanese calendar: Eishō 8 / Tengi 1 (天喜元年)
- Javanese calendar: 956–957
- Julian calendar: 1053; MLIII
- Korean calendar: 3386
- Minguo calendar: 859 before ROC 民前859年
- Nanakshahi calendar: −415
- Seleucid era: 1364/1365 AG
- Thai solar calendar: 1595–1596
- Tibetan calendar: ཆུ་ཕོ་འབྲུག་ལོ་ (male Water-Dragon); 1179 or 798 or 26 — to — ཆུ་མོ་སྦྲུལ་ལོ་ (female Water-Snake); 1180 or 799 or 27

Map of Battle of Civitate (Southern Italy). Papal forces (left) with blue banners.

Year 1053 (MLIII) was a common year starting on Friday of the Julian calendar.

== Events ==
=== By place ===
==== Byzantine Empire ====
- End of the Pecheneg Revolt: Emperor Constantine IX Monomachos makes peace with the Pechenegs. However, Pecheneg raids do not cease; they not only damage the economy by plundering, but Constantine is also forced to buy protection or peace from them by gifts, land grants, privileges and titles.

==== Europe ====
- June 18 – Battle of Civitate: Norman horsemen (3,000 men), led by Humphrey of Hauteville, count of Apulia and Calabria, rout the combined forces under Pope Leo IX, in Southern Italy. The Normans destroy the allied Papal army and capture Leo, who is imprisoned (as a hostage for 8 months) in Benevento.
- December – Conrad I, duke of Bavaria, is summoned to a Christmas court at Merseburg, and deposed by Emperor Henry III. He flees to King Andrew I in Hungary, and joins a coalition with the rebellious Welf III, duke of Carinthia. Henry's 4-year-old son Henry becomes the new duke of Bavaria.

==== England ====
- April – Harold Godwinson succeeds his father Godwin as earl of Wessex. He invites the exiled Edward the Exile, son of Edmund II, to return in the hope that he can claim the English throne from King Edward the Confessor.

=== By topic ===
==== Religion ====
- Jōchō sculpts Amida Buddha for the Byōdō-in Temple in Japan during the Heian period (approximate date).

== Births ==
- May 26 – Vladimir II, Grand Prince of Kiev (d. 1125)
- July 7 – Shirakawa, emperor of Japan (d. 1129)
- Berenguer Ramon II, count of Barcelona (approximate date)
- Guibert of Nogent, French historian and theologian (d. 1124) (approximate date)
- Hugh of Châteauneuf, bishop of Grenoble (d. 1132)
- Iorwerth ap Bleddyn, Welsh prince of Powys (d. 1111)
- Maria of Alania, Byzantine empress consort (d. 1118)
- Ramon Berenguer II, count of Barcelona (or 1054)
- Solomon (or Salomon), king of Hungary (d. 1087)
- Toba Sōjō, Japanese artist-monk (d. 1140)

== Deaths ==
- by January 5 – Rhys ap Rhydderch, Welsh co-ruler of Morgannwg, killed
- March 25 – Procopius of Sázava, Czech hermit
- April 15 – Godwin of Wessex, English nobleman
- October 25 – Enguerrand II, count of Ponthieu
- November 7 – Lazaros, Byzantine monk and stylite
- Abu'l-Fath an-Nasir ad-Dailami, imam of Yemen, killed
- Chananel ben Chushiel, Tunisian Jewish rabbi (b. 990)
- Cormac O'Ruadrach, Irish priest and archdeacon
- Liu Yong, Chinese poet of the Song dynasty (b. 987)
- Murchadh Ua Beolláin, Irish priest and archdeacon
- Wulfsige (or Wulsy), English bishop of Lichfield
