= 1069 =

1069 in various calendars
- Gregorian calendar: 1069; MLXIX
- Ab urbe condita: 1822
- Armenian calendar: 518; ԹՎ ՇԺԸ
- Assyrian calendar: 5819
- Balinese saka calendar: 990–991
- Bengali calendar: 475–476
- Berber calendar: 2019
- English Regnal year: 3 Will. 1 – 4 Will. 1
- Buddhist calendar: 1613
- Burmese calendar: 431
- Byzantine calendar: 6577–6578
- Chinese calendar: 戊申年 (Earth Monkey); 3766 or 3559 — to — 己酉年 (Earth Rooster); 3767 or 3560
- Coptic calendar: 785–786
- Discordian calendar: 2235
- Ethiopian calendar: 1061–1062
- Hebrew calendar: 4829–4830
- Hindu calendars
- Vikram Samvat: 1125–1126
- Shaka Samvat: 990–991
- Kali Yuga: 4169–4170
- Holocene calendar: 11069
- Igbo calendar: 69–70
- Iranian calendar: 447–448
- Islamic calendar: 461–462
- Japanese calendar: Jiryaku 5 / Enkyū 1 (延久元年)
- Javanese calendar: 973–974
- Julian calendar: 1069; MLXIX
- Korean calendar: 3402
- Minguo calendar: 843 before ROC 民前843年
- Nanakshahi calendar: −399
- Seleucid era: 1380/1381 AG
- Thai solar calendar: 1611–1612
- Tibetan calendar: ས་ཕོ་སྤྲེ་ལོ་ (male Earth-Monkey); 1195 or 814 or 42 — to — ས་མོ་བྱ་ལོ་ (female Earth-Bird); 1196 or 815 or 43

1069 (MLXIX) was a common year starting on Thursday of the Julian calendar, the 1069th year of the Common Era (CE) and Anno Domini (AD) designations, the 69th year of the 2nd millennium and the 11th century, and the 10th and last year of the 1060s decade. As of the start of 1069, the Gregorian calendar was 6 days ahead of the Julian calendar, which was the dominant calendar of the time.

Wang Anshi, Duke of Jing in Song dynasty China (1021–1086)

== Events ==
=== By place ===
==== Byzantine Empire ====
- Spring – Emperor Romanos IV begins a campaign against the Seljuk Turks, and marches towards the Euphrates via Melitene. He crosses the river at Romanopolis (modern Turkey), and captures the strategic fortress city of Chliat on the north-western shore of Lake Van. Romanos leaves a Byzantine rear guard on the upper Euphrates under General Philaretos Brachamios with orders to defend the Mesopotamian frontier.
- Seljuk forces under Alp Arslan defeat the Byzantine rear guard and advance deep into Cappadocia and Lycaonia. They plunder at will, but fail to capture the city of Iconium. Romanos retreats and returns to Constantinople. Alp Arslan takes advantage of Romanos' retreat and captures Manzikert. He recaptures the strategical fortress cities of Chliat and Van, consolidating his control over the Lake Van region.

==== Europe ====
- Spring – Romanos IV sends a Byzantine fleet (supported with an army) to relieve the siege of Bari. The Normans under Robert Guiscard defeat the Byzantines, and occupy the cities of Gravina and Obbiano in Apulia.
- February 28 – King Abbad II al-Mu'tadid dies after a 27-year reign. He is succeeded by his son Al-Mu'tamid ibn Abbad, who becomes the ruler of the Taifa of Seville in Al-Andalus (until 1091).

==== England ====
- January 28 – Northumbrians kill the new Norman earl of Northumbria, Robert de Comines, at Durham, and attack York.
- King Sweyn II of Denmark lands a fleet in the Humber in support of the Northumbrian rebels and they join him to burn York, attacking its two castles and destroying the old Minster.
- At Stafford, William the Conqueror swiftly defeats a rebellion led by Edwin, Earl of Mercia.
- Winter of 1069–1070 – Harrying of the North: King William the Conqueror quells rebellions made by his English subjects against his rule, campaigning through the north of England with his forces, burning houses, crops, cattle and land from York to Durham, resulting in the deaths of over 100,000 people, mainly from starvation and winter cold.

==== Asia ====
- Emperor Shenzong of Song China appoints Wang Anshi as his chief chancellor. He implements the New Policies, which include financial and trade reforms, defense and order, institution of the baojia system, etc.
- Nam tiến, the southward expansion of the territory of Đại Việt (modern Vietnam), begins when a Lý dynasty army attacks Champa, capturing King Rudravarman III.

== Births ==
- Anseau of Garlande, French nobleman (d. 1118)
- Kamakura Gongorō Kagemasa, Japanese samurai
- Leo Diogenes, Byzantine co-emperor (d. 1087)
- Approximate date
  - Mieszko Bolesławowic, Polish prince (d.1089)
  - Diego Gelmírez, Galician archbishop

== Deaths ==
- January 28 – Robert de Comines, English nobleman
- February 28 – Abbad II al-Mu'tadid, Abbadid king
- April 28 – Magnus II (Haraldsson), king of Norway
- August 15 – Ibn Hazm, Moorish historian (b. 994)
- September 11 – Ealdred, archbishop of York
- December 24 – Dedi II (the Younger), margrave of Lower Lusatia (b. c.997)
- Godfrey III (the Bearded), duke of Lower Lorraine
- Gytha Thorkelsdóttir, Danish noblewoman (b. 997)
- Pedro Seguin (or Seguini), bishop of Ourense
- Tilopa, Indian tantric practitioner (b. 988)
- Approximate date – Rhiwallon ap Cynfyn, Welsh king (b. c.1020)
