= Flann ua Becain =

Flann ua Becain was Archdeacon of Drumcliffe. He died in 950.

According to the Annals of the Four Masters, under the year 950:

Flann ua Becain, airchinneach Droma Cliabh, scribhnidhe Ereann, d'écc./Flann ua Becain, airchinneach of Druim-cliabh, scribe of Ireland, died.

== See also ==
- Erenagh
