= 1118 =

1118 in various calendars
- Gregorian calendar: 1118; MCXVIII
- Ab urbe condita: 1871
- Armenian calendar: 567; ԹՎ ՇԿԷ
- Assyrian calendar: 5868
- Balinese saka calendar: 1039–1040
- Bengali calendar: 524–525
- Berber calendar: 2068
- English Regnal year: 18 Hen. 1 – 19 Hen. 1
- Buddhist calendar: 1662
- Burmese calendar: 480
- Byzantine calendar: 6626–6627
- Chinese calendar: 丁酉年 (Fire Rooster); 3815 or 3608 — to — 戊戌年 (Earth Dog); 3816 or 3609
- Coptic calendar: 834–835
- Discordian calendar: 2284
- Ethiopian calendar: 1110–1111
- Hebrew calendar: 4878–4879
- Hindu calendars
- Vikram Samvat: 1174–1175
- Shaka Samvat: 1039–1040
- Kali Yuga: 4218–4219
- Holocene calendar: 11118
- Igbo calendar: 118–119
- Iranian calendar: 496–497
- Islamic calendar: 511–512
- Japanese calendar: Eikyū 6 / Gen'ei 1 (元永元年)
- Javanese calendar: 1023–1024
- Julian calendar: 1118; MCXVIII
- Korean calendar: 3451
- Minguo calendar: 794 before ROC 民前794年
- Nanakshahi calendar: −350
- Seleucid era: 1429/1430 AG
- Thai solar calendar: 1660–1661
- Tibetan calendar: མེ་མོ་བྱ་ལོ་ (female Fire-Bird); 1244 or 863 or 91 — to — ས་ཕོ་ཁྱི་ལོ་ (male Earth-Dog); 1245 or 864 or 92

Year 1118 (MCXVIII) was a common year starting on Tuesday of the Julian calendar.

== Events ==
=== By place ===
==== Byzantine Empire ====
- August 15 – Emperor Alexios I Komnenos dies after a 37-year reign, in which he has regained control over western Anatolia (modern Turkey). He stabilizes his frontiers against the wars with the Normans in the western Balkans, and the Seljuk Turks in the East. Alexios is succeeded by his 30-year-old son, John II Komnenos (the Good), as ruler of the Byzantine Empire.

==== Europe ====
- Peace between England and Flanders is agreed upon.

==== British Isles ====
- Enna mac Donnchada mac Murchada becomes King of Dublin in Ireland.
- Cu Faifne mac Congalaig becomes King of Uí Failghe in Ireland.
- Maelsechlainn Ua Faelain becomes King of the Déisi Muman in Ireland.
- The cantrefs of Rhos and Rhufoniog are annexed by Gruffudd ap Cynan, King of Gwynedd in Wales.
- The Archbishop of York is no longer required to be crowned by the Archbishop of Canterbury.
- Reconstruction begins on Peterborough Cathedral in England, destroyed by fire in 1116.

==== Eastern Europe ====
- Đorđe Vojislavljević ruler of Serbia, is overthrown by Uroš I of Raška.
- George I of Duklja is overthrown by his cousin Grubeša.
- Radostl becomes Bishop of Krakow.
- Zbraslav, now part of Prague, is founded.
- Sylvester of Kiev becomes bishop of Pereiaslav.

==== France ====
- A rebellion against Henry I of England breaks out in Normandy.
- Alberich of Rheims becomes Master at the school of Rheims.
- Charles I, Count of Flanders marries Margaret of Clermont.
- Peter Abelard and Héloïse d'Argenteuil have a child and marry secretly in Paris. Her uncle Fulbert has Abelard castrated, and both Abelard and Héloïse enter religious orders.
- Amaury IV de Montfort divorces his wife Richilde, daughter of Baldwin II of Hainaut.
- Wulgrin III becomes Count of Angoulême.
- Gervais becomes Count of Rethel.
- Montlhéry Castle is dismantled by Louis VI of France.

==== Germany ====
- Magdeburg is almost destroyed by fire.
- Reichenbach Abbey is founded.
- Zwickau, Eisenstadt, Kirchgandern, and Wolfenbüttel are first mentioned.
- Otto of Bamberg is suspended by the Pope, and Norbert of Xanten defends himself against charges of heresy, at the Synod of Fritzlar.

==== Italy ====
- January 24 – Pope Gelasius II succeeds Pope Paschal II as the 161st pope.
- March 10 – Gregory VIII is elected antipope.
- September 26 – Pisa Cathedral in the March of Tuscany is consecrated by Pope Gelasius II.
- The restoration of Santa Maria in Cosmedin begins.
- The economic competition between Milan and Como drives the two cities to war.

==== Scandinavia ====
- Upon the death of his brother Philip, Inge the Younger becomes sole king of Sweden.
- Þorlákur Runólfsson becomes Bishop of Skálholt.

==== Spain ====
- The Almoravids lose their control of the Ebro valley:
  - Pope Gelasius II grants the status of Crusade to the Christian effort in the Ebro Valley, attracting numerous Gascon, Occitan and Norman knights.
  - December 18 – Alfonso the Battler expels the Moors from Zaragoza. The Aragonese reconquer many of the valleys of the Jalón and the Jiloca.
  - The troops of Ramon Berenguer III, Count of Barcelona, led by archbishop Oleguer Bonestruga, capture Tarragona from the Moors.

==== East Asia ====
- The Genei era begins in Japan.
- The Zenghe era of Emperor Huizong of Song China ends, and the Chonghe era begins.
- The Yongning era of Emperor Chongzong of Western Xia ends.

==== Caucasus ====
- David IV of Georgia captures Lori from the Seljuk Turks.
- David IV of Georgia settles a number of Kipchaks in Georgia.

==== Western Asia ====
- June 11 – Roger of Salerno, Prince of Antioch, captures Azaz from the Seljuk Turks.
- The Byzantine general Philocales captures Sardis, from the Seljuk Sultanate of Rûm.
- Baldwin I of Jerusalem invades Egypt, but dies of an old wound.
- Baldwin of Le Bourg succeeds his cousin Baldwin I, as King of Jerusalem.
- Roman of Le Puy becomes lord of Oultrejordain.
- Joscelin I succeeds Baldwin of Le Bourg, as Count of Edessa.
- Garmond of Picquigny becomes Latin Patriarch of Jerusalem.
- Suleyman I ibn al-Ghazi becomes emir of Aleppo.
- Ahmed Sanjar and Mahmud II proclaim themselves rival Seljuk sultans, upon the death of Mehmed I of Great Seljuk.
- Al-Mustarshid becomes Abbasid caliph.
- Bahram Shah becomes Ghaznavid Emperor.
- Knights Templar were founded in Jerusalem

==== South Asia ====
- June 29 – Vikram Chola becomes regent of the Chola kingdom.
- Battle of Kennagal: The Hoysala Empire defeats the Chalukya

== Births ==
- November 28 – Manuel I Komnenos, Byzantine emperor (d. 1180)
- Ahmad al-Rifa'i, Arab founder of the Rifa'i Sufi Order
- Andronikos I Komnenos, Byzantine emperor (d. 1185)
- Christina of Denmark, queen of Norway (approximate date)
- Gualdim Pais, Portuguese knight and Grand Master (d. 1195)
- Hartwig of Stade, archbishop of Bremen (d. 1168)
- Narathu, Burmese ruler of the Pagan Kingdom (d. 1171)
- Nur ad-Din, Seljuk ruler of Damascus and Aleppo (d. 1174)
- Odo II, French nobleman (House of Burgundy) (d. 1162)
- Roger III, Norman duke of Apulia and Calabria (d. 1148)
- Roger of Worcester, English bishop (approximate date)
- Saigyō Hōshi, Japanese poet and writer (d. 1190)
- Taira no Kiyomori, Japanese military leader (d. 1181)
- Vakhtang (or Tsuata), Georgian nobleman (d. 1138)

== Deaths ==
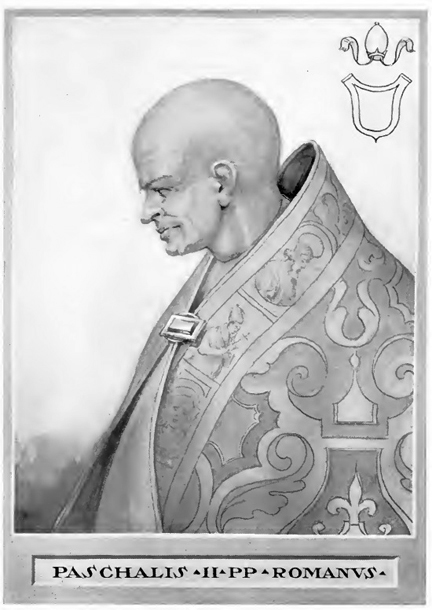
Pope Paschal II d. January 21, 1118

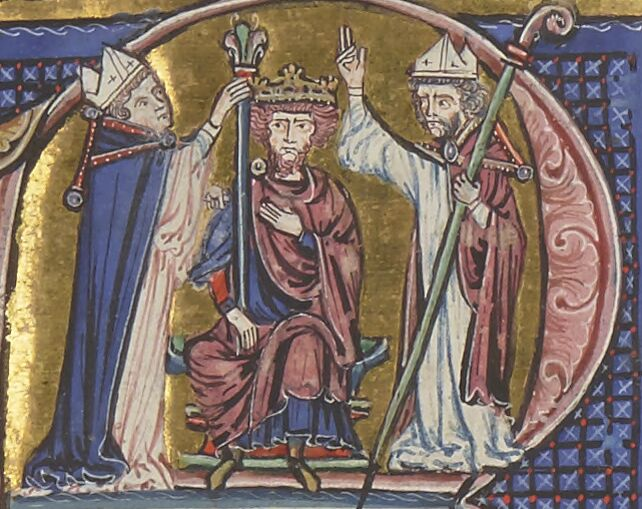
Baldwin I of Jerusalem d. April 2, 1118

- January 21 – Paschal II, pope of the Catholic Church
- April 2 – Baldwin I (of Boulogne), king of Jerusalem
- April 16
  - Adelaide del Vasto, countess of Sicily
  - William d'Évreux, Norman nobleman
- May 1 – Matilda of Scotland, queen of England (b. c.1080)
- June 5 – Robert de Beaumont, 1st Earl of Leicester
- July 3 – Raymond of Toulouse, French chanter
- August 6 – Al-Mustazhir, Abbasid caliph (b. 1078)
- August 15 – Alexios I Komnenos, Byzantine emperor
- November 28 – Philippa, French noblewoman
- Al-Tighnari, Arab botanist and physician (b. 1073)
- Anseau of Garlande, French nobleman (b. 1069)
- Arnulf of Chocques, patriarch of Jerusalem
- Arslan-Shah, sultan of the Ghaznavid Empire
- Basil the Physician, Bogomil religious leader
- Bernard II (or William), count of Cerdanya
- Diarmait Ua Briain, king of Munster
- Florence of Worcester, English monk
- Fujiwara no Nakazane, Japanese nobleman (b. 1057)
- Furong Daokai, Chinese Buddhist monk (b. 1043)
- George of Chqondidi, Georgian archbishop
- Gissur Ísleifsson, Icelandic bishop
- Helperich, margrave of the Nordmark
- Hugh I, French nobleman (b. 1040)
- Jaquinta of Bari, queen of Duklja
- Lidanus, Lombard Benedictine abbot (b. 1026)
- Maria of Alania, Byzantine empress (b. 1053)
- Milo II of Montlhéry, French nobleman
- Muhammad I (Tapar), Seljuk sultan (b. 1082)
- Philip, king of Sweden (House of Stenkil)
- Ruaidrí na Saide Buide, king of Connacht
- Vladimir II, king of Duklja (approximate date)
- William V of Angoulême, French nobleman
