= Varaville =

- Commune
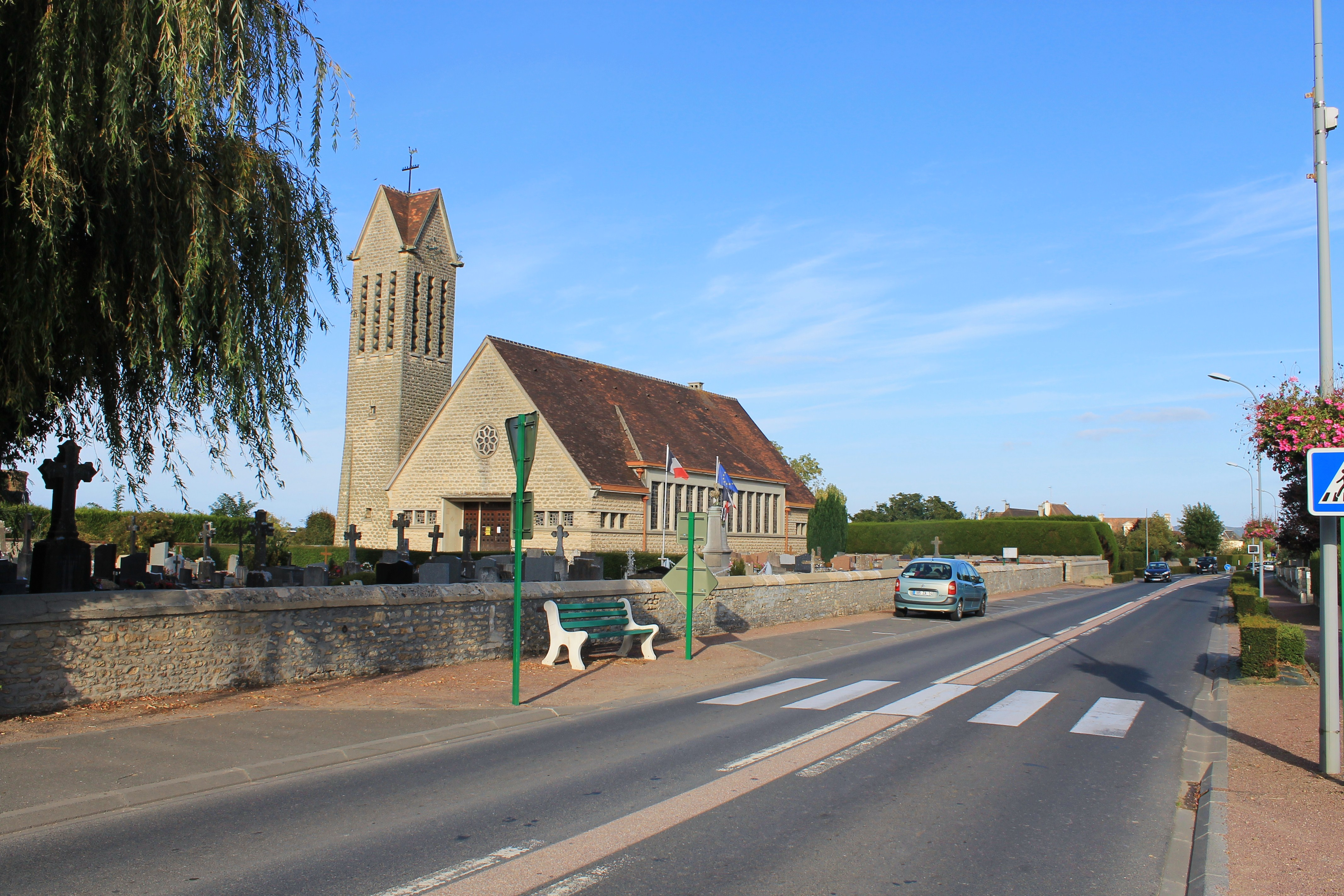
- The church in Varaville

- Coat of arms
- Location of Varaville
- Location within France Location within Normandy
- Coordinates: 49°15′15″N 0°09′25″W
- Country: France
- Region: Normandy
- Department: Calvados
- Arrondissement: Lisieux
- Canton: Cabourg
- Intercommunality: CC Normandie-Cabourg-Pays d'Auge

Government
  - Mayor (2020–2026): Patrick Thibout
- Area^{1}: 16.49 km^{2} (6.37 sq mi)
- Elevation: 20 m (66 ft)
- Highest elevation: 20 m (66 ft)
- Lowest elevation: 2 m (6.6 ft)
- Population (2023): 1,022
  - Density: 61.98/km^{2} (160.5/sq mi)
- Time zone: UTC+01:00 (CET)
  - Summer (DST): UTC+02:00 (CEST)
- INSEE/Postal code: 14724 /14390
- ^{1} French Land Register data, which excludes lakes, ponds, glaciers > 1 km^{2} (0.386 sq mi or 247 acres) and river estuaries.

Varaville (French pronunciation: [vaʁavil]) is a commune in the Calvados department in the Normandy region in northwestern France.

It gives its name to the Battle of Varaville, which was fought in 1057.

== Population ==
Historical population
Year	Pop.	±% p.a.
1968	511	—
1975	595	+2.20%
1982	729	+2.94%
1990	826	+1.57%
1999	815	−0.15%
2007	754	−0.97%
2012	937	+4.44%
2017	954	+0.36%
2023	1,022	+1.15%
Source: INSEE

== See also ==
- Communes of the Calvados department
