= Bishop of Fore =

The Bishop of was head of an historic Irish diocese, firstly subsumed by the Diocese of Meath and now within the Diocese of Meath and Kildare.

Its hub was the settlement of Fore, County Westmeath.

== Bishops ==
Bishops of Fore
From	Until	Incumbent	Notes
745	765	Suarlech	"Abbat and Bishop of Fore; died 27 March that year (Archdall ibid)
765	766	Ardgene	
unknown	869	Gnia	"Abbat and Bishop" (Archdall)
unknown	882	Ailioll	
unknown	887	Cormac	"also Coadjutor Bishop of Clonmacnoise" (Archdall)
unknown	927	Moel Poile	

== Senior clergy ==
The only recorded officer of the diocese below that of bishop is Cormac O'Ruadrach.
