= 1059 =

1059 in various calendars
- Gregorian calendar: 1059; MLIX
- Ab urbe condita: 1812
- Armenian calendar: 508; ԹՎ ՇԸ
- Assyrian calendar: 5809
- Balinese saka calendar: 980–981
- Bengali calendar: 465–466
- Berber calendar: 2009
- English Regnal year: N/A
- Buddhist calendar: 1603
- Burmese calendar: 421
- Byzantine calendar: 6567–6568
- Chinese calendar: 戊戌年 (Earth Dog); 3756 or 3549 — to — 己亥年 (Earth Pig); 3757 or 3550
- Coptic calendar: 775–776
- Discordian calendar: 2225
- Ethiopian calendar: 1051–1052
- Hebrew calendar: 4819–4820
- Hindu calendars
- Vikram Samvat: 1115–1116
- Shaka Samvat: 980–981
- Kali Yuga: 4159–4160
- Holocene calendar: 11059
- Igbo calendar: 59–60
- Iranian calendar: 437–438
- Islamic calendar: 450–451
- Japanese calendar: Kōhei 2 (康平２年)
- Javanese calendar: 962–963
- Julian calendar: 1059; MLIX
- Korean calendar: 3392
- Minguo calendar: 853 before ROC 民前853年
- Nanakshahi calendar: −409
- Seleucid era: 1370/1371 AG
- Thai solar calendar: 1601–1602
- Tibetan calendar: ས་ཕོ་ཁྱི་ལོ་ (male Earth-Dog); 1185 or 804 or 32 — to — ས་མོ་ཕག་ལོ་ (female Earth-Boar); 1186 or 805 or 33

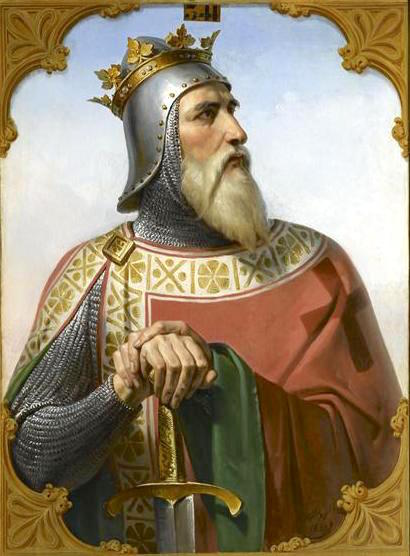
Duke Robert Guiscard (c. 1015–1085)

Year 1059 (MLIX) was a common year starting on Friday of the Julian calendar.

== Events ==
=== By place ===
==== Byzantine Empire ====
- November 22 – Emperor Isaac I Komnenos falls ill on a hunt and retires to a monastery after a 2-year reign. He abdicates the Byzantine throne and appoints Constantine X, a Paphlagonian nobleman, as his successor.
- Fall – The Magyars cross the Danube River, together with several Pecheneg tribes, but are halted by Byzantine forces (approximate date).

==== Europe ====
- Peter Krešimir IV is crowned king of Croatia and Dalmatia. His coronation is recognised by the Byzantine Empire who confirm him as the supreme ruler of the Dalmatian cities, i.e. over the Theme of Dalmatia – excluding the theme of Ragusa and the Duchy of Durazzo.
- August 23 – Robert Guiscard, count of Apulia and Calabria, signs the Treaty of Melfi with Pope Nicholas II. Nicholas recognises the Norman conquest of southern Italy, and accepts the titles of Guiscard as duke of Sicily.
- In Seljuk Empire Alp Arslan succeeds his father Chaghri Beg as governor of Khorasan. He crosses with a Seljuk expeditionary force the upper Halys River and plunders the Theme of Sebasteia (modern Turkey).

==== Asia ====
- March – Emperor Lý Thánh Tông of Đại Việt ordered a military campaign into Qinzhou of the Song. Thánh Tông's royal court justified the campaign as "a punishment for the arrogance of the Song."

=== By topic ===
==== Religion ====
- January 24 – Pope Nicholas II succeeds Stephen IX as the 155th pope of the Catholic Church. He is installed in Rome in opposition to Antipope Benedict X – the brother of the late Pope Benedict IX (deposed in 1048).
- April 13 – Nicholas II, with the agreement of the Lateran Council, issues the papal bull In nomine Domini, making the College of Cardinals the sole voters in the papal conclave for the election of popes.

== Births ==
- At-Turtushi, Andalusian political philosopher (d. 1126)
- Fujiwara no Akinaka, Japanese nobleman (d. 1129)
- Fulcher of Chartres, French priest and chronicler (approximate date)
- Henry I, count of Limburg and Arlon (approximate date)
- Ngok Loden Sherab, Tibetan Buddhist monk (d. 1109)
- Raynald I, French nobleman and abbot (d. 1090)
- Robert of Burgundy, bishop of Langres (d. 1111)

== Deaths ==
- January 21 – Michael I Cerularius, Byzantine patriarch
- April 4 – Farrukh-Zad, Ghaznavid sultan (b. 1025)
- June 29 – Bernard II, German nobleman
- July 7 – Abdallah ibn Yasin, Almoravid ruler
- August 14 – Giselbert, count of Luxembourg
- Cathal mac Tigernán, Irish king of Iar Connacht
- Eilika of Schweinfurt, German noblewoman (after December 10)
- Michael VI Bringas, Byzantine emperor
- Peter Orseolo ("the Venetian"), king of Hungary (possible date)
- Vyacheslav Yaroslavich, prince of Smolensk
