= Rodulf =

Rodulf may refer to:

- Rodulf (petty king), 5th-century ruler of the Ranii tribe
- Rodulf (archbishop of Bourges), Frankish prelate and saint who died 866
- Rodulf Haraldsson, Viking leader who died in 873
- Rodulfus Glaber, chronicler who died 1047
- Rodulf (missionary bishop in Norway), abbot of Abingdon (1051–52)
- Rodulf of Ivry, Norman nobleman
- Rudolf of St Trond or Rodulf (died 1138), abbot and composer
- Rodulff or Rodulf, possibly legendary 12th-century Finnish bishop
- Rodulf II de Warenne, Norman nobleman

== See also ==
- Rudolph (disambiguation)
