= 1072 =

1072 in various calendars
- Gregorian calendar: 1072; MLXXII
- Ab urbe condita: 1825
- Armenian calendar: 521; ԹՎ ՇԻԱ
- Assyrian calendar: 5822
- Balinese saka calendar: 993–994
- Bengali calendar: 478–479
- Berber calendar: 2022
- English Regnal year: 6 Will. 1 – 7 Will. 1
- Buddhist calendar: 1616
- Burmese calendar: 434
- Byzantine calendar: 6580–6581
- Chinese calendar: 辛亥年 (Metal Pig); 3769 or 3562 — to — 壬子年 (Water Rat); 3770 or 3563
- Coptic calendar: 788–789
- Discordian calendar: 2238
- Ethiopian calendar: 1064–1065
- Hebrew calendar: 4832–4833
- Hindu calendars
- Vikram Samvat: 1128–1129
- Shaka Samvat: 993–994
- Kali Yuga: 4172–4173
- Holocene calendar: 11072
- Igbo calendar: 72–73
- Iranian calendar: 450–451
- Islamic calendar: 464–465
- Japanese calendar: Enkyū 4 (延久４年)
- Javanese calendar: 976–977
- Julian calendar: 1072; MLXXII
- Korean calendar: 3405
- Minguo calendar: 840 before ROC 民前840年
- Nanakshahi calendar: −396
- Seleucid era: 1383/1384 AG
- Thai solar calendar: 1614–1615
- Tibetan calendar: ལྕགས་མོ་ཕག་ལོ་ (female Iron-Boar); 1198 or 817 or 45 — to — ཆུ་ཕོ་བྱི་བ་ལོ་ (male Water-Rat); 1199 or 818 or 46

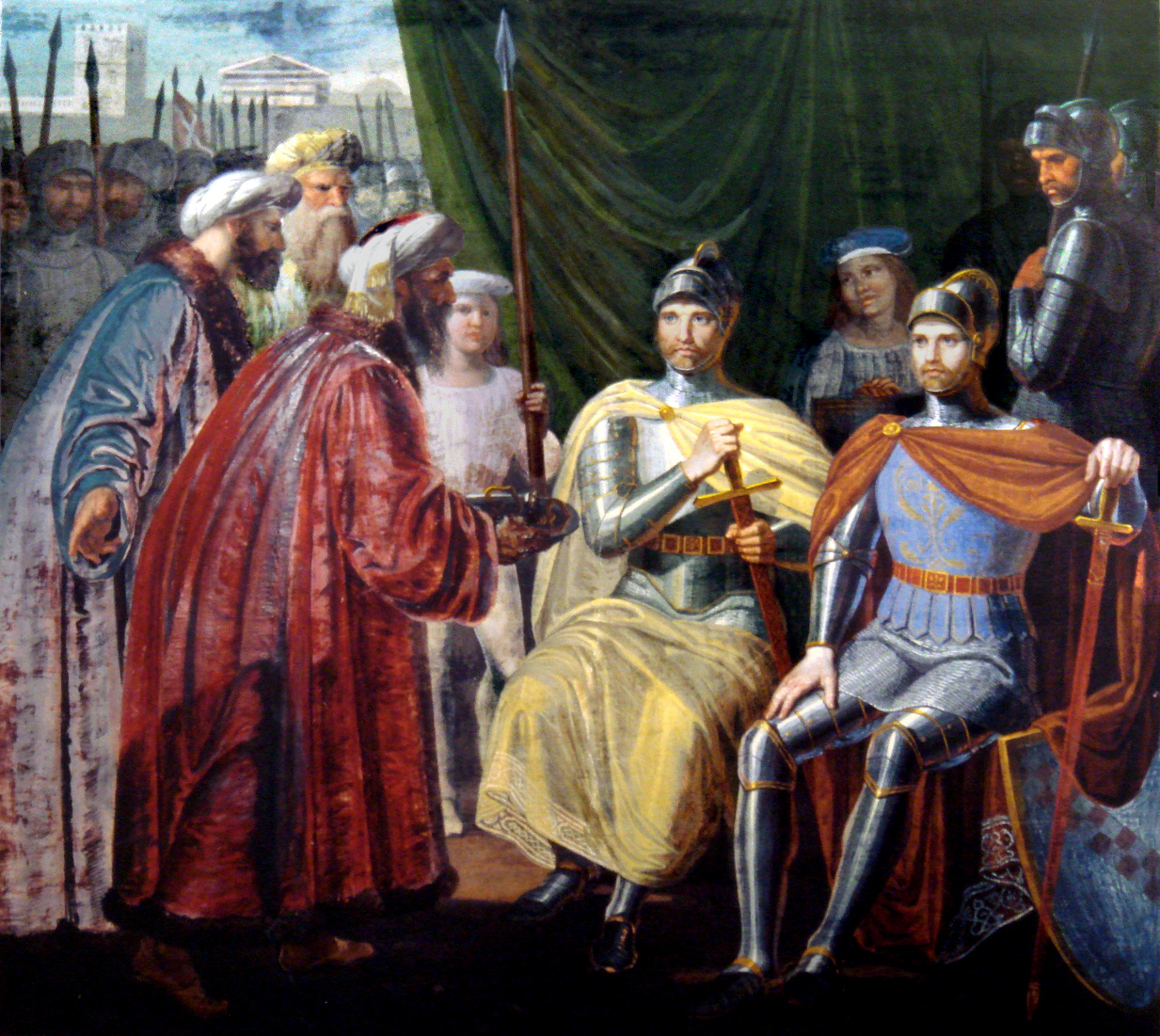
Roger I of Sicily receiving the keys of Palermo.

Year 1072 (MLXXII) was a leap year starting on Sunday of the Julian calendar.

== Events ==
=== By place ===
==== Byzantine Empire ====
- June 29 – Romanos IV Diogenes, deposed ruler of the Byzantine Empire, is blinded and sent into exile to the island of Proti (in the Sea of Marmara) at the Monastery of Transfiguration. A few days before his death, he receives a letter from Michael Psellos (his political advisor), congratulating him on the loss of his eyes.
- Byzantine–Hungarian War (1071–1072): the Hungarians plunders the Balkans on their route to Niš. The war ends with the emerging internal conflict between Solomon, King of Hungary and his cousin, Duke Géza.

==== Europe ====
- January 10 – The Normans under Robert Guiscard and his brother Roger I ("Boso") conquer Palermo (after a one year siege). Roger receives the keys of the city, and Robert invests him with the title of Count of Sicily. The Emirate of Sicily rules only the southern part of the island, with Syracuse as the capital (until 1091).
- January – Battle of Golpejera: King Sancho II ("the Strong") defeats the Castilian forces of his brother Alfonso VI ("the Brave") near Carrión de los Condes. Alfonso is captured, but released into exile, where he seeks refuge in the Taifa of Toledo (under the protection of his vassal, Emir Al-Mamun).
- October 7 – Alfonso VI becomes king of León and Castile, following the assassination of Sancho II. He is bestowed with the title of "Emperor of Spain", and is forced by El Cid (Rodrigo Diaz de Vivar), the standard-bearer of Sancho, to take an oath denying any involvement in his brother's death.

==== Britain ====
- May 27 – The Accord of Winchester establishes the primacy of the Archbishop of Canterbury over the Archbishop of York, in the Church of England.
- William the Conqueror, King of England, invades Scotland and receives the submission of King Malcolm III. He agrees to sign the Treaty of Abernethy.

==== Seljuk Empire ====
- December 15 – Sultan Alp Arslan ("Heroic Lion") dies after a 9-year reign, during his campaign in Transoxiana. He is succeeded by his 17-year-old son Malik-Shah I, who is declared new ruler of the Seljuk Empire. Qavurt, a brother of Alp Arslan, claims the Seljuk throne for himself and occupies the capital of Isfahan.

==== China ====
- Shen Kuo, Chinese polymathic scientist and statesman, is appointed as the head official for the Bureau of Astronomy – where he begins his work with the colleague Wei Pu on accurately plotting the orbital paths of the stars, planets, and moon three times a night for a continuum of five years.
- Fall – Shen Kuo is sent to supervise Wang Anshi's program of surveying the buildup of silt deposits in the Grand Canal, outside the capital city of Kaifeng. Using an original technique, Shen successfully dredges the canal and demonstrates the formidable value of the silt gathered as a fertilizer.

=== By topic ===
==== Literature ====
- Dīwān Lughāt al-Turk, an informative book written by Mahmud al-Kashgari about the Turks, is presented to the ruler of the Kara-Khanid Khanate.

== Births ==
- Agnes of Aquitaine, queen of Aragon and Navarre (d. 1097)
- Agnes of Waiblingen, daughter of Henry IV (or 1073)
- Welf II (or Welfhard), duke of Bavaria (d. 1120)
- Wulfhilde of Saxony, German noblewoman (d. 1126)

== Deaths ==
- February 1 – Lý Thánh Tông, Vietnamese emperor (b. 1023)
- February 7 – Diarmait mac Máel na mBó, Irish king of Leinster
- February 22
  - Peter Damian, cardinal-bishop of Ostia (or 1073)
  - Stigand, Anglo-Saxon archbishop of Canterbury
- March 16 – Adalbert, archbishop of Hamburg
- March 28 – Ordulf (or Otto), duke of Saxony
- August 19 – Hawise, duchess of Brittany
- September 22 – Ouyang Xiu, Chinese historian and poet (b. 1007)
- October 7 – Sancho II, king of Castile and León
- October 15 – Æthelric, bishop of Durham
- November 13 – Adalbero III of Luxembourg, German nobleman
- November 24 – Bagrat IV, king of Georgia (b. 1018)
- December 15 – Alp Arslan, sultan of the Seljuk Empire (b. 1029)
- December 30 – Al-Qushayri, Persian Sufi scholar and theologian (b. 986)
- Honorius II, antipope of the Catholic Church
- Maredudd ab Owain ab Edwin, Welsh prince
- Otloh of Sankt Emmeram, German monk (approximate date)
- Qatran Tabrizi, Persian poet and writer (b. 1009)
- Romanos IV Diogenes, ruler of the Byzantine Empire
- Serlo II of Hauteville (or Sarlo), Norman nobleman
