= 986 =

Calendar year

986 in various calendars
- Gregorian calendar: 986; CMLXXXVI
- Ab urbe condita: 1739
- Armenian calendar: 435; ԹՎ ՆԼԵ
- Assyrian calendar: 5736
- Balinese saka calendar: 907–908
- Bengali calendar: 392–393
- Berber calendar: 1936
- Buddhist calendar: 1530
- Burmese calendar: 348
- Byzantine calendar: 6494–6495
- Chinese calendar: 乙酉年 (Wood Rooster); 3683 or 3476 — to — 丙戌年 (Fire Dog); 3684 or 3477
- Coptic calendar: 702–703
- Discordian calendar: 2152
- Ethiopian calendar: 978–979
- Hebrew calendar: 4746–4747
- Hindu calendars
- Vikram Samvat: 1042–1043
- Shaka Samvat: 907–908
- Kali Yuga: 4086–4087
- Holocene calendar: 10986
- Iranian calendar: 364–365
- Islamic calendar: 375–376
- Japanese calendar: Kanna 2 (寛和２年)
- Javanese calendar: 887–888
- Julian calendar: 986; CMLXXXVI
- Korean calendar: 3319
- Minguo calendar: 926 before ROC 民前926年
- Nanakshahi calendar: −482
- Seleucid era: 1297/1298 AG
- Thai solar calendar: 1528–1529
- Tibetan calendar: ཤིང་མོ་བྱ་ལོ་ (female Wood-Bird); 1112 or 731 or −41 — to — མེ་ཕོ་ཁྱི་ལོ་ (male Fire-Dog); 1113 or 732 or −40

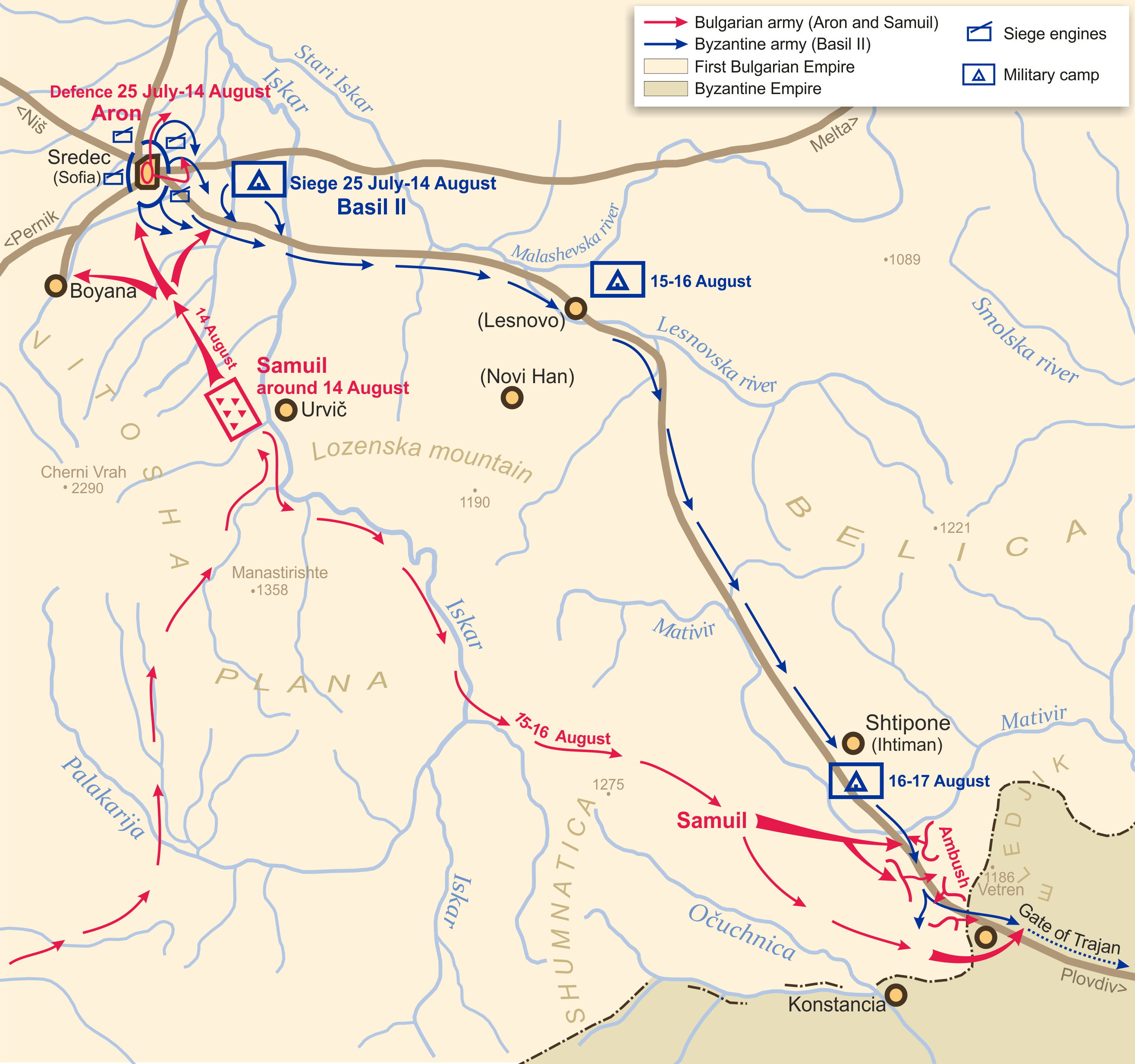
Map of the Battle of the Gates of Trajan

Year 986 (CMLXXXVI) was a common year starting on Friday of the Julian calendar.

== Events ==
=== By place ===
==== Byzantine Empire ====
- August 17 – Battle of the Gates of Trajan: Emperor Basil II leads a Byzantine expeditionary force (30,000 men) against the Bulgarians to capture the fortress city of Sredets. After a siege of 20 days, Basil is forced to retreat from the Sofia Valley towards the town of Ihtiman (through a passage known as the Gate of Trajan). The Bulgarians under Tsar Samuel ambush and defeat the Byzantine forces. Only the elite Varangian Guard escapes with heavy casualties and leads Basil to safety through secondary routes.

==== Europe ====
- March 2 – King Lothair III (or Lothair IV) dies after a 32-year reign at Laon. He is succeeded by his 19-year-old son Louis V as ruler of the West Frankish Kingdom.
- Summer: Al-Mansur, the de facto ruler of Al-Andalus, continues his effort in the north of the Iberian Peninsula and plunders the city of Coimbra (modern Portugal).
- Empress Theophanu, accompanied by the 6-year-old King Otto III and Henry II of Bavaria, leads a campaign against Bohemia and the Slavs on the Elbe frontier.
- Mieszko I, duke (de facto) ruler of Poland, pledges his allegiance to Otto III and the Holy Roman Empire. He promises assistance in Otto's war against the Slavs.
- Battle of Hjörungavágr: The Earls of Lade under Haakon Sigurdsson (the Powerful) defeat a Danish invasion force led by the Jomsvikings in western Norway.
- Winter – King Harald II (Bluetooth) dies after a 28-year reign (driven into exile). He is succeeded by his son Sweyn Forkbeard as ruler of Denmark and Norway.

==== Arabian Empire ====
- Winter – Sabuktigin, emir of the Ghaznavid Dynasty, invades India. He expands the emirate between the Kabul Valley and the Indus River after defeating King Jayapala.

==== Asia ====
- Emperor Kazan abdicates the throne after a political struggle from the Fujiwara family. He is succeeded by his 6-year-old cousin Ichijō as the 66th emperor (tennō) of Japan.
- Summer – Chi Go Pass Campaign: The Song Dynasty sends armies on three fronts against the Liao Dynasty in the Sixteen Prefectures, but they are defeated on all fronts.

=== By topic ===
==== Exploration ====
- Bjarni Herjólfsson, a Norse-Icelandic merchant captain and explorer, becomes the first inhabitant of the Old World to discover the mainland of the Americas.

==== Literature ====
- One of the Four Great Books of Song, the Chinese encyclopedia Finest Blossoms in the Garden of Literature is finished, with a total of 1,000 volumes.

== Births ==
- Al-Qushayri, Persian Sufi scholar and theologian (d. 1072)
- Æthelstan Ætheling, son of Æthelred II (the Unready) (d. 1014)
- Bezprym (or Besfrim), duke of Poland (approximate date)
- Constance of Arles, French queen (approximate date)
- Lê Long Đĩnh, emperor of the Lê Dynasty (d. 1009)
- Poppo, archbishop of Trier (approximate date)
- Reginald I, count palatine of Burgundy (d. 1057)

== Deaths ==
- March 2 – Lothair III, king of the West Frankish Kingdom (b. 941)
- May 25 – Abd al-Rahman al-Sufi, Persian astronomer (b. 903)
- August – Yang Ye, Chinese general and governor (jiedushi)
- August 15 – Minnborinus, Irish missionary and abbot
- unknown date
  - Bahram ibn Ardashir al-Majusi, Buyid official and general
  - Cadwallon ab Ieuaf, king of Gwynedd (Wales)
- probable
  - Æthelstan Mannessune, English landowner
  - Bobo, Frankish warrior and pilgrim
