= 1087 =

1087 in various calendars
- Gregorian calendar: 1087; MLXXXVII
- Ab urbe condita: 1840
- Armenian calendar: 536; ԹՎ ՇԼԶ
- Assyrian calendar: 5837
- Balinese saka calendar: 1008–1009
- Bengali calendar: 493–494
- Berber calendar: 2037
- English Regnal year: 21 Will. 1 – 1 Will. 2
- Buddhist calendar: 1631
- Burmese calendar: 449
- Byzantine calendar: 6595–6596
- Chinese calendar: 丙寅年 (Fire Tiger); 3784 or 3577 — to — 丁卯年 (Fire Rabbit); 3785 or 3578
- Coptic calendar: 803–804
- Discordian calendar: 2253
- Ethiopian calendar: 1079–1080
- Hebrew calendar: 4847–4848
- Hindu calendars
- Vikram Samvat: 1143–1144
- Shaka Samvat: 1008–1009
- Kali Yuga: 4187–4188
- Holocene calendar: 11087
- Igbo calendar: 87–88
- Iranian calendar: 465–466
- Islamic calendar: 479–480
- Japanese calendar: Ōtoku 4 / Kanji 1 (寛治元年)
- Javanese calendar: 991–992
- Julian calendar: 1087; MLXXXVII
- Korean calendar: 3420
- Minguo calendar: 825 before ROC 民前825年
- Nanakshahi calendar: −381
- Seleucid era: 1398/1399 AG
- Thai solar calendar: 1629–1630
- Tibetan calendar: མེ་ཕོ་སྟག་ལོ་ (male Fire-Tiger); 1213 or 832 or 60 — to — མེ་མོ་ཡོས་ལོ་ (female Fire-Hare); 1214 or 833 or 61

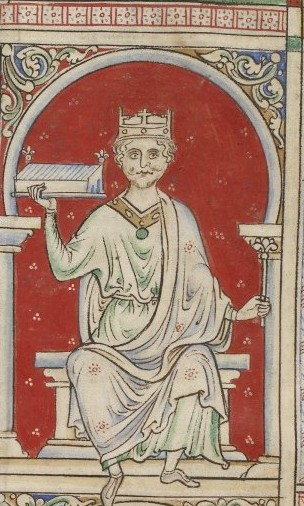
King William II of England (c. 1056–1100)

Year 1087 (MLXXXVII) was a common year starting on Friday of the Julian calendar.

== Events ==
=== By place ===
==== Europe ====
- Summer – The Taifa of Valencia falls under the domination of El Cid. He stabilizes the region around Valencia, which has revolted against the Moorish puppet ruler Al-Qadir.
- Inge the Elder returns to Svealand and kills his brother-in-law Blot-Sweyn after a 3-year reign. Inge again proclaims himself king of Sweden (approximate date).

==== England ====
- September 9 – William the Conqueror dies in Rouen after a fall from his horse. He is succeeded as king of England by his third son William II.
- A fire in London destroys much of the city, including St. Paul's Cathedral. Bishop Maurice starts the rebuilding of a new, much larger cathedral.

==== Africa ====
- Mahdia campaign: The navies of Genoa and Pisa take the capital of the Zirids, and occupy Mahdia for a year. Subsequently, both republics obtain trading privileges.
- Completion of Bab al-Futuh, Cairo

==== Japan ====
- January 3 – Emperor Shirakawa abdicates in favor of his 7-year-old son Horikawa after a 14-year reign. He exerts his personal power to set the cloistered rule system further in motion.

==== Middle East ====
- May: The marriage of Caliph al-Muqtadi and Mah-i Mulk is consummated. This marriage strengthens the political relation of Malik-Shah I and the Caliph.

=== By topic ===
==== Religion ====
- May 9 – The relics of Saint Nicholas, patron saint of seafarers, are stolen by Italian sailors from his church in Myra (modern Turkey) and transported to Bari in southern Italy.
- September 16 – Pope Victor III dies after a 1-year pontificate at Monte Cassino. He is buried in the abbey's chapter house.

== Births ==
- September 13 – John II Komnenos, Byzantine emperor (d. 1143)
- Ibn Quzman, Andalusian poet and writer (approximate date)
- Reginald III (or Renaud), count of Burgundy (approximate date)
- Theoderich van Are (or Dietrich), German nobleman (d. 1126)

== Deaths ==
- June 9 – Otto I ("the Fair"), prince of Olomouc (b. 1045)
- June 27 – Henry the Long, margrave of the Nordmark
- September 9 – William the Conqueror, king of England
- September 16 – Victor III, pope of the Catholic Church
- September 25 – Simon I, French nobleman (b. 1025)
- November 12 – William I of Burgundy, French nobleman (b. 1020)
- December 13 – Maria Dobroniega, duchess of Poland
- December 27 – Bertha of Savoy, Holy Roman Empress (b. 1051)
- Abu Bakr ibn Umar, military leader of the Almoravids
- Abū Ishāq Ibrāhīm al-Zarqālī, Arab astrologer (b. 1029)
- Arnold of Soissons (or Arnoul), French bishop (b. 1040)
- Asma bint Shihab, queen and co-regent of Yemen
- Blot-Sweyn, king of Svealand (approximate date)
- Eustace II of Boulogne (approximate date)
- Leo Diogenes, Byzantine co-emperor (b. 1069)
- Solomon (or Salomon), king of Hungary (b. 1053)
- Yaropolk Izyaslavich, prince of Turov and Volhyn
