= Murchadh Ua Beolláin =

Drumcliffan Archdeacon

Murchadh Ua Beolláin was Archdeacon of Drumcliffe. He died in 1053.
