= 1091 =

1091 in various calendars
- Gregorian calendar: 1091; MXCI
- Ab urbe condita: 1844
- Armenian calendar: 540; ԹՎ ՇԽ
- Assyrian calendar: 5841
- Balinese saka calendar: 1012–1013
- Bengali calendar: 497–498
- Berber calendar: 2041
- English Regnal year: 4 Will. 2 – 5 Will. 2
- Buddhist calendar: 1635
- Burmese calendar: 453
- Byzantine calendar: 6599–6600
- Chinese calendar: 庚午年 (Metal Horse); 3788 or 3581 — to — 辛未年 (Metal Goat); 3789 or 3582
- Coptic calendar: 807–808
- Discordian calendar: 2257
- Ethiopian calendar: 1083–1084
- Hebrew calendar: 4851–4852
- Hindu calendars
- Vikram Samvat: 1147–1148
- Shaka Samvat: 1012–1013
- Kali Yuga: 4191–4192
- Holocene calendar: 11091
- Igbo calendar: 91–92
- Iranian calendar: 469–470
- Islamic calendar: 483–484
- Japanese calendar: Kanji 5 (寛治５年)
- Javanese calendar: 995–996
- Julian calendar: 1091; MXCI
- Korean calendar: 3424
- Minguo calendar: 821 before ROC 民前821年
- Nanakshahi calendar: −377
- Seleucid era: 1402/1403 AG
- Thai solar calendar: 1633–1634
- Tibetan calendar: ལྕགས་ཕོ་རྟ་ལོ་ (male Iron-Horse); 1217 or 836 or 64 — to — ལྕགས་མོ་ལུག་ལོ་ (female Iron-Sheep); 1218 or 837 or 65

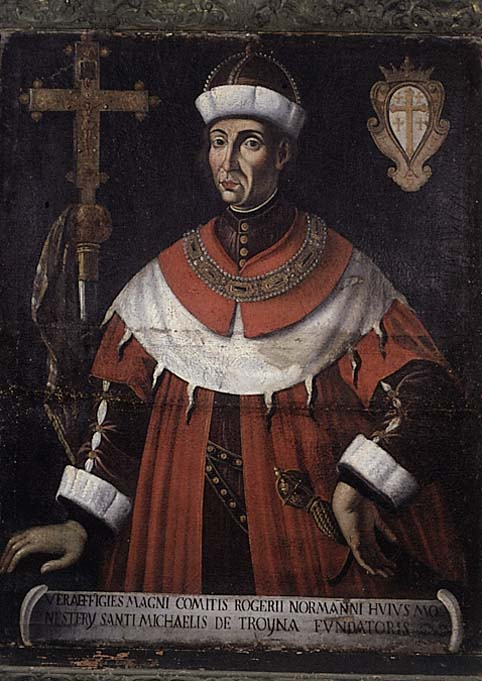
Roger I of Sicily (r. 1071–1101)

Year 1091 (MXCI) was a common year starting on Wednesday of the Julian calendar.

== Events ==
=== By place ===
==== Byzantine Empire ====
- Spring – Tzachas, a Seljuk Turkish military commander, establishes an independent maritime state centred in the Ionian coastal city of Smyrna (modern-day İzmir). He proclaims himself emperor (basileus), and concludes an alliance with the Pechenegs in Thrace. Tzachas uses his fleet to blockade Constantinople by sea, while the Pechenegs besiege the capital by land.
- April 29 – Battle of Levounion: Emperor Alexios I, supported by his allies, defeats 80,000 of Pechenegs (including women and children) at the Evros River, near Enos (modern Turkey). The Cumans and Byzantine forces fall upon the enemy camp, slaughtering all in their path. The Pechenegs are butchered so savagely, that this people is almost wiped out.

==== Europe ====
- Spring – King Stephen II, the last member of the Trpimirović dynasty, dies without leaving an heir after a 2-year reign. War and unrest breaks out in Croatia afterwards. King Ladislaus I of Hungary, on instigation of his sister, Queen Helena, intervenes in the conflict and occupies Croatia. He proclaims himself king, but is contested by the Croatian nobleman Petar Snačić.
- February – Norman conquest of Sicily: The Normans conquer Noto and complete the 30-year-long conquest of Sicily from the Moorish rulers. Duke Roger Borsa (a son of Robert Guiscard) surrenders his share in the castles of Calabria, and receives his inheritance of Palermo. He grants charters to various towns and encourages urban planning in Apulia and Calabria.
- Summer – The Norman invasion of Malta: A Norman fleet led by Count Roger I of Sicily ("Bosso") arrives in Malta. Roger disembarks his army, and besieges the island's capital Medina (modern-day Mdina). The inhabitants negotiate peace terms (by promising to pay an annual tribute) and swear an oath of loyalty to Roger. On the way back, the Normans sack the island Gozo.
- July – The Abbadid dynasty ruling in Al-Andalus (modern Spain) falls when Almoravid forces storm Seville. Confronted with this threat, Emir Muhammad ibn Abu Bakr Muhammad al-Aftas of Badajoz obtains the support of King Alfonso VI ("the Brave") of Castile, in exchange for the Moorish positions on the river Tagus (Sintra, Santarém and Lisbon).

==== Britain and France ====
- February 2 – King William II of England invades western Normandy with a large army. His brothers, Henry and Robert Curthose, mobilize mercenary forces to resist him during a siege at Mont-Saint-Michel. Under terms of the Treaty of Caen, estates on the Cotentin Peninsula of Normandy are surrendered to William, matters being concluded in August.
- July – King Malcolm III of Scotland invades England, reaching as far south as Durham. The Normans led by William II and Robert march north to oppose the Scots, but a conflict is averted. Malcolm is forced to accept the terms of the Treaty of Abernethy (1072) and pays homage to William.
- Cardiff Castle in Wales is constructed by Robert Fitzhamon, Norman lord of Gloucester (approximate date).

=== By topic ===
==== Disasters ====
- October 17 – London tornado: A T8 tornado (roughly equal to an F4 on the Fujita scale) occurs in London. The wooden London Bridge is demolished and the church of St. Mary-le-Bow is badly damaged.

==== Religion ====
- December – Athanasius VI bar Khamoro becomes (against his will) patriarch and head of the Syriac Orthodox Church in Antioch (until 1129).

== Births ==
- September 18 – Andronikos Komnenos, Byzantine prince and general
- December 22 – Jutta von Sponheim, German abbess (d. 1136)
- Hongzhi Zhengjue, Chinese Chan Buddhist monk and writer (d. 1157)
- Matilda of Rethel, French noblewoman and sovereign (d. 1151)
- Tiantong Zongjue, Chinese Buddhist monk and patriarch (d. 1162)

== Deaths ==
- March 26 – Wallada bint al-Mustakfi, Andalusian female poet (b. 994)
- June 17 – Dirk V, count of Friesland (west of the Vlie) (b. 1052)
- June 29 – Frederick of Montbéliard, margrave of Turin
- July 5 – William of Hirsau, German abbot and music theorist
- August 8 – Altmann of Passau, German bishop and saint
- August 25 – Sisnando Davides, Mozarab military leader
- December 19
  - Adelaide of Susa, margravine of Turin
  - Fujiwara no Tadaie, Japanese statesman (b. 1033)
- Fu Yaoyu, Chinese government official and politician (b. 1024)
- Helena of Hungary, queen consort of Croatia (approximate date)
- Jordan I (or Giordano), Italo-Norman prince of Capua
- Mac meic Aedh Ua Flaithbheartaigh, Irish king of Iar Connacht
- Robert D'Oyly, Norman nobleman (approximate date)
- Stephen II (or Stjepan), king of Croatia (approximate date)
- Wolfhelm of Brauweiler, German Benedictine abbot
- Artuk Bey (Zaheer-ul-Daulah Artuk Beg), Seljuk general and governor
