= 1129 =

1129 in various calendars
- Gregorian calendar: 1129; MCXXIX
- Ab urbe condita: 1882
- Armenian calendar: 578; ԹՎ ՇՀԸ
- Assyrian calendar: 5879
- Balinese saka calendar: 1050–1051
- Bengali calendar: 535–536
- Berber calendar: 2079
- English Regnal year: 29 Hen. 1 – 30 Hen. 1
- Buddhist calendar: 1673
- Burmese calendar: 491
- Byzantine calendar: 6637–6638
- Chinese calendar: 戊申年 (Earth Monkey); 3826 or 3619 — to — 己酉年 (Earth Rooster); 3827 or 3620
- Coptic calendar: 845–846
- Discordian calendar: 2295
- Ethiopian calendar: 1121–1122
- Hebrew calendar: 4889–4890
- Hindu calendars
- Vikram Samvat: 1185–1186
- Shaka Samvat: 1050–1051
- Kali Yuga: 4229–4230
- Holocene calendar: 11129
- Igbo calendar: 129–130
- Iranian calendar: 507–508
- Islamic calendar: 523–524
- Japanese calendar: Daiji 4 (大治４年)
- Javanese calendar: 1034–1035
- Julian calendar: 1129; MCXXIX
- Korean calendar: 3462
- Minguo calendar: 783 before ROC 民前783年
- Nanakshahi calendar: −339
- Seleucid era: 1440/1441 AG
- Thai solar calendar: 1671–1672
- Tibetan calendar: ས་ཕོ་སྤྲེ་ལོ་ (male Earth-Monkey); 1255 or 874 or 102 — to — ས་མོ་བྱ་ལོ་ (female Earth-Bird); 1256 or 875 or 103

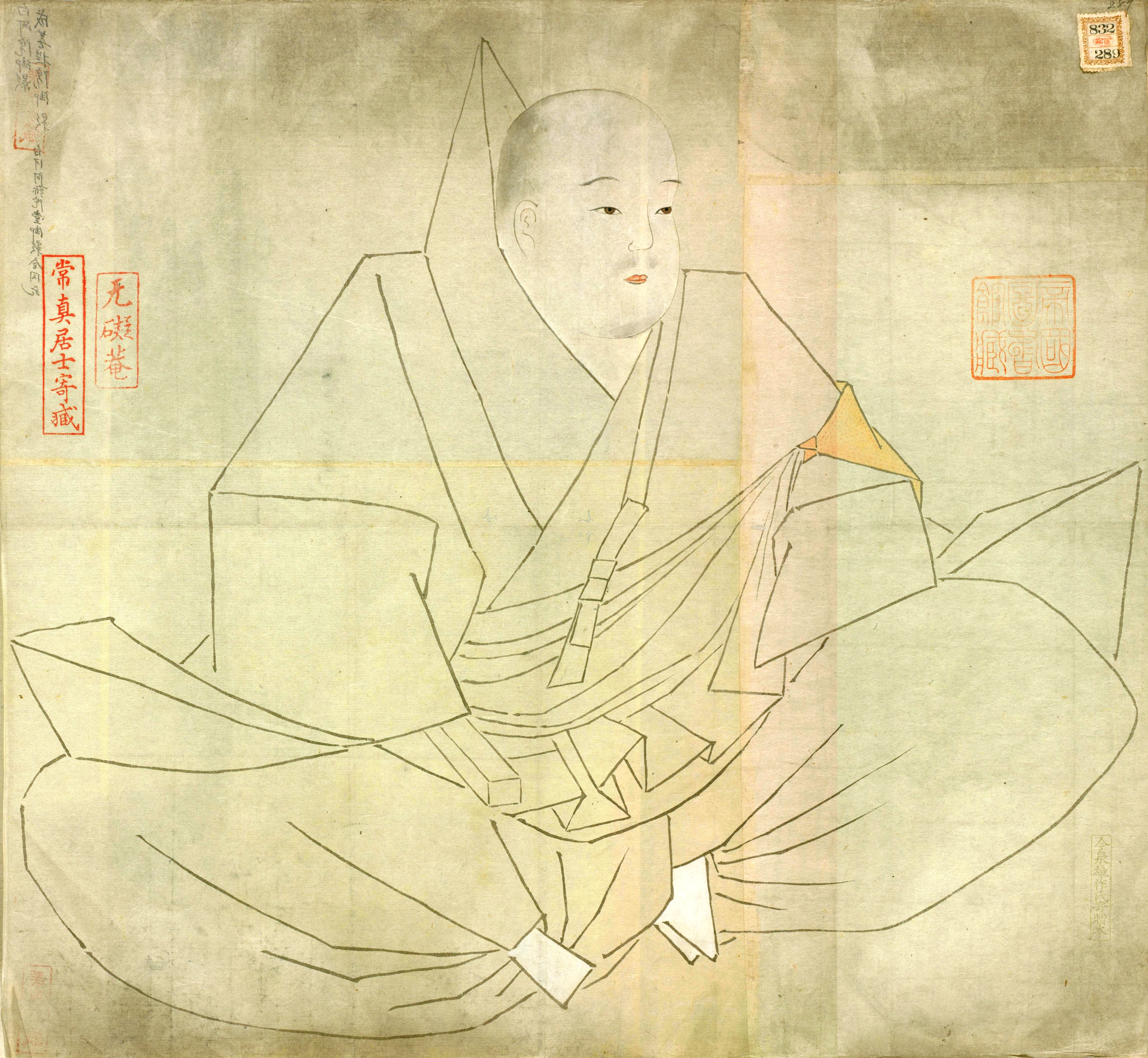
Emperor Shirakawa (1073–1087)

Year 1129 (MCXXIX) was a common year starting on Tuesday of the Julian calendar.

== Events ==
=== By place ===
==== Europe ====
- April 14 – Following the Capetian tradition, King Louis VI (the Fat) has his eldest son Philip crowned as co-ruler of France at Rheims Cathedral. Louis himself becomes the national protector of all France.
- June 2 – Fulk V, count of Anjou, marries Melisende (daughter of King Baldwin II) the heir to the Kingdom of Jerusalem. Fulk gives up his title which passes to his 15-year-old son, Geoffrey V (the Fair).
- September – Roger II of Sicily gains recognition as duke at Melfi from the Norman nobles of Naples, Bari, Capua, Salerno and other cities that have resisted him.
- Burgsteinfurt Castle is built in what is now Steinfurt (modern Germany).

==== Asia ====
- Jin–Song War: Emperor Gao Zong of the Song dynasty moves the capital from Yangzhou to Hangzhou, after the Jurchen Jin dynasty captures Kaifeng in the Jingkang Incident.
- March 26 – Gao Zong abdicates the throne after a mutiny of the palace guard. His 2-year-old son Zhao Fu succeeds him, but Empress Meng becomes regent and the sole ruler.
- April 20 – Gao Zong regains the throne (with the support of the imperial army led by General Han Shizhong). Zhao Fu is forced to abdicate with Meng having ruled for 25 days.
- July 24 – Former Emperor Shirakawa dies at his native Kyoto. His son Toba begins his cloistered rule, sharing power with Sutoku, a grandson of Shirakawa.

=== By topic ===
==== Religion ====
- January 23 – Henry of Blois becomes bishop of Winchester after the death of William Giffard (who was also Lord Chancellor to King Henry I) in England.

== Births ==
- Abu al-Abbas as-Sabti, Moroccan Sufi writer (d. 1204)
- Date Tomomune, Japanese nobleman and samurai (d. 1199)
- Elisabeth of Schönau, German Benedictine abbess (d. 1164)
- Henry the Lion, duke of Saxony and Bavaria (d. 1195)
- Theophanes Kerameus, bishop of Rossano (d. 1152)

== Deaths ==
- January 23 – William Giffard, bishop of Winchester
- January 27 – Ranulf le Meschin, 3rd Earl of Chester (b. 1070)
- January 29 – Minamoto no Shunrai, Japanese poet (b. 1055)
- February 16 – Thoros I, Armenian prince (or 1130)
- February 17 – Constantine II, Armenian prince
- July 24 – Shirakawa, emperor of Japan (b. 1053)
- July 28 – Zhao Fu, emperor of the Song dynasty (b. 1127)
- November 21 – Nigel d'Aubigny, Norman nobleman
- December 30 – Roger of Cannae, Italian bishop (b. 1060)
- Athanasius VI bar Khamoro, patriarch of Antioch
- Cellach of Armagh (or Celsus), Irish archbishop (b. 1080)
- Fujiwara no Akinaka, Japanese nobleman (b. 1059)
- John Theristus, Italian Benedictine monk (b. 1049)
- Ramiro Sánchez, Spanish nobleman (or 1130)
- Richard Fitz Pons, Norman nobleman (b. 1080)
- Walter FitzRoger, Norman sheriff of Gloucester
- Zhao Mingcheng, Chinese politician (b. 1081)
