= Áed Ua Forréid =

Irish Catholic bishop

Áed Ua Forréid was Bishop of Armagh from 1032 to 1056. He was from the Cenél Tigernaig branch of the northern Uí Néill kin-group of Cenél nÉogain. The see was not elevated to an archbishopric until 1106, well after his death.

A praise-poem in his honour, written sometime after his election and before 1042, exists in a single copy transcribed in 1628 by Mícheál Ó Cléirigh (Dublin, Royal Irish Academy MS B.IV.2 (1080), fol. 142^{r}).

He may have resigned the bishopric when he became fer léigind (i.e. Lector) in 1049. In the Annals of Ulster, which derive from an Armagh chronicle, in their prose notice of his death at 75 years of age, he is only "eminent lector of Armagh" (ard-fer leiginn Aird Macha). However, a verse cited in the same entry also describes him as "gentle bishop".
