= Rodulf (missionary bishop in Norway) =

Rodulf was a Roman Catholic bishop and Norman kinsman of Edward the Confessor. After working as a missionary for Olaf II of Norway in Norway and maybe Iceland, he was appointed by Edward as an Abbot of Abingdon in 1051 but died in 1052 (Kelly 2000).
