= Halinard =

11th-century Bishop of Lyon and diplomat

Halinard was the Archbishop of Lyon between 1046 and 1052; he also served as abbot of the monastery of Saint-Bénigne in Dijon between 1031 and 1052. He was a counselor of both the Emperor Henry III and Pope Victor II.

He was born in Burgundy of noble parents. His father, Warnerius, came from Langres and his mother, Istiburgis, from Autun. Halinard was raised by his godfather Walter, who was the Bishop of Autun. Bishop Bruno the Bishop of Langres enrolled him into the college of canons, to train for ordination. Against the wishes of his parents, Halinard indicated that he wished to become a monk. He fled, but was pursued by his parents and removed from his monastery, Saint-Bénigne de Dijon in the diocese of Langres, with the permission of the bishop of Langres. He escaped a second time, and was brought back by the bishop, who made vigorous attempts to dissuade Halinard from his intention. Finally he was allowed to join the monastery of Benedictines in Dijon, under the leadership of Abbot William (1012-1030)

== Monk and abbot ==
He served in all the monastery jobs, rising to become the Provost of the entire monastery, a position he held for four years (c. 1026—1030). As abbot of the monastery of Saint-Bénigne in Dijon, he was compelled to write to Pope John XIX (1024—1032) to seek papal protection against the Canons of the cathedral of Dijon, who wished to bury their deceased members in the cemetery of the monks of Saint-Bénigne.

On 12 July 1046, Archbishop Odolric of Lyon died of poison. At the previous vacancy in 1041, Abbot Halinard was recommended to King Henry III as his successor, but Halinard refused, and suggested instead Odolric, the Archdeacon of Langres. In the summer of 1046, the name of Halinard was again brought to the king as a candidate to succeed Odolric as archbishop.

== Archbishop of Lyon ==
After lengthy negotiations with King Henry III, in 1046 Halinard was consecrated bishop by Hugues, Archbishop of Besançon. The place of consecration is given by the "Chronique de Saint-Benigne", p. 190, as 'in loco qui vocatur Herbrestinc lingua Teutonica', perhaps Herbrechtingen.

On 23 and 24 December 1046, Archbishop Halinard was present in Rome at the synod, called by the Emperor Henry III to depose the three claimants to the papal throne, and to elect a single pope to fill the ensuing vacancy. The successful candidate, nominated by the emperor, was Bishop Suidger of Bamberg, who became Pope Clement II.

After the death of Pope Clement II on 9 October 1047, the people of Rome sent legates to the emperor, with instructions to nominate Halinard for the papacy. He was admired by the Romans for his easy discourse and good-natured conversation; spoke fluently with an Italian accent. But Halimard, knowing their dispositions, avoided going to court until, as time passed, the emperor settled on Bishop Poppo of Brixen (Damasus II) as his nomination. It took time, trouble, and threats to get the Duke of Spoleto and the Romans to enthrone Damasus, against the opposition of the deposed pope, Benedict IX. Damasus was enthroned on 17 July 1048, but died three weeks later, on 9 August.

On 12 February 1049, the day of his consecration, Pope Victor II issued a summons to Archbishop Halimard and all the bishops of Gaul to attend a synod at Rome. The synod took place from 9—15 April 1049. The archbishop of Trier was declared the primate of Gallia Belgica. Pope Victor then travelled to Germany and France, arriving in Reims on 29 September 1049. On 2 October, he consecrated the church of Saint Remi, with the assistance of Archbishop Halinard and Archbishop Everhard of Trier. On 3 October, a synod began in the church of Saint Remi, which lasted until 6 October; the bishops present, including Halimard, were required to purge themselves of the possible taint of simony. The pope returned to Italy, and was at Verona in time for Christmas, and announced that he intended to hold a synod in Rome and one in Vercelli in 1050.

In the first half of May 1050, Archbishop Halimard took part in the Roman synod of Pope Victor II in which the doctrines of Berengarius were condemned and the heresiarch himself was excommunicated. It is possible that he accompanied the pope to France, and took part in the synod of Vercelli in September 1050. He certainly took part in the ceremonies of the transfer of the remains of the new saint, Gerard of Toul, and the dedication of his altar, on 21 and 22 October 1050.

In spring 1052, he travelled with Pope Leo IX to Montecassino, Capua, Benevento, and Salerno.

== Death and burial ==
Returning to Rome, he took up residence at the Benedictine monastery of S. Gregorio Magno on the Coelian Hill, while the pope proceeded north to Pavia and then to Ratisbon to meet with the emperor Henry III. Halinard died in Rome, on 29 July 1052, poisoned along with two monks and several other persons by one of his enemies. He was buried in the Basilica of S. Paul outside-the-walls, which was staffed by Benedictine monks.

He left his chapel ornaments, other valuable objects, and a considerable sum of money to his abbey of Saint-Bénigne in Dijon. In a letter, he had recommended to his Canons at Lyons that, in choosing his successor, they should not look around at other churches for a suitable person, but instead to pray to God to give them a worthy pastor from among themselves. He actually recommended the Provost, Humbert, who did become archbishop eventually, but not until 1064.

== Bibliography ==
- Chomton, Louis (1900). Histoire de l'église Saint-Bénigne de Dijon. Dijon: Jobard. pp. 129–136.
- Fisquet, Honore (1864). La France pontificale (Gallia Christiana): Metropole de Lyon et Vienne: Lyon (in French). Paris: Etienne Repos. pp. 171–175.
- Martin, Jean-Baptiste (1905). Conciles et bullaire du diocèse de Lyon: des origines à la réunion du Lyonnais à la France en 1312 (in French). Lyon: Vitte. pp. 65–72.
