= Alger of Liège =

French priest (1055–1131)

Alger of Liège (1055–1131), known also as Alger of Cluny and Algerus Magister, was a learned clergyman and canonist from Liège, author of several notable works.

Alger was first deacon and scholaster of church of St Bartholomew in his native Liège and was then appointed (c. 1100) as a canon in St. Lambert's Cathedral. Moreover, he acted as the personal secretary of bishop Otbert from 1103. He declined offers from German bishops and finally retired to the monastery of Cluny after 1121, where he died at a high age, leaving behind a solid reputation for piety and intelligence.

He played a leading role in the trial of Rupert of Deutz in 1116.

His History of the Church of Liège, and many of his other works, are lost. The most important remaining are:

1. De Misericordia et Justitia (On Mercy and Justice), a collection of biblical extracts and sayings of Church Fathers with commentary (an important work for the history of church law and discipline), which is to be found in the Anecdota of Martène, vol. v. This work has been suggested as influential on Gratian's Decretum
2. De Sacramentis Corporis et Sanguinis Domini; a treatise, in three books, against the Berengarian heresy, highly commended by Peter of Cluny and Erasmus, who published it in 1530. In this book, Alger also took on Rupert of Deutz' views on the Eucharist and predestination.
3. De Gratia et Libero Arbitrio; given in Bernard Pez's Anecdota, vol. iv.
4. De Sacrificio Missae; given in the Collectio Scriptor. Vet. of Angelo Mai, vol. ix. p. 371.
5. De dignitate ecclesie Leodiensis, which established the reciprocal obligations of the primary and secondary churches; inserted in the Liber officiorum ecclesie Leodiensis (1323).

A biography was written by Nicholas of Liège: De Algero veterum testimonia.
