= Battle of Varaville =

Medieval battle

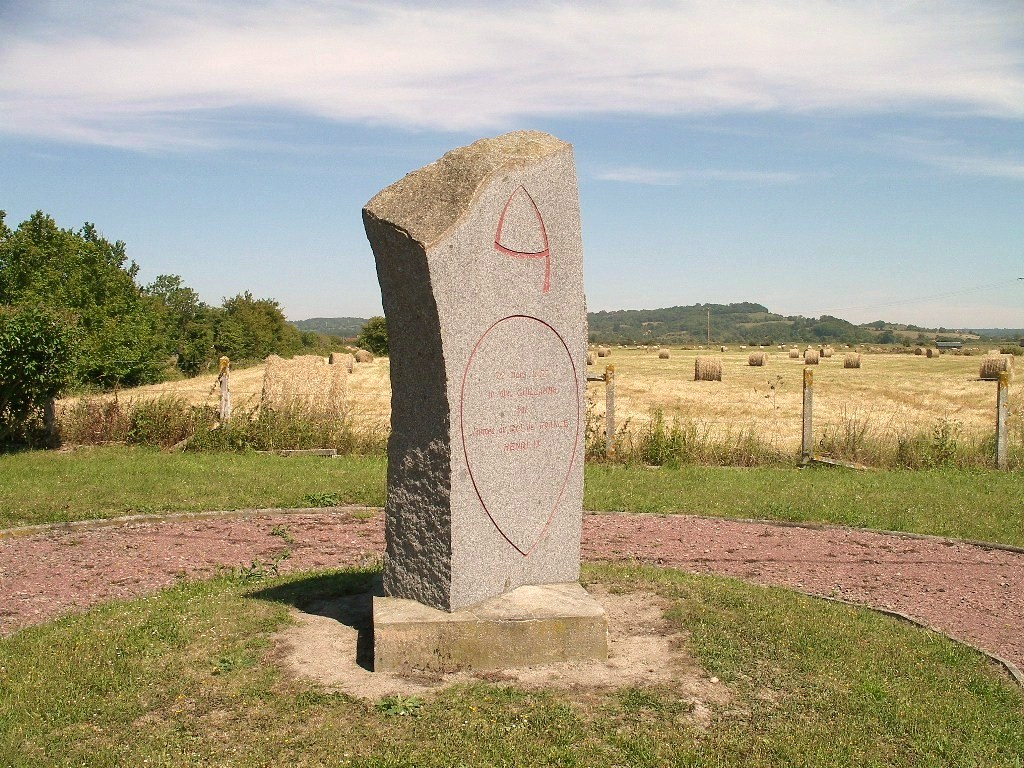
- Monument to the battle
Date	August 1057
Location	Near Varaville, Normandy
Result	Norman victory

Belligerents
Duchy of Normandy	Kingdom of France; County of Anjou

Commanders and leaders
William, Duke of Normandy	King Henry I of France; Geoffrey Martel, Count of Anjou

The Battle of Varaville was fought in 1057 by William, Duke of Normandy, against King Henry I of France and Count Geoffrey Martel of Anjou.

In August 1057, King Henry and Count Geoffrey invaded Normandy on a campaign that was aimed at Bayeux and Caen. The size of their army and its composition are unknown. They first arrived in the Hiemois region of Normandy and began raiding and pillaging towards the two towns. Duke William, who appears to have been reluctant to oppose his overlord directly, gathered a large army at Falaise but took no other action besides keeping scouts out to report the invading force's movements. When the invaders reached a ford on the estuary of the river Dives near Varaville, they began to cross but when the tide came in, the process had only been half completed, leaving the army split in two. William seized the opportunity and attacked the half of the invading army that had not yet crossed. Later reports by chroniclers made the battle into a massacre, but contemporary writers barely noticed it. Modern historians have praised William's generalship during the battle, with David Bates noting the battle as an example of William's habit of surprising his enemies with unexpected moves.

The main effect was that the invaders retreated quickly from Normandy. The battle also marked the end of the last invasion of Normandy during Duke William's lifetime. After the retreat of Henry and Geoffrey, William was able to extend his influence outside his Norman lands, increasing his power in Maine in the years 1057 through 1060. Other results included Bishop Ivo of Sees switching from an Angevin to a Norman alliance.

In the next year, 1058, William invaded King Henry's lands and recaptured the castle at Tillières, which had been lost to the Normans during William's minority.
