= Íñigo of Oña =

Aragonese abbot and saint (d. 1057)

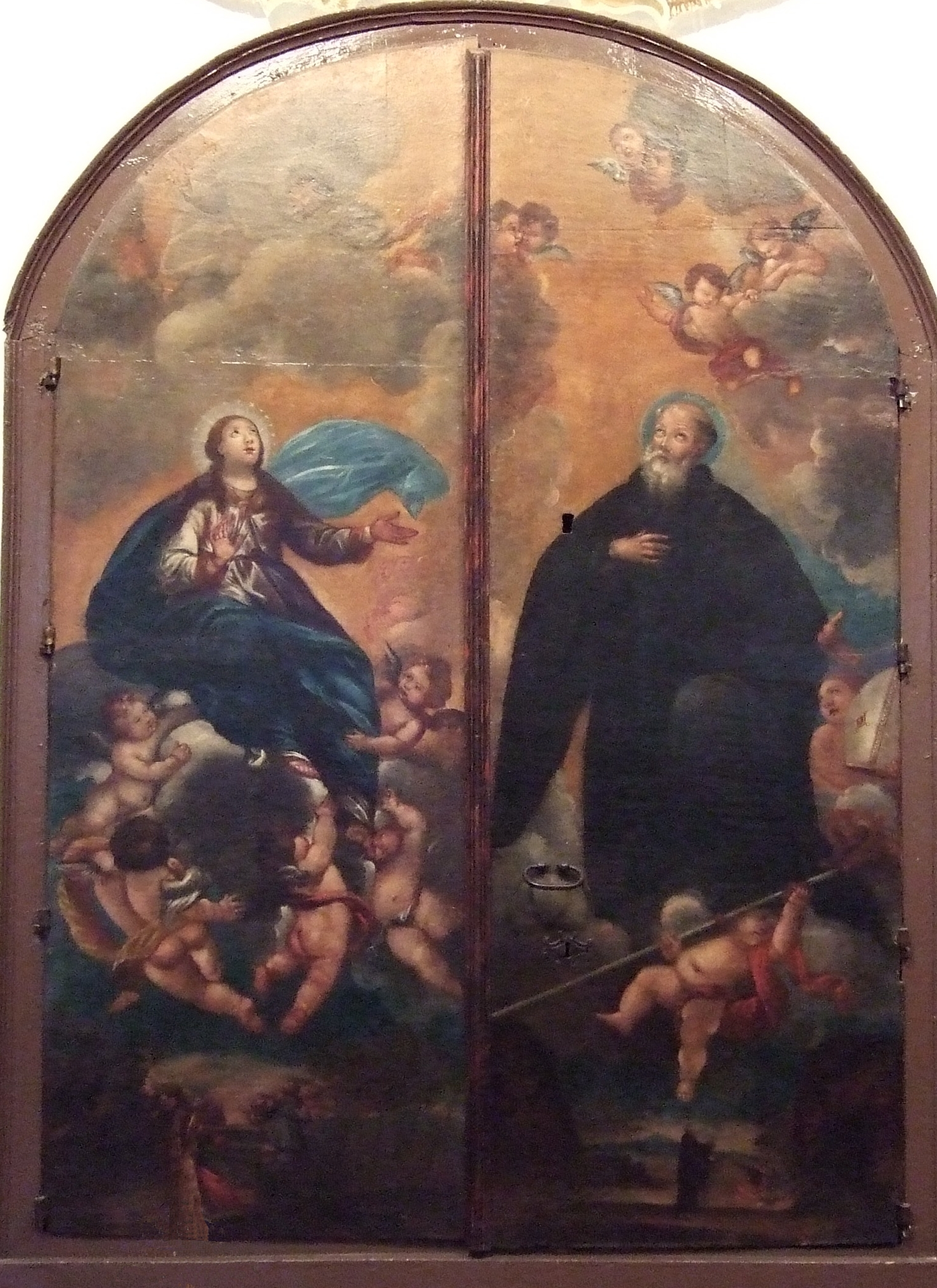
Assumption of the Virgin Mary and Saint Íñigo by Francisco de Goya y Lucientes

Íñigo of Oña (Note: Basque: Eneko, Latin: Enecus, Ennecus, Innicus, Spanish: San Enecón, San Íñigo.) (died 1 June 1057) was the Benedictine abbot of San Salvador at Oña. He was canonised in 1259 by Pope Alexander IV and is venerated in the Roman Catholic Church, where his feast day is 1 June. His feast day is also celebrated on 1 June in the Eastern Orthodox Church. He is the patron saint of Calatayud, his birthplace. Ignatius of Loyola was named after him.

He was a hermit before coming out of his hermitage in the mountains to reform the monasteries at the behest of King Sancho III of Pamplona. He maintained close ties with his fellow priests but was well-known also to Jews and Muslims.

During his abbacy, his abbey was granted jurisdiction over San Juan de Pancorvo in 1046 and San Juan, Santa María, y San Martín de Alfania in 1048 by García V of Navarre, in whose territory Oña lay at the time. On 12 December 1052, Íñigo assisted at the consecration of García's new monastic foundation of Santa María la Real at Nájera. Along with Dominic of Silos, he also intervened to try to prevent the fraternal conflict that ended in the Battle of Atapuerca (1 September 1054), at which García died. Íñigo died at Oña a few years later.

Pope Alexander III allowed people in Tours to celebrate Íñigo on his death date in 1163, although the abbot had not been beatified or canonized at that stage. His holiness seemed so obvious to all that even the Jews and Muslims are said to have mourned his death. Alexander III allowed in 1170 for his remains to be relocated to the high altar of the place where he was interred.

Alexander IV granted an indulgence in 1258 to those who visited his tomb. His canonization was celebrated under Alexander IV on 18 June 1259. His liturgical feast is affixed to the date of his death, as is the norm. Pope Gregory XIII issued another indulgence to people who did the same later in 1575. King Philip V prevailed upon Pope Clement XII to include the late monk's feast in the Roman calendar on 13 March 1736.

== Sources ==
- Ángel Canellas López. 1979. "García Sánchez de Nájera, Rey de Pamplona (1035–1054)." Cuadernos de investigación: Geografía e historia, 5(2):135–156.
