= Cormac Ua Ruadhrach =

Irish priest

Cormac Ua Ruadhrachh (d 1053) was an Irish priest in the eleventh century: the only recorded Archdeacon of Fore.

His death is listed in the Annals of the Four Masters.
