= Conrad II of Bavaria =

Duke of Bavaria
- Reign: 1054 – 1055
- Predecessor: Henry VIII
- Successor: Henry VIII
- Born: September/October 1052
- Died: 10 April 1055 (aged 2 years, 6/7 months)
- Father: Henry III, Holy Roman Emperor
- Mother: Agnes of Poitou

Conrad II (September or October 1052, in Regensburg – 10 April 1055, in Regensburg), called the Child, was the duke of Bavaria from 1054 to 1055. He was the second son of the Emperor Henry III and his second wife, Agnes of Poitou. He was briefly appointed duke of Bavaria, which had been held by his elder brother Henry. He died soon after and was replaced by Henry.

If Conrad I is not numbered (because of his alternative name Cuno), Conrad the Child is sometimes numbered Conrad I.

Conrad II of Bavaria Salian dynasty Born: 1052 Died: 1055
German royalty
Preceded by Henry VIII	Duke of Bavaria; 1054–1055	Succeeded by Henry VIII
