= Fujiwara no Akinaka =

Fujiwara no Akinaka (藤原 顕仲; 1059–1129) was a Japanese nobleman and waka poet of the Heian period.

== Life ==
Fujiwara no Akinaka was born in Kōhei 2 (1059 in the Gregorian calendar). He was the third son of Sukenaka (ja), a member of the Saneyori lineage (実頼流) of the Northern Branch of the Fujiwara clan. He was later adopted by Fujiwara no Motoie (died 1093), the governor of Mutsu Province. His mother was a daughter of Minamoto no Tsuneyori.

He is known as Suke Akinaka (佐顕仲) to distinguish him from Minamoto no Akinaka. He had various other names, such as Katsumata no Hyōe no Suke (勝間田兵衛佐), by which name the Fukuro-zōshi calls him. The latter name is a derived from a combination of his court position, Sahyōe-no-suke, and a famous poem he composed at the Shirakawa-den Gyokai (白河殿御会) on Katsumata Pond (勝間田池 Katsumata-no-ike):

Japanese text	Romanized Japanese	English translation
勝間田の 池も緑に 見ゆるかな 岸の柳の 色にうつりて	Katsumata no ike mo midori ni miyuru kana kishi no yanagi no iro ni utsurite

He was close friends with Minamoto no Toshiyori and Fujiwara no Mototoshi, and in addition to being a respected poet he was also known for his skill as a calligrapher and musician, but was unable to attain success due to his relatively low birth. By the end of his career, he had risen to the Junior Fourth Rank, Lower Grade. He held the position of Assistant Head of Left Military Guards (左兵衛佐 sahyōe-no-suke).

According to the Chūyūki, Akinaka died on the third day of the first month of Daiji 4 (31 January 1129). He was 71 (by Japanese reckoning).

== Poetry ==
The first uta-awase contest in which he took part was the Sakon no Gon-Chūjō Toshitada Ason-ke Uta-awase (左近権中将俊忠朝臣家歌合) in Chōji 1 (1104). He took part in the following poetic gatherings:

- the Ungo-ji Kechien-kyō Goen Uta-awase (雲居寺結縁経後宴歌合) in Eikyū 4 (1116);
- the Hitomaro-eigu held by Fujiwara no Akisue in Gen'ei 1 (1118); and
- the Naidaijin-ke Uta-awase (内大臣家歌合) that was held over three sessions between Gen'ei 1 and Gen'ei 2 (1119).

He was one of the poets of the Horikawa-in Ontoki Hyakushu Waka (堀河院御時百首和歌).

According to the Yakumo Mishō, he was disappointed with the Kin'yōshū, and in Daiji 1 (1126) compiled his own anthology, the Ryōgyokushū (良玉集), which is no longer extant.

18 of his poems were included in imperial anthologies from the Kin'yōshū on.

One famous poem of his, in which he laments his lack of success at court, is the following from the first book of miscellaneous poems in the Kin'yōshū:

Japanese text	Romanized Japanese	English translation
年ふれど 春に知られぬ 埋木は 花の都に 住むかひぞなき	toshi furedo haru ni shirarenu mumoregi wa hana no miyako ni sumu kai zo naki
