= Fujiwara no Nakazane =

Fujiwara no Nakazane (藤原 仲実; 1057–1118) was a Japanese nobleman and waka poet of the late Heian period.

== Life ==
Fujiwara no Nakazane was born in 1057. His father was Yoshinari (能成), the Junior Fifth Rank, Lower Grade governor of Echizen Province, and his mother was a daughter of Minamoto no Norinari (源則成の女). His paternal grandfather was Fujiwara no Noritada, the Controller of the Left (左大弁 sadaiben) and Tutor (侍読 jidoku) to the emperor.

In his late 20s, he served as Emperor Shirakawa's rokui-kurōdo, and was granted court rank (joshaku) in Ōtoku 2 (1085 in the Julian calendar) at the age of 29, by Japanese reckoning. At the height of his career, he held the positions of governor of Echizen, Palace Assistant (中宮亮 chūgū-no-suke) and the Senior Fourth Rank, Lower Grade. He left service in the palace to serve under Yōmeimon-in, becoming governor of Ki Province and governor of Mikawa Province.

According to the Chūyūki, he died on the 26th day of the third month of Eikyū 6 (18 April 1118). He was 62 years old, by Japanese reckoning.

== Poetry ==
Nakazane began his poetic career when, at 26, he took part in the Dewa-no-kami Tsunenaka-ke uta-awase (出羽守経仲家歌合, "Uta-awase contest at the home of Tsunenaka, the governor of Dewa Province"). He served under Retired Emperor Horikawa, and took part in the latter's poetic circles, participating in both the Horikawa-in Hyakushu (堀河院百首) and Eikyū Hyakushu (永久百首) and frequently showing up in poetic gatherings such as utakai and uta-awase.

At the Horikawa-in Hyakushu he was second only to Minamoto no Toshiyori in his use of unusual language, and is considered to be second to Toshiyori among the "new-style" poets of the period. His poetry was included in imperial collections from the Kin'yō Wakashū on,

Nakazane wrote Kigoshō (綺語抄), a work of poetic theory, and the Kokin Wakashū Mokuroku (古今和歌集目録).
