= Archdeacon of Drumcliffe =

Medieval clergy position

The Archdeacon of Drumcliffe was a senior ecclesiastical officer within the Diocese of Drumcliffe. They held office between the 10th and the 13th centuries.
