= 1000s (decade) =

Decade

The 1000s (pronounced "one-thousands") was a decade of the Julian Calendar which began on January 1, 1000, and ended on December 31, 1009.

== Events ==
=== Japan ===
- Palace Scandal: Princess Consort Yasuko has an affair. Michinaga (her half-brother) investigates it secretly and finds out the truth about her pregnancy. Yasuko cries and repents. Yasuko leaves the palace under the patronage of Empress Dowager Senshi and Michinaga (moved to his residence).
- Murasaki Shikibu starts to write The Tale of Genji.
- Ichimonjiya Wasuke, the oldest surviving wagashi store, is established as a teahouse adjacent to Imamiya Shrine.
- January 10: Death of Empress Dowager Masako (empress consort of the late Emperor Reizei)
- April 8: Fujiwara no Shoshi is promoted to Empress (Chugu), while there is another empress, Fujiwara no Teishi (kogo) - this is the first time that there are two empresses

=== Americas ===
- The Taíno have become the dominant culture of modern day Puerto Rico.

=== Christendom ===
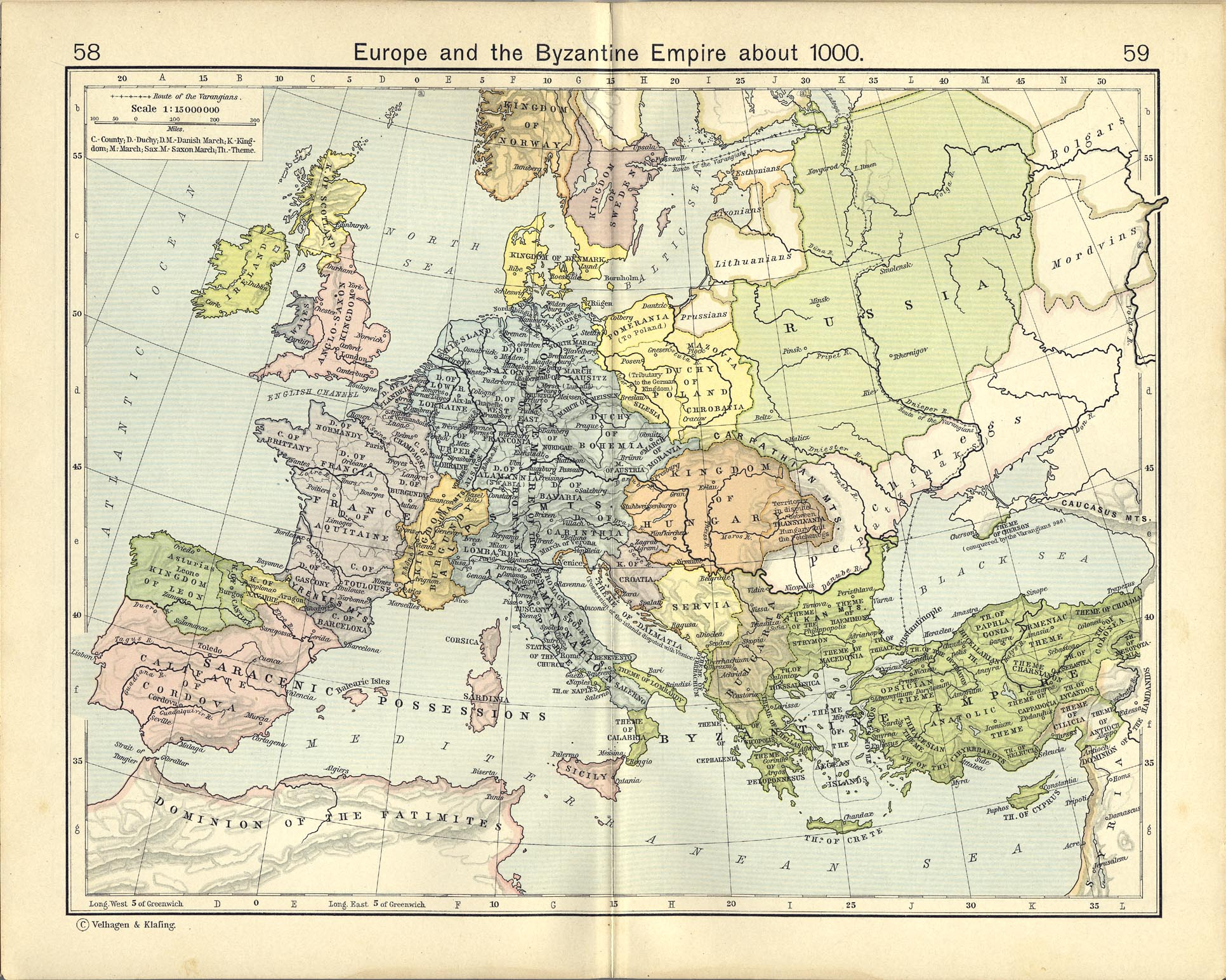
Western Europe, the Holy Roman Empire, Kievan Russia, and the Byzantine Empire in the Middle Ages (year 1000)

- In continental Europe, the Holy Roman Empire established itself as the most powerful state. The Holy Roman Emperor Otto III made a pilgrimage from Rome to Aachen and Gniezno (Gnesen), stopping at Regensburg, Meissen, Magdeburg, and Gniezno. The Congress of Gniezno (with Bolesław I the Brave) was part of his pilgrimage. In Rome, he built the basilica of San Bartolomeo all'Isola, to host the relics of St. Bartholomew.
- In the Kingdom of France, Robert II, the son of Hugh Capet, was the first King of the Capetian royal dynasty.
- The Byzantine Empire under the Macedonian dynasty was engaged in a long and hard war with the First Bulgarian Empire. The Byzantine generals, Theodorokanos and Nikephoros Xiphias captured the former Bulgarian capitals of Pliska and Great Preslav, along with Little Preslav, extending Byzantine control over the northeastern portion of the Bulgarian state (Mysia and Scythia Minor). At the same time, Byzantium was instrumental in the Christianization of Kievan Rus' and of other medieval confederations of Slavic states.
- In Great Britain, a unified Kingdom of England had developed out of the various Anglo-Saxon kingdoms.
- In Scandinavia, Christianization was in its early stages, with the Althing of the Icelandic Commonwealth embracing Christianity in the year 1000. On September 9, the King of Norway, Olaf Tryggvason, was defeated by the Scandinavian kingdoms of Denmark and Sweden in the Battle of Svolder. Sweyn Forkbeard established Danish control over part of Norway. The city of Oslo was founded in Norway (the exact year is debatable, but the 1,000 year anniversary was held in the year 2000). It is known that in or around this year, Norse explorer Leif Erikson became the first European to land in the Americas, at L'Anse aux Meadows in modern-day Newfoundland.
- The papacy during this time was in a period of decline, in retrospect known as the saeculum obscurum ("Dark Age") or "pornocracy" ("rule of harlots"), a state of affairs that would result in the Great Schism between Roman Catholicism and Eastern Orthodoxy later in the 11th century.
- The Kingdom of Hungary was established in 1000 as a Christian state. In the next centuries, the Kingdom of Hungary became the pre-eminent cultural power in the Central European region. On December 25, Stephen I was crowned as the first King of Hungary in Esztergom.
- Sancho III of Pamplona became King of Aragon and Navarre. The Reconquista was gaining some ground, but the southern Iberian peninsula would still be dominated by Islam for centuries to come; Córdoba was the world's largest city at this time, with 450,000 inhabitants.
- In the Kingdom of Croatia the army of the Republic of Venice led by Doge Pietro II Orseolo conquered the island of Lastovo.
- The Château de Goulaine vineyard was founded in France.
- The archdiocese in Gniezno was founded; the first archbishop was Radim Gaudentius, from Slavník dynasty, and dioceses in Kołobrzeg, Kraków and Wrocław.
- The Bell foundry was founded in Italy by Pontificia Fonderia Marinelli.

=== Islamic world ===
The Muslim world was in its Golden Age; still organised in caliphates, it continued to be dominated by the Abbasid Caliphate, with the Caliphate of Córdoba to the west, the Fatimid Caliphate in North Africa, and experienced ongoing campaigns in Africa and in India. At the time, Persia was in a period of instability, with various polities seceding from Abbasid rule, among whom the Ghaznavids would emerge as the most powerful.

The Islamic world was reaching the peak of its historical scientific achievements. Important scholars and scientists who flourished in AD 1000 include Al-Zahrawi (Abcasis), Ibn Yunus (publishes his astronomical treatise Al-Zij al-Hakimi al-Kabir in Cairo in c. 1000), Abu Sahl al-Quhi (Kuhi), Abu-Mahmud Khujandi, Abu Nasr Mansur, Abu al-Wafa' al-Buzjani, Ahmad ibn Fadlan, Ali Ibn Isa, Al-Karaji (al-Karkhi), Ibn al-Haytham (Book of Optics), Avicenna, Averroes, and Al-Biruni.

By this time, the Turkic migration from the Eurasian Steppe had reached Eastern Europe, and most of the Turkic tribes (Khazars, Bulgars, Pechenegs etc.) had been Islamized.

=== Babylon abandoned ===
Babylon was abandoned around this year.

=== By place ===
==== Africa ====
- Khazrun ben Falful, from the Maghrawa family Banu Khazrun, begins ruling Tripoli, on the African continent.

==== Asia ====
- March 17 – The Buddhist ruler of Butuan, in the Philippines (P’u-tuan in the Sung Dynasty records), Sari Bata Shaja, makes the first tributary mission to China.
- The Tao/Tayk region is annexed by the Byzantines, as the Theme of Iberia.
- Mahmud of Ghazni, Muslim leader of Ghazni, begins a series of raids into northern India, establishing the Ghaznavid Empire across most of today's Afghanistan, eastern Iran, and Pakistan.
  - November 27 – Battle of Peshawar: Jayapala suffers defeat from the Ghaznavid Empire.
- In Vietnam during the Early Lê dynasty, a rebellion broke out in Cử Long in Thanh Hóa province against king Lê Đại Hành. Former emperor Đinh Phế Đế, who was a general under Đại Hành's reign, died in the battle while suppressing that rebellion.
- Khmer King Jayavarman V is succeeded by Udayadityavarman I, and/or Suryavarman I.
- Construction begins on the Liaodi Pagoda, the tallest pagoda in Chinese history (completed in 1055).
- Japan
  - January 13 – Empress consort Fujiwara no Teishi dies in childbirth.
  - November – The imperial palace is destroyed by fire.
  - 70th birthday and longevity ceremony of Fujiwara no Bokushi (mother-in-law of Fujiwara no Michinaga, grandmother of Empress Shōshi).
  - 40th birthday of Empress dowager Senshi (mother of Emperor Ichijō).

==== Europe ====
- February 6 – After leading the revolt against Emperor Otto III and expelling the Crescentii, Gregory I, Count of Tusculum is named "Head of the Republic".
- July 31 – Emperor Otto III confirms the possessions of Ulric Manfred II of Turin, and grants him privileges.
- July – Sergius II becomes Patriarch of Constantinople.
- Byzantine Emperor Basil II attempts to reconquer Bulgaria.
- Robert II, King of France, marries for the third time, with Constance Taillefer d'Arles.
- Otto III, Holy Roman Emperor has Charlemagne's vault opened at Aachen Cathedral.
- The First Battle of Alton: Danish invaders defeat the English.
- Battle of Pinhoe: Vikings defeat the Anglo-Saxons in Devon.
- Bolesław I the Brave begins ruling parts of Slovakia.
- Bryachislav of Polotsk begins ruling Polotsk.
- Werner I, Bishop of Strasbourg begins ruling the Prince-Bishopric of Strasbourg.
- Ermengol I, Count of Urgell makes his second voyage to Rome.
- Thorgeir Ljosvetningagodi ends being a lawspeaker in Iceland's Althing.
- Ælfgar, bishop of Elmham, is consecrated.
- Æthelred becomes bishop of Cornwall, but dies shortly afterwards.
- The town of Lloret de Mar is founded in Catalonia.
- The first reference is made to Khotyn, Ukrainian town, and to Nyalka, Hungarian village, as to Chimudi.
- Brian Boru attacks the Uí Néill in Ireland.

==== North America ====
- Vikings, led by Leif Erikson, establish small settlements in and around Vinland in North America (approximate date).

=== By topic ===
==== Religion ====
- King Edward the Martyr of England is canonized.
- The Roman Catholic Archdiocese of Esztergom-Budapest is established.
- Oqropiri (Ioane I), Svimeon III and Melkisedek I are Catholicoi of Iberia within one year.
- A tomb of Saint Ivo (possibly) is uncovered in Huntingdonshire, England.

=== By place ===
==== Europe ====
- January 23 – Emperor Otto III dies, at the age of 22, of smallpox at Castle of Paterno (near Rome) after a 19-year reign. He leaves no son, nor a surviving brother who can succeed by hereditary right to the throne. Otto is buried in Aachen Cathedral alongside the body of Charlemagne.
- February 15 – At an assembly at Pavia of Lombard nobles and secondi milites (the minor nobles), Arduin of Ivrea (grandson of former King Berengar II) is restored to his domains and crowned as King of Italy in the Basilica of San Michele Maggiore. Arduin is supported by Arnulf II, archbishop of Milan.
- June 7 – Henry II, a cousin of Otto III, is elected and crowned as King of Germany by Archbishop Willigis at Mainz. Henry does not recognise the coronation of Arduin. Otto of Worms withdraws his nomination for the title of Holy Roman Emperor and receives the Duchy of Carinthia (modern Austria) - Henry is the first King to be elected away from the Cathedral of Aachen since the tradition was begun by Otto I in 936.
- July – Battle of Calatañazor: Christian armies led by Alfonso V of León, Sancho III of Pamplona and Sancho García of Castile, defeat the invading Saracens under Al-Mansur, the de facto ruler of Al-Andalus.
- August 8 – Al-Mansur dies after a 24-year reign and is succeeded by his son Abd al-Malik al-Muzaffar as ruler (hajib) of the Umayyad Caliphate of Córdoba (modern Spain).
- October 15 – Henry I, duke of Burgundy, dies and is succeeded by his stepson, Otto-William. He inherits the duchy; this is disputed by King Robert II of France ("the Pious").
- Fall – A revolt organized by Bohemian nobles of the rivalling Vršovci clan, forces Duke Boleslaus III ("the Red") to flee to Germany. He is succeeded by Vladivoj (until 1003).

==== British Isles ====
- November 13 – St. Brice's Day massacre: King Æthelred the Unready orders all Danes in England killed. Æthelred marries (as his second wife) Emma, daughter of Duke Richard I of Normandy.
- Winter – Æthelred pays tribute (or Danegeld) to Sweyn Forkbeard, buying him off with a massive payment of 24,000 lbs of silver to hold off further Viking raids against England.
- Brian Boru, king of Leinster and Munster, becomes High King of Ireland. After the submission of Máel Sechnaill mac Domnaill, Brian Boru makes an expedition to the North.

==== Persia ====
- Winter – Khalaf ibn Ahmad, Saffarid emir of Sistan (modern Iran), is deposed and surrenders to the Ghaznavid dynasty after a 39-year reign (approximate date).

==== Asia ====
- In Japan, court lady Sei Shōnagon completes writing The Pillow Book.

=== By topic ===
==== Religion ====
- June – Frederick, archbishop of Ravenna, is sent as an imperial legate to the Synod of Pöhlde, to mediate between the claims of Bishop Bernward of Hildesheim and Willigis, concerning the control of Gandersheim Abbey.

=== By place ===
==== Europe ====
- February 9 – Boleslaus III is restored to authority with armed support from Duke Bolesław I (the Brave) of Poland. The following months, Boleslaus' brothers Jaromír and Oldřich flee to Germany and place themselves under the protection of King Henry II, while Boleslaus orders the massacre of his Bohemian leading nobles at Vyšehrad.
- German–Polish War: Bolesław I annexes Bohemia and parts of Moravia (modern Slovakia). German nobles under Henry of Schweinfurt revolt against Henry II (who has been promised the Duchy of Bavaria).
- Count Oliba (Taillefer) Ripoll. Oliba takes up the Benedictine habit at the Monastery of Santa Maria de Ripoll.
- King Robert II (the Pious) invades Burgundy, but fails. After this fiasco Robert repudiates his second wife, Bertha of Burgundy, and marries Constance of Arles who becomes queen consort of France.
- King Rudolph III of Burgundy invests Humbert I (the White-Handed) with the domains of the Duchy of Aosta. He becomes the first count of the House of Savoy.
- King Stephen I of Hungary invades Transylvania (modern Romania) and establishes the Diocese of Transylvania (approximate date).
- Battle of Albesa: Muslim forces of the Caliphate of Cordoba defeat the northern Christian armies of León, Pamplona and Castile.

==== England ====
- King Sweyn I (Forkbeard) lands with a Danish Viking fleet in East Anglia, ravaging the countryside. Northumbria surrenders to him (approximate date).

==== Asia ====
- Emperor Sheng Zong of the Khitan-led Liao Dynasty leads an expedition into Mongolia and subdues the Zubu tribe who are forced to pay an annual tribute.
- Emperor Lê Hoàn of the Anterior Lê dynasty ordered the excavation of the Đa Cái Canal and quelled the rebellions of the Đa Cái people.

=== By topic ===
==== Art ====
- Construction of the Brihadisvara Temple in Tamil Nadu (modern India), during the Chola Dynasty (Early Medieval period).

==== Religion ====
- May 12 – Pope Sylvester II dies after a 4-year pontificate. He is succeeded by John XVII as the 140th pope of the Catholic Church.
- November 6 – John XVII dies after a pontificate of about 7 months and is buried in the Lateran Basilica at Rome.
- Heribert, archbishop of Cologne, founds Deutz Abbey at Deutz (Germany).

=== By place ===
==== Byzantine Empire ====
- Battle of Skopje: Emperor Basil II defeats the Bulgarian forces near Skopje (modern North Macedonia). Leaving his army behind, Samuel of Bulgaria manages to escape. Basil continues his campaign and besieges the fortress of Pernik. By the end of the year Basil has reconquered about half of the Bulgarian Empire.

==== Europe ====
- Spring – King Henry II crosses with an expeditionary force through the Brenner Pass to Trento. After initial military successes against Arduin of Ivrea, he receives the homage of the Italian clergy and Lombard noble families.
- May 14 – Henry II is crowned King of Italy by Archbishop Arnulf II in Pavia. A quarrel ensues between the German troops and the Pavese citizens. Henry orders a massacre of the population in response, destroying the city.
- Fall – Venetian-Byzantine forces defeat the Saracens at Bari. The citadel is on the brink of capitulation after a 3 day siege. Giovanni, a son of Doge Pietro Orseolo II, is married to the Byzantine princess Maria Argyra.
- German–Polish War: Duke Bolesław I of Poland loses Bohemia. With German support, Jaromír occupies Prague and proclaims himself the new duke. At Merseburg, he promises to hold Bohemia as a vassal of Henry II.
- Moorish forces under vizier Abd al-Malik al-Muzaffar sack the Catalan city of Manresa (modern Spain).
- Saracen pirates under the Balearic emir Mugahid sack Pisa, destroying nearly one-quarter of the city.
- Sancho III becomes king of Pamplona, Aragon and Castille (until 1035).

==== England ====
- A Danish Viking fleet under Sweyn Forkbeard lands in Norfolk. Ealdorman Ulfcytel orders his Anglo-Saxon troops to burn the raiding ships. The plan fails and Ulfcytel's small army is defeated by the Vikings.

==== Africa ====
- An episode of plague and famine breaks out in North Africa.

==== Persia ====
- Mahmud of Ghazni invades the Kingdom of Bhatia (modern-day Bhera, Pakistan). He defeats its ruler, Biji Rai, who is captured and subsequently immolates himself.

==== China ====
- Summer – Emperor Sheng Zong of Liao launches a major offensive against the Song dynasty. He invades Shanyang and threatens the Song capital of Kaifeng (approximate date).
- Jingdezhen porcelain enters a period of significant production during the Song dynasty.

==== Japan ====
- December – Fujiwara no Kenshi, the future empress consort, enters the palace as lady-in-waiting to her sister, Empress Shōshi.

=== By topic ===
==== Religion ====
- Spring – Pope John XVIII begins his reign as the 141st pope of the Catholic Church at Rome (until 1009).

=== By place ===
==== Europe ====
- Spring – The Republic of Pisa conducts a military offensive against the Saracen strongholds in Southern Italy. The Pisan fleet sacks the city of Reggio Calabria. Pisa becomes one of the four commercial Maritime Republics (the other three are Genoa, Venice and Amalfi), which fight each other for control of the Mediterranean Sea.

==== British Isles ====
- March 25 – King Kenneth III of Scotland is killed in the battle of Monzievaird in Strathearn. He is succeeded by his cousin Malcolm II ("Forranach, the Destroyer", son of the late King Kenneth II) as ruler of Scotland.
- Summer – Danish Viking raiders under Sweyn Forkbeard continue to ravage the cities (mostly poorly defended) in southern England. A famine strikes Sweyn's army, which has to live off the land.
- November 16 – Ælfric of Abingdon, archbishop of Canterbury, leaves ships to the people of Wiltshire and Kent in his will, leaving the best, equipped for 60 men, to King Æthelred the Unready.
- High King of Ireland Brian Boru makes a second expedition to the north, to take hostages from the northern kingdoms. During this campaign he visits Armagh – making an offering of 20 ounces of gold to the church and confirming to the apostolic see of Saint Patrick, ecclesiastical supremacy over the whole of Ireland.

==== Asia ====
- January 13–18 – The Shanyuan Treaty is negotiated between the Liao dynasty and the Song dynasty. The Song government agrees to pay an annual tribute of 200,000 bolts of raw silk and 100,000 taels of silver, ending the northern border clashes against Liao.
- May 13 – The Japanese court permits Fujiwara no Korechika to enter the palace.
- Lê Trung Tông succeeds his father Lê Hoàn as emperor of the early Lê dynasty (modern Vietnam), preceding anarchy and 8 months succession war with other princes. Lê Ngoạ Triều succeeded his brother Lê Trung Tông, by assassinating him after just a 3 day reign.

=== By topic ===
==== Arts and literature ====
- The Shūi Wakashū ("Collection of Gleanings"), an anthology of waka (poetry), is compiled by ex-Emperor Kazan of Japan (approximate date).

=== By place ===
==== Europe ====
- Summer – An Arab Saracen fleet appears before Pisa, but departs again. The Pisans take their fleet to sea and chase the Arabs down to Southern Italy where, in the Battle of Reggio Calabria, the Pisan fleet defeats the Arabs.
- Summer–Autumn – Danish Viking raiders led by Sweyn Forkbeard raid south-eastern England from the Isle of Wight to Reading in the Thames Valley where they overwinter at the Wallingford river crossing.
- Brian Boru visits Ulster, and remains unchallenged.

==== Oceania ====
- A major eruption of the Mount Merapi volcano on Java causes devastation throughout the centre of the island (which it covers with volcanic ash) and to the Javanese Hindu Mataram kingdom.

=== By topic ===
==== Astronomy ====
- April 30 – The brightest supernova ever recorded, SN 1006, occurs in the constellation of Lupus. It is observed and described in China, Japan, Iraq, Egypt, and Europe and possibly depicted in North American rock art. Modern astronomers now consider its distance at about 7,200 light-years. The supernova provides enough light to read by on a night with a dark moon.

=== By place ===
==== England ====
- King Æthelred the Unready pays the Danish Vikings a sum of 36,000 pounds of silver (Danegeld) to stop further invasions.

==== Ireland ====
- The Book of Kells is stolen from the Abbey of Kells.

==== Japan ====
- January 1 (New Year’s Day) – Imperial Princess Shushi is granted the title Ippon Shinno (first rank princess).
- January 29 – Ranking ceremony of Murasaki Shikibu – as a renowned writer and lady-in-waiting, tutor of Empress Shōshi, she is elevated to the highest position in the palace below the empress.
- April – Imperial Prince Tomohira receives the title nihon (second rank prince).

=== By topic ===
==== Religion ====
- November 1 – King Henry II of Germany founds the Diocese of Bamberg during a synod held in Frankfurt.
- Ælfheah of Canterbury travels to Rome to receive his pallium – symbol of his status as an archbishop – from Pope John XVIII.
- The Keraites, a Turco-Mongolian tribe, are converted to Nestorianism (a sect of Christianity).

=== By place ===
==== Europe ====
- Olaf Haraldsson, future king of Norway, makes raids in the Baltic Sea. He lands on the Estonian island of Saaremaa, wins a battle there, and forces the inhabitants to pay tribute.
- Battle at Herdaler: Olaf Haraldsson sails to the southern coast of Finland to plunder, where he and his men are ambushed and defeated in the woods.
- The oldest known mention is made of the city of Gundelfingen (Southern Germany).
- Unification of the Georgian realm.
- In England, King Æthelred the Unready orders a new fleet of warships built, organised on a national scale. It is a huge undertaking, but is completed the following year.

==== Arabian Empire ====
- Caliph Al-Hakim bi-Amr Allah sends a tributary mission to Emperor Zhenzong of the Song dynasty in order to reestablish trade relations between the Fatimid Caliphate and China (approximate date).

==== Japan ====
- November 13 – Kamo Special Festival: The poet Murasaki Shikibu is given her name from a famous court poet, Fujiwara no Kinto; this year she probably starts to write The Diary of Lady Murasaki.
- 42nd Birthday of Fujiwara no Michinaga, father-in-law of the emperor, is celebrated.

Vietnam

- Under the Early Lê dynasty, King Lê Long Đĩnh personally marched into battle to defeat the barbarians in Đô Lương and Vị Long provinces.

=== By topic ===
==== Religion ====
- Autumn – Bruno of Querfurt, a missionary bishop, and 18 companions sets out on a mission to spread Christianity among the Prussians.
- Olof Skötkonung, king of Sweden, is baptized in Husaby (Västergötland) by missionary Sigfrid, and makes generous donations on the spot.

=== By place ===
==== Europe ====
- February 14 or March 9 – The first known mention is made of the name of Lithuania, in connection with the murder of Bruno of Querfurt. He is beheaded and his 18 companions are hanged the same day during a mission among the Prussians in the Baltic region.
- May 9 – Lombard Revolt: Lombard forces led by Melus, an Italian nobleman, revolt in Bari against the Catepanate of Italy (a province of the Byzantine Empire). He and his brother-in-law Dattus (or Datto) mobilise a large army and invade southern Italy.
- November 1 – Berber forces led by Sulayman ibn al-Hakam defeat the Umayyad caliph Muhammad II in the battle of Alcolea. He enters the city of Córdoba, which is sacked by Berbers and Castillans. Sulayman is elected as caliph of the Caliphate of Córdoba.
- Doge Pietro II Orseolo dies after an 18-year reign in which he has started the expansion of Venetia by conquering the islands of Lastovo and Korčula along the Dalmatian coast. Pietro is succeeded by his 16-year-old son Otto Orseolo as sole ruler of Venice.
- Law on planning and building passed in Serbia during the reign of Prince Jovan Vladimir.

==== England ====
- Danish Viking raiders led by Sweyn Forkbeard repeatedly attack southern England, destroying the land to avenge the St. Brice's Day massacre of 1002.
- August – A large Viking army led by Thorkell the Tall lands on Kent and proceeds to terrorize most of Southern England.

==== Asia ====
- Spring – General Kang Cho leads a coup against King Mokjong. He is deposed and sent into exile in Chungju. After murdering Mokjong, Kang Cho places Hyeonjong on the throne as ruler of Goryeo.
- 19th November – The end of the Anterior Lê dynasty was followed by the death of emperor Lê Long Đĩnh.
- 21st November – The Lý Dynasty in Vietnam is proclaimed by Emperor Lý Thái Tổ (former commander of the palace guard) after the death of Lê Long Đĩnh, the last monarch of the Lê Dynasty.

==== Japan ====
- Princess Takahime (daughter of Imperial Prince Tomohira, cousin of emperor Ichijo) is married to Fujiwara no Yorimichi, first son of Fujiwara no Michinaga, enlarging the latter’s power.
- Takashina no Mitsuko is imprisoned for cursing the empress; Fujiwara no Korechika is also implicated but later pardoned.
- Murasaki Shikibu teaches the Chinese written language to Empress Shoshi in secret because this is usually a male accomplishment.

=== By topic ===
==== Religion ====
- Summer – Pope John XVIII dies after a pontificate of 5 years. He is succeeded by Sergius IV as the 142nd pope of the Catholic Church.
- August 29 – Mainz Cathedral suffers extensive damage from a fire, which destroys the building on the day of its inauguration.
- October 18 – The Church of the Holy Sepulchre in Jerusalem is destroyed by the Fatimid caliph Al-Hakim bi-Amr Allah.

== Science and technology ==
- The scientific achievements of the Islamic civilization reach their zenith. Major works from this decade include Ibn al-Haytham (Alhacen)'s Book of Optics, Abu al-Qasim al-Zahrawi (Abulcasis)'s 30-volume medical encyclopedia, the Al-Tasrif.
- Other significant contributions to scientific and mathematical understanding were made by Avicenna, who would later publish influential works on medicine, Persian Muslim polymath and scientist Abu Rayhan al-Biruni, Arab Egyptian Muslim mathematician and astronomer Ibn Yunus, Persian Muslim physicist and mathematician Abu Sahl al-Quhi (Kuhi) and Persian Muslim astronomer and mathematician, Abu-Mahmud al-Khujandi.
- The Law of sines is discovered by Muslim mathematicians.
- Bell foundry is founded in Italy.
- Gunpowder is invented in China.

== Significant people ==
- Abd al-Rahman Ibn Yunus
- Al-Qadir caliph of Baghdad
- Abu al-Qasim al-Zahrawi (Abulcasis)
- Abu-Mahmud al-Khujandi
- Abu Nasr Mansur
- Abu Rayhan al-Biruni
- Alhacen (Ibn al-Haytham)
- Avicenna (Ibn Sina)
- Basil II
- Boleslaus I of Poland
- Brian Boru
- Bruno of Querfurt
- Robert II of France
- Robert Guiscard
- Roger I of Sicily
- Sancho III of Navarre
- Stephen I of Hungary
- Sweyn I of Denmark
- Tsar Samuil of Bulgaria

== Births ==
1000

- June 22 – Robert I, duke of Normandy (d. 1035)
- Adalbert, duke of Upper Lorraine (d. 1048)
- Adalbert, archbishop of Hamburg (d. 1072)
- Argyrus, Byzantine general (approximate date)
- Berthold II, duke of Carinthia (approximate date)
- Constantine IX, Byzantine emperor (d. 1055)
- Dominic of Silos, Spanish abbot (d. 1073)
- Egbert, German Benedictine abbot (d. 1058)
- Duthac, patron saint of Tain (Scotland) (d. 1065)
- Gilbert, Norman nobleman (approximate date)
- Guigues I, French nobleman (approximate date)
- Irmgardis, German noblewoman and saint (d. 1065 or 1082/1089)
- John Mauropous, Byzantine hymnographer (d. c.1070/1092)
- Kyiso, Burmese king of the Pagan Dynasty (d. 1038)
- Liudolf, German nobleman (approximate date)
- Lý Thái Tông, Vietnamese emperor (d. 1054)
- Michael I, Byzantine patriarch (approximate date)
- Al-Mu'ayyad fi'l-Din al-Shirazi, Fatimid scholar (d. 1078)
- Otto Bolesławowic, Polish prince (d. 1033)
- Qawam al-Dawla, Buyid governor (d. 1028)
- Robert de Turlande, French priest (d. 1067)
- Rotho, bishop of Paderborn (approximate date)
- Sylvester III, pope of the Catholic Church (d. 1063)
- Uta von Ballenstedt, margravine of Meissen
- William V, count of Auvergne (d. 1064)
- Yi Yuanji. Chinese painter (approximate date)

1001

- March 29 – Sokkate, Burmese king (d. 1044)
- Al-Qa'im, Abbasid caliph (d. 1075)
- Duncan I, king of Alba (Scotland) (d. 1040)
- Godwin, English nobleman (d. 1053)
- Herluin de Conteville, Norman nobleman (d. 1066)
- Ingegerd Olofsdotter, Grand Princess of Kiev (d. 1050)

1002

- May 10 – Al-Khatib al-Baghdadi, Muslim scholar (d. 1071)
- June 21 – Leo IX, pope of the Catholic Church (d. 1054)
- Airlangga, ruler (rajah) of Kahuripan (Indonesia) (d. 1049)
- Adolf II of Lotharingia, German nobleman (d. 1041)
- Alice of Normandy, countess of Burgundy (d. 1038)
- Aristakes Lastivertsi, Armenian historian (d. 1080)
- George I, king of Georgia (approximate date)
- Mei Yaochen, poet of the Song dynasty (d. 1060)
- Nikephoros III, Byzantine emperor (d. 1081)

1003

- Amatus, bishop of Nusco (approximate date)
- Conrad II (the Younger), duke of Carinthia (d. 1039)
- Edward the Confessor, king of England (d. 1066)
- Frederick, duke of Lower Lorraine (approximate date)
- Hedwig (or Advisa), French princess (approximate date)
- Herleva, Norman noblewoman (approximate date)
- Ibn Hayyus, Syrian poet and panegyrist (d. 1081)
- Ibn Zaydún, Andalusian poet and writer (d. 1071)
- Jing Zong, Chinese emperor of Western Xia (d. 1048)
- Liudolf of Brunswick, margrave of Frisia (d. 1038)
- Musharrif al-Dawla, Buyid emir of Iraq (d. 1025)

1004

- Abdallah ibn Al-Aftas, founder of the Aftasid Dynasty (d. 1060)
- Dedi I (or Dedo), margrave of Saxon Ostmark (d. 1075)
- Godgifu, daughter of Æthelred the Unready (approximate date)
- Guido of Acqui (or Wido), Italian bishop (approximate date)
- Minamoto no Takakuni, Japanese nobleman (d. 1077)
- Nasir Khusraw, Persian poet and philosopher (d. 1088)
- William VI ("the Fat"), French nobleman (d. 1038)

1005

- June 20 – al-Zahir li-i'zaz Din Allah, Fatimid caliph of Egypt (d. 1036)
- September 26 – Fujiwara no Nagaie, Japanese nobleman (d. 1064)
- A Nong, Chinese shaman and matriarch (approximate date)
- Berenguer Ramon I, Spanish nobleman (d. 1035)
- Bertha of Blois, duchess consort of Brittany (approximate date)
- Eilika of Schweinfurt, German noblewoman (approximate date)
- Frederick II, German nobleman and overlord (d. 1075)
- Llywelyn Aurdorchog, Welsh nobleman (approximate date)
- Macbeth ("Rí Deircc, the Red King"), king of Scotland (approximate date)
- Mahmud al-Kashgari, Turkish lexicographer (d. 1102)

1006

- October 23 – Wen Yanbo, grand chancellor (d. 1097)
- Al-Lakhmi, Fatimid scholar and jurist (d. 1085)
- Constantine X, Byzantine emperor (d. 1067)
- Ísleifur Gissurarson, Icelandic bishop (d. 1080)
- Khwaja Abdullah Ansari, Persian Sufi poet (d. 1088)

1007

- Emeric, Hungarian prince and co-heir (approximate date)
- Gervais de Château-du-Loir, French nobleman (d. 1067)
- Giselbert, count of Luxembourg (approximate date)
- Hugh Magnus (Hugues le Grand), king of France (d. 1025)
- Ibn Sidah, Andalusian linguist and lexicographer (d. 1066)
- Isaac I Komnenos, Byzantine emperor (approximate date)
- Maitripada, Indian Buddhist philosopher (d. 1085)
- Ouyang Xiu, Chinese historian and poet (d. 1072)
- Peter Damian, cardinal-bishop of Ostia (d. 1073)
- Welf III, duke of Carinthia (approximate date)

1008

- May 4 – Henry I, king of France (d. 1060)
- October 12 – Atsuhira, future Emperor Go-Ichijō of Japan (d. 1036)
- Al-Mu'izz ibn Badis, Zirid ruler of Ifriqiya (d. 1062)
- Anselm of Liège, French chronicler and historian
- Di Qing, general of the Song Dynasty (d. 1057)
- Gothelo II (or Gozelo), duke of Lower Lorraine (d. 1046)
- Sugawara no Takasue, Japanese writer (approximate date)
- Wulfstan, bishop of Worcester (approximate date)

1009

- May 22 – Su Xun, Chinese writer (d. 1066)
- December 14 – Atsunaga, future Emperor Go-Suzaku of Japan (d. 1045)
- Adèle of France, countess of Flanders (d. 1079)
- Ali Hariri, Marwanid poet and philosopher (d. 1079)
- George the Hagiorite, Georgian calligrapher (d. 1065)
- Qatran Tabrizi, Persian poet and writer (d. 1072)
- Toirdelbach Ua Briain, king of Munster (d. 1086)
- Yusuf ibn Tashfin, sultan of Morocco (d. 1106)

== Deaths ==
1000

- May 17 – Ramwold, German Benedictine monk and abbot
- September 9 – Olaf Tryggvason (or Olaf I), king of Norway
- Abu'l Haret Ahmad, Farighunid ruler (approximate date)
- Abu-Mahmud Khojandi, Persian astronomer and Mathematics in medieval Islam/mathematician
- Abū Sahl al-Qūhī, Persian physician, mathematician and astronomer
- Abu Sahl 'Isa ibn Yahya al-Masihi, Persian physician
- Ahmad ibn Fadlan, Arab traveller and writer (approximate date)
- Ælfthryth, English queen and wife of King Edgar the Peaceful (approximate date)
- Barjawan, vizier and regent of the Fatimid Caliphate
- Fantinus (the Younger), Italian hermit and abbot
- García Sáchez II, king of Pamplona (approximate date)
- Gosse Ludigman, governor (potestaat) of Friesland
- Huyan Zan, Chinese general of the Song Dynasty
- Ivar of Waterford, Norse Viking king of Dublin
- Jacob ibn Jau, Andalusian-Jewish silk-manufacturer
- Judah ben David Hayyuj, Moroccan-Jewish linguist
- Malfrida, Russian Grand Princess consort of Kiev
- Manfred I, Frankish nobleman (approximate date)
- Masako, Japanese empress consort (b. 950)
- Minamoto no Shigeyuki, Japanese waka poet
- Shahriyar III, Bavand ruler of Tabaristan
- Tyra of Denmark, queen consort of Norway
- Ukhtanes of Sebastia, Armenian historian

1001

- January 13 – Fujiwara no Teishi, empress of Japan (b. 977)
- January 22 – Al-Muqallad ibn al-Musayyab, Uqaylid emir of Mosul
- October 7 – Æthelstan, bishop of Elmham
- December 21 – Hugh, margrave of Tuscany
- Conrad, margrave of Ivrea
- David III of Tao ("the Great"), Georgian prince
- Đinh Phế Đế, Vietnamese emperor (b. 974)
- Ermengarda de Vallespir, Spanish countess
- Izyaslav, Kievan prince of Polotsk
- Ja'far ibn al-Furat, Ikhshidid and Fatimid vizier (b. 921)
- Jayapala, Indian ruler of the Hindu Shahis
- Jayavarman V, emperor of the Khmer Empire
- Wang Yucheng, Chinese official and poet (b. 954)
- Ziri ibn Atiyya, emir of Morocco

1002

- January 8 – Wulfsige III, bishop of Sherborne
- January 23 – Otto III, Holy Roman Emperor (b. 980)
- April 23 – Æscwig, bishop of Dorchester
- April 30 – Eckard I, margrave of Meissen
- May 6 – Ealdwulf, archbishop of York
- August 8 – Al-Mansur, Umayyad vizier and de facto ruler (b. 938)
- October 15 – Henry I, duke of Burgundy (b. 946)
- November 13
  - Gunhilde, Danish princess and noblewoman
  - Pallig, Danish chieftain (jarl) of Devonshire
- Athanasius IV, Syrian patriarch of Antioch
- Dominic, archbishop of Esztergom
- Gisela, French princess (approximate date)
- Godfrey I (the Prisoner), Frankish nobleman
- John the Iberian, Georgian monk (approximate date)
- Kisai Marvazi, Persian author and poet (b. 953)
- Rogneda of Polotsk, Grand Princess of Kiev (b. 962)
- Sa'id al-Dawla, Hamdanid emir of Aleppo (Syria)
- Sancho Ramírez, king of Viguera (approximate date)

1003

- January 19 – Kilian of Cologne, Irish abbot
- January 25 – Lothair I, margrave of the Nordmark
- May 4 – Herman II, duke of Swabia (Germany)
- May 12 – Sylvester II, pope of the Catholic Church
- July 11 – Al-Mansur al-Qasim al-Iyyani, Zaidi imam
- August 3 – At-Ta'i, Abbasid caliph of Baghdad (b. 929)
- November 6 – John XVII, pope of the Catholic Church
- December 24 – William II, German nobleman
- December 27 – Emma of Blois, duchess of Aquitaine
- Athanasius the Athonite, Byzantine monk (b. 920)
- Brian mac Maelruanaidh, king of Maigh Seóla (Ireland)
- Didda, queen consort and regent of Kashmir (India)
- Erik the Red, Norse Viking explorer (approximate date)
- Flannchad ua Ruaidíne, abbot of Clonmacnoise
- Gregory of Narek, Armenian theologian (b. 951)
- Gurgen IV, king of Vaspurakan (Armenia)
- Ibrahim ibn Baks, Buyid scholar and physician
- Philotheos, patriarch of Alexandria (Egypt)
- Rozala, French queen and countess of Flanders
- Vladivoj, duke of Bohemia (Czech Republic)

1004

- June – Frederick, archbishop of Ravenna
- July 11 – Theobald II, French nobleman
- November 4 – Otto I, duke of Carinthia
- November 13 – Abbo of Fleury, French abbot
- Adelaide of Aquitaine, French queen consort
- Aderald, French priest and archdeacon
- Eochaid ua Flannacáin, Irish cleric and poet (b. 935)
- Gisilher (or Giselmar), archbishop of Magdeburg
- Khusrau Shah, king of the Justanids (approximate date)
- Li, empress consort of the Song Dynasty (b. 960)
- Li Jiqian, Chinese governor and rebel leader (b. 963)
- Ragnall mac Gofraid, king of the Isles (or 1005)
- Soběslav (or Soběbor), Bohemian nobleman
- Wulfric Spot, English nobleman (approximate date)

1005

- March 25 – Kenneth III ("An Donn, the Chief"), king of Scotland
- October 31 – Abe no Seimei, Japanese astrologer (b. 921)
- November 16 – Ælfric of Abingdon, archbishop of Canterbury
- December 14 – Adalbero II, bishop of Verdun and Metz
- December 27 – Nilus the Younger, Byzantine abbot (b. 910)
- Abu Hilal al-Askari, Muslim scholar and writer (b. 920)
- Cynan ap Hywel, prince of Gwynedd (approximate date)
- Lê Hoàn, emperor of the Early Lê dynasty (b. 941)
- Lê Trung Tông, emperor of the Early Lê dynasty (b. 983)
- Isma'il Muntasir ("Victorious"), ruler of the Samanids
- Mael Ruanaidh Ua Dubhda, king of Connacht
- Ma Yize, Muslim astronomer of the Song dynasty
- Ragnall mac Gofraid, king of the Isles (or 1004)
- Sigmundur Brestisson, Viking chieftain (b. 961)
- Yves de Bellême, Norman nobleman (approximate date)

1006

- February 13 – Fulcran, bishop of Lodève (France)
- July 21 – Gisela of Burgundy, duchess of Bavaria
- December 26 – Gao Qiong, Chinese general (b. 935)
- Ælfhelm of York, ealdorman (dux) of Northumbria
- Azon the Venerable (or Atso), French prelate
- Fiachra Ua Focarta, abbot of Clonfert (Ireland)
- Giovanni Orseolo, Venetian nobleman (b. 981)
- Ibn Marzuban, Persian official and physician
- Maud of Normandy, French noblewoman
- Olaf the Peacock, Icelandic merchant
- Sherira Gaon, Jewish spiritual leader
- Cenwulf, bishop of Winchester (approximate date)

1007

- February 27 – Ælfwaru, English noblewoman
- March 20 – Abu Rakwa, Andalusian Umayyad prince
- July 21 – Gisela of Burgundy, duchess of Bavaria
- October 31 – Heriger, abbot of Lobbes (Belgium)
- Attilanus, bishop of Zamora (Spain) (b. 937)
- Badi' al-Zaman al-Hamadani, Persian poet (b. 969)
- Guo, empress of the Song Dynasty (b. 975)
- Manjutakin, Fatimid general and governor
- Maslama al-Majriti, Andalusian chemist
- Pelayo Rodríguez, count (comes) of León
- Sebastian, archbishop of Esztergom
- Urraca Fernández, Galician queen

1008

- March 17 – Kazan, emperor of Japan (b. 968)
- April 7 – Ludolf (or Liudolf), archbishop of Trier
- April 10 – Notker of Liège, French bishop (b. 940)
- May 25
  - Bishi, Japanese imperial princess
  - Matilda of Saxony, countess of Flanders
- October 6 – Menendo González, Galician nobleman
- November 20 – Geoffrey I, duke of Brittany (b. 980)
- Abd al-Malik al-Muzaffar, Andalusian court official
- Clothna mac Aenghusa, Irish poet (approximate date)
- Gunnlaugr Ormstunga, Icelandic poet (approximate date)
- Gurgen II (Magistros), king of Iberia-Kartli (Georgia)
- Ibn Zur'a, Abbasid physician and philosopher (b. 943)
- Madudan mac Gadhra Mór, king of Síol Anmchadha
- Poppo, Polish missionary bishop (approximate date)
- Raymond III, French nobleman (approximate date)
- Rotbold I (or Rotbaud), French nobleman
- Sarolt, Grand Princess of Hungary (b. 950)

1009

- February 14 – Bruno of Querfurt, German missionary bishop
- March 2 – Mokjong, king of Goryeo (Korea) (b. 980)
- March 3 – Abd al-Rahman Sanchuelo, Umayyad chief minister (b. 983)
- June or July – John XVIII, pope of the Catholic Church
- August 21 – Tomohira, Japanese imperial prince (uncle of the emperor)
- November 13 – Dedo I, German nobleman (b. 950)
- November 19 – Lê Long Đĩnh, emperor of the Lê Dynasty (b. 986)
- December 25 – Bernard William, French nobleman
- Abu al-Hasan Ali, Ma'munid ruler of Khwarezm (Iran)
- Abu Muhammad Lu'lu' al-Kabir, emir of Aleppo (Syria)
- Fujiwara no Nagatō, Japanese bureaucrat and poet (b. 949)
- Ibn Yunus, Fatimid astronomer and mathematician
- Khalaf ibn Ahmad, emir of the Saffarid Dynasty (b. 937)
- Pietro II Orseolo, doge of Venice (b. 961)
- Xiao Yanyan, Chinese Khitan empress (b. 953)
