= AD 1000 =

Calendar year

1000 in various calendars
- Gregorian calendar: 1000; M
- Ab urbe condita: 1753
- Armenian calendar: 449; ԹՎ ՆԽԹ
- Assyrian calendar: 5750
- Balinese saka calendar: 921–922
- Bengali calendar: 406–407
- Berber calendar: 1950
- English Regnal year: N/A
- Buddhist calendar: 1544
- Burmese calendar: 362
- Byzantine calendar: 6508–6509
- Chinese calendar: 己亥年 (Earth Pig); 3697 or 3490 — to — 庚子年 (Metal Rat); 3698 or 3491
- Coptic calendar: 716–717
- Discordian calendar: 2166
- Ethiopian calendar: 992–993
- Hebrew calendar: 4760–4761
- Hindu calendars
- Vikram Samvat: 1056–1057
- Shaka Samvat: 921–922
- Kali Yuga: 4100–4101
- Holocene calendar: 11000
- Igbo calendar: 0–1
- Iranian calendar: 378–379
- Islamic calendar: 390–391
- Japanese calendar: Chōhō 2 (長保２年)
- Javanese calendar: 901–902
- Julian calendar: 1000; M
- Korean calendar: 3333
- Minguo calendar: 912 before ROC 民前912年
- Nanakshahi calendar: −468
- Seleucid era: 1311/1312 AG
- Thai solar calendar: 1542–1543
- Tibetan calendar: ས་མོ་ཕག་ལོ་ (female Earth-Boar); 1126 or 745 or −27 — to — ལྕགས་ཕོ་བྱི་བ་ལོ་ (male Iron-Rat); 1127 or 746 or −26

1000 (M) was a leap year starting on Monday of the Julian calendar, the 1000th year of the Common Era (CE) and Anno Domini (AD) designations, the 1000th and last year of the 1st millennium, the 100th and last year of the 10th century, and the 1st year of the 1000s decade. As of the start of 1000, the Gregorian calendar was 5 days ahead of the Julian calendar, which was the dominant calendar of the time.

In the proleptic Gregorian calendar, it was a non-leap century year starting on Wednesday (like 1800).

The year falls well into the period of Old World history known as the Middle Ages; in Europe, it is sometimes and by convention considered the boundary date between the Early Middle Ages and the High Middle Ages. The Muslim world was in its Islamic Golden Age. China was in its Song dynasty, Korea was in its Goryeo dynasty, Vietnam was in its Anterior Lê dynasty and Japan was in its classical Heian period. India was divided into a number of lesser empires, such as the Eastern Chalukyas, Pala Empire (Kamboja Pala dynasty; Mahipala), Chola dynasty (Rajaraja I), Yadava dynasty, etc. Sub-Saharan Africa had developing urban centers and empires such as the Ghana Empire of the Wagadu, and the Trans-Saharan slave trade was beginning to be an important factor in the formation of the Sahelian kingdoms. The pre-Columbian New World was in a time of general transition in many regions. Wari and Tiwanaku cultures receded in power and influence while Chachapoya and Chimú cultures rose to prominence in South America. In Mesoamerica, the Maya Terminal Classic period saw the decline of many grand polities of the Petén like Palenque and Tikal yet a renewed vigor and greater construction phases of sites in the Yucatán Peninsula like Chichen Itza and Uxmal. Mitla, with Mixtec influence, became the more important site of the Zapotec, overshadowing the waning Monte Albán. Cholula flourished in central Mexico, as did Tula, the center of Toltec culture.

The World population is estimated to have been between c. 250 and 310 million.

== Events ==
=== Japan ===
- January 10: Death of Empress Dowager Masako (empress consort of the late Emperor Reizei).
- April 8: Fujiwara no Shoshi is promoted to Empress (Chugu), while there is another empress, Fujiwara no Teishi (kogo) - this is the first time that there are two empresses.
- Palace Scandal: Princess Consort Yasuko has an affair. Michinaga (her half-brother) investigates it secretly and finds out the truth about her pregnancy. Yasuko cries and repents. Yasuko leaves the palace under the patronage of Empress Dowager Senshi and Michinaga (moved to his residence).
- Murasaki Shikibu starts to write The Tale of Genji.
- Ichimonjiya Wasuke, the oldest surviving wagashi store, is established as a teahouse adjacent to Imamiya Shrine.

=== Americas ===
- The Taíno have become the dominant culture of modern day Puerto Rico.

=== Christendom ===
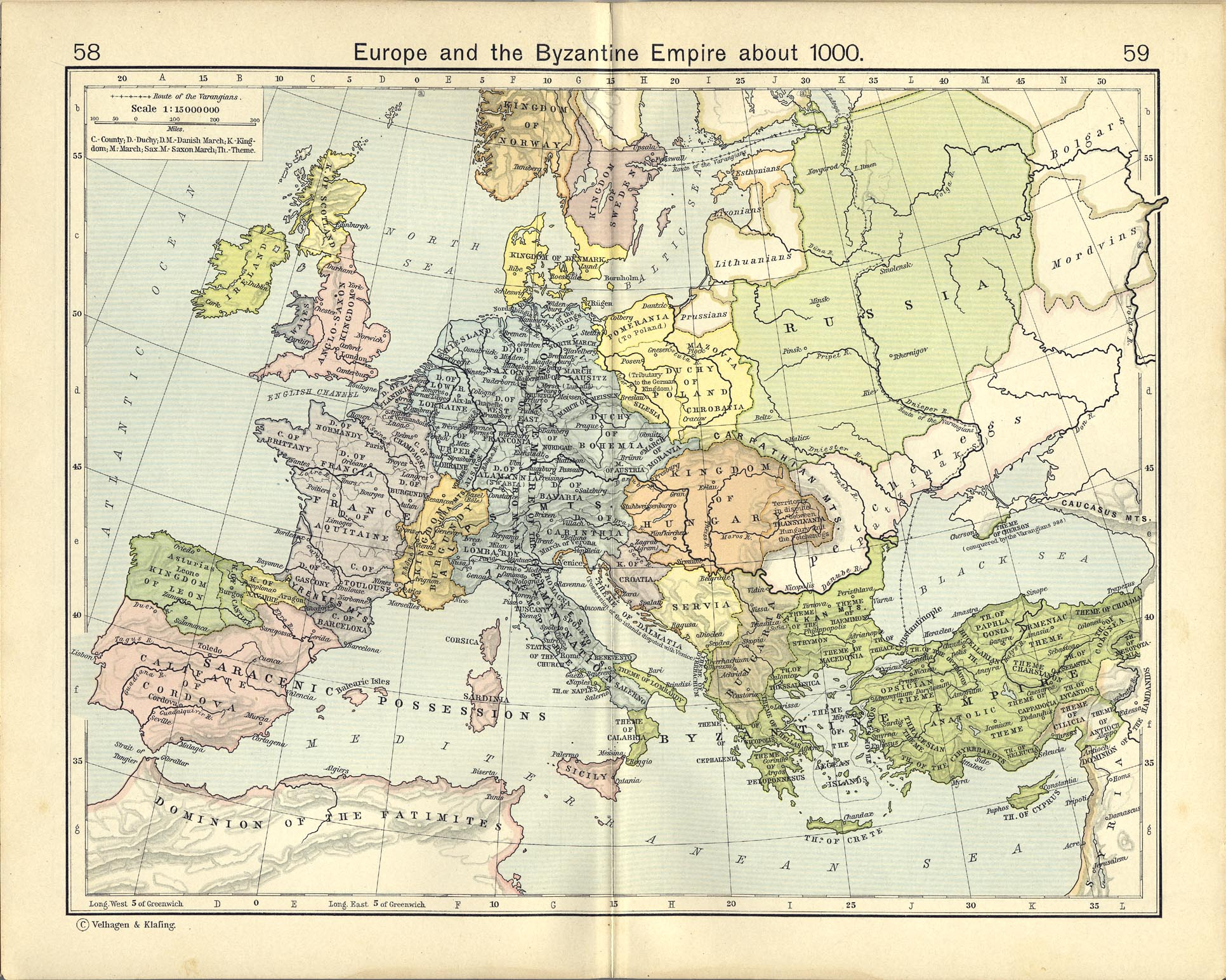
Western Europe, the Holy Roman Empire, Kievan Russia, and the Byzantine Empire in the Middle Ages (year 1000)

- In continental Europe, the Holy Roman Empire establishes itself as the most powerful state. The Holy Roman Emperor Otto III makes a pilgrimage from Rome to Aachen and Gniezno (Gnesen), stopping at Regensburg, Meissen, Magdeburg and Gniezno. The Congress of Gniezno (with Bolesław I the Brave) is part of his pilgrimage. In Rome, he builds the basilica of San Bartolomeo all'Isola, to host the relics of St. Bartholomew.
- In the Kingdom of France, Robert II, the son of Hugh Capet, is the second King of the Capetian dynasty from 996 to 1031. "Awakening of heresy" in his kingdom.
- Byzantine conquest of Bulgaria: The Byzantine Empire under the Macedonian dynasty is engaged in a long and hard war with the First Bulgarian Empire. The Byzantine generals Theodorokanos and Nikephoros Xiphias capture the former Bulgarian capitals of Pliska and Great Preslav, along with Little Preslav, extending Byzantine control over the northeastern portion of the Bulgarian state (Mysia and Scythia Minor). At the same time, Byzantium was instrumental in the Christianization of Kievan Rus' and of other medieval confederations of Slavic states.
- In Great Britain, a unified Kingdom of England has developed out of the various Anglo-Saxon kingdoms.
- The Christianization of Scandinavia is in its early stages, with the Althing of the Icelandic Commonwealth embracing Christianity this year. On September 9, the King of Norway, Olaf Tryggvason, is defeated by the Scandinavian kingdoms of Denmark and Sweden in the Battle of Svolder. Sweyn Forkbeard establishes Danish control over part of Norway. What becomes the city of Oslo in Norway is in existence (the exact year is debatable, but the 1,000 year anniversary is held in the year 2000). In or around this year, Norse explorer Leif Erikson becomes the first European to land in the Americas, at L'Anse aux Meadows in modern-day Newfoundland.
- The papacy during this time is in a period of decline, in retrospect known as the saeculum obscurum ("Dark Age") or "pornocracy" ("rule of harlots"), a state of affairs that will result in the Great Schism between Roman Catholicism and Eastern Orthodoxy later in the 11th century.
- The Kingdom of Hungary is established this year as a Christian state. In the next centuries, the Kingdom of Hungary becomes the pre-eminent cultural power in the Central European region. On December 25, Stephen I is crowned as the first King of Hungary in Esztergom.
- In Spain, the Reconquista is gaining some ground, but the southern Iberian peninsula will still be dominated by Islam for centuries to come; Córdoba is the world's largest city at this time, with 450,000 inhabitants.
- In the Kingdom of Croatia the army of the Republic of Venice led by Doge Pietro II Orseolo conquers the island of Lastovo.
- The Château de Goulaine vineyard is founded in France.
- The archdiocese in Gniezno is founded, with Radim Gaudentius, from the Slavník dynasty, as first archbishop, and dioceses in Kołobrzeg, Kraków and Wrocław.

=== Islamic world ===
The Muslim world is in its Golden Age; still organised in caliphates, it continues to be dominated by the Abbasid Caliphate, with the Caliphate of Córdoba to the west, the Fatimid Caliphate in North Africa, and experiences ongoing campaigns in Africa and in India. At this time, Persia is in a period of instability, with various polities seceding from Abbasid rule, among whom the Ghaznavids will emerge as the most powerful.

The Islamic world is reaching the peak of its historical scientific achievements. Important scholars and scientists who flourish at this time include Al-Zahrawi (Abcasis), Ibn Yunus (publishes his astronomical treatise Al-Zij al-Hakimi al-Kabir in Cairo in c. 1000), Abu Sahl al-Quhi (Kuhi), Abu-Mahmud Khujandi, Abu Nasr Mansur, Abu al-Wafa' al-Buzjani, Ahmad ibn Fadlan, Ali Ibn Isa, Al-Karaji (al-Karkhi), Ibn al-Haytham (Book of Optics), Avicenna, Averroes and Al-Biruni.

By this time, the Turkic migration from the Eurasian Steppe has reached Eastern Europe, and most of the Turkic tribes (Khazars, Bulgars, Pechenegs etc.) have been Islamized.

=== Mesopotamia ===
- Babylon is abandoned around this year.

== Largest cities ==
1. Córdoba, Caliphate of Córdoba – 450,000
2. Kaifeng, Song Dynasty (China) – 400,000
3. Constantinople, Byzantine Empire – 300,000
4. Angkor, Khmer Empire (Cambodia) – 200,000
5. Kyoto, Heian period (Japan) – 175,000
6. Cairo, Fatimid Caliphate – 135,000
7. Baghdad, Buyid Dynasty (Iraq) – 125,000
8. Nishapur, Ghaznavid Dynasty (Iran) – 125,000
9. Al-Hasa, Qarmatian State (Arabia) – 110,000
10. Patan, Kingdom of Gujarat (India) – 100,000

== Births ==
- June 22 – Robert I, duke of Normandy (d. 1035)
- Adalbert, duke of Upper Lorraine (d. 1048)
- Adalbert, archbishop of Hamburg (d. 1072)
- Argyrus, Byzantine general (approximate date)
- Berthold II, duke of Carinthia (approximate date)
- Constantine IX, Byzantine emperor (d. 1055)
- Dominic of Silos, Spanish abbot (d. 1073)
- Egbert, German Benedictine abbot (d. 1058)
- Duthac, patron saint of Tain (Scotland) (d. 1065)
- Gilbert, Norman nobleman (approximate date)
- Guigues I, French nobleman (approximate date)
- Irmgardis, German noblewoman and saint (d. 1065 or 1082/1089)
- John Mauropous, Byzantine hymnographer (d. c.1070/1092)
- Kyiso, Burmese king of the Pagan dynasty (d. 1038)
- Liudolf, German nobleman (approximate date)
- Lý Thái Tông, Vietnamese emperor (d. 1054)
- Michael I, Byzantine patriarch (approximate date)
- Al-Mu'ayyad fi'l-Din al-Shirazi, Fatimid scholar (d. 1078)
- Otto Bolesławowic, Polish prince (d. 1033)
- Qawam al-Dawla, Buyid governor (d. 1028)
- Robert de Turlande, French priest (d. 1067)
- Rotho, bishop of Paderborn (approximate date)
- Sylvester III, pope of the Catholic Church (d. 1063)
- Uta von Ballenstedt, margravine of Meissen
- William V, count of Auvergne (d. 1064)
- Yi Yuanji. Chinese painter (approximate date)

== Deaths ==
- May 17 – Ramwold, German Benedictine monk and abbot
- September 9 – Olaf Tryggvason (Olaf I), king of Norway
- Abu'l Haret Ahmad, Farighunid ruler (approximate date)
- Abu-Mahmud Khojandi, Persian astronomer and mathematician
- Abū Sahl al-Qūhī, Persian physician, mathematician and astronomer
- Abu Sahl 'Isa ibn Yahya al-Masihi, Persian physician
- Ahmad ibn Fadlan, Arab traveller and writer (approximate date)
- Ælfthryth, English queen and wife of King Edgar the Peaceful (approximate date)
- Barjawan, vizier and regent of the Fatimid Caliphate
- Fantinus (the Younger), Italian hermit and abbot
- García Sáchez II, king of Pamplona (approximate date)
- Gosse Ludigman, governor (potestaat) of Friesland
- Huyan Zan, Chinese general of the Song Dynasty
- Ivar of Waterford, Norse Viking king of Dublin
- Jacob ibn Jau, Andalusian-Jewish silk-manufacturer
- Judah ben David Hayyuj, Moroccan-Jewish linguist
- Malfrida, Russian Grand Princess consort of Kiev
- Manfred I, Frankish nobleman (approximate date)
- Masako, Japanese empress consort (b. 950)
- Minamoto no Shigeyuki, Japanese waka poet
- Shahriyar III, Bavand ruler of Tabaristan
- Tyra of Denmark, queen consort of Norway
- Ukhtanes of Sebastia, Armenian historian
