= 1004 =

Calendar year

1004 in various calendars
- Gregorian calendar: 1004; MIV
- Ab urbe condita: 1757
- Armenian calendar: 453; ԹՎ ՆԾԳ
- Assyrian calendar: 5754
- Balinese saka calendar: 925–926
- Bengali calendar: 410–411
- Berber calendar: 1954
- English Regnal year: N/A
- Buddhist calendar: 1548
- Burmese calendar: 366
- Byzantine calendar: 6512–6513
- Chinese calendar: 癸卯年 (Water Rabbit); 3701 or 3494 — to — 甲辰年 (Wood Dragon); 3702 or 3495
- Coptic calendar: 720–721
- Discordian calendar: 2170
- Ethiopian calendar: 996–997
- Hebrew calendar: 4764–4765
- Hindu calendars
- Vikram Samvat: 1060–1061
- Shaka Samvat: 925–926
- Kali Yuga: 4104–4105
- Holocene calendar: 11004
- Igbo calendar: 4–5
- Iranian calendar: 382–383
- Islamic calendar: 394–395
- Japanese calendar: Chōhō 6 / Kankō 1 (寛弘元年)
- Javanese calendar: 906–907
- Julian calendar: 1004; MIV
- Korean calendar: 3337
- Minguo calendar: 908 before ROC 民前908年
- Nanakshahi calendar: −464
- Seleucid era: 1315/1316 AG
- Thai solar calendar: 1546–1547
- Tibetan calendar: ཆུ་མོ་ཡོས་ལོ་ (female Water-Hare); 1130 or 749 or −23 — to — ཤིང་ཕོ་འབྲུག་ལོ་ (male Wood-Dragon); 1131 or 750 or −22

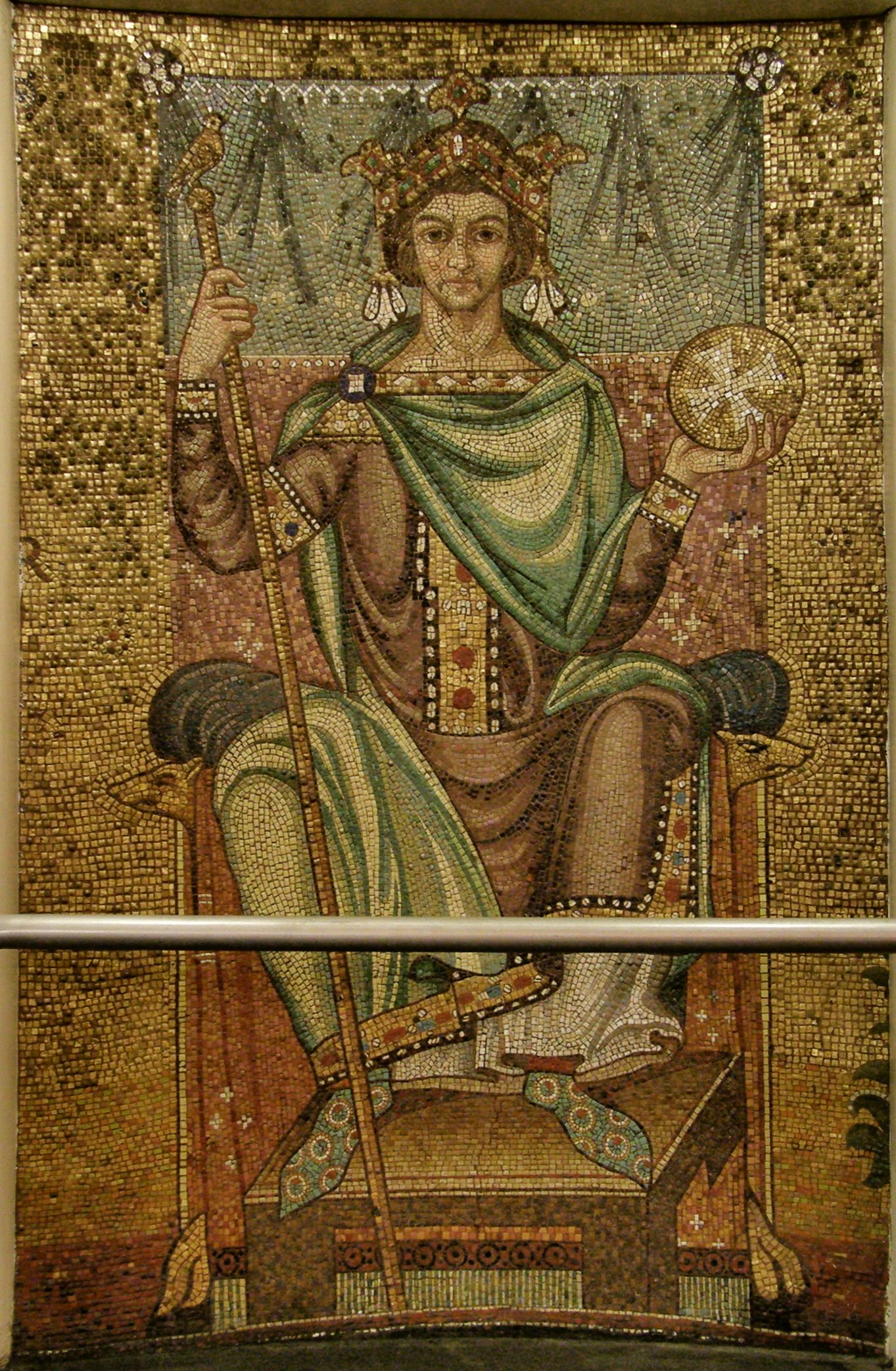
Henry II is crowned King of Italy at Pavia.

Year 1004 (MIV) was a leap year starting on Saturday of the Julian calendar.

== Events ==
=== By place ===
==== Byzantine Empire ====
- Battle of Skopje: Emperor Basil II defeats the Bulgarian forces near Skopje (modern North Macedonia). Leaving his army behind, Samuel of Bulgaria manages to escape. Basil continues his campaign and besieges the fortress of Pernik. By the end of the year Basil has reconquered about half of the Bulgarian Empire.

==== Europe ====
- Spring – King Henry II crosses with an expeditionary force through the Brenner Pass to Trento. After initial military successes against Arduin of Ivrea, he receives the homage of the Italian clergy and Lombard noble families.
- May 14 – Henry II is crowned King of Italy by Archbishop Arnulf II in Pavia. A quarrel ensues between the German troops and the Pavese citizens. Henry orders a massacre of the population in response, destroying the city.
- Fall – Venetian-Byzantine forces defeat the Saracens at Bari. The citadel is on the brink of capitulation after a 3 day siege. Giovanni, a son of Doge Pietro Orseolo II, is married to the Byzantine princess Maria Argyra.
- German–Polish War: Duke Bolesław I of Poland loses Bohemia. With German support, Jaromír occupies Prague and proclaims himself the new duke. At Merseburg, he promises to hold Bohemia as a vassal of Henry II.
- Moorish forces under vizier Abd al-Malik al-Muzaffar sack the Catalan city of Manresa (modern Spain).
- Saracen pirates under the Balearic emir Mugahid sack Pisa, destroying nearly one-quarter of the city.
- Sancho III becomes king of Pamplona, Aragon and Castille (until 1035).

==== England ====
- A Danish Viking fleet under Sweyn Forkbeard lands in Norfolk. Ealdorman Ulfcytel orders his Anglo-Saxon troops to burn the raiding ships. The plan fails and Ulfcytel's small army is defeated by the Vikings.

==== Africa ====
- An episode of plague and famine breaks out in North Africa.

==== Persia ====
- Mahmud of Ghazni invades the Kingdom of Bhatia (modern-day Bhera, Pakistan). He defeats its ruler, Biji Rai, who is captured and subsequently immolates himself.

==== China ====
- Summer – Emperor Sheng Zong of Liao launches a major offensive against the Song dynasty. He invades Shanyang and threatens the Song capital of Kaifeng (approximate date).
- Jingdezhen porcelain enters a period of significant production during the Song dynasty.

==== Japan ====
- December – Fujiwara no Kenshi, the future empress consort, enters the palace as lady-in-waiting to her sister, Empress Shōshi.

=== By topic ===
==== Religion ====
- Spring – Pope John XVIII begins his reign as the 141st pope of the Catholic Church at Rome (until 1009).

== Births ==
- Abdallah ibn Al-Aftas, founder of the Aftasid dynasty (d. 1060)
- Dedi I (or Dedo), margrave of Saxon Ostmark (d. 1075)
- Godgifu, daughter of Æthelred the Unready (approximate date)
- Guido of Acqui (or Wido), Italian bishop (approximate date)
- Minamoto no Takakuni, Japanese nobleman (d. 1077)
- Nasir Khusraw, Persian poet and philosopher (d. 1088)
- William VI ("the Fat"), French nobleman (d. 1038)

== Deaths ==
- June – Frederick, archbishop of Ravenna
- July 11 – Theobald II, French nobleman
- November 4 – Otto I, duke of Carinthia
- November 13 – Abbo of Fleury, French abbot
- Adelaide of Aquitaine, French queen consort
- Aderald, French priest and archdeacon
- Eochaid ua Flannacáin, Irish cleric and poet (b. 935)
- Gisilher (or Giselmar), archbishop of Magdeburg
- Khusrau Shah, king of the Justanids (approximate date)
- Li, empress consort of the Song dynasty (b. 960)
- Li Jiqian, Chinese governor and rebel leader (b. 963)
- Ragnall mac Gofraid, king of the Isles (or 1005)
- Soběslav (or Soběbor), Bohemian nobleman
- Wulfric Spot, English nobleman (approximate date)
