= 1001 =

Calendar year

1001 in various calendars
- Gregorian calendar: 1001; MI
- Ab urbe condita: 1754
- Armenian calendar: 450; ԹՎ ՆԾ
- Assyrian calendar: 5751
- Balinese saka calendar: 922–923
- Bengali calendar: 407–408
- Berber calendar: 1951
- English Regnal year: N/A
- Buddhist calendar: 1545
- Burmese calendar: 363
- Byzantine calendar: 6509–6510
- Chinese calendar: 庚子年 (Metal Rat); 3698 or 3491 — to — 辛丑年 (Metal Ox); 3699 or 3492
- Coptic calendar: 717–718
- Discordian calendar: 2167
- Ethiopian calendar: 993–994
- Hebrew calendar: 4761–4762
- Hindu calendars
- Vikram Samvat: 1057–1058
- Shaka Samvat: 922–923
- Kali Yuga: 4101–4102
- Holocene calendar: 11001
- Igbo calendar: 1–2
- Iranian calendar: 379–380
- Islamic calendar: 391–392
- Japanese calendar: Chōhō 3 (長保３年)
- Javanese calendar: 902–904
- Julian calendar: 1001; MI
- Korean calendar: 3334
- Minguo calendar: 911 before ROC 民前911年
- Nanakshahi calendar: −467
- Seleucid era: 1312/1313 AG
- Thai solar calendar: 1543–1544
- Tibetan calendar: ལྕགས་ཕོ་བྱི་བ་ལོ་ (male Iron-Rat); 1127 or 746 or −26 — to — ལྕགས་མོ་གླང་ལོ་ (female Iron-Ox); 1128 or 747 or −25

1001 (MI) was a common year starting on Wednesday of the Julian calendar, the 1001st year of the Common Era (CE) and Anno Domini (AD) designations, the 1st year of the 2nd millennium and the 11th century, and the 2nd year of the 1000s decade. As of the start of 1001, the Gregorian calendar was 6 days ahead of the Julian calendar, which was the dominant calendar of the time.

== Events ==
=== By place ===
==== Africa ====
- Khazrun ben Falful, from the Maghrawa family Banu Khazrun, begins ruling Tripoli, on the African continent.

==== Asia ====
- March 17 – The Buddhist ruler of Butuan, in the Philippines (P’u-tuan in the Sung Dynasty records), Sari Bata Shaja, makes the first tributary mission to China.
- The Tao/Tayk region is annexed by the Byzantines, as the Theme of Iberia.
- Mahmud of Ghazni, Muslim leader of Ghazni, begins a series of raids into northern India, establishing the Ghaznavid Empire across most of today's Afghanistan, eastern Iran, and Pakistan.
  - November 27 – Battle of Peshawar: Jayapala suffers defeat from the Ghaznavid Empire.
- In Vietnam during the Early Lê dynasty, a rebellion broke out in Cử Long in Thanh Hóa province against king Lê Đại Hành. Former emperor Đinh Phế Đế, who was a general under Đại Hành's reign, died in the battle while suppressing that rebellion.
- Khmer King Jayavarman V is succeeded by Udayadityavarman I, and/or Suryavarman I.
- Construction begins on the Liaodi Pagoda, the tallest pagoda in Chinese history (completed in 1055).
- Japan
  - January 13 – Empress consort Fujiwara no Teishi dies in childbirth.
  - November – The imperial palace is destroyed by fire.
  - 70th birthday and longevity ceremony of Fujiwara no Bokushi (mother-in-law of Fujiwara no Michinaga, grandmother of Empress Shōshi).
  - 40th birthday of Empress dowager Senshi (mother of Emperor Ichijō).

==== Europe ====
- February 6 – After leading the revolt against Emperor Otto III and expelling the Crescentii, Gregory I, Count of Tusculum is named "Head of the Republic".
- July 31 – Emperor Otto III confirms the possessions of Ulric Manfred II of Turin, and grants him privileges.
- July – Sergius II becomes Patriarch of Constantinople.
- Byzantine Emperor Basil II attempts to reconquer Bulgaria.
- Robert II, King of France, marries for the third time, with Constance Taillefer d'Arles.
- Otto III, Holy Roman Emperor has Charlemagne's vault opened at Aachen Cathedral.
- The First Battle of Alton: Danish invaders defeat the English.
- Battle of Pinhoe: Vikings defeat the Anglo-Saxons in Devon.
- Bolesław I the Brave begins ruling parts of Slovakia.
- Bryachislav of Polotsk begins ruling Polotsk.
- Werner I, Bishop of Strasbourg begins ruling the Prince-Bishopric of Strasbourg.
- Ermengol I, Count of Urgell makes his second voyage to Rome.
- Thorgeir Ljosvetningagodi ends being a lawspeaker in Iceland's Althing.
- Ælfgar, bishop of Elmham, is consecrated.
- Æthelred becomes bishop of Cornwall, but dies shortly afterwards.
- The town of Lloret de Mar is founded in Catalonia.
- The first reference is made to Khotyn, Ukrainian town, and to Nyalka, Hungarian village, as to Chimudi.
- Brian Boru attacks the Uí Néill in Ireland.

==== North America ====
- Vikings, led by Leif Erikson, establish small settlements in and around Vinland in North America (approximate date).

=== By topic ===
==== Religion ====
- King Edward the Martyr of England is canonized.
- The Roman Catholic Archdiocese of Esztergom-Budapest is established.
- Oqropiri (Ioane I), Svimeon III and Melkisedek I are Catholicoi of Iberia within one year.
- A tomb of Saint Ivo (possibly) is uncovered in Huntingdonshire, England.

== Births ==
- March 29 – Sokkate, Burmese king (d. 1044)
- Al-Qa'im, Abbasid caliph (d. 1075)
- Duncan I, king of Alba (Scotland) (d. 1040)
- Godwin, English nobleman (d. 1053)
- Herluin de Conteville, Norman nobleman (d. 1066)
- Ingegerd Olofsdotter, Grand Princess of Kiev (d. 1050)

== Deaths ==
- January 13 – Fujiwara no Teishi, empress of Japan (b. 977)
- January 22 – Al-Muqallad ibn al-Musayyab, Uqaylid emir of Mosul
- October 7 – Æthelstan, bishop of Elmham
- December 21 – Hugh, margrave of Tuscany
- Conrad, margrave of Ivrea
- David III of Tao ("the Great"), Georgian prince
- Đinh Phế Đế, Vietnamese emperor (b. 974)
- Ermengarda de Vallespir, Spanish countess
- Izyaslav, Kievan prince of Polotsk
- Ja'far ibn al-Furat, Ikhshidid and Fatimid vizier (b. 921)
- Jayapala, Indian ruler of the Hindu Shahis
- Jayavarman V, emperor of the Khmer Empire
- Wang Yucheng, Chinese official and poet (b. 954)
- Ziri ibn Atiyya, emir of Morocco
