= 1000 =

1000 or thousand may refer to:

- 1000 (number), a natural number

== Vehicles ==
- Ram 1000, a compact pickup truck sold in Colombia, Panama, Peru, and Chile as a rebadged Fiat Toro
- Dodge 1000, a cargo van sold in Mexico as a rebadged Mitsubishi Delica
- Auto Union 1000, a small family car
- Toyota 1000, a subcompact car
- Maruti Suzuki 1000, a sedan
- LRTA 1000 class, a train in the Philippines

== Other uses ==
- 1000 (number), a natural number
- AD 1000, a leap year in the Julian calendar
- 1000 BC, a year of the Before Christ era
- 1000 AM, an AM radio frequency
- 1000 metres, a middle-distance running event
- 1000°, a German electronic dance music magazine
- Thousand (comics), a Marvel Comics character
- "Thousand" (song), by Moby
- The Thousand (I Mille), the volunteers in the Expedition of the Thousand, a military action of the Italian Risorgimento, 1860

== See also ==
- 1.000 (disambiguation)
- 1000s (disambiguation), a decade, century, or millennium
- $1000 (disambiguation), various banknotes
