= 935 =

Calendar year

935 in various calendars
- Gregorian calendar: 935; CMXXXV
- Ab urbe condita: 1688
- Armenian calendar: 384; ԹՎ ՅՁԴ
- Assyrian calendar: 5685
- Balinese saka calendar: 856–857
- Bengali calendar: 341–342
- Berber calendar: 1885
- Buddhist calendar: 1479
- Burmese calendar: 297
- Byzantine calendar: 6443–6444
- Chinese calendar: 甲午年 (Wood Horse); 3632 or 3425 — to — 乙未年 (Wood Goat); 3633 or 3426
- Coptic calendar: 651–652
- Discordian calendar: 2101
- Ethiopian calendar: 927–928
- Hebrew calendar: 4695–4696
- Hindu calendars
- Vikram Samvat: 991–992
- Shaka Samvat: 856–857
- Kali Yuga: 4035–4036
- Holocene calendar: 10935
- Iranian calendar: 313–314
- Islamic calendar: 323–324
- Japanese calendar: Jōhei 5 (承平５年)
- Javanese calendar: 834–835
- Julian calendar: 935; CMXXXV
- Korean calendar: 3268
- Minguo calendar: 977 before ROC 民前977年
- Nanakshahi calendar: −533
- Seleucid era: 1246/1247 AG
- Thai solar calendar: 1477–1478
- Tibetan calendar: ཤིང་ཕོ་རྟ་ལོ་ (male Wood-Horse); 1061 or 680 or −92 — to — ཤིང་མོ་ལུག་ལོ་ (female Wood-Sheep); 1062 or 681 or −91

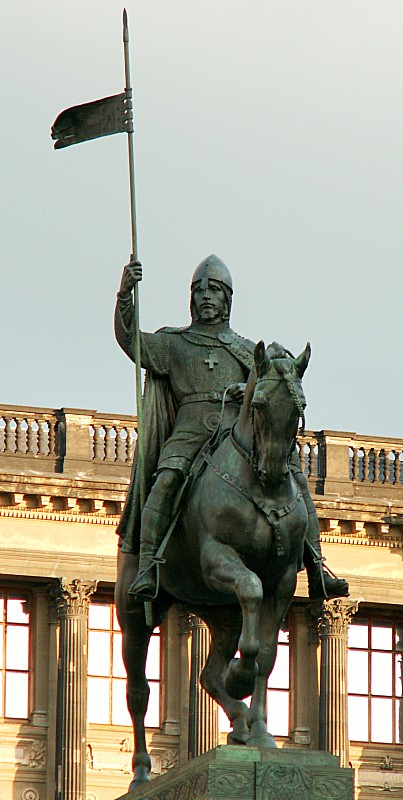
Statue of Duke Wenceslaus I (c. 907–935)

Year 935 (CMXXXV) was a common year starting on Thursday of the Julian calendar.

== Events ==
=== By place ===
==== Europe ====
- Spring – Arnulf I ("the Bad") of Bavaria invades Italy, crossing through the Upper Adige (modern Tyrol). He proceeds towards Verona to join his supporters. King Hugh of Provence takes a Burgundian army against him, and defeats Arnulf at Gossolengo, forcing him to return to Bavaria.
- Summer – Fatimid caliph al-Qa'im dispatches a naval expedition under Ya'qub ibn Ishaq al-Tamimi to raid the coast of Provence and Liguria, sacking Genoa on 16 August and attacking Pisa. Ya'qub also raids Corsica and Sardinia before returning to Mahdia with some 8,000 prisoners.
- September 28 (probable year) – Wenceslaus I, Duke of Bohemia (the subject of the 1853 Christmas carol "Good King Wenceslas") is murdered by a group of nobles led by his brother Boleslaus I ("the Cruel"), who succeeds him.
- Córdoba, capital of Al-Andalus, becomes the largest city of the world, taking the lead from Baghdad, capital of the Abbasid Caliphate.

==== Africa ====
- Summer – Muhammad ibn Tughj al-Ikhshid is appointed governor and becomes the ruler of Egypt and parts of Syria (or the Levant). He launches a campaign against his rival Ahmad ibn Kayghalagh by land and sea: the naval forces take Tinnis and ibn Kayghalagh is forced to retreat. Ibn Tughj enters Fustat, making it his capital, and founds the Ikhshidid dynasty, marking Egypt's independence as an autonomous state.
- Ziri ibn Manad is installed as governor of central Maghreb. He initiates the construction of the fortress of Ashir, near Médéa (modern Algeria). It symbolises the rise of the Zirid dynasty in the Western Mediterranean region.

==== Arabian Empire ====
- January – Emir Mardavij, founder of the Ziyarid dynasty, is murdered by his Turkish slaves. He is succeeded by his brother and general Vushmgir, who is crowned as the new Ziyarid ruler in Rey (modern Iran).

==== Asia ====
- March – King Kyŏn Hwŏn of Later Baekje is overthrown by his eldest son Kyŏn Sin-gŏm (who is crowned on November 15) and put in prison, but he is able to escape.
- November 17 – Wang Yanjun, Emperor Huizong of Min (Ten Kingdoms), is killed in his own palace in an uprising together with his empress consort and several clansmen, and succeeded as second emperor by his son Wang Jipeng.
- King Gyeongsun, the last ruler of Unified Silla, formally surrenders and abdicates in favour of Taejo of Goryeo. This completes Taejo's unification of Korea, bringing the Silla dynasty to an end.
- Ki no Tsurayuki returns to Kyoto from Tosa Province, a journey that becomes the basis of the earliest surviving Japanese poetic diary, called the Tosa Nikki (Tosa Diary).

=== By topic ===
==== Religion ====
- Winter (probable year) – Pope John XI, the son of de facto Roman ruler Marozia, dies at Rome after a four-year reign, aged between 25 and 27.

== Births ==
- Al-Qadi Abd al-Jabbar, Mu'tazilite theologian (d. 1025)
- Eochaid ua Flannacáin, Irish cleric and poet (d. 1004)
- Elvira Ramírez, princess and regent of León (approximate date)
- Folcuin, Frankish abbot of Saint Bertin (approximate date)
- Gao Qiong, Chinese general and governor (jiedushi) (d. 1006)
- Gerard of Toul, German priest and bishop (d. 994)
- Hrosvitha, German canoness and poet (approximate date)
- Michitsuna no Haha, Japanese female poet (d. 995)
- Ukhtanes of Sebastia, Armenian historian (d. 1000)
- Wulfrun, English noblewoman (approximate date)

== Deaths ==
- January 22 – Ma, empress of Southern Han
- January – Mardavij, founder of the Ziyarid dynasty (Iran), assassinated
- September 28 – Wenceslaus I, duke of Bohemia (b. c. 907), assassinated
- October 24 – Li Yu, Chinese official and chancellor
- November 17 – assassination:
  - Wang Yanjun, emperor of Min (Ten Kingdoms)
  - Chen Jinfeng, empress consort of Min (b. 893)
- Dai Siyuan, general of Later Liang (Five Dynasties)
- Govinda IV, ruler of the Rashtrakuta Dynasty (India)
- Gruffydd ab Owain, king of Glywysing (approximate date)
- John XI, pope of the Catholic Church (approximate date)
- Li Yichao, Chinese warlord and governor (jiedushi)
- Niftawayh, Abbasid scholar and grammarian (b. 858)
- Trpimir II, king of Croatia (approximate date)
- Werner V, Frankish nobleman (approximate date)
- Yang Dongqian, Chinese official and chancellor
- Zhao Feng, Chinese official and chancellor
