= 1003 =

Calendar year

1003 in various calendars
- Gregorian calendar: 1003; MIII
- Ab urbe condita: 1756
- Armenian calendar: 452; ԹՎ ՆԾԲ
- Assyrian calendar: 5753
- Balinese saka calendar: 924–925
- Bengali calendar: 409–410
- Berber calendar: 1953
- English Regnal year: N/A
- Buddhist calendar: 1547
- Burmese calendar: 365
- Byzantine calendar: 6511–6512
- Chinese calendar: 壬寅年 (Water Tiger); 3700 or 3493 — to — 癸卯年 (Water Rabbit); 3701 or 3494
- Coptic calendar: 719–720
- Discordian calendar: 2169
- Ethiopian calendar: 995–996
- Hebrew calendar: 4763–4764
- Hindu calendars
- Vikram Samvat: 1059–1060
- Shaka Samvat: 924–925
- Kali Yuga: 4103–4104
- Holocene calendar: 11003
- Igbo calendar: 3–4
- Iranian calendar: 381–382
- Islamic calendar: 393–394
- Japanese calendar: Chōhō 5 (長保５年)
- Javanese calendar: 905–906
- Julian calendar: 1003; MIII
- Korean calendar: 3336
- Minguo calendar: 909 before ROC 民前909年
- Nanakshahi calendar: −465
- Seleucid era: 1314/1315 AG
- Thai solar calendar: 1545–1546
- Tibetan calendar: ཆུ་ཕོ་སྟག་ལོ་ (male Water-Tiger); 1129 or 748 or −24 — to — ཆུ་མོ་ཡོས་ལོ་ (female Water-Hare); 1130 or 749 or −23

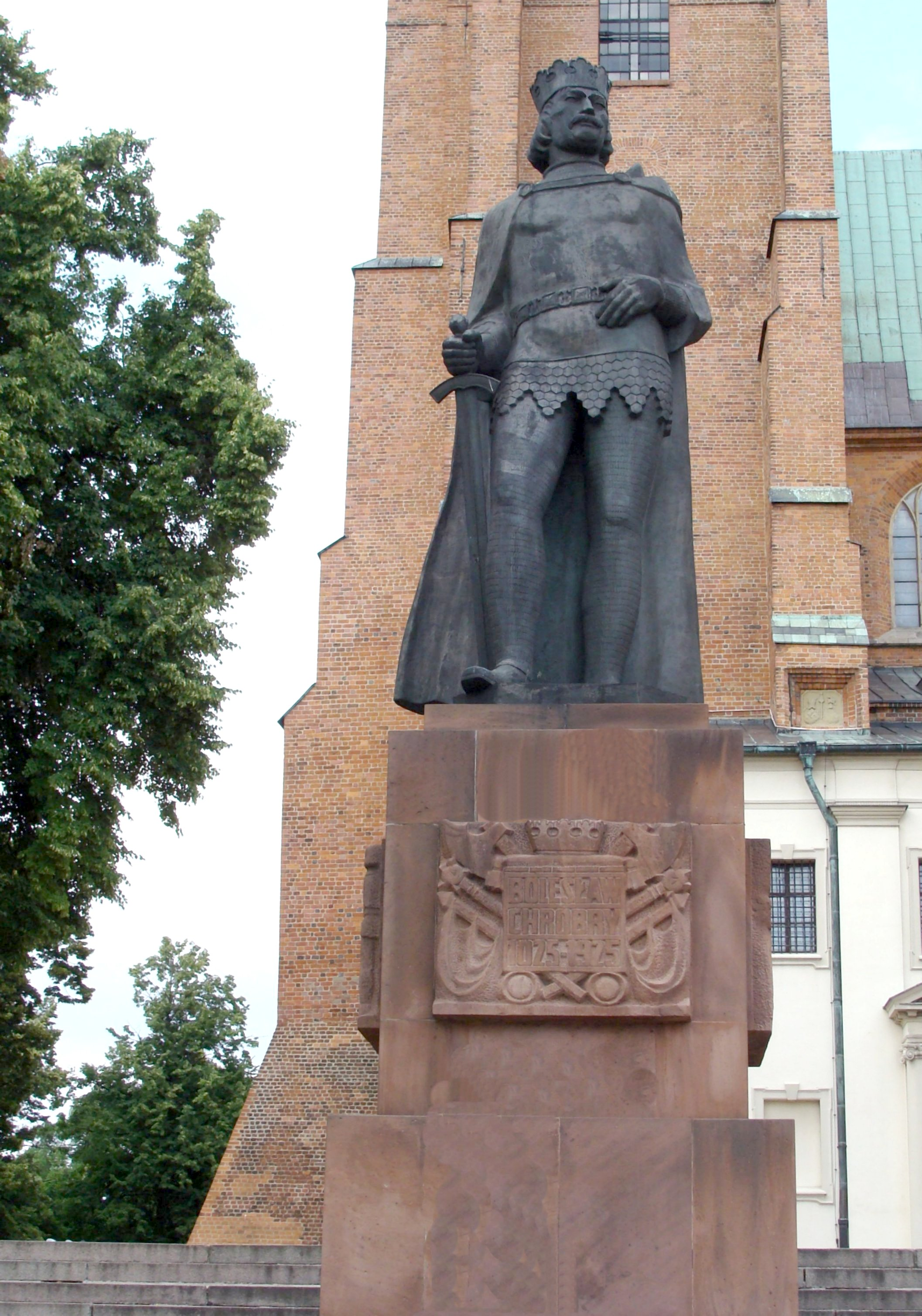
Statue of Bolesław I (the Brave) at Gniezno

Year 1003 (MIII) was a common year starting on Friday of the Julian calendar.

== Events ==
=== By place ===
==== Europe ====
- February 9 – Boleslaus III is restored to authority with armed support from Duke Bolesław I (the Brave) of Poland. The following months, Boleslaus' brothers Jaromír and Oldřich flee to Germany and place themselves under the protection of King Henry II, while Boleslaus orders the massacre of his Bohemian leading nobles at Vyšehrad.
- German–Polish War: Bolesław I annexes Bohemia and parts of Moravia (modern Slovakia). German nobles under Henry of Schweinfurt revolt against Henry II (who has been promised the Duchy of Bavaria).
- Count Oliba (Taillefer) Ripoll. Oliba takes up the Benedictine habit at the Monastery of Santa Maria de Ripoll.
- King Robert II (the Pious) invades Burgundy, but fails. After this fiasco Robert repudiates his second wife, Bertha of Burgundy, and marries Constance of Arles who becomes queen consort of France.
- King Rudolph III of Burgundy invests Humbert I (the White-Handed) with the domains of the Duchy of Aosta. He becomes the first count of the House of Savoy.
- King Stephen I of Hungary invades Transylvania (modern Romania) and establishes the Diocese of Transylvania (approximate date).
- Battle of Albesa: Muslim forces of the Caliphate of Cordoba defeat the northern Christian armies of León, Pamplona and Castile.

==== England ====
- King Sweyn I (Forkbeard) lands with a Danish Viking fleet in East Anglia, ravaging the countryside. Northumbria surrenders to him (approximate date).

==== Asia ====
- Emperor Sheng Zong of the Khitan-led Liao dynasty leads an expedition into Mongolia and subdues the Zubu tribe who are forced to pay an annual tribute.
- Emperor Lê Hoàn of the Anterior Lê dynasty ordered the excavation of the Đa Cái Canal and quelled the rebellions of the Đa Cái people.

=== By topic ===
==== Art ====
- Construction of the Brihadisvara Temple in Tamil Nadu (modern India), during the Chola Dynasty (Early Medieval period).

==== Religion ====
- May 12 – Pope Sylvester II dies after a 4-year pontificate. He is succeeded by John XVII as the 140th pope of the Catholic Church.
- November 6 – John XVII dies after a pontificate of about 7 months and is buried in the Lateran Basilica at Rome.
- Heribert, archbishop of Cologne, founds Deutz Abbey at Deutz (Germany).

== Births ==
- Amatus, bishop of Nusco (approximate date)
- Conrad II (the Younger), duke of Carinthia (d. 1039)
- Edward the Confessor, king of England (d. 1066)
- Frederick, duke of Lower Lorraine (approximate date)
- Hedwig (or Advisa), French princess (approximate date)
- Herleva, Norman noblewoman (approximate date)
- Ibn Hayyus, Syrian poet and panegyrist (d. 1081)
- Ibn Zaydún, Andalusian poet and writer (d. 1071)
- Jing Zong, Chinese emperor of Western Xia (d. 1048)
- Liudolf of Brunswick, margrave of Frisia (d. 1038)
- Musharrif al-Dawla, Buyid emir of Iraq (d. 1025)

== Deaths ==
- January 19 – Kilian of Cologne, Irish abbot
- January 25 – Lothair I, margrave of the Nordmark
- May 4 – Herman II, duke of Swabia (Germany)
- May 12 – Sylvester II, pope of the Catholic Church
- July 11 – Al-Mansur al-Qasim al-Iyyani, Zaidi imam
- August 3 – At-Ta'i, Abbasid caliph of Baghdad (b. 929)
- November 6 – John XVII, pope of the Catholic Church
- December 24 – William II, German nobleman
- December 27 – Emma of Blois, duchess of Aquitaine
- Athanasius the Athonite, Byzantine monk (b. 920)
- Brian mac Maelruanaidh, king of Maigh Seóla (Ireland)
- Didda, queen consort and regent of Kashmir (India)
- Erik the Red, Norse Viking explorer (approximate date)
- Flannchad ua Ruaidíne, abbot of Clonmacnoise
- Gregory of Narek, Armenian theologian (b. 951)
- Gurgen IV, king of Vaspurakan (Armenia)
- Ibrahim ibn Baks, Buyid scholar and physician
- Philotheos, patriarch of Alexandria (Egypt)
- Rozala, French queen and countess of Flanders
- Vladivoj, duke of Bohemia (Czech Republic)
