= $1000 =

There are many $1,000 banknotes or bills, including:

- One of the withdrawn Canadian banknotes
- One of the withdrawn large denominations of United States currency
- One of the banknotes of the Hong Kong dollar
- One of the withdrawn Singapore banknotes
- One of the Fifth series of the New Taiwan Dollar banknote
- One of the banknotes of Zimbabwe

Other currencies that issue $1,000 banknotes or bills are:

- Brunei dollar
- Guyanese dollar
- Jamaican dollar
- Cape Verdean escudo
- Chilean peso
- Colombian peso
- Dominican peso
- Mexican peso
- Uruguayan peso
- Swiss Franc

== See also ==
- 1000 (disambiguation)
- Indian 1000-rupee note (₹1000), a denomination of the Indian rupee first introduced by the Reserve Bank of India in 1938
