= Saint Amatus =

Saint Amatus may refer to:

- Amatus of Remiremont (c. 560 – c. 627), Benedictine abbot and hermit, founder of Remiremont Abbey in northeastern France
- St. Aimé, died 690
- Amatus of Nusco (c. 1003 – 1093), first bishop of Nusco in Irpinia, southern Italy
