= 1000s =

1000s may refer to:

- The millennium from 1 January 1000, to 31 December 1999, almost synonymous with the 2nd millennium (1001–2000)
- The century from 1 January 1000, to 31 December 1099, almost synonymous with the 11th century (1001–1100)
- 1000s (decade), the decade from 1 January 1000, to 31 December 1009, almost synonymous with the 101st decade (1001–1010)

== See also ==
- 1000 (number)
