= Attilanus =

Saint Attilanus
- Venerated in: Catholic Church; Eastern Orthodox Church
- Canonized: 1095 by Pope Urban II

Attilanus (Atilanus, Aragonese: Sant Atilano) (937–1007) was an Aragonese Benedictine and bishop of Zamora. He was prior of Moreruela Abbey.

Saint Atilan (Attilanus), bishop of Zamora (Oct. 5, 10th century). He is credited with renouncing his bishopric and throwing his episcopal ring into the Douro, because the ravages of the Moors in his diocese had rendered his care useless. The ring was later found by a fish in the river, which the saint saw as a divine warning to return to the fold. He was canonized in or about the year 1095.
