= 1025 =

Calendar year

1025 in various calendars
- Gregorian calendar: 1025; MXXV
- Ab urbe condita: 1778
- Armenian calendar: 474; ԹՎ ՆՀԴ
- Assyrian calendar: 5775
- Balinese saka calendar: 946–947
- Bengali calendar: 431–432
- Berber calendar: 1975
- English Regnal year: N/A
- Buddhist calendar: 1569
- Burmese calendar: 387
- Byzantine calendar: 6533–6534
- Chinese calendar: 甲子年 (Wood Rat); 3722 or 3515 — to — 乙丑年 (Wood Ox); 3723 or 3516
- Coptic calendar: 741–742
- Discordian calendar: 2191
- Ethiopian calendar: 1017–1018
- Hebrew calendar: 4785–4786
- Hindu calendars
- Vikram Samvat: 1081–1082
- Shaka Samvat: 946–947
- Kali Yuga: 4125–4126
- Holocene calendar: 11025
- Igbo calendar: 25–26
- Iranian calendar: 403–404
- Islamic calendar: 415–416
- Japanese calendar: Manju 2 (万寿２年)
- Javanese calendar: 927–928
- Julian calendar: 1025; MXXV
- Korean calendar: 3358
- Minguo calendar: 887 before ROC 民前887年
- Nanakshahi calendar: −443
- Seleucid era: 1336/1337 AG
- Thai solar calendar: 1567–1568
- Tibetan calendar: ཤིང་ཕོ་བྱི་བ་ལོ་ (male Wood-Rat); 1151 or 770 or −2 — to — ཤིང་མོ་གླང་ལོ་ (female Wood-Ox); 1152 or 771 or −1

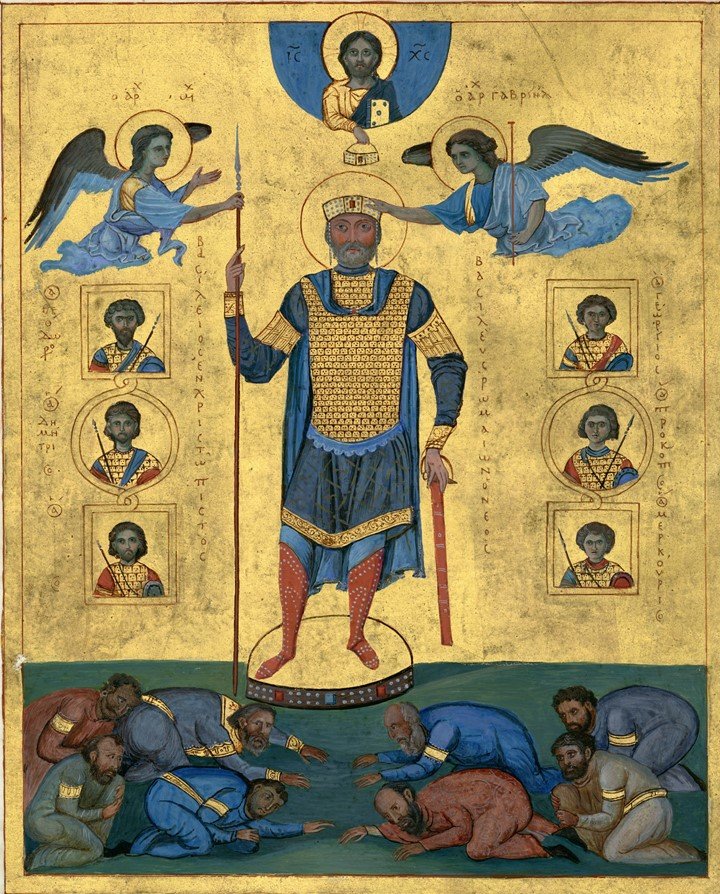
Emperor Basil II ("the Bulgar Slayer")

Year 1025 (MXXV) was a common year starting on Friday of the Julian calendar.

== Events ==
- January 21 – Chifuru, daughter of powerful Japanese court official Fujiwara no Sanesuke (rival of Fujiwara no Michinaga) has her mogi ceremony. Sanesuke wants to make his daughter an imperial consort which causes the dislike of Empress Ishi (daughter of Michinaga) – eventually Kampaku (Regent) Fujiwara no Yorimichi prevents it. ^{[Unclear significance]}
- February 25 – (23 Dhu l-Hijja 415 AH) In the Fatimid Caliphate, Badr al-Dawla Nafidh leads a group of Egyptian soldiers and white slave soldiers from Cairo to end a black slave rebellion in the famine-stricken Egyptian capital, Fustat.
- February – In what was the Kingdom of Israel, Fath al-Qal'i, the Fatimid Governor of Jerusalem, and Anushtakin al-Dizbari, the Governor of Palestine, make a successful assault on Ramla against Hassan ibn Mufarrij al-Jarrah, the leader of the Jarrahids of Syria.
- March 6 – In the Duchy of Aquitaine in France, the Aquitanian barons and prelates meet at Maillezais, to discuss the claims by William the Fat, son of the Duke of Aquitaine Guillaume le Grand (William the Great) to rule the vacant throne of the Kingdom of Italy (primarily Lombardy and Tuscany) within the Holy Roman Empire. The title is eventually claimed by Conrad the Salic.
- March 7 – Count Herbert I of Maine, is imprisoned at Saintes after being lured there by Count Fulk III of Anjou, who had promised to reward Herbert with control of Saintes. Herbert is held captive for two years before other nobles force his release.
- April 18 – Bolesław I the Brave is crowned in Gniezno as the first King of Poland. He takes advantage of the interregnum in Germany (see 1024) and receives permission for his coronation from Pope John XIX; however, he dies 60 days later.
- May – Ishoyahb IV, the unpopular Nicene Christian Patriarch of the Church of the East, dies in Baghdad after a five-year reign, leaving a vacancy that will not be filled until 1028.
- June 17 – Mieszko II Lambert becomes the second King of Poland after the sudden death of his father, King Bolesław I the Brave
- September – At the urging of Queen Constance of Arles, the three sons of King Robert II of France ("the Pious") revolt against their father – Hugh Magnus (heir and co-king), Henry I and Robert I, Duke of Burgundy start a civil war over power.
- December 15 – Byzantine Emperor Basil II ("Bulgar Slayer") dies in Constantinople after a 50-year reign. Never married, he is succeeded by his brother and co-emperor Constantine VIII, who becomes sole ruler of the Byzantine Empire. Constantine calls the Sicilian invasion off. Catapan Basil Boioannes diverts the Byzantine expeditionary force already assembled on Calabria, to join the siege of Capua.
- December 25 – Mieszko II Lambert, son of Bolosław I, is formally crowned as king of Poland by the Archbishop Hippolytus in Gniezno Cathedral.

=== By place ===
==== Africa ====
- Emir Al-Mu'izz ibn Badis of the Zirid dynasty in Ifriqiya (modern Tunisia) attempts to retake Sicily but is unsuccessful.

==== Asia ====
- Srivijaya, a Buddhist kingdom based in Sumatra, is attacked by Emperor Rajendra I of the Chola dynasty of southern India in a dispute over trading rights in Southeast Asia. It survives but declines in importance. And the tamil chola led ayyavole 500 merchants took full power in south east asia and the chola influence of south east asia thereafter began.
- Completion and publishing of Avicenna's Canon of Medicine.
- Japanese Kampaku (Regent) Fujiwara no Yorimichi holds horse racing at his mansion; the emperor attends. ^{[Unclear significance]}

==== Europe ====
- February – In what was the Kingdom of Israel, Fath al-Qal'i, the Fatimid Governor of Jerusalem, and Anushtakin al-Dizbari, the Governor of Palestine, make a successful assault on Ramla against Hassan ibn Mufarrij al-Jarrah, the leader of the Jarrahids of Syria.
- February 25 – (23 Dhu l-Hijja 415 AH) In the Fatimid Caliphate, Badr al-Dawla Nafidh leads a group of Egyptian soldiers and white slave soldiers from Cairo to end a black slave rebellion in the famine-stricken Egyptian capital, Fustat.
- December 15 – Byzantine Emperor Basil II ("Bulgar Slayer") dies in Constantinople after a 50-year reign. Never married, he is succeeded by his brother and co-emperor Constantine VIII, who becomes sole ruler of the Byzantine Empire. Constantine calls the Sicilian invasion off. Catapan Basil Boioannes and diverts the Byzantine expeditionary force already assembled on Calabria, to join the siege of Capua
- December 25 – Mieszko II Lambert, son of Bolosław I, is formally crowned as king of Poland by the Archbishop Hippolytus in Gniezno Cathedral.

== Births ==
- August 28 – Go-Reizei, Japanese emperor (d. 1068)
- Agnes of Poitou, Holy Roman Empress (d. 1077)
- Anna Dalassene, Byzantine empress and regent
- Edith of Wessex, English queen (approximate date)
- Elisaveta Yaroslavna of Kiev, Norwegian queen
- Gerald of Sauve-Majeure, French abbot (d. 1095)
- Gertrude of Poland, Grand Princess of Kiev (d. 1108)
- John Italus, Byzantine philosopher (d. 1090)
- John of Lodi, Italian hermit and bishop (d. 1106)
- Lothair Udo II, German margrave (d. 1082)
- Nong Zhigao, Vietnamese chieftain of Nong
- Ruben I, Armenian prince (approximate date)
- Rudolf of Rheinfelden, duke of Swabia (d. 1080)
- Simon I, French nobleman (approximate date)
- Tora Torbergsdatter, Norwegian Viking queen
- William VIII of Aquitaine, French nobleman (approximate date)

== Deaths ==
- April 25 – Fujiwara no Seishi, Japanese empress consort (b. 972)
- May – Musharrif al-Dawla, Buyid emir of Iraq (b. 1003)
- June 17 – Bolesław I the Brave, king of Poland (b. 967)
- August 10 – Burchard of Worms, German bishop and writer
- August 11 – Kanshi, Japanese princess consort
- c. August 30 – Fujiwara no Kishi, Japanese crown princess, posthumously named empress, mother of Emperor Go-Reizei (b. 1007)
- September 17 – Hugh Magnus, king of France (b. 1007)
- September 29 – Louis I, count of Chiny and Verdun
- November
  - Koshikibu no Naishi, Japanese waka poet and lady-in-waiting (b. c.999)
  - Matilda, countess palatine of Lotharingia (b. 979)
- December 15 – Basil II, Byzantine emperor (b. 958)
- December 22 – Wang Qinruo, Chinese chancellor
- December – Eustathius of Constantinople, Byzantine patriarch
- Al-Qadi Abd al-Jabbar ibn Ahmad, Muslim theologian (b. 935)
- Mhic Mac Comhaltan Ua Cleirigh, Irish king
- Sabur ibn Ardashir, Persian statesman (b. 942)
- Watanabe no Tsuna, Japanese samurai (b. 953)
