= Maghrawa =

Maghrawa may refer to:

- Maghrawa (tribe), a tribal confederation
- Maghrawa (Tunisia), an archeological site
