= First Battle of Alton =

Skirmish in 1001 between the English and the Vikings

Coordinates: 51.151°N 0.975°W

The First Battle of Alton was a skirmish in 1001 between the English and the Vikings. According to the Anglo-Saxon Chronicle it took place at somewhere called, in Old English, Æthelingadene. Traditionally, the site was believed to have been what is now Alton, Hampshire. However, it is thought more likely to have been in the East and West Dean area of modern-day West Sussex.

== Causes ==
Between 991 and 1005 Danish attacks on England escalated from small isolated raids to massed attacks by larger forces. The Danes ravaged the countryside, demanding huge tributes (Danegeld) from Æthelred, the Anglo-Saxon king. However, the attacks continued and their plunder and pillage tactics, combined with a rapid march strategy brought them as far as Æthelingadene.

== The battle ==
It began with the arrival of the Viking fleet off the Sussex coast, which then proceeded to "Æthelingadene", where the men of Hampshire united to fight against them. An indication of the severity of the English casualty list is given by the Anglo-Saxon Chronicle that cites the total English losses as 81, it included two high-reeves and three thegns, this was compared, to 'a much greater number' lost by the Danes. However, the Danes managed to win the field and advance further west, while the Anglo-Saxons retreated to Winchester.

== Consequences ==
The First Battle of Alton failed to stop the Danish Army. It attacked Devon, burning many towns such as Teignton, until the area surrendered. The advance continued towards Exmouth, until it reached Pin-hoo, where the high-steward of the king, Cole, and Edsy, the reeve of the king once again raised an army against it at the Battle of Pinhoe. Again the Danes prevailed and burned 'many goodly towns that we cannot name'. Here they turned eastwards and reached the Isle of Wight, until the people there made peace with them.

In the year 1006, Æthelred was forced to make a permanent peace with the hostile force, and gave them a tribute of 30,000 pounds. In 1008, he gave the order to build ships, triggering a huge naval force to be made. By 1009, this fleet was ready, and was sent to Sandwich to defend the land against attacking forces.

== Placename ==
The Anglo-Saxon Chronicle records the battle as being at Æthelingadene. Ætheling is the Old English for Prince, Ingas is a settlement of people associated with a common leader and Dene is derived from denu the name for valley. Therefore, the place-name Æthelinga-dene refers to the valley associated with Æthelings and it has been suggested that Dene (now East and West Dean, West Sussex) was probably where Queen Ælfthryth brought up her grandchildren, the sons of Æthelred, who had the title ætheling.

== Sources ==
- Bately, J.M., ed. (1986). The Anglo-Saxon Chronicle: A Collaborative Edition. Volume 3 MS A. Cambridge: D.S.Brewer. ISBN 978-0-85991-103-0.
- Brandon, Peter, ed. (1978). The South Saxons. Chichester: Phillimore. ISBN 0-85033-240-0.
- Gelling, Margaret; Coles, Anne (2000). The Landscape of Place-Names. Stamford: Tyas. ISBN 1-900289-26-1.
- Cox, B. (2014). "-ingas, -inga Names". In Lapidge, Michael; Blair, John; Keynes, Simon; Scragg, Donald (eds.). The Wiley Blackwell Encyclopedia of Anglo-Saxon England (2nd ed.). Chichester, West Sussex: Wiley Blackwell. p. 257. ISBN 978-0-470-65632-7.
- Kendrick, T.D. (1930), A History of the Vikings, New York: Charles Scribner & Sons
- Miller, Sean (2014). "Ætheling". In Lapidge, Michael; Blair, John; Keynes, Simon; Scragg, Donald (eds.). The Wiley Blackwell Encyclopedia of Anglo-Saxon England (2nd ed.). Chichester, West Sussex: Wiley Blackwell. p. 15. ISBN 978-0-470-65632-7.
- Williams, Ann (2003). Æthelred the Unready: The Ill-Counselled King. Hambledon: Hambledon Continuum. ISBN 1-85285-382-4.
