= Arnulf II (archbishop of Milan) =

Arnulf II (died 25 February 1018, in Milan) was Archbishop of Milan from 998 to 1018.

He descended from the noble family of Arsago, being the son of Dagibert of Arsago. Among his brothers, Landulf of Arsago was Bishop of Brescia and Lanfrank of Arsago was the grandfather on the mother's side of Anselm of Besate.

In 1001, Otto III, Holy Roman Emperor, at the time living in Rome, sent him to Byzantium to take a Byzantine princess as his future wife and empress. However Arnulf II, on his journey back to Rome, was reached by the news of the emperor's death.

When Arduin of Ivrea, in lieu of Henry of Saxony (the future Henry II, Holy Roman Emperor), the dynastic successor of Otto III, was elected King of Italy and crowned in Pavia, the traditional site of the crowning of the Lombard and Italian kings, Arnulf II stood on the side of Henry. After the defeat of Arduin of Ivrea, Arnulf II went to Pavia to crown Henry of Saxony, on 15 May 1004, the new King of Italy.
