= Egbert of Fulda =

Abbot of Fulda Abbey, Germany (c. 1000–1058)

Egbert (c. 1000–1058) was abbot of Fulda Abbey, a Benedictine abbey in Fulda, Germany.

Born around 1000, probably to a Hessian-Thuringian noble family, he was possibly educated in the Benedictine Hersfeld Abbey, in Hesse. Certainly from 1046 he was a monk there, and that year was appointed abbot of Tegernsee Abbey, in Bavaria; in 1047 he also became abbot of Ebersberg Abbey. When Henry III, Holy Roman Emperor, was in Fulda, toward the end of 1047, then-abbot Rohing died, and Henry had the monks choose Egbert as their new abbot. He was confirmed as abbot by Henry in 1049, and later that year was granted a confirmation of the Fulda exemption, as a weapon in the ongoing struggle for power (and Fulda's independence) with the Bishopric of Würzburg.

To strengthen the claims, he had a new vita written of Saint Boniface, on whose orders Fulda Abbey had been built in 744, and engaged Otloh of Sankt Emmeram to write it. In Regensburg, Otloh had managed to pick up a copy of the so-called Karlsruhe Codex of the Boniface correspondence, which Egbert had ordered and sent to Pope Leo IX (Leo was interested in rewriting the saint's vita but died before he had the chance). The exemption for Fulda was again confirmed by Henry III in 1056.

Abbot Egbert was known for having enlarged the possessions of Fulda, and for his zeal in building. In 1048 he had new sleeping quarters built for the monks. He rebuilt the neglected collegiate church on the nearby Frauenberg, just north of Fulda, into the Benedictine abbey of Frauenberg, ca. 1050. He died 17 November 1058.
