= Fantinus =

Italian saint (c. 927–1000)

Saint Fantinus
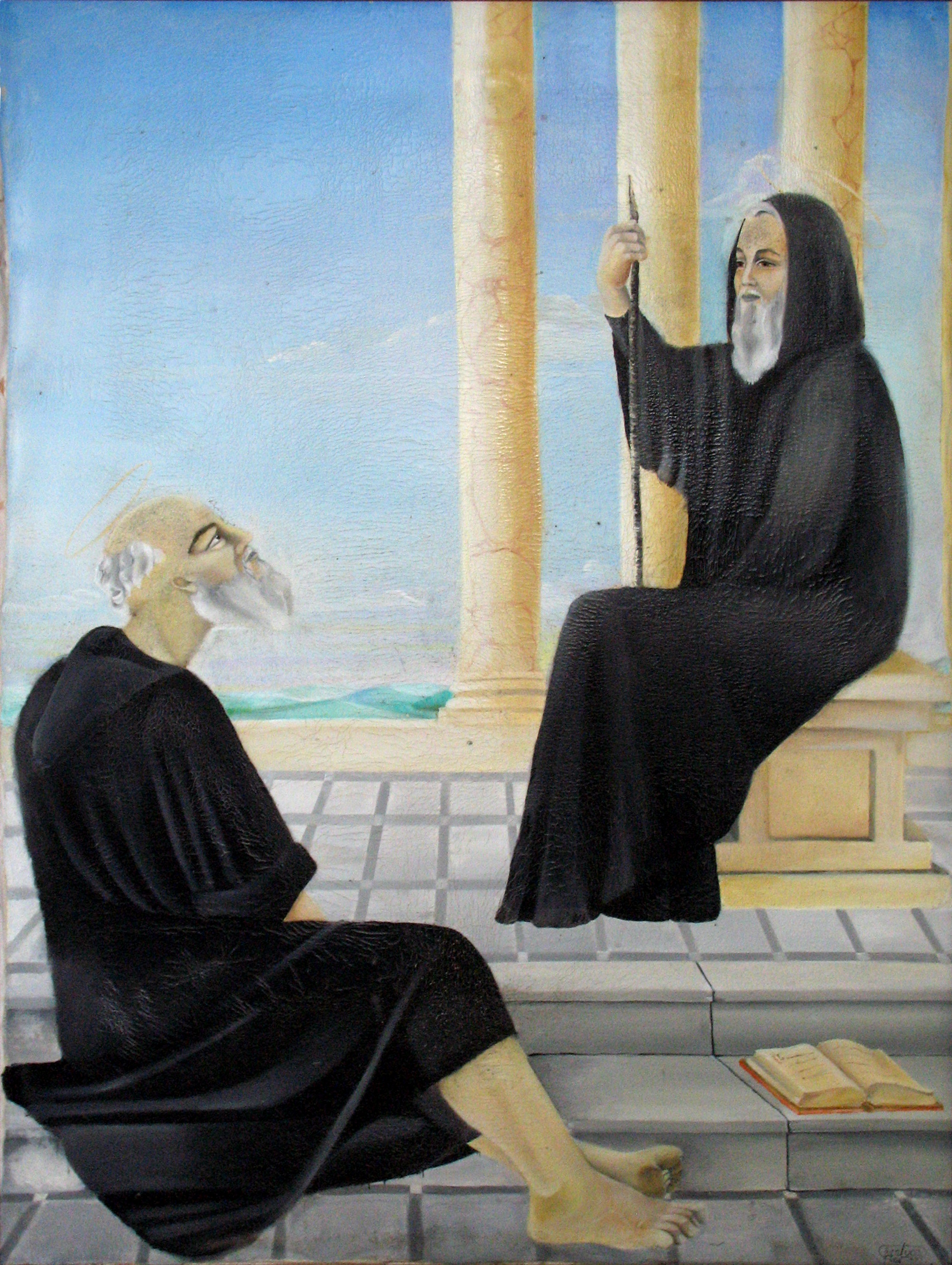
- Painting of Saint Fantinus (on the right). Sanctuary of San Nicodemo, Mammola.
- Born: c. 927; Calabria
- Died: 1000; Greece
- Venerated in: Roman Catholic Church, Eastern Orthodox Church
- Feast: August 30

Fantinus (Italian: Fantino) (c. 927–1000) was an Italian saint. He is sometimes called Fantinus of Calabria or Fantinus the Younger (Fantino il Giovane) to distinguish him from Fantinus the Wonderworker (or the Elder), an earlier Calabrian saint.

Born in Calabria in a locality described as being the "closest to Sicily", Fantinus was introduced as a child to Saint Elias the Cave-Dweller. Fantinus' parents were named George and Vriena. Fantinus' spiritual education was entrusted to Elias, and Fantinus became a monk at the age of thirteen and worked as a cook and afterwards as a porter. At the age of thirty-three, he became a hermit in the region of Mount Mercurion in the north of Calabria. There, many monasteries and hermitages had been established under the Basilian rule. Fantinus lived a life of extreme asceticism, eating only raw vegetables, and occupying his time copying manuscripts. He also experienced a vision of heaven and hell.

Fantinus lived both as a hermit and as a monk and abbot. He subsequently convinced his aged parents, as well as his two brothers, Luke and Cosmas, and sister Caterina, to enter the monastic life. When he became a hermit, he left his brother Lucas in charge of the monastery for men he had founded. Though a hermit, he often returned from the wild in order to serve as a guide and spiritual teacher to disciples, such as Nilus the Younger and Nicodemus of Mammola.

== Greece ==
The monastery he founded was destroyed by Muslim raiders during Fantinus' lifetime. But Fantinus was told by an angel to preach in Greece. He left Calabria with two disciples, Vitalis and Nicephorus. During the voyage, the ship ran out of drinking water. Fantinus is said to have made the sign of the cross over a container filled with seawater and miraculously converted it into drinkable water. Fantinus visited Corinth, Athens, and Larissa, where he lived near the sepulcher of Saint Achillius of Larissa. He lived for four months in a monastery dedicated to Saint Menas near Thessalonica, and then lived outside of the city walls of that city. In Thessalonica itself, he cured the sick and caused a corrupt judge to repent of his sins. He was also given credit for preventing a Bulgarian capture of the city.

Fantinus died in Greece.

The eleventh-century Greek life of Fantinus has been edited and translated into Italian by Enrica Follieri.
