= Ichimonjiya Wasuke =

Japanese confectionery maker

The shop's building in 2017

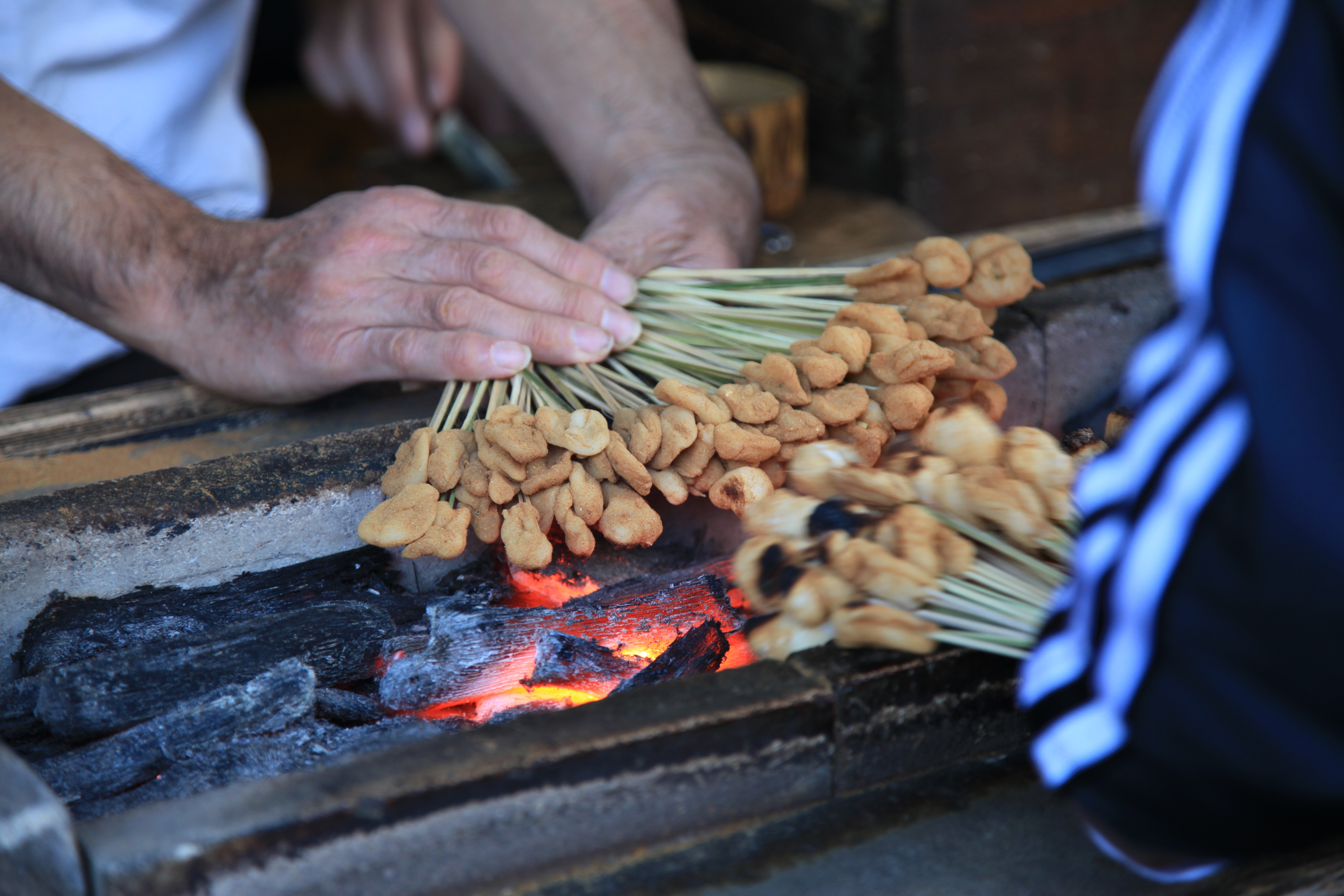
The shop's aburi-mochi being roasted over a fire.

Ichimonjiya Wasuke (Japanese: 一文字屋和輔), also known by locals as Ichiwa, is a traditional confectionery company located in Kita-ku, Kyoto, Japan. Founded in 1000 AD, it is considered to be the oldest sweet shop in the world. The company primarily produces traditional Japanese sweets, known as wagashi, but also sell aburi-mochi, a variant of mochi that is roasted over a fire.

== History ==
The company was founded in 1000 AD when it started producing rice cake for the adjacent Imamiya Shrine for their offerings to the gods. After being used in the rituals, the rice cake would be cooked on bamboo skewers and sold to shrine-goers. The shop has been owned by the Hasegawa family for approximately 25 generations.

Over the centuries there have been minor changes made in concessions to adjust to modernity. The water used for the mochi was originally sourced from a small spring in the shop's cellar, however this was changed after local health officials prohibited the use of well water. They now use a mochi machine to mechanically pound rice. After World War II they moved from charging on the honor system to a fixed price per plate.

== Products ==
The restaurant produces and sells wagashi, traditional Japanese confections often served with tea, namely:

- aburi-mochi (or "aburimochi")- roasted rice cake in a sweet miso sauce
- green tea, etc.

== See also ==
- List of oldest companies
