= Ibrahim ibn Baks =

Baghdadii medieval physician

Ibrahim ibn Baks (Arabic: إبراهيم بن بكس; died in 1003 CE) was a physician and a regular lecturer in Al-'Adudi Hospital, a bimaristan located in Baghdad during the Islamic Golden Age. He became blind towards the end of his life.

According to Ibn Abi Usaibi'a, Ibn Baks translated many works into the Arabic-language.

== Works ==
Among his works are a large and a small compendium of medicine and monographs on diseases of the skin, of the eyes, on anatomy and on antidotes. His works include:

- كناشه كتاب الأقراباذين
- مقالة في الجدري
