= Gao Qiong =

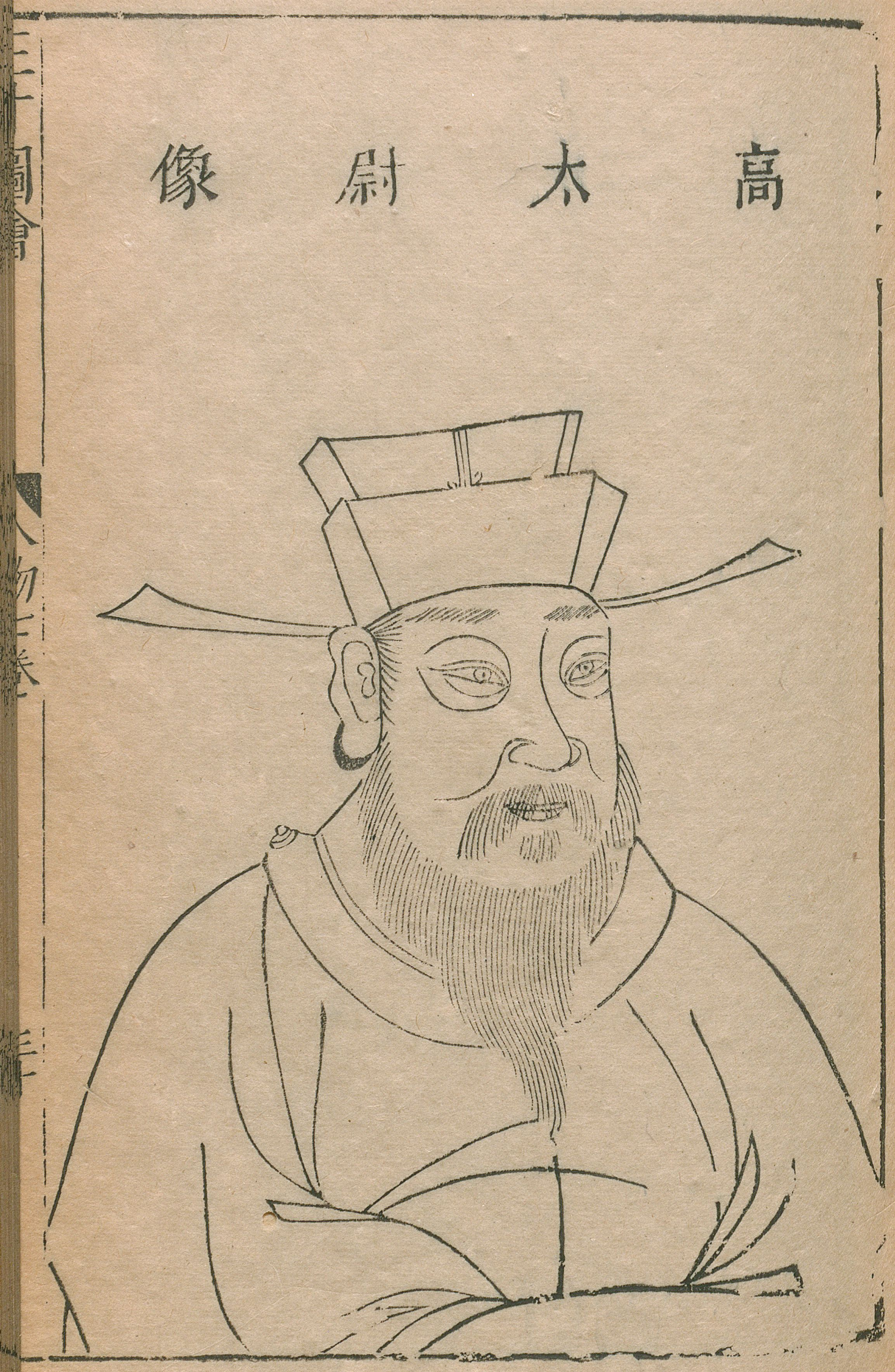
Gao Qiong

Gao Qiong (Chinese: 高瓊, 935 – 26 December 1006) was a Northern Song dynasty general and Zhong-Wu military governor. Gao conducted many military exploits.

== Experience ==
Gao Qiong was born in Bozhou Mengcheng (now Anhui Mengcheng County). His ancestry was from Yan, dating back to the Five Dynasties period. Gao Qiong was a robber in his childhood, he was arrested and was supposed to be beheaded at the Meridian Gate. During the torrential summer rain, when guards were slack, Gao Qiong latched off nail and escaped. Later he joined the troop of Wang Qi, a general of Hou Zhou dynasty. Gao gained the levy over the Southern Tang exploits.

In 1004, Dowager Empress Xiao Yanyan sent two hundred thousand warriors to attack Northern Song dynasty. Gao Qiong played an important role in helping Emperor Zhenzong to arrive in the battlefront which Song and Liao confront each other. Later he was involved in the Chanyuan Treaty.

From then on he got the trust of the Emperor Zhenzong and had a high prestige that his family took the relation with the royal family of Song. His granddaughter was conferred as the Empress Gao. Gao Qiong cannot read, but he often told his sons: Do not rely on their parents for shelter achievements, but to study hard in order to achieve personal excellence.
