= Maria Argyropoulina =

Great-granddaughter of the Byzantine emperor Romanos I Lakapenos

Maria Argyra (also Argyre or Argyropoulina) (Greek: Μαρία Ἀργυρή or Ἀργυροπουλίνα; died 1006 or 1007), of the Argyros family, was the great-granddaughter of the Byzantine emperor Romanos I Lakapenos, cousin of the emperors Basil II and Constantine VIII, and sister to the Byzantine emperor Romanos III Argyros.

In the Chronicon Venetum by John the Deacon, it is mentioned that Maria was the daughter of a noble patrician, called Argyropoulos, who was a descendant of the imperial family. This information is confirmed by the chronicle of Andrea Dandolo, who says that she was the niece of the emperor Basil II. More precisely, she was the sister of the future emperor Romanos III Argyros and the daughter of (Marianos?) Argyros, the son of Romanos Argyros and Agathe, daughter of the emperor Romanos I Lakapenos. This made her the second cousin of the emperors Basil II and Constantine VIII, likewise great-grandchildren of Romanos I, through another of his daughters, Helene.

In 1004 Maria was married to Giovanni Orseolo, the son of the Doge of Venice Pietro II Orseolo. The marriage was celebrated in the imperial chapel of Constantinople with full imperial pageantry – the couple was blessed by the patriarch, golden wedding crowns were placed on their heads by the two emperors Basil II and Constantine VIII and there followed three days of festivities in one of the palaces called Yconomium. Maria brought to her husband great dowry, including a palace in the imperial capital, where they lived after the wedding. Basil also honored Maria's husband with the title of patrician.

Before they left Constantinople, Maria Argyra was already pregnant and begged the emperor for pieces of the holy relics of Saint Barbara, which were brought to Venice by her. Maria Argyre and Giovanni Orseolo had a son, Basilio, who was named after his uncle, Maria's brother Basileios Argyros-Mesardonites or Emperor Basil II, or both.

In 1006 or 1007 Maria, along with her husband and son, died when plague swept through the city-state.

Half a century after her death, she was criticised by Peter Damian for her use of a fork for eating (forks being unfamiliar in Western Europe at the time), perfumes, and dew for bathing, although these criticisms were later mistakenly believed to be aimed at another Byzantine princess, the dogaressa Theodora Doukaina.

== Sources ==
- Tapkova-Zaimova, Vasilka (2009). "Balgari rodom": komitopulite v letopisnata i istoriografskata traditsiya (in Bulgarian) (1. izd. ed.). Veliko Tarnovo: Univ. Izdat. "Sv. Sv. Kiril i Metodiy". p. 119. ISBN 9789545246845.
- Tăpkova-Zaimova, Vasilka (2017). "CHAPTER 5 Latin, French and Italian Sources". Bulgarians by Birth : The Comitopuls, Emperor Samuel and Their Successors According to Historical Sources and the Historiographic Tradition. Translated by Pavel Murdzhev. Leiden: Brill. p. 155. doi:10.1163/9789004352995_007. ISBN 978-90-04-35299-5. ISSN 1872-8103.
- Kaldellis, Anthony (2017) Streams of Gold, Rivers of Blood: The Rise and Fall of Byzantium, 955 A.D. to the First Crusade, Oxford.
- Nicol, Donald MacGillivray (1992) [1988]. Byzantium and Venice: A Study in Diplomatic and Cultural Relations. Cambridge University Press. pp. 44–47. ISBN 0521428947.
- Norwich, John Julius (1991) Byzantium: The Apogee, London: BCA.
