= Nyalka =

- Flag Coat of arms

- Location of Győr-Moson-Sopron county in Hungary

- Location of Nyalka
- Coordinates: 47.54511°N 17.80924°E
- Country: Hungary
- County: Győr-Moson-Sopron

Area
  - Total: 12.86 km^{2} (4.97 sq mi)

Population (2004)
  - Total: 460
  - Density: 35.76/km^{2} (92.6/sq mi)
- Time zone: UTC+1 (CET)
  - Summer (DST): UTC+2 (CEST)
- Postal code: 9096
- Area code: 96

Nyalka is a village in Győr-Moson-Sopron county, Hungary.

Nyalka was first mentioned in 1001 as Chimudi. King Ladislaus I donated it to the Benedictine Abbey of Pannonhalma. During the Ottoman invasion, the Esterházy and Cseszneky families also had noble estates in the village. The Turks destroyed the village, but after 1680 was repopulated by Hungarian serfs.
