= Flannchad ua Ruaidíne =

Irish abbot (died 1003)

Flannchad ua Ruaidine (died 1003) was the 53rd Abbot of Clonmacnoise.

Flannchad was a member of the Corco Moga people, who had by his time been conquered by the Ui Diarmata. The Corco Moga were natives of what is now the parish of Kilkerrin in north-east County Galway.

Details on Flannchad's term are few; he succeeded the previous abbot, who was deposed, in 1002.
