= Jacob ibn Jau =

Jacob ibn Jau (Hebrew Ya'akov ben Gau; Arab. Yakub ibn Jau) was a Jewish silk-manufacturer at Cordova, occupying a high position at the court of the Umayyad Caliph Hisham II. He died about 1000. Amador de los Ríos calls him "Ibn Gan."

Jacob and his brother Joseph ibn Jau, finding in the court of the palace a large sum of money which had been lost by some Moors from the province during an assault upon them, resolved to use the money for presents for the caliph and the "hajib" al-Mansur ibn Abi Amir, to gain favor thereby. They accordingly manufactured precious silks for garments, and flags with artistically woven Arabic mottos and emblems, the like of which had never been seen in al-Andalus, and presented them to the caliph and the powerful hajib. Al-Mansur thereupon made Jacob prince and chief judge of all the Jewish communities of the Andalusian caliphate, investing him with the right of appointing judges and rabbis, and of determining the taxes which the Jews were to pay to the state.

Jacob was also invested with princely splendors; eighteen pages in gold-brocaded garments formed his guard of honor, and a state carriage was always at his disposal. The community of Cordova unanimously recognized him as its chief and granted him the right of entailing his dignities upon his descendants. In the dispute regarding the rabbinate of Cordova, Jacob and his family were on the side of Joseph ibn Abitur. Jacob deposed Rabbi Hanoch, and called in his place ibn Abitur, who was then staying in the Maghreb. Ibn Abitur, however, refused the rabbinate out of respect for the learned and pious Hanoch. Jacob ibn Jau retained his position only a short time, for Al-Mansur, disappointed because Jacob would not extort large sums of money from his coreligionists as presents for him, cast Jacob into prison. After languishing there for a year Jacob was liberated through the intervention of the caliph himself, and reinstated, without, however, regaining his former prestige. Isaac ibn Saul, and Isaac ben Gikatilla of Elisana (Lucena) praised him in enthusiastic verses.
