= Frederick (archbishop of Ravenna) =

Frederick (died June 1004) was the Archbishop of Ravenna briefly from 1002 to 1004.

Frederick, a Saxon, first appears as a collaborator of the Emperor Otto III in 1000, when he was present at the reconsecration of Pomposa Abbey in Ravenna. In April 1001 he was appointed a presbyter and a cardinal. In June 1002 he was sent as an imperial legate to the Synod of Pöhlde to mediate between the claims of Bernard, Bishop of Hildesheim, and Willigis, Archbishop of Mainz, concerning the control of the abbey of Gandersheim. In the fall of that year he was elected Archbishop of Ravenna (before 22 November). On 27 December 1002 he was acting metropolitan at the Second Council of Todi.

In 1004 Frederick supported Henry II of Germany for the Iron Crown of Lombardy, while the magnates elected Arduin. When Henry sent Otto I, Duke of Carinthia, to Italy with a force, Tedald of Canossa and Frederick joined him with armies to secure the Po Valley for Henry. Frederick, with his army, met Henry at Brescia in April, but took no more part in military actions, as he died in June.
