= Giovanni Orseolo =

First Venetian to hold power in Dalmatia

Co-doge of Venice
- Reign: 1002–1007
- Senior doge: Pietro II Orseolo
- Born: 984; Venice
- Died: 1007; Venice
- Burial: Church of San Zaccaria
- Spouse: Maria Argyra
- Issue: Basil Orseolo
- House: Orseolo
- Father: Pietro II Orseolo
- Mother: Maria Candiano

Giovanni Orseolo (984-1007) was Co-doge of Venice from 1002 until his death in 1007. He was the son of doge Pietro II Orseolo, of the powerful House of Orseolo. He was the first Venetian to hold power in Dalmatia, holding the title of Dux Dalmatiae.

== Biography ==
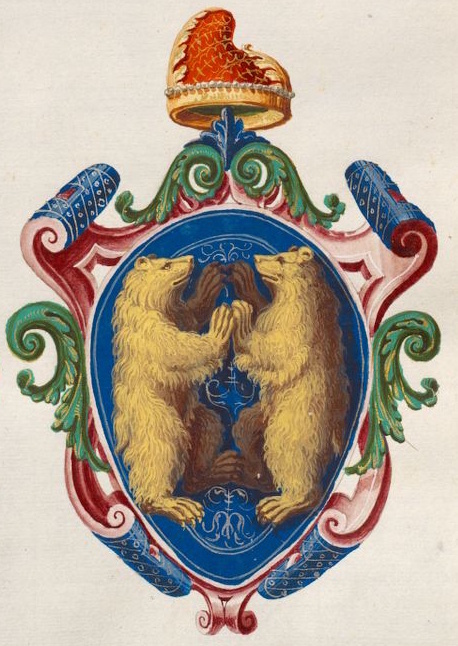
Coat of Arms of the House of Orseolo

Giovanni Orseolo, the eldest son of doge Pietro II Orseolo and his wife Maria Candiano, is first mentioned in historical records in 1002, when, at just eighteen years of age, his father appointed him as co-doge.

In June 1004, he traveled to Constantinople, where he married Maria Argyra, daughter of the Byzantine prince Marianos Argyros and a relative of Emperor Basil II, as well as the sister of the future Emperor Romanos III Argyros. The couple had a son in 1005, named Basil (Italian: Basilio). The marriage strengthened the alliance between Venice and the Byzantine Empire, which had already been reinforced by the doge's diplomatic skill. Pietro II likely took a keen interest in Basil II's expansionist policies, which were then focused on the Balkan Peninsula. The birth of a son, significantly named Basil, further supports this interpretation.

Under this agreement the Venetians would conquer Dalmatia and then hold it as a protectorate under Byzantine suzerainty. While in Constantinople he was given a standard to use in his upcoming invasion of Dalmatia by the Bishop of Olivolo. He was successful in establishing Venetian power on the Dalmatian coast, holding the title of Dux Dalmatiae.

However, Pietro's hopes for his heir were dashed in 1007, when Giovanni, his wife, and their young son died during an outbreak of plague. Their bodies were buried in the Church of San Zaccaria in Venice.

Following Giovanni's death, the office of co-doge passed to his brother Otto, a man of considerable ability, though generally regarded as less gifted than Giovanni.

== Sources ==
- Nicol, Donald MacGillivray (1992) [1988]. Byzantium and Venice: A Study in Diplomatic and Cultural Relations. Cambridge University Press. p. 42. ISBN 0521428947.
