= Rotho =

11th-century German bishop

Rotho von Büren (c. 1000; - 7 November 1051, Paderborn) was from 1036 to 1051 Bishop of Paderborn. He was from a noble family, of the Counts of Werl, Westphalia.
