= Aderald =

French Roman Catholic saint

Adérald

Priest, Archdeacon
- Born: 10th century
- Died: 20 October 1004
- Venerated in: Catholic Church
- Feast: 20 October

Adérald (died 20 October 1004) was a Christian saint venerated by the Catholic Church. His feast day is celebrated on 20 October.

== Biography ==
Adérald was born around the mid-10th century to a father named Walon and a mother named Odrade. Well-versed in Christian teachings, his parents entrusted his education to religious scholars. He studied the Holy Scriptures and soon became an acolyte under Manasses of Montdidier, Bishop of Troyes. Over time, his passion for the scriptures and the lives of the saints led him toward the priesthood.

After being ordained as a priest, Adérald became known for his commitment to the poor and the sick. His social efforts gained widespread recognition, despite his own humility, and many sought him out in hopes of receiving healing.

He was a canon and archdeacon of Troyes when he undertook a pilgrimage to the Holy Land. Upon his return, he brought back a relic from the Church of the Holy Sepulchre. With this relic he then founded a priory in Villacerf, a small village near Troyes, known at the time as Samblières which was later renamed Saint-Sépulcre.

Adérald died on 20 October 1004, only a few years after establishing the monastery. He was buried there according to his wishes.

== Veneration, relics, and desecration ==
His remains were venerated for several centuries and were transferred in 1791 to the parish church to protect them from the French Revolution. However, during the period of the Reign of Terror, his relics were desecrated, and his bones were thrown into a mass grave.

Saint Adérald continues to be honored by Catholics on 20 October. He is also venerated as a saint in the Eastern Orthodox Church.

== Bibliography ==
- Estienne Binet (1633). De la sainte hiérarchie de l'Église, et la vie de saint Adérald (in French). S. Cramoisy.
