= Eochaid ua Flannacáin =

Irish cleric and poet

Eochaid ua Flannacáin (935–1004) was an Irish cleric and poet.

== Life ==
Eochaid was the author of more than twenty surviving quasi-historical, genealogical and topographical poems, many of which were incorporated into Lebor Gabala Erenn. He was a member of Clann Sinaich, an ecclesiastical family of Armagh. At the time of his death he was superior (abbot or prior) of Clonfeacle and Lios Aoigheadh (unidentified). One of his sons, and several of his descendants, were abbots of Armagh.

== Obit ==
The Annals of Ulster contain Eochaid's obit sub anno 1004, stating:

Eochaid ua Flannacáin, superior of Les Oeiged and of Cluain Fiachna, a master of poetry and historical lore, died in the 69th year of his age.

== Commemorative verse ==
The obit was accompanied by a stanza commemorating him:

The full form of beautiful Eochaid
An ascending poetic psalm of happy aspect
eochaiss that he does not approach from behind(?)
A key to the lock of Ireland's ignorance.
'Eochaid of the undying knowledge'
Has long been an incontrovertible name for him;
For reproach in the matter of learning or wisdom
He has no cause to answer.
