= Battle of Pinhoe =

1001 battle in Devon, England against Danes

Coordinates: 50.743336°N 3.477244°W

The Battle of Pinhoe
Date	1001
Location	Pinhoe, Devon
Result	Danish Viking victory

Belligerents
Kingdom of England	Kingdom of Denmark: Danelaw

Commanders and leaders
Unknown	Unknown

Strength
Unknown	Unknown

Casualties and losses
Unknown	Unknown

The Battle of Pinhoe took place between the Danes and the men of Devon and Somerset at Pinhoe, Devon.

== The battle ==
In 1001, Vikings laid siege to Exeter, but due to the strong fortifications built during Athelstan's reign they could not break through. They then started pillaging nearby villages, and were met at Pinhoe by an army from the shires of Devon and Somerset. The battle was hard and the defenders nearly used up all their ammunition.

=== The priest of Pinhoe ===
A priest of Pinhoe wanted to resupply the troops with ammunition. He sneaked through the Danish lines and ran to Exeter to get arrows and arms. He successfully returned to the defenders and supplied them with the weapons.

=== The burning of Pinhoe ===
The weapons were not sufficient for the local defenders to defeat the Vikings. The Vikings infiltrated Pinhoe and burned it to the ground. This was as a warning for the citizens of Exeter.

=== The legacy of the priest ===
The priest was awarded for his outstanding bravery an annual payment of 16 shillings. It was said that this sum was still paid to the Vicar of Pinhoe in Victorian times.
