= 1120s =

Decade

The 1120s was a decade of the Julian Calendar which began on January 1, 1120, and ended on December 31, 1129.

== Events ==
=== 1120 ===
==== By place ====
====== Byzantine Empire ======
- Siege of Sozopolis: Byzantine forces under Emperor John II Komnenos conquer Sozopolis in Pisidia, from the Sultanate of Rum. The Seljuk garrison is defeated while they are trapped between the Byzantine cavalry and the army (who is besieging the fortress).

====== Levant ======
- January 16 – Council of Nablus: King Baldwin II and Patriarch Warmund convenes an assembly at Nablus – establishing the earliest surviving written laws of the Crusader Kingdom of Jerusalem. The prelates and noblemen who attend the meeting confirm the clergy's right to collect the tithe and to bear arms "in the cause of defense".
- Baldwin II grants the Knights Templar under Hugues de Payens and Godfrey de Saint-Omer a headquarters in a wing of the royal palace on the Temple Mount in the captured Al-Aqsa Mosque in the Old City of Jerusalem.
- Summer – Baldwin II leads an expedition to Antioch to defend the northern Crusader states. He signs a 1-year truce with Ilghazi, Artuqid ruler of Mardin, securing the possession of Kafartab and other fortresses in Syria.

====== Europe ======
- June 17 – Battle of Cutanda: The combined forces of Aragon and Navarre under King Alfonso the Battler crush the Almoravid army near Calamocha. Alfonso recaptures the fortified towns of Calatayud and Daroca.
- The Almoravid fleet under Admirals Abu Abd Allah ibn Maymum of Almería, and Isa ibn Maymum of Sevilla attacks the coastline of the Christian Kingdom of Galicia.
- Freiburg is founded by Conrad I and his elder brother, Duke Berthold III of Zähringen, as a free market town.

====== England ======
- King Henry I gives a portion of the Stoneleigh estate (located in Warwickshire) to Geoffrey de Clinton, his chamberlain and treasurer. He builds a motte and bailey castle and forms a lake to provide better defences.
- November 25 – The White Ship is sunk in the English Channel, off Barfleur. Henry I's only legitimate son, William Adelin, is among 300 (many of them Anglo-Norman nobility) who drown.
- The Pseudo-Ingulf's Croyland Chronicle records Cornwall as a nation distinct from England.

====== Asia ======
- Fang La, a Chinese rebel leader, leads an uprising against the Song Dynasty in Qixian Village (modern-day Zhejiang) in southeast China. He raises an army and captures Hangzhou.
- August – September (the eighth month of the Chinese calendar) – Wanyan Xiyin, a Jurchen nobleman and minister, completes the design of the first version of the Jurchen script.
- The flourishing south Chinese coastal city of Quanzhou claims a population of 500,000 citizens, including the hinterland.

==== By topic ====
====== Religion ======
- Order of Premonstratensians founded by Norbert of Xanten at Prémontré in Picardy.
- Bishop Urban begins the construction on Llandaff Cathedral in Wales.

====== Science ======
- Walcher of Malvern, an English astronomer and mathematician, creates a system of measurement for the Earth using degrees, minutes and seconds of latitude and longitude.

=== 1121 ===
==== By place ====
====== Byzantine Empire ======
- Emperor John II Komnenos recovers southwestern Anatolia (modern Turkey) from the Seljuk Turks and then hastens to the Balkans, where the Pechenegs are continuing their incursions. He transfers Byzantine troops to the Danube frontier at Paristrion.

====== Levant ======
- Summer – Seljuk forces under Toghtekin make extensive raids into Galilee. King Baldwin II of Jerusalem, in reprisal, crosses the Jordan River with a Crusader army and ravages the countryside. He occupies and destroys a fortress that Toghtekin has built at Jerash.

====== Europe ======
- March 2 – Petronilla of Lorraine becomes regent of Holland (Low Countries) after her husband, Floris II ("the Fat") dies. He is succeeded by his 6-year-old son Dirk VI (Theodoric).
- A large rebellion takes place in Córdoba (modern Spain) against the ruling Almoravid dynasty.

====== England ======
- January 24 – Adeliza of Louvain, age 17, marries King Henry I of England two months after the accidental death of the heir to the English throne, Henry's only legitimate son, William Adelin.

====== Eurasia ======
- Summer – Sultan Mahmud II of the Seljuk Empire declares a Holy War on the Kingdom of Georgia. He sends an expedition under Ilghazi, the Artukid ruler of Mardin, to invade the country.
- August 12 – Battle of Didgori: King David IV ("the Builder") of Georgia with a Georgian army of 55,600 men) defeats the 300,000-strong Seljuk coalition forces at Mount Didgori.

====== Asia ======
- Emperor Emperor Huizong of Song sends an expedition to crush the rebellion at Hangzhou (modern-day Zhejiang) in China. The rebels are defeated and their leader Fang La is captured and executed.

==== By topic ====
====== Religion ======
- Spring – Peter Abelard, a French theologian and philosopher, is condemned and charged with the heresy of Sabellius in a synod at Soissons. Abelard writes Sic et Non.
- April 22 – Antipope Gregory VIII (supported by Emperor Henry V) is arrested by papal troops at Sutri. He is taken to Rome and imprisoned in the Septizonium.
- December 25 (Christmas Day) – The Praemonstratensian Order (Norbertines) is formed, when a group of canons make solemn vows at Prémontré.
- Henry I founds Reading Abbey in England. The Cluniac Order populates the abbey.
- The third and largest church is completed at Cluny Abbey (modern France).
- L'Aumône Abbey is founded by Count Theobald IV of Blois at Loir-et-Cher.

=== 1122 ===
==== By place ====
====== Byzantine Empire ======
- Battle of Beroia: Emperor John II Komnenos transfers the Byzantine field army from Asia Minor (where it has been engaged against the Seljuk Turks) to the Balkans. The Pechenegs who have set up their camp (defended by a circular formation of wagons) near Beroia (modern Bulgaria) are defeated. John orders the Varangian Guard (some 480 men), the elite Palace Guard to hack their way through the Pecheneg circle of wagons, causing a general rout in their camp. Pecheneg survivors are taken captive and enlisted into the Byzantine army.

====== Egypt ======
- February 13 – Al-Ma'mun al-Bata'ihi is formally proclaimed vizier of the Fatimid Caliphate by Caliph al-Amir.

====== Levant ======
- September 13 – Count Joscelin I and Waleran of Le Puiset are taken prisoner by Turkish forces led by Belek Ghazi near Saruj in northern Syria. Belek offers Joscelin liberty in return for the cession of Edessa. He refuses to accept these terms; Joscelin and Waleran and 60 other Crusaders are taken to the castle at Kharput.

====== Europe ======
- August 8 – A Venetian fleet under Doge Domenico Michiel with well over a hundred ships sets sail from Venice, carrying an army of around 15,000 men and siege-material on the Venetian Crusade. The fleet departs for Palestine – but the Venetians pause to attack Corfu (this in retaliation for the refusal of John II to renew exclusive trading privileges). For six months, throughout the winter of 1122–23, the Venetians lay siege to the Byzantine island.
- King Alfonso the Battler of Aragon creates the lay community of knights known as the Confraternity of Belchite. It is the first local attempt to imitate the Order of the Knights Templar created in Palestine.
- The Almoravid fleet attacks Sicily to suppress the Italo-Norman raiders. The same year the Muslim population of Malta rebels against the Normans.

====== Eurasia ======
- Siege of Tbilisi: The Georgians led by King David IV ('the Builder') re-conquer the city of Tbilisi from the Emirate of Tbilisi after a 1-year siege. David makes it his capital and unifies the Georgian State.

==== By topic ====
====== Religion ======
- September 23 – The Concordat of Worms: Emperor Henry V recognizes freedom of election of the clergy and promises to restore all Church property. This brings an end to the power struggle between the papacy and the Holy Roman Empire, known as the Investiture Controversy. In the aftermath, Cappenberg Abbey is founded by Count Gottfried II for the new order of Premonstratensians.

=== 1123 ===
==== By date ====
====== January–March ======
- January 29 – Frederick I, Archbishop of Bremen since 1104, dies after a reign of more than 18 years, and is succeeded by Adalbert II.
- February 25 – Japan's Emperor Toba abdicates in favor of his 3-year-old son Sutoku after a 16-year reign. The retired Emperor Shirakawa rules as regent during Toba's minority.
- March 18 –
  - The First Council of the Lateran convenes in Rome; it confirms the 1122 Concordat of Worms and demands clerical celibacy in the Catholic Church.
  - The coronation of Japan's Emperor Sutoku takes place.
- March 25 – St Bartholomew’s Hospital in London, commonly known as Barts, is founded by Rahere, a favourite courtier of King Henry I; it is now the oldest hospital in the United Kingdom operating on its original site.

====== April–June ======
- April 18 – King Baldwin II of Jerusalem is captured by Turkish forces under Belek Ghazi – while preparing to practice falconry near Gargar on the Euphrates. Most of the Crusader army is massacred, and Baldwin is taken to the castle at Kharput. To save the situation the Venetians are asked to help. Doge Domenico Michiel lifts the siege of Corfu (see 1122) and takes his fleet to Acre, arriving at the port in the end of May.
- May 9 – A fire in the city of Lincoln, England, nearly destroys the Lincolnshire town; it is memorialized 600 years later by historian Paul de Rapin.
- May 29 – Battle of Yibneh: A Crusader army led by Eustace Grenier defeats the Fatimid forces (16,000 men) near Ibelin. Despite the numerical superiority, Vizier Al-Ma'mun al-Bata'ihi is forced to withdraw to Egypt while his camp is plundered by the Crusaders. Eustace returns to Jerusalem in triumph, but later dies on June 15.
- May 30 – The Venetian fleet arrives at Ascalon and instantly sets about attacking the Fatimid fleet. The Egyptians fall into a trap, caught between two Venetian squadrons, and are destroyed or captured. While sailing back to Acre, the Venetians capture a merchant-fleet of ten richly laden vessels.
- May – Baldwin II and Joscelin I are rescued by 50 Armenian soldiers (disguised as monks and merchants) at Kharput. They kill the guards, and infiltrate the castle where the prisoners are kept. Joscelin escapes to seek help. However, the castle is soon besieged by Turkish forces under Belek Ghazi – and is after some time recaptured. Baldwin and Waleran of Le Puiset are moved for greater safety to the castle of Harran.
- June – King David IV of Georgia, nicknamed "Davit IV Aghmashenebeli" ("David the Builder") by his subjects, defeats Sultan Mahmud II of the Seljuk Empire (encompassing much of what is now Iraq and Iran).

====== July–September ======
- July 22 – William de Corbeil is installed as the new Archbishop of Canterbury, the highest-ranking cleric in England, after his February 4 election is approved by Pope Callixtus II.
- August 9 – Battle of Al-Dimas: An Italo-Norman campaign in North Africa ends with their troops being massacred by Zirid forces near Mahdia (modern Tunisia).
- August 29 – King Eystein I (Magnusson) dies during a feast at Hustad after a 20-year reign, leaving his brother Sigurd the Crusader to rule over Norway.
- September 27 – Prince Wuqimai of the House of Wanyan becomes the new Emperor of China after the death, on September 19, of his elder brother, the Emperor Taizu, founder of the Jin dynasty. Wuqimai is proclaimed the Emperor Taizong of Jin.

====== October–December ======
- October 7 – Pope Calixtus II issues the papal bull Aequitatis et justitiae, placing the Roman Catholic Diocese of Tricarico in Italy under the protection of the papacy.
- November 12 – In Spain, Queen Urraca of León and Castile, the self-proclaimed Imperator totius Hispaniae ("Empress of All Spain"), formally acknowledges 8-year-old Fernando Pérez de Lara as her son and an heir, after he was born out of wedlock from her relationship with Count Pedro González de Lara.
- December 12 – At Sankt Veit an der Glan, Engelbert II of the House of Sponheim becomes the new Duke of Carinthia and the Margrave of Verona (an area encompassing parts of Austria, Slovenia and Italy) upon the death of his older brother Henry IV.

==== By place ====
====== Middle East ======
- The Pactum Warmundi: A treaty of alliance, is established between the Kingdom of Jerusalem and the Republic of Venice at Acre. The Venetians receive a street, with a church, baths and a bakery, free of all obligations, in every town of the kingdom. They are also excused of all tolls and taxes.

====== Europe ======
- Sigurd I performs a Crusade, the Kalmare ledung, to Christianize the Swedish province of Småland. He makes a pact with King Niels of Denmark.

==== By topic ====
====== Religion ======
- Diego Gelmírez, archbishop of Santiago de Compostela, declares a Crusade in Al-Andalus (modern Spain) against the Almoravids.
- Furness Abbey (or St Mary of Furness) is founded in England by Stephen, count of Boulogne, for the Order of Savigny.

=== 1125 ===
==== By place ====
====== Levant ======
- June 11 – Battle of Azaz: The Crusader states led by King Baldwin II of Jerusalem defeat the Seljuk forces at Azaz and raise the siege of the town. Baldwin mobilizes a force of 1,100 armoured knights (from Antioch, Edessa and Tripoli) and 2,000 foot-soldiers. The Crusaders capture the Seljuk camp and Baldwin takes enough loot to ransom the prisoners taken by the Seljuk Turks (including his 4-year-old daughter Ioveta and Joscelin II who are taken hostage). Aq-Sunqur al-Bursuqi, governor (atabeg) of Mosul, withdraws to Aleppo and is forced to make a truce, leaving the frontier in northern Syria in peace for 18 months.

====== Europe ======
- May 23 – Henry V, Holy Roman Emperor, dies of cancer in Utrecht after leading an expedition against King Louis VI ("the Fat") of France and then against the citizens of Worms. Having no legitimate children, Henry leaves his possessions to his nephew, Frederick II ("the One-Eyed"), duke of Swabia. At the Hoftag diet in Regensburg, Lothair, duke of Saxony, is elected King of Germany and crowned at Aachen on September 13.
- Lothair II (supported by Pope Honorius II) asks Frederick II to restore to the crown the estates that he has inherited from Henry V. Frederick refuses, and by year's end a succession dispute breaks out between the House of Welf and the House of Hohenstaufen. The latter is led by Frederick and his brother Conrad III, duke of Franconia.
- King Inge the Younger of Sweden is murdered in Vreta Abbey at the instigation of Queen Ulvhild Håkansdotter after a 20-year reign. Her cousin Magnus I ("the Strong") proclaims himself ruler over the Lands of Sweden (Norrland, Svealand and Gothenland) (until 1134).
- The Republic of Venice pillages the islands of Rhodes, ravages Samos and Lesbos, and occupies Chios (controlled by the Byzantine Empire). The Republic of Florence sacks and conquers the neighboring independent republic of Fiesole in Italy.
- Saracen pirates raid the city of Antibes in Provence and the Benedictine monastery of Saint Honorat on the Lérins Islands (French Riviera).
- The first fair in Portugal is created in Ponte de Lima; it is an early sign of commercialization and economic development.
- King Alfonso the Battler of Aragon and Navarre leads a Castellan raid in Andalusia (Southern Spain).

====== England ======
- King Henry I of England arranges a marriage between his nephew Stephen of Blois and the 20-year-old Matilda, daughter and heiress of Eustace III, count of Boulogne. This gives Stephen control of the County of Boulogne and also lands in England that have belonged to Eustace (who dies on his return from the Holy Land).

====== Asia ======
- November – Jin–Song War: Emperor Taizong of the Jurchen-led Jin dynasty declares war on the Chinese Song dynasty – and orders his armies to invade Song territory. He sends the Western army to the city of Taiyuan in Shanxi province and the Eastern army to Bianjing (modern-day Kaifeng), the Song capital. The Song forces are not expecting an invasion and are caught off guard.
- The Khamag Mongol, a Mongolic tribal confederation, begins to play an important role on the Mongolian Plateau. They occupy the fertile lands of the basins of the rivers Onon, Kherlen and Tuul in the Khentii Mountains.

====== Africa ======
- October 3 – Al-Ma'mun al-Bata'ihi, the vizier of the Fatimid Caliphate, is dismissed and imprisoned by Caliph al-Amir.

==== By topic ====
====== Arts ======
- Albert of Aix, German historian and writer, begins his Historia Hierosolymitanae expeditionis (approximate date).

====== Education ======
- March 29 – Reading School is founded in Berkshire in England.

====== Religion ======
- A collection of Zen Buddhist koans is compiled, in the Chinese Blue Cliff Record.

=== 1126 ===
==== By place ====
====== Byzantine Empire ======
- Summer – Emperor John II Komnenos re-confirms the treaty of 1082. This ends the hostilities with Hungary and Venice. John secures Braničevo, and recovers the region of Sirmium on the Danube, but is forced by Venice to renew the exclusive commercial privileges.

====== Levant ======
- Spring – The Crusaders under Pons, count of Tripoli, attack the fortress of Rafaniya (once held by Pons' grandfather Raymond IV), which dominates the entry of the Buqaia from the Orontes Valley. They besiege the fortress for 18 days and capture it on March 31.
- Autumn – Bohemond II takes over his inheritance of the Principality of Antioch. He sails from Otranto with a Norman fleet of 24 ships, carrying a number of troops and horses. Bohemond lands at the port of St. Symeon early in October and is welcomed at Antioch.

====== Europe ======
- February 18 – Battle of Chlumec: Duke Soběslav I defeats a German army under King Lothair III and his Moravian ally, Duke Otto II the Black. Soběslav becomes the head of the Bohemian Principality.
- March 8 – Queen Urraca of León ("the Reckless") dies after a 17-year reign. She is succeeded by her 21-year-old son Alfonso VII el Emperador who becomes king of León (until 1157).
- Ragnvald Knaphövde, pretender to the Swedish throne, is killed by upset peasants at a local thing. Sweden is without a ruler, but Magnus I ("the Strong") claims sovereignty over Gothenland.
- Summer – King Alfonso the Battler of Aragon and Navarre launches a campaign raid into Granada in Andalusia (modern Spain) against the Almoravids. In the aftermath, the Almoravid deport Jews and Christians from Andalusia to Morocco.
- Winter – King Lothair III makes Henry X ("the Proud"), duke of Bavaria to succeed his late father, Henry IX ("the Black"), who has died on December 13.

====== Britain ======
- Shrewsbury Castle is granted by King Henry I to his second wife, Queen Adeliza of Louvain (or Adelicia). The command of the castle is given to William FitzAlan.
- Rutherglen (located in South Lanarkshire) becomes one of the first of the Royal Burghs in Scotland.

====== Asia ======
- Spring – In China, scholars and farmers demonstrate around the capital city of Kaifeng, for the restoration of a trusted military official, Li Gang (李綱). Small conflicts erupt between the protestors and the government.
- January 18 – Emperor Hui Zong of the Song Dynasty abdicates in favour of his eldest son, Qin Zong after a 24-year reign. Hui Zong assumes the honorary title of Taishang Huang (or "Retired Emperor").
- Jin–Song War: Jurchen forces reach the Yellow River Valley, two days after New Year. Remnants of the court flee south, including much of the populace, and communities such as the Kaifeng Jews.
- January 31 – Jurchen forces lay siege to Kaifeng. Qin Zong negotiates the terms of surrender, agreeing an annual indemnity. He orders Song forces to defend the prefectures of the Northern Song.

==== By topic ====
====== Literature ======
- Adelard of Bath, an English philosopher, translates Muḥammad ibn Mūsā al-Khwārizmī's arithmetic and astronomical works into Latin.
- Two previously written Chinese pharmaceutical works, one by Shen Kuo and one by Su Shi, are combined into one written work.

====== Religion ======
- Olegarius, archbishop of Tarragona, creates a community of knights (known as the "Confraternity of Tarragona"), to combat the Almoravids in Catalonia.

=== 1127 ===
==== By place ====
====== Europe ======
- March 2 – Charles the Good, count of Flanders, is murdered by a band of knights while praying in church; he leaves no children. King Louis VI of France appoints William Clito (son of Robert Curthose) as new ruler. But the Flemish towns of Bruges, Ghent, Saint-Omer and Ypres recognize (with English financial support) Thierry of Alsace as rival count.
- Spring – The forces of Alfonso VII of León and Castile begin the Siege of Guimarães, which will end in their withdrawal.
- Summer – King Roger II of Sicily claims the Hauteville possessions in Italy as well the overlordship of Capua. However, a coalition of Norman noblemen in Apulia and Calabria resist (supported by Pope Honorius II) against Sicilian rule. The same year, Roger regains control over Malta after a rebellion. Roger II also establishes a pact with the maritime Republic of Savona to guarantee the security of the Mediterranean Sea, probably following an Almoravid raid against the Sicilian realm.
- December 18 – Conrad III (with support of the imperial cities, Swabia and Austria) is elected and crowned as anti-king of Germany at Nuremberg.

====== England ======
- King Henry I of England arranges the marriage of his daughter Matilda (the widow of Emperor Henry V) to the 14-year-old Geoffrey of Anjou (son of Count Fulk V). This is done to ensure an alliance between England and Anjou, and to prevent Fulk allying with Louis VI. Henry has the English nobles swear allegiance to Matilda as the rightful heir to the throne. Upon his death, her cousin Stephen of Blois crosses the channel and usurps her throne, becoming the King of England. She wages a lengthy civil war known as the Anarchy, which lasts from 1135–1154.

====== Levant ======
- Imad ad-Din Zengi, a Turkish military leader, becomes governor (atabeg) of Mosul. He seizes the cities of Nisibin, Sinjar and Harran in the Jazira Region (Northern Mesopotamia).

====== Asia ======
- January 9 – Jin–Song Wars: Jurchen forces sack the Chinese capital of Kaifeng of the Northern Song dynasty during the Jingkang incident. They capture Emperor Qinzong, along with his father, Huizong, and members of the House of Zhao.
- June 12 – Qinzong's younger brother, the 20-year-old Gaozong, re-establishes the Song dynasty (as the Southern Song dynasty) in Lin'an (modern-day Hangzhou) and is proclaimed emperor.

==== By topic ====
====== Religion ======
- The Kalyan minaret (as part of the Po-i-Kalyan mosque complex) is completed in Bukhara (modern Uzbekistan).

=== 1128 ===
==== By place ====
====== Byzantine Empire ======
- Byzantine–Hungarian War: Emperor John II Komnenos defeats the Hungarians and their Serbian allies at the fortress of Haram (or Chramon), which is modern-day Nova Palanka.

====== Europe ======
- February – Saint-Omer and Ghent declare for Thierry (Theoderic) in his challenge to his cousin William Clito for the County of Flanders.
- June 17 – King Henry I of England marries his only legitimate daughter, dowager Empress Matilda, to the 14-year-old Geoffrey Plantagenet ("the Fair"), count of Anjou, at Le Mans.
- June 21 – Battle of Axspoele in Flanders: William, with his Norman knights and French allies, defeats Thierry, who is forced to flee to Bruges and then to Aalst where he is besieged.
- June 24 – Battle of São Mamede: Count Alfonso I (Henriques) defeats the forces led by his mother, Queen Theresa of Portugal, near Guimarães, and gains control of the county. Alfonso styles himself "Prince of Portugal".
- June 29 – Conrad III, anti-king of Germany, is crowned "King of Italy" by Archbishop Anselmo della Pusterla at Monza in Lombardy.
- July 27 – The city of Bruges in Flanders (modern Belgium) receives its city charter as well new walls, and canals are built.
- July 28 – William Clito dies as a result of a wound received at the siege of Aalst a fortnight earlier, leaving Thierry as sole claimant to the County of Flanders. He sets up his seat of government at Bruges and King Louis VI ("the Fat") of France agrees to his accession.
- August – Pope Honorius II invests Roger II of Sicily as duke of Apulia at Benevento, after his failure to form an coalition against Roger.

====== Asia ======
- January 15: Lý Dương Hoán became the king of Đại Việt, ascending to the throne as Emperor Lý Thần Tông.
- Jin–Song Wars: Emperor Gaozong of the Song dynasty establishes a new capital at Yangzhou, while the government retreats south, after Jurchen forces capture the previous capital of Kaifeng in the Jingkang Incident.
- Forces of the kingdom of Champa invade Đại Việt.

==== By topic ====
====== Religion ======
- November 24 – Waverley Abbey is founded by Bishop William Giffard in the south of England. The first abbot and 12 Cistercian monks are brought from L'Aumône Abbey in Normandy.
- Holyrood Abbey is founded in Edinburgh by King David I of Scotland.
- Kelso Abbey is founded by Scottish monks of the Tironensian Order.
- Honorius II recognizes and confirms the Order of the Knights Templar. The French abbot Bernard of Clairvaux codifies the rule of the Order. Hugues de Payens, French Grand Master of the Order, visits both England and Scotland, where he raises men and money for the Order.

=== 1129 ===
==== By place ====
====== Europe ======
- April 14 – Following the Capetian tradition, King Louis VI (the Fat) has his eldest son Philip crowned as co-ruler of France at Rheims Cathedral. Louis himself becomes the national protector of all France.
- June 2 – Fulk V, count of Anjou, marries Melisende (daughter of King Baldwin II) the heir to the Kingdom of Jerusalem. Fulk gives up his title which passes to his 15-year-old son, Geoffrey V (the Fair).
- September – Roger II of Sicily gains recognition as duke at Melfi from the Norman nobles of Naples, Bari, Capua, Salerno and other cities that have resisted him.
- Burgsteinfurt Castle is built in what is now Steinfurt (modern Germany).

====== Asia ======
- Jin–Song War: Emperor Gao Zong of the Song dynasty moves the capital from Yangzhou to Hangzhou, after the Jurchen Jin dynasty captures Kaifeng in the Jingkang Incident.
- March 26 – Gao Zong abdicates the throne after a mutiny of the palace guard. His 2-year-old son Zhao Fu succeeds him, but Empress Meng becomes regent and the sole ruler.
- April 20 – Gao Zong regains the throne (with the support of the imperial army led by General Han Shizhong). Zhao Fu is forced to abdicate with Meng having ruled for 25 days.
- July 24 – Former Emperor Shirakawa dies at his native Kyoto. His son Toba begins his cloistered rule, sharing power with Sutoku, a grandson of Shirakawa.

==== By topic ====
====== Religion ======
- January 23 – Henry of Blois becomes bishop of Winchester after the death of William Giffard (who was also Lord Chancellor to King Henry I) in England.

== Significant people ==
- Al-Mustarshid
- Pope Honorius II

== Births ==
1120

- Alfonso of Capua, Italo-Norman nobleman (d. 1144)
- Arnold I of Vaucourt, archbishop of Trier (d. 1183)
- Frederick II of Berg, archbishop of Cologne (d. 1158)
- Fujiwara no Yorinaga, Japanese statesman (d. 1156)
- Gonçalo Mendes de Sousa, Portuguese nobleman (d. 1190)
- Ioveta of Bethany, princess and daughter of Baldwin II
- Jaksa Gryfita, Polish nobleman and knight (d. 1176)
- Judah ben Saul ibn Tibbon, Arab-Jewish translator
- Louis VII (le Jeune), king of France (d. 1180)
- Philip of Milly, French nobleman and knight (d. 1171)
- Rainald of Dassel, archbishop of Cologne (d. 1167)
- Roger de Mowbray, English nobleman (d. 1188)
- Urban III, pope of the Catholic Church (d. 1187)
- William I ("the Wicked"), king of Sicily (d. 1166)
- Zhao Boju, Chinese landscape painter (d. 1182)

1121

- Ascelina, French Cistercian nun and mystic (d. 1195)
- Chōgen, Japanese Buddhist monk (kanjin) (d. 1206)
- Henry of France, archbishop of Reims (d. 1175)
- Joscelin of Louvain, Flemish nobleman (d. 1180)
- Kojijū, Japanese noblewoman and poet (d. 1202)

1122

- February 24 – Wanyan Liang, Chinese emperor (d. 1161)
- date unknown
  - Frederick I (Barbarossa), Holy Roman Emperor (d. 1190)
  - Fujiwara no Kiyoko, Japanese empress consort (d. 1182)
  - Ibn Hubal, Arab physician and scientist (approximate date)
  - Isaac ben Abba Mari, French Jewish rabbi (approximate date)
  - Jayavarman VII, Cambodian ruler of the Khmer Empire (d. 1218))

1123

- March 29 – Shi Zong (or Wulu), Chinese emperor (d. 1189)
- Minamoto no Yoshitomo, Japanese general (d. 1160)
- Osbern of Gloucester, English lexicographer (d. 1200)
- Parakramabahu I, Sri Lankan king of Polonnaruwa (d. 1186)
- Robert I (the Great), count of Dreux (approximate date)

1124

- Ottokar III of Styria, Margrave (d. 1164)
- Possible date – Eleanor of Aquitaine, Duchess of Aquitaine, queen consort successively of France and England, and patron of the arts (d. 1204)

1125

- October 17 – Lu You, Chinese poet and writer (d. 1210)
- date unknown
  - Abraham ben David, French rabbi (approximate date)
  - Baldwin of Forde, English archbishop (approximate date)
  - Bolesław IV (the Curly), duke of Poland (approximate date)
  - Chueang, Thai ruler of the Ngoenyang Kingdom (d. 1192)
  - Eystein II (Haraldsson), king of Norway (approximate date)
  - Fernando Rodríguez de Castro, Spanish nobleman (d. 1185)
  - Giovanni de Surdis Cacciafronte, Italian bishop (d. 1184)
  - Guigues V, count of Albon and Grenoble (approximate date)
  - Imad ad-Din al-Isfahani, Persian historian and writer (d. 1201)
  - Matilda of Savoy, queen consort of Portugal (d. 1157)
  - Otto II (the Rich), margrave of Meissen (d. 1190)
  - Reginald of Châtillon, French nobleman (d. 1187)
  - William de Vesci, Norman High Sheriff (d. 1184)
  - William of Æbelholt, French churchman (d. 1203)

1126

- Abu Madyan, Andalusian mystic and Sufi master (d. 1198)
- Averroes ibn Rushd, Andalusian judge and physician (d. 1198)
- Eynion de Tilston, Norman knight and lord of Tilston (approximate date)
- Fan Chengda, Chinese politician, poet and geographer (d. 1193)
- Michael the Syrian ("the Great"), Syriac patriarch (d. 1199)
- Mieszko III the Old, duke of Greater Poland (d. 1202)
- Muneko, Japanese princess and empress (d. 1189)
- Peter I of Courtenay, French nobleman (d. 1183)
- Sibylla of Burgundy, queen of Sicily (d. 1150)
- Sviatoslav III, Grand Prince of Kiev (d. 1194)
- Taira no Tokiko, Japanese Buddhist nun (d. 1185)

1127

- April 16 – Felix of Valois, French nobleman and hermit (d. 1212)
- May 23 – Uijong, Korean ruler of Goryeo (d. 1173)
- July 23 – Zhao Fu, emperor of the Song Dynasty (d. 1129)
- October 18 – Go-Shirakawa, Japanese emperor (d. 1192)
- October 29 – Yang Wanli, Chinese politician and poet (d. 1206)
- November 27 – Emperor Xiaozong of Song, Chinese emperor (d. 1194)
- December – Henry I ("the Liberal"), count of Champagne (d. 1181)
- Bolesław I the Tall, duke of Wrocław (d. 1201)
- Approximate date – Julian of Cuenca, Spanish bishop

1128 (many dates approximate)

- March 18 – Stephen of Tournai, French bishop (d. 1203)
- Absalon, Danish archbishop and statesman (d. 1201)
- Adolf II, count of Schauenburg and Holstein (d. 1164)
- Alain de Lille, French theologian and poet (approximate date)
- Ali ibn Muhammad ibn al-Walid, Arab theologian (d. 1215)
- Constance of Hauteville, princess of Antioch (d. 1163)
- John Doukas Komnenos, Byzantine governor (d. 1176)
- John Kontostephanos, Byzantine aristocrat
- Lorcán Ua Tuathail, Irish archbishop of Dublin (d. 1180)
- Ludwig II ("the Iron"), landgrave of Thuringia (d. 1172)
- Muhammad II ibn Mahmud, Seljuk sultan (d. 1159)
- Ruzbihan Baqli, Persian poet and mystic (d. 1209)
- Taira no Norimori, Japanese nobleman (suicide 1185)

1129

- Abu al-Abbas as-Sabti, Moroccan Sufi writer (d. 1204)
- Date Tomomune, Japanese nobleman and samurai (d. 1199)
- Elisabeth of Schönau, German Benedictine abbess (d. 1164)
- Henry the Lion, duke of Saxony and Bavaria (d. 1195)
- Theophanes Kerameus, bishop of Rossano (d. 1152)

== Deaths ==
1120

- September 3 – Blessed Gerard, founder of the Knights Hospitaller
- September 24 – Welf II ("the Fat"), duke of Bavaria (b. 1072)
- November 25
  - Matilda FitzRoy, countess and daughter of Henry I
  - Ralph of Pont-Echanfray, Norman knight (b. 1070)
  - Richard d'Avranches, 2nd Earl of Chester (b. 1094)
  - William Adelin, duke and son of Henry I (b. 1103)
- Adelaide, countess of Vermandois and Valois (or 1124)
- Afridun I (the Martyr), ruler (shah) of Shirvan (b. 1046)
- Eudo Dapifer (or FitzHerbert), Norman nobleman
- Fujiwara no Atsutaka, Japanese nobleman and poet
- Fujiwara no Sadazane, Japanese calligrapher (b. 1076)
- Ingegerd, queen of Denmark and Sweden (b. 1046)
- Raymond Pilet d'Alès, French nobleman (b. 1075)

1121

- January 7 – Erminold, German Benedictine abbot
- January 18 – William of Champeaux, French philosopher
- February 10 – Domnall Ua Lochlainn, Irish king (b. 1048)
- March 2 – Floris II ("the Fat"), count of Holland (b. 1085)
- April 23 – Jón Ögmundsson, Icelandic bishop (b. 1052)
- August 7 – Ulrich I of Passau (or Udalrich), German bishop
- December 11 – Al-Afdal Shahanshah, Fatimid caliph (b. 1066)
- December 13 – Ulrich of Eppenstein, German abbot
- Abd al-Aziz ibn Mansur, Hammadid governor and ruler
- Alfanus II (or Alfano), Lombard archbishop of Salerno
- Al-Tughrai, Persian official, poet and alchemist (b. 1061)
- Bartolf Leslie (or Bartholomew), Scottish nobleman
- Fang La, Chinese rebel leader (executed in Kaifeng)
- Frederick of Liege, German prince-bishop and saint
- Lü Shinang, Chinese religious leader (Manichaean cult)
- Masud Sa'd Salman, Persian poet (approximate date)
- Muireadhach Ua Flaithbheartaigh, Irish king of Iar Connacht
- Robert of Bounalbergo, Norman nobleman and crusader
- Zhou Bangyan, Chinese bureaucrat and ci poet (b. 1056)
- Zhou Tong, Chinese archery teacher and martial artist

1122

- January 18 – Christina Ingesdotter, Kievan princess
- March 12 – Giso IV, count of Gudensberg (b. 1070)
- August 9 – Cuno of Praeneste, German cardinal
- September 9 – Al-Hariri of Basra, Abbasid poet (b. 1054)
- September 16 – Vitalis of Savigny, Catholic French Saint and itinerant preacher (b. 1060)
- October 20 – Ralph d'Escures, English archbishop
- November 8 – Ilghazi, Artuqid ruler of Mardin
- November 28 – Ottokar II, margrave of Styria
- December 3 – Berthold III, duke of Zähringen
- December 4 – Henry III, duke of Carinthia
- date unknown
  - Al-Baghawi, Persian hadith scholar and writer
  - Alberada of Buonalbergo, duchess of Apulia
  - John of Tours, Bishop of Wells
  - Sybilla of Normandy, queen of Scotland
  - Yejong, Korean ruler of Goryeo (b. 1079)
  - Wang Cha-ji, Korean general (b. 1066)

1123

- February 9 – Otto (the Rich), count of Ballenstedt (b. 1070)
- March 4 – Peter of Pappacarbone, Italian abbot and bishop
- May 3 – Felicia of Roucy, queen of Aragon and Navarre
- June 15 – Eustace Grenier, French constable and regent
- July 18 – Bruno di Segni, Italian prelate and bishop
- August 29 – Eystein I (Magnusson), king of Norway
- September 11 – Marbodius of Rennes, French archdeacon
- September 19 – Taizu, emperor of the Jin Dynasty (b. 1068)
- September 27 – Fujiwara no Akisue, Japanese nobleman (b. 1055)
- December 14 – Henry IV, duke of Carinthia (House of Sponheim)
- Davyd Sviatoslavich, Kievan prince of Murom and Chernigov
- Henry II, margrave of Meissen and the Saxon Ostmark (b. 1103)
- Langri Tangpa, Tibetan Buddhist monk and master (b. 1054)
- Louis the Springer (or Leaper), German nobleman (b. 1042)

1124

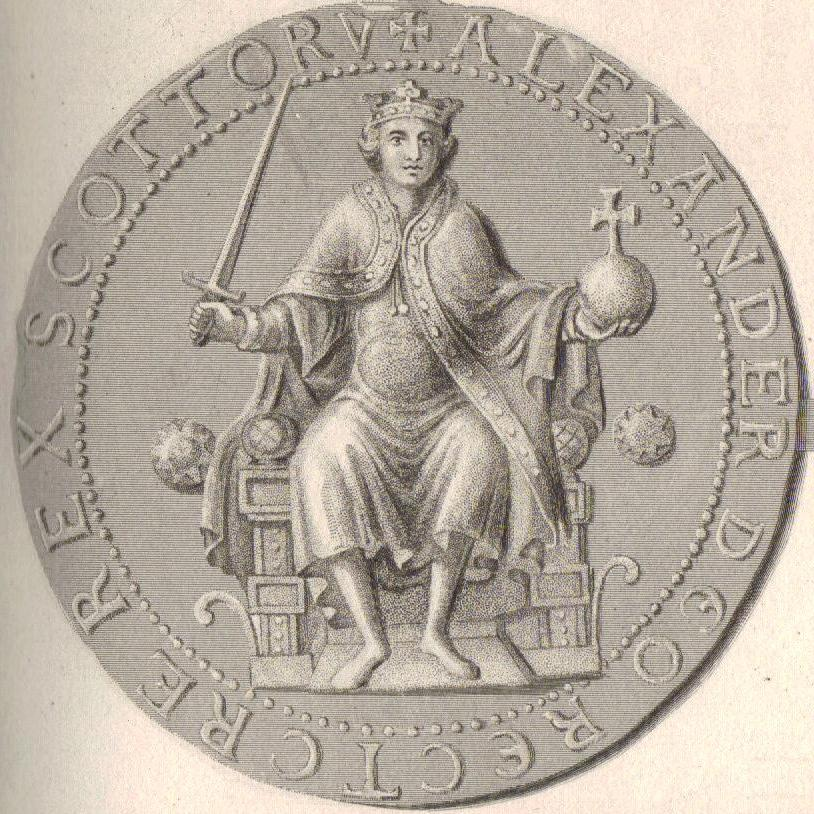
Alexander I of Scotland

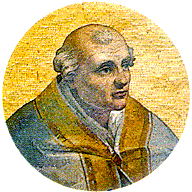
Pope Callixtus II

- February 2 – Bořivoj II, Duke of Bohemia (b. c. 1064)
- March 15 – Ernulf, Bishop of Rochester (b. c. 1040)
- April 23 – King Alexander I of Scotland (b. c. 1078)
- June 12 – Hasan-i Sabbah, founder of the Nizari Ismaili state (b. c. 1250)
- June 24 – Nicholas of Worcester, prior of the Benedictine priory of Worcester Cathedral
- December 13 – Pope Callixtus II, Burgundian-born Catholic religious leader (b. c. 1065)
- Guibert of Nogent, French historian and theologian (b. 1053)

1125

- January 24 – David IV (the Builder), king of Georgia (b. 1073)
- April 12 – Vladislaus I, duke of Bohemia (b. 1065)
- May 19 – Vladimir II, Grand Prince of Kiev (b. 1053)
- May 23 – Henry V, Holy Roman Emperor (b. 1086)
- June 22 – Lambert of St-Bertin, French chronicler
- September 14 – Constance, princess of Antioch (b. 1078)
- September 27 – Richeza of Berg, duchess of Bohemia
- October 21 – Cosmas of Prague, Bohemian chronicler
- December 3 – Berengar II, German nobleman
- December 29 – Agnes I, abbess of Quedlinburg
- Adalbert II, count of Mörsberg (approximate date)
- Alina Martain, French Benedictine nun and saint
- Al-Ma'mun al-Bata'ihi, vizier of the Fatimid Caliphate
- Bernard of Sédirac, Spanish abbot and archbishop
- Bonfilius, Italian Benedictine monk and bishop
- Eustace III, count of Boulogne (approximate date)
- Harding of Bristol, English sheriff reeve (b. 1048)
- Hugh I, count of Champagne (approximate date)
- Ibn al-Khashshab, Seljuk Shi'i magistrate (qadi)
- Inge the Younger, king of Sweden (approximate date)
- Robert de Mowbray, Norman Earl of Northumbria

1126

- February 18 – Otto II the Black, Moravian prince (b. 1085)
- March 8 – Urraca, queen regnant of León and Galicia (b. 1079)
- July 30 – Cecilia of Normandy (or Cecily), English princess
- September 1 – Świętosława of Poland, queen of Bohemia
- October 1 – Morphia of Melitene, queen of Jerusalem (or 1127)
- December 4 – Omar Khayyam, Persian mathematician (b. 1048)
- December 13 – Henry IX the Black, duke of Bavaria (b. 1075)
- December 29 – Wulfhilde of Saxony, duchess of Bavaria (b. 1072)
- Abu Bakr al-Turtushi, Andalusian political philosopher (b. 1059)
- Abu Nasr Ahmad ibn Fadl, Seljuk ruler (vizier) of Damascus
- Ahmad Ghazali, Persian mystic and writer (approximate date)
- Al-Tutili ("Blind Poet of Tudela"), Andalusian Muwallad poet
- Bertrand of Comminges, French bishop and saint (b. 1050)
- Cai Jing, Chinese politician and calligrapher (b. 1047)
- Edgar the Ætheling, uncrowned king of England (b. c. 1052)
- Ekkehard of Aura, German abbot, chronicler and writer
- Ragnvald Knaphövde, Swedish pretender (approximate date)
- Tong Guan, Chinese general and political adviser (b. 1054)
- Vikramaditya VI, king of the Western Chalukya Empire
- Waleran of Le Puiset, French nobleman (approximate date)
- Wynebald de Ballon, Norman nobleman (b. 1058)

1127

- February 7 – Ava (von Göttweig), German poet (b. 1060)
- February 10 – William IX ("the Troubador"), duke of Aquitaine (b. 1071)
- March 2 – Charles the Good, count of Flanders (b. 1084)
- March 23 – Ottone Frangipane, Italian Benedictine monk and saint (b. 1040)
- May 16 – Gens du Beaucet, French hermit and saint (b. 1104)
- July – William II, Norman duke of Apulia and Calabria (b. 1095)
- August 12 – Jordan of Ariano, Norman warrior and nobleman
- September 1 – Prince Álmos (or Almus), duke of Hungary and Croatia
- October 1 – Morphia of Melitene, queen consort of Jerusalem (or 1126)
- November 1 – Zhang Bangchang, ruler of Da Chu (b. 1081)
- November 12 – Godbald (or Godebald), bishop of Utrecht
- November 25 – Minamoto no Yoshimitsu, Japanese samurai (b. 1045)
- December 19 – Jordan II (or Giordano), prince of Capua
- Fujiwara no Hiroko, Japanese empress consort (b. 1036)
- Gilla Críst Ua Máel Eóin, Irish historian and abbot
- Gualfardo of Verona, Italian trader and hermit (b. 1070)
- William III ("the Child"), count of Burgundy (b. 1110)
- Zhu, Chinese empress of the Song dynasty (b. 1102)

1128

- January 1 – Albero I, prince-bishop of Liège (b. 1070)
- February 12 – Toghtekin, Turkish ruler of Damascus
- June 2 – Pier Leoni (Petrus Leo), Roman consul
- July 20 – Al-Ma'mun al-Bata'ihi, Fatimid vizier (b. c. 1086)
- July 28 – William Clito, count of Flanders (b. 1102)
- July – Warmund (or Gormond), patriarch of Jerusalem
- August 10 – Fujiwara no Kiyohira, Japanese samurai (b. 1056)
- September 5 – Ranulf Flambard, Norman bishop of Durham
- November 26 or 28 – Geoffrey Brito (or le Breton), archbishop of Rouen
- December 4 – Henry II, Margrave of the Nordmark, German nobleman (b. 1102)
- December 15 – Fulco I, Margrave of Milan, Lombard nobleman
- Abu Ibrahim ibn Barun, Andalusian Jewish rabbi
- Conaing Ua Beigléighinn, Irish monk and abbot
- Constantine I of Torres, judge (ruler) of Logudoro
- Fulcher of Chartres, French priest and chronicler (b. 1059)
- Ibn Tumart, Almoravid political leader (or 1130)
- Jimena Muñoz (or Muñiz), Spanish noblewoman
- Rogvolod Vseslavich (Boris), prince of Polotsk

1129

- January 23 – William Giffard, bishop of Winchester
- January 27 – Ranulf le Meschin, 3rd Earl of Chester (b. 1070)
- January 29 – Minamoto no Shunrai, Japanese poet (b. 1055)
- February 16 – Thoros I, Armenian prince (or 1130)
- February 17 – Constantine II, Armenian prince
- July 24 – Shirakawa, emperor of Japan (b. 1053)
- July 28 – Zhao Fu, emperor of the Song dynasty (b. 1127)
- November 21 – Nigel d'Aubigny, Norman nobleman
- December 30 – Roger of Cannae, Italian bishop (b. 1060)
- Athanasius VI bar Khamoro, patriarch of Antioch
- Cellach of Armagh (or Celsus), Irish archbishop (b. 1080)
- Fujiwara no Akinaka, Japanese nobleman (b. 1059)
- John Theristus, Italian Benedictine monk (b. 1049)
- Ramiro Sánchez, Spanish nobleman (or 1130)
- Richard Fitz Pons, Norman nobleman (b. 1080)
- Walter FitzRoger, Norman sheriff of Gloucester
- Zhao Mingcheng, Chinese politician (b. 1081)
