= 1121 =

1121 in various calendars
- Gregorian calendar: 1121; MCXXI
- Ab urbe condita: 1874
- Armenian calendar: 570; ԹՎ ՇՀ
- Assyrian calendar: 5871
- Balinese saka calendar: 1042–1043
- Bengali calendar: 527–528
- Berber calendar: 2071
- English Regnal year: 21 Hen. 1 – 22 Hen. 1
- Buddhist calendar: 1665
- Burmese calendar: 483
- Byzantine calendar: 6629–6630
- Chinese calendar: 庚子年 (Metal Rat); 3818 or 3611 — to — 辛丑年 (Metal Ox); 3819 or 3612
- Coptic calendar: 837–838
- Discordian calendar: 2287
- Ethiopian calendar: 1113–1114
- Hebrew calendar: 4881–4882
- Hindu calendars
- Vikram Samvat: 1177–1178
- Shaka Samvat: 1042–1043
- Kali Yuga: 4221–4222
- Holocene calendar: 11121
- Igbo calendar: 121–122
- Iranian calendar: 499–500
- Islamic calendar: 514–515
- Japanese calendar: Hōan 2 (保安２年)
- Javanese calendar: 1026–1027
- Julian calendar: 1121; MCXXI
- Korean calendar: 3454
- Minguo calendar: 791 before ROC 民前791年
- Nanakshahi calendar: −347
- Seleucid era: 1432/1433 AG
- Thai solar calendar: 1663–1664
- Tibetan calendar: ལྕགས་ཕོ་བྱི་བ་ལོ་ (male Iron-Rat); 1247 or 866 or 94 — to — ལྕགས་མོ་གླང་ལོ་ (female Iron-Ox); 1248 or 867 or 95

Year 1121 (MCXXI) was a common year starting on Saturday of the Julian calendar.

== Events ==
=== By place ===
==== Byzantine Empire ====
- Emperor John II Komnenos recovers southwestern Anatolia (modern Turkey) from the Seljuk Turks and then hastens to the Balkans, where the Pechenegs are continuing their incursions. He transfers Byzantine troops to the Danube frontier at Paristrion.

==== Levant ====
- Summer – Seljuk forces under Toghtekin make extensive raids into Galilee. King Baldwin II of Jerusalem, in reprisal, crosses the Jordan River with a Crusader army and ravages the countryside. He occupies and destroys a fortress that Toghtekin has built at Jerash.

==== Europe ====
- March 2 – Petronilla of Lorraine becomes regent of Holland (Low Countries) after her husband, Floris II ("the Fat") dies. He is succeeded by his 6-year-old son Dirk VI (Theodoric).
- A large rebellion takes place in Córdoba (modern Spain) against the ruling Almoravid dynasty.

==== England ====
- January 24 – Adeliza of Louvain, age 17, marries King Henry I of England two months after the accidental death of the heir to the English throne, Henry's only legitimate son, William Adelin.

==== Eurasia ====
- Summer – Sultan Mahmud II of the Seljuk Empire declares a Holy War on the Kingdom of Georgia. He sends an expedition under Ilghazi, the Artukid ruler of Mardin, to invade the country.
- August 12 – Battle of Didgori: King David IV ("the Builder") of Georgia with a Georgian army of 55,600 men) defeats the 300,000-strong Seljuk coalition forces at Mount Didgori.
- The much larger Seljuk army is heavily defeated; Georgia is unified and independence is achieved from Muslim authority. King David IV lays siege and captures Tbilisi later in the year assigning it as his capital.

==== Asia ====
- Emperor Emperor Huizong of Song sends an expedition to crush the rebellion at Hangzhou (modern-day Zhejiang) in China. The rebels are defeated and their leader Fang La is captured and executed.

=== By topic ===
==== Religion ====
- Spring – Peter Abelard, a French theologian and philosopher, is condemned and charged with the heresy of Sabellius in a synod at Soissons. Abelard writes Sic et Non.
- April 22 – Antipope Gregory VIII (supported by Emperor Henry V) is arrested by papal troops at Sutri. He is taken to Rome and imprisoned in the Septizonium.
- December 25 (Christmas Day) – The Praemonstratensian Order (Norbertines) is formed, when a group of canons make solemn vows at Prémontré.
- Henry I founds Reading Abbey in England. The Cluniac Order populates the abbey.
- The third and largest church is completed at Cluny Abbey (modern France).
- L'Aumône Abbey is founded by Count Theobald IV of Blois at Loir-et-Cher.

== Births ==
- Ascelina, French Cistercian nun and mystic (d. 1195)
- Chōgen, Japanese Buddhist monk (kanjin) (d. 1206)
- Henry of France, archbishop of Reims (d. 1175)
- Joscelin of Louvain, Flemish nobleman (d. 1180)
- Kojijū, Japanese noblewoman and poet (d. 1202)

== Deaths ==
- January 7 – Erminold, German Benedictine abbot
- January 18 – William of Champeaux, French philosopher
- February 10 – Domnall Ua Lochlainn, Irish king (b. 1048)
- March 2 – Floris II ("the Fat"), count of Holland (b. 1085)
- April 23 – Jón Ögmundsson, Icelandic bishop (b. 1052)
- August 7 – Ulrich I of Passau (or Udalrich), German bishop
- December 11 – Al-Afdal Shahanshah, Fatimid caliph (b. 1066)
- December 13 – Ulrich of Eppenstein, German abbot
- Abd al-Aziz ibn Mansur, Hammadid governor and ruler
- Alfanus II (or Alfano), Lombard archbishop of Salerno
- Al-Tughrai, Persian official, poet and alchemist (b. 1061)
- Bartolf Leslie (or Bartholomew), Scottish nobleman
- Fang La, Chinese rebel leader (executed in Kaifeng)
- Frederick of Liege, German prince-bishop and saint
- Lü Shinang, Chinese religious leader (Manichaean cult)
- Masud Sa'd Salman, Persian poet (approximate date)
- Muireadhach Ua Flaithbheartaigh, Irish king of Iar Connacht
- Robert of Bounalbergo, Norman nobleman and crusader
- Zhou Bangyan, Chinese bureaucrat and ci poet (b. 1056)
- Zhou Tong, Chinese archery teacher and martial artist
