= Ragnvald of Sweden =

Ragnvald of Sweden may refer to:

- Ragnvald Knaphövde, Swedish king around 1125
- Ragnvald, Swedish prince around 1100, son of King Inge the Elder
