= Inge II =

Inge II may refer to:

- Inge II of Sweden, Ingold Halstensson, also called Inge the Younger, king of Sweden in 1110–1125
- Inge II of Norway, Inge Baardson (1185–1217)
