= Ragnhild of Tälje =

Ragnhild of Tälje (11th century – c. 1117) is a saint whose veneration is attested in late medieval Sweden and whose name is especially associated with the church in Södertälje in the province of Södermanland and the diocese of Strängnäs. A year given for her death is 1117. According to mentions in various literature a few centuries later, she was also Queen of Sweden as the wife of King Inge the Younger. Some historians have introduced a possibility, refuted by others, that Ragnhild's father was Alstan, a son of Folke Filbyter, and that she thus belonged to the early House of Bjälbo of subsequent Swedish and Norwegian kings.

Ragnhild is said to have founded the church in Södertälje and be buried there. If she is a historical person, she probably lived during the late 11th or early 12th century, but no sources that mention her can be dated earlier than the 15th century. An epitaph in the church, probably dating from that period, was later copied by the late 17th century antiquarian Elias Palmskiöld. In various 15th century literary sources, she is claimed to have been a queen, the daughter of a certain Halsten (it is uncertain whether the king Halsten Stenkilsson is intended) and wife of either Inge the Elder or Inge the Younger (either of which would for genealogical and chronological reasons contradict her being the daughter of King Halsten). 14th and 15th century wall paintings depicting Ragnhild can be found in the churches of Börje and Viksta in Uppland, and Enånger in Hälsingland, all three in the archdiocese of Uppsala.

== Legacy ==
Queen Ragnhild stylized in the arms of Södertälje

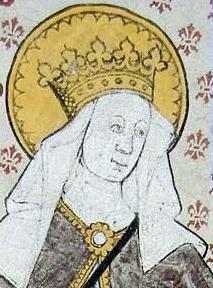
14th-century wall painting at Enånger of Queen Ragnhild

Interest in Ragnhild (as in some other medieval local saints) was revived long after the Protestant Reformation through the general interest in Swedish antiquities that flourished in 17th century Sweden. In her case, the publication of Vitis aquilonia by Johannes Vastovius in 1623 had already caused a re-interpretation of the human figure in the seal of the City of Södertälje to be a stylistic depiction of Ragenilda.

Her cult image includes a pilgrimage to Rome and Jerusalem where she was undressed by bandits and left naked, but by angels was sent a magnificent cloak. It also mentions her marriage to King Inge and her virtues as queen, but that he left her. She could then devote herself to caring for the ill.

For the introduction of Christianity in Södermanland in the decades around 1100, Ragnhild has been supposed to be one of the three instrumental people, the earlier being Saint Eskil and later Saint Botvid. Eskil's and Botvid's legends, however, were contemporary (12th century). Ragnhild is not mentioned specifically until the 1450s in the Little Rhyme Chronicles, and then in the newer preface of a 1520s reissue of the Eric Chronicle from 1335. Peringskiöld provided evidence that the original epitaph on Ragnhlid's grave, describing her as a queen, had been transcribed correctly in subsequent centuries. Obvious similarities in style between Ragnhild's epitaph and that of the early 12th century sarcophagus of St. Botvid's brother Beorn in Botkyrka have led to an additional theory of the authenticity of the former.

From that epitaph:

Ragnhild, ruler of the Swedes, a flower with no thorn, a queen for a realm, she goes out on a pilgrimage to Rome and Jerusalem to assure herself of graceful hope and to bear the Cross's victorious and for-all-collective tag of honor. Through service she desires to acquire for herself the merciful laurel wreath of Helen. Oh, pious Madame, the patron saint of Tälje residents, pray for us for the good, heavenly gifts of Christ.

A legend about her by King Sigismund's librarian and court priest has Ragnhild brought up from childhood fearing God, then married to Inge, living an angelic life on earth, dead of old age in 1120 and buried in Södertälje.

When Södertälje got a new city hall in 1965, a memorial plaque to Queen Ragnhild, authored by the town's mayor in 1753, was moved to the new building and placed in its courtroom.
