= Kakwkylla =

Middle Ages local saint

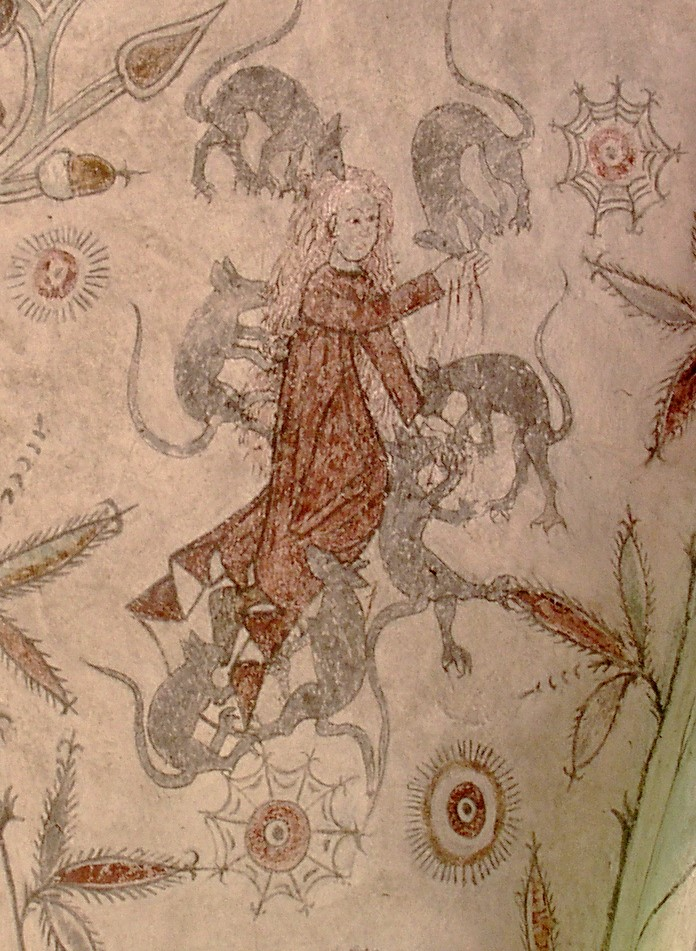
- Depiction of Kakwkylla in Kaga Church, Sweden
- Venerated in: Sweden, Germany
- Attributes: Rats and mice
- Patronage: Protects against rats and mice

Kakwkylla was a local saint venerated in Sweden and Germany under a wide range of names during the Late Middle Ages. She served as protector against rats and mice. Her cult probably originated as a misnomer for the Irish saint Columba, apparently combined with misappropriated traits of Gertrude of Nivelles. In Sweden, where Columba was not widely venerated nor Gertrude of Nivelles associated with rats, Kakwkylla appears to have played a more independent role.

== Depictions, name and origins ==
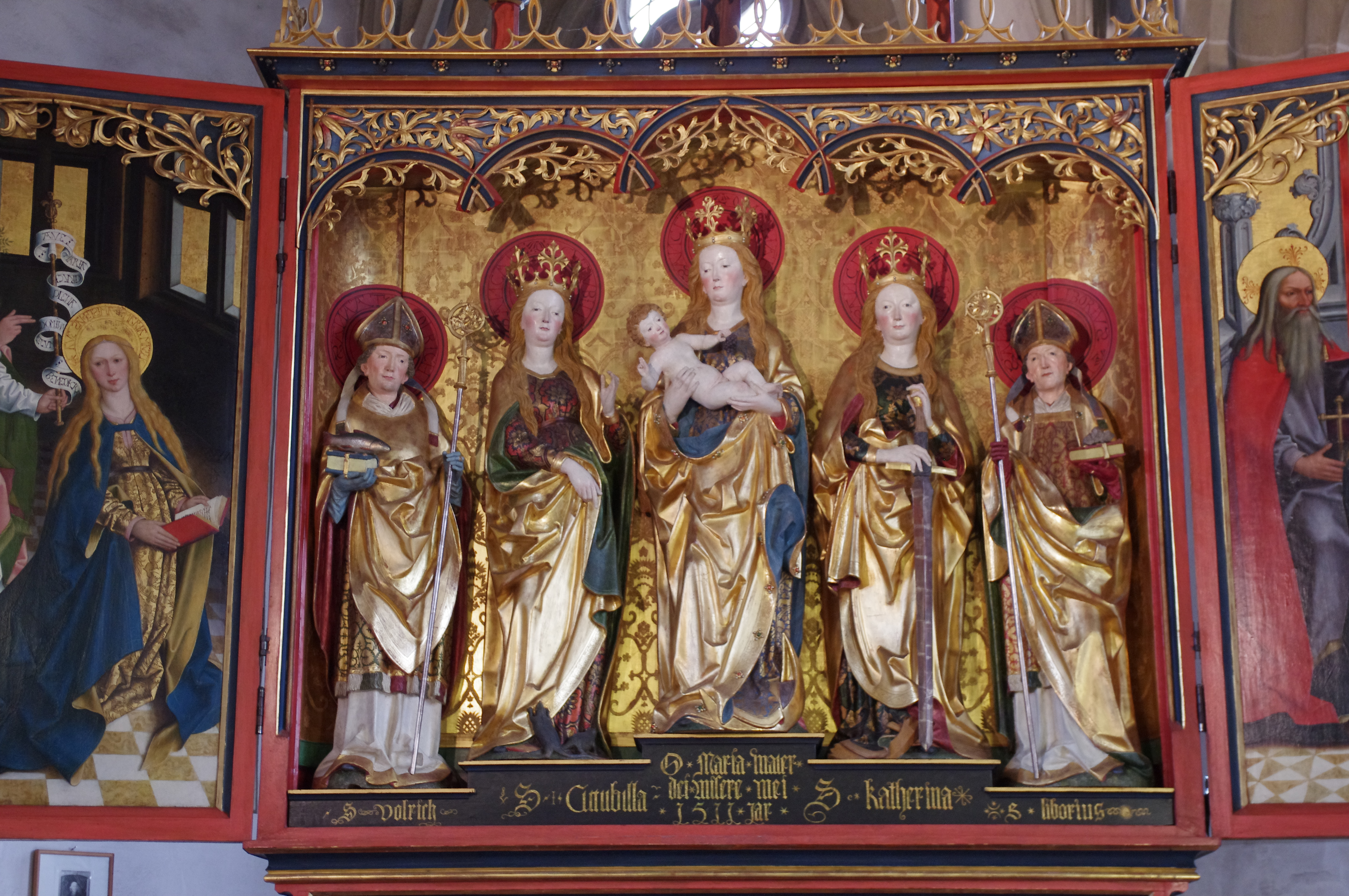
Depiction of the saint (second from left) from the monastery in Adelberg, Germany

Late medieval depictions of a female saint, typically equipped with a spindle and spinning, and with rats either on the thread, on the saint or in the surroundings, are known from the Swedish churches of Film, Forssa (vanished), Harg, Kaga, Njutånger as well as possibly Viksta, and Hattula in Finland. Some of these also have speech scrolls identifying the saint. Similar depictions are also known from Germany, including on an altarpiece in the monastery of Adelberg, Baden-Württemberg under the name Cutubilla. A woodcut from the middle of the 15th century in the Kupferstichkabinett in Berlin also depicts the saint, and may indeed be indicative of how depictions of her were spread to Sweden, using early printing techniques. A large number of variations of the saint's name are known. From Sweden, the forms Kakwkylla, Kacacila, Kakitkaina, K(akuk)olla (possibly), and Katakyla (possibly) are known. From German sources, the names Cakukilla, Cutubilla (or Cutubilla von Württemberg), Kakukabilla, Kakukilla and Kukakille have been identified.

In a German context, the saint may have originated due to being confused with Columba, an Irish abbot and missionary to Scotland, venerated as a saint. His name may have been locally interpreted as a female name, and variants known from the 14th century (Columquillus) indicate that distortions similar to the known names of the Swedish-German saint existed. A medieval prayer to Columba against fire also shows similarities to one of the known prayers to Kakwkylla; the Kakwkylla prayer may be a distorted version of the prayer to Columba. Furthermore, Columba is known to have been referred to also as Colum Cille, Kolumkilla and Kolumbilla during the Middle Ages. On the other hand, no known myths or legends associate Columba with rats, although a legend tells that Columba made the snakes on Iona lose their venom, and he may therefore have been seen as a protector against vermin in general.

Because of the lack of direct links between Columba and protection against rats, another theory posits that the saint in Germany was a mix-up with Gertrude of Nivelles, a female saint who had an association with rats and was occasionally depicted with rats as an attribute. Possibly, a combination of the two misunderstandings created the saint: the name was taken from Columba while the legend and patronage from Gertrude of Nivelles.

From Germany the veneration of the saint most probably spread to Sweden. Just how the saint reached Sweden is unknown, though she was probably not known there before 1500. In Sweden, she seems to have been venerated as an independent saint in her own right. There is no medieval evidence that Columba was ever venerated in Sweden, and the known depictions of Gertrude of Nivelle typically depict her with another attribute; it's therefore unlikely that Kakwkylla was the result of a confusion with other saints.

== Veneration ==
A manuscript from the 16th century found in Linköping (Sweden) contains two prayers directed to Kakwkylla (using that name) for protection against rats and mice. In one of them, a brief description of the saint states that she was a virgin and was eaten alive by rats and mice while imprisoned. From these prayers it can also be deduced that the cult was sanctioned (at least locally) by the church, since they contain descriptions of the priest leading the mass in her honour and displaying a statue of her. It is not known for how long the cult of Kakwkylla endured; in general the Reformation, begun in 1527 in Sweden, led to the end of the veneration of saints. In Germany it seems to have endured longer, although it never became widespread. The date of veneration of Kakwkylla was 10 March.

== Bibliography ==
- Åmark, Mats (1935). "Sankta Kakwkylla: spår av ett hemlighetsfullt helgon från vårt medeltida ärkestift" [Saint Kakwkylla: traces of a mysterious saint from our medieval archdiocese] (PDF). Fornvännen. Journal of Swedish Antiquarian Research (in Swedish and German): 356–365. Archived from the original (PDF) on 29 June 2016.
- Drexler, W (1898). "Noch einmal Sancta Kakukakilla-Cutubilla" [Sancta Kakukakilla-Cutubilla once again]. Zeitschrift des Vereins für Volkskunde (in German): 341–342.
- Odenius, Oloph (1949). "En notis om S:ta Kakwkylla" [A note about St. Kakwkylla] (PDF). Credo. Katolsk Tidskrift (in Swedish) (2): 135–137.
- af Ugglas, Carl R. (1939). "Ännu några ord om "Sancta kakukylla"" [A few more words about "Sancta kakukylla"] (PDF). Fornvännen. Journal of Swedish Antiquarian Research (in Swedish): 180–184. Archived from the original (PDF) on 8 September 2021.
- Zingerle, Ignaz (1892). "Zur Sancta Kakukabilla-Cutubilla" [To Sancta Kakukabilla-Cutubilla]. Zeitschrift des Vereins für Volkskunde (in German): 199–201.
