= Eriksgata =

Route of the Eriksgata

Eriksgata (i.e. "Erik's Road") was the tour traditionally taken in the Middle Ages by a newly-elected Swedish king through the important provinces of the realm to have his election confirmed by the local assemblies. The actual election took place at the Stone of Mora in Uppland and participation was originally restricted to the people in Uppland or Svealand, hence the need for having the election confirmed by the other regions. The Eriksgata gradually lost its influence when representatives from almost all parts of Sweden participated in the election at the stone of Mora from the 14th century. After 1544, the Swedish King was no longer elected, and instead inherited his throne. This meant that the Eriksgata thereafter had only symbolic importance. The last King to travel the Eriksgata according to the old law was Charles IX (1604-1611). Later Kings of Sweden have made visits to Swedish provinces and called them an "Eriksgata", but those visits have no resemblance to the old medieval tradition.

The earliest reference of an Eriksgata is probably from Saxo Grammaticus who c. 1200 wrote about the struggle for the Swedish crown in the 1120s in his Gesta Danorum. But the tradition is probably much older than that.

The Eriksgata journey was not without risks since there is at least one example of a King being killed during his Eriksgata. This is the incident from the 1120s recorded by Saxo Grammaticus and also in an appendix to the Västgöta law. According to these sources, the newly elected King Ragnvald Knaphövde carelessly decided not to take along the customary hostages from prominent local families while travelling through Västergötland, even though a rival candidate for the throne had gained support in the province. According to Västgötalagen Ragnvald's decision was taken as an insult to the people of Västergötland, since it showed that he did not fear them, and they killed him in Karlepitt (an unknown location in Västergötland).
