= 1124 =

1124 in various calendars
- Gregorian calendar: 1124; MCXXIV
- Ab urbe condita: 1877
- Armenian calendar: 573; ԹՎ ՇՀԳ
- Assyrian calendar: 5874
- Balinese saka calendar: 1045–1046
- Bengali calendar: 530–531
- Berber calendar: 2074
- English Regnal year: 24 Hen. 1 – 25 Hen. 1
- Buddhist calendar: 1668
- Burmese calendar: 486
- Byzantine calendar: 6632–6633
- Chinese calendar: 癸卯年 (Water Rabbit); 3821 or 3614 — to — 甲辰年 (Wood Dragon); 3822 or 3615
- Coptic calendar: 840–841
- Discordian calendar: 2290
- Ethiopian calendar: 1116–1117
- Hebrew calendar: 4884–4885
- Hindu calendars
- Vikram Samvat: 1180–1181
- Shaka Samvat: 1045–1046
- Kali Yuga: 4224–4225
- Holocene calendar: 11124
- Igbo calendar: 124–125
- Iranian calendar: 502–503
- Islamic calendar: 517–518
- Japanese calendar: Hōan 5 / Tenji 1 (天治元年)
- Javanese calendar: 1029–1030
- Julian calendar: 1124; MCXXIV
- Korean calendar: 3457
- Minguo calendar: 788 before ROC 民前788年
- Nanakshahi calendar: −344
- Seleucid era: 1435/1436 AG
- Thai solar calendar: 1666–1667
- Tibetan calendar: ཆུ་མོ་ཡོས་ལོ་ (female Water-Hare); 1250 or 869 or 97 — to — ཤིང་ཕོ་འབྲུག་ལོ་ (male Wood-Dragon); 1251 or 870 or 98

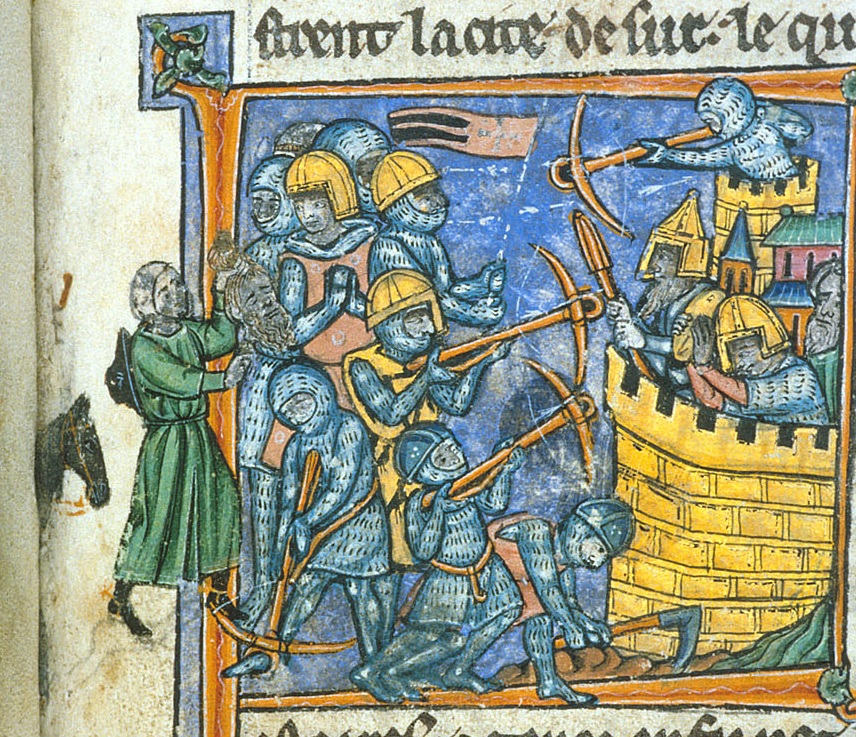
July 7: Tyre surrenders to the Crusaders

Year 1124 (MCXXIV) was a leap year starting on Tuesday of the Julian calendar, the 1124th year of the Common Era (CE) and Anno Domini (AD) designations, the 124th year of the 2nd millennium, the 24th year of the 12th century, and the 5th year of the 1120s decade.

== January – March ==
- January – Belek Ghazi, Bey of Artuqids, and Toghtekin, Emir of Damascus, have breached the defenses of Azaz (northwest of Aleppo in Syria but are repulsed by Crusaders.
- February 15 – the Venetians and the Franks began the siege of the seaport of Tyre, now in Lebanon, ruled by Toghtekin, the atabeg of Damascus. The Christian army was led by the Patriarch of Antioch, the doge of Venice, Count Pons of Tripoli and William de Bury, the king's constable.
- March 26 – Henry I of England's forces defeated the Norman rebels at the Battle of Bourgthéroulde.

== April – June ==
- April 27 – David I succeeds Alexander I as the King of Scotland.
- May 6 – Belek Ghazi, Bey of Artuqids was hit and killed by an arrow during the siege of Manbij.
- June 6 –German missionary Otto of Bamberg carried out the first baptism on his mission to convert the residents of the Duchy of Pomerania (now in Poland) to Christianity, carrying out a baptism in Pyritz (now Pyrzyce)
- June – Toghtekin, the atabeg of Damascus, sent envoys to the Crusaders encampment to negotiate peace. After lengthy and difficult discussions, it was agreed that the terms of surrender would include letting those who wanted to leave the city take their families and property with them. Meanwhile those who wanted to stay must keep their houses and possessions. This was unpopular with some of the crusaders, who wanted to loot the city.

== July – September ==
- July 7 (June 29 O.S.)(14 Jumada 518 AH – Tyre fell on the hands of the Crusaders.
- July 27; Thu'ban ibn Muhammad was appointed as the new Turkish governor of Aleppo by the Fatimid caliph, al-Zahir li-I'zaz Din Allah.
- August 11 – A solar eclipse took place over northern Europe, after Sigurd the Crusader, King of Norway, led the Kalmare ledung, a naval attack on Kalmar, in order to Christianize the region of Småland. A historian later noted that Sigurd's crusade happened in the summer before "the great darkness".
- August 29 – Baldwin II of Jerusalem is released by Timurtash. After negotiations are made, with the Crusaders paying 80,000 dinars and to cede Atarib, Zardana, Azaz and other Antiochene fortresses to Timurtash. Baldwin also promises to assist Timurtash against the Bedouin warlord, Dubays ibn Sadaqa. Once 20,000 dinars are paid and a dozen hostages (including Baldwin's youngest daughter Ioveta and Joscelin's son Joscelin II) are handed over to Timurtash to secure the payment of the balance, Baldwin is released.
- September – After agreeing to help Timurtash fight a rival, the Amir Dubays bin Sadaqa, as a condition of being released, King Baldwin II of Jerusalem enters into an alliance with Dubays and promises him parts of the territory of Aleppo. Timurtash asks for help from his brother Suleiman of Mayyafariqin, but the two brothers fail to get along, leaving Aleppo vulnerable.

== October – December ==
- October 6 – The siege of Aleppo by Baldwin II of Jerusalem and his allies begins. The fortress surrenders after less than four months, on January 25.
- November 1 – Beltrán de Risnel confirms two charters of issued by King Alfonso VII during the reign of Queen Urraca of León and Castile.
- November 5 – Gutierre Fernández de Castro and his wife Toda receive half of the lands owned by her grandmother, Teresa, at Quintanilla Rodano, Quintana Fortuno and Sotopalacios.
- November 19 – Archbishop Adelbert I of Mainz acknowledges ownership by Odo of the Abbey of Saint-Remi in Reims, as wellas the churches around Kusel, of the Church of Kusel, Altenglan, Konken and Pfeffelbach.
- December 9 – Raymond du Puy of France formally succeeds Gerard as the second Grand Master of the Knights Hospitaller and issues his first official act.
- December 16 – 1124 papal election: Teobaldo Boccapecci is elected the new Pope, three days after the death of Pope Callixtus II. Boccapecci takes the name Celestine II, but the Frangipani family attacks the investment ceremony and Boccapecci is injured. He resigns before being enthroned in order to avoid schism.
- December 21 – 1124 papal election: Lamberto Scannabecchi is elected Pope after Teobaldo Boccapecci is rejected. Scannabecchi takes the name Pope Honorius II.

== Religion ==
=== Europe ===
- Gaufrid is consecrated as the first Abbot of Dunfermline Abbey.
- The Dun Beal Gallimhe is erected by King Tairrdelbach Ua Conchobair of Connacht.
- In Ireland, Saint Malachy, the great reformer of the Church, is made a bishop.
- (Approximate date) – The High School of Glasgow is founded as the choir school of Glasgow Cathedral, in Scotland.

=== North America ===
- Arnald becomes the first Bishop of Greenland.

== Births ==
- Ottokar III of Styria, Margrave (d. 1164)
- Possible date – Eleanor of Aquitaine, Duchess of Aquitaine, queen consort successively of France and England, and patron of the arts (d. 1204)

== Deaths ==
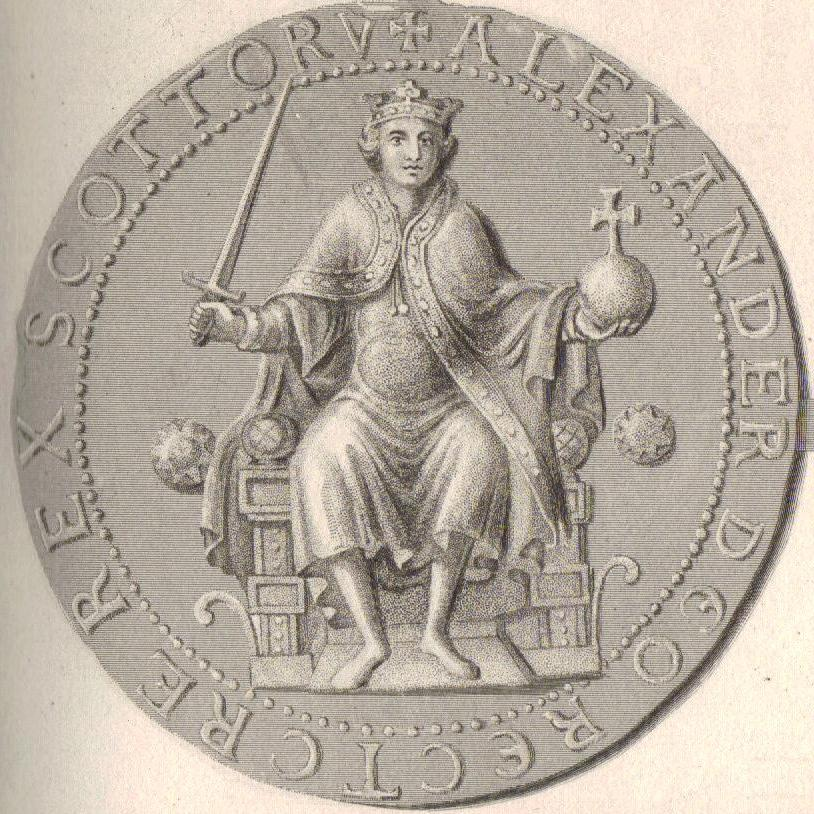
Alexander I of Scotland

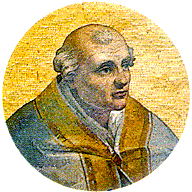
Pope Callixtus II

- February 2 – Bořivoj II, Duke of Bohemia (b. c. 1064)
- March 15 – Ernulf, Bishop of Rochester (b. c. 1040)
- April 23 – King Alexander I of Scotland (b. c. 1078)
- June 12 – Hasan-i Sabbah, founder of the Nizari Ismaili state (b. c. 1250)
- June 24 – Nicholas of Worcester, prior of the Benedictine priory of Worcester Cathedral
- December 13 – Pope Callixtus II, Burgundian-born Catholic religious leader (b. c. 1065)
- Guibert of Nogent, French historian and theologian (b. 1053)
