= 1195 =

1195 in various calendars
- Gregorian calendar: 1195; MCXCV
- Ab urbe condita: 1948
- Armenian calendar: 644; ԹՎ ՈԽԴ
- Assyrian calendar: 5945
- Balinese saka calendar: 1116–1117
- Bengali calendar: 601–602
- Berber calendar: 2145
- English Regnal year: 6 Ric. 1 – 7 Ric. 1
- Buddhist calendar: 1739
- Burmese calendar: 557
- Byzantine calendar: 6703–6704
- Chinese calendar: 甲寅年 (Wood Tiger); 3892 or 3685 — to — 乙卯年 (Wood Rabbit); 3893 or 3686
- Coptic calendar: 911–912
- Discordian calendar: 2361
- Ethiopian calendar: 1187–1188
- Hebrew calendar: 4955–4956
- Hindu calendars
- Vikram Samvat: 1251–1252
- Shaka Samvat: 1116–1117
- Kali Yuga: 4295–4296
- Holocene calendar: 11195
- Igbo calendar: 195–196
- Iranian calendar: 573–574
- Islamic calendar: 591–592
- Japanese calendar: Kenkyū 6 (建久６年)
- Javanese calendar: 1102–1103
- Julian calendar: 1195; MCXCV
- Korean calendar: 3528
- Minguo calendar: 717 before ROC 民前717年
- Nanakshahi calendar: −273
- Seleucid era: 1506/1507 AG
- Thai solar calendar: 1737–1738
- Tibetan calendar: ཤིང་ཕོ་སྟག་ལོ་ (male Wood-Tiger); 1321 or 940 or 168 — to — ཤིང་མོ་ཡོས་ལོ་ (female Wood-Hare); 1322 or 941 or 169

Year 1195 (MCXCV) was a common year starting on Sunday of the Julian calendar.

== Events ==
- June 1 – Battle of Shamkor: Georgians defeat the Ildenizids of Azerbaijan.
- July 18 – Battle of Alarcos: Almohad ruler Abu Yusuf Ya'qub al-Mansur decisively defeats Castilian King Alfonso VIII.
- The Priory of St Mary's is founded in Bushmead.
- Alexius III Angelus overthrows Isaac II, and becomes Byzantine Emperor.
- Temüjin, in alliance with the Jin dynasty of China, launches his first major campaign against the Tatars. This military action marks a new, formalized phase in Temüjin's rise to power and his ongoing unification of the various steppe tribes.
- The Abbasid Caliph, Al-Nasir, takes military action against the Ayyubid Sultan, Al-Aziz Uthman, who controls Egypt and Syria. The Caliph mobilizes his forces and marches into Mesopotamia, directly challenging Ayyubid authority in the region of Iraq.

== Births ==
- August 15 – Anthony of Padua, Portuguese preacher and saint (d. 1231)
- Princess Shōshi of Japan (d. 1211)
- Roger de Quincy, 2nd Earl of Winchester (d. 1265)

== Deaths ==
- March 3 – Hugh de Puiset, bishop of Durham (b. c. 1125)
- August 6 – Henry the Lion, Duke of Saxony and Bavaria (b. 1129)
- October 13 – Gualdim Pais, Great Master of the Templars in Portugal (b. 1118)
- December 17 – Baldwin V, Count of Hainaut (b. 1150)
- Ascelina, French nun and mystic (b. 1121)
