= Harg Church =

Medieval church in Stockholm County, Sweden

Coordinates: 60°11′14″N 18°23′29″E

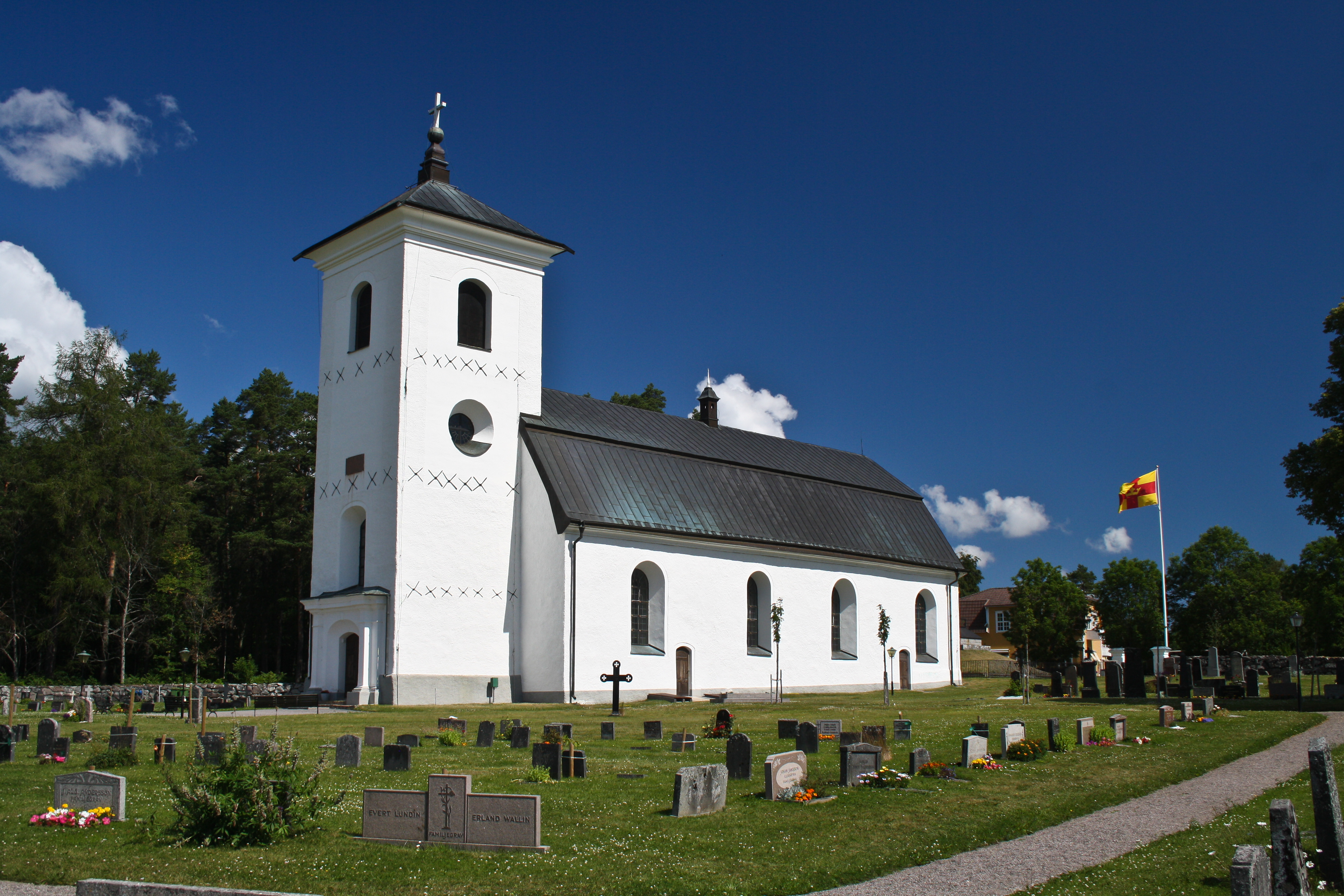
Harg Church, view of the exterior

Harg Church (Swedish: Hargs kyrka) is a medieval church in Stockholm County, Sweden. It is part of the Archdiocese of Uppsala (Church of Sweden).

== History and architecture ==
Although built in the 15th century, the church derives its present appearance from a major reconstruction which was carried out in the 18th century. The tower also is not medieval; it dates from 1781 and replaced an earlier church porch. Inside, the church still contains frescos from the 1514, including a large fresco depicting the archangel Michael and the unusual Saint Kakwkylla. The oldest item in the church is the 14th century triumphal cross; most other furnishings date from the 18th century.
