= Ó Begléighinn =

Ó Beigléighinn (Irish pronunciation: [ˈbʲɛɟlʲeːn̠ʲ]), anglicised Beglin, was the name of a hereditary medical family of County Longford.

== Etymology ==
Ó Beigléighinn is translated as "descendant of a little scholar" by Woulfe. The name is composed of Ó / Ua "descendant" and Beigléighinn "of Beigléighinn" (genitive case). Beigléighinn is defined as "ill-educated" by Dinneen. The Ó Begléighinn family were a hereditary medical families of mediaeval Ireland.

The surname name should not be confused with the other Irish surname Begley which derives from the Irish name Ó Beaglaoich (meaning beag "little" laoich "hero"), which are a different Sept from Donegal.

== Origins ==
The Irish surname Beglin / Beglan is a rare name of Counties Meath, Westmeath and County Longford situated in the Irish Midlands, in the province of Leinster, originally these counties was situated in the province of Meath. The Ó Beigléighinn were a sept of the Clann Tellach Cearbhallan, of Conmaicne Rein in Bréifne.

The first recorded spelling to be found of the surname Beglin in the history of Ireland is recorded in The Annals of the Four Masters in AD 1128 and is shown to be that of "Conaing Ua Beigléighinn, Abbot of Ceanannus, died in this year". Who was a Columbian monk from the Abbey in County Meath where the most beautiful of medieval manuscripts of Gospels, The Book of Kells was held in safe keeping before finally being moved to its new home in Trinity College Dublin.

Coarb Conaing Ua Beigléighinn seems to have been the 43rd for successorship of Saint Colm Cille between AD 1117–1128 . The title "Coarb" meaning "heir" or "successor of" was given to the head of the monastery following the rule of the Colm Cille. The title "Fer Léighinn" or "Vir lectionis" in Latin, was a title bestowed for teaching of penmanship and of the holy scriptures.

The surname Ó Beigléighinn is documented secondly with "Maurice O'Beglin" in The Annals of Loch Cé in A.D 1528: "Muiris, son of Donnchadh O Beigléighinn, an adept in medicine, who died this year". His death was also recorded in The Annals of Connacht as "Muiris son of Donnchadh O'Beigléighinn, an eminent physician, died with unction and penance".

"Measgrá Dantra" is a book which contains a 13th-century poem about a Franciscan friars exile's thoughts on his native land, attributed to Tadhg Comchosach O Dálaigh. The last word of the opening line is Begléighinn – "Dá grádh do fhágbhas Eirinn im bráthair bhocht Beigléighinn".

Rev. Patrick Beglin was one of the Seven Wonders of Fore. Legend states that in County Westmeath in Ireland, on a hillside above the old church of St. Fechin is a tiny chapel, the Anchorites church, an extension to a cell once occupied by hermits until the 17th century. Tradition states that the last hermit in Ireland was Patrick Beglin, who had stayed here living a life of a hermit for religious reasons and is commemorated on a stone tablet in the cell dated AD 1616.

== People with the surname ==
- Conaing Ua Beigléighinn
- Muiris Ó Begléighinn

== Later Beglins ==
The prefixes Ó or Ua of surnames was widely dropped following the conquests of Ireland during the 16th-17th centuries, when English rule became effective and most Irish surnames had to become Anglicised under penal law. From the early 1800s, however, many began to revive the use of O' (rather than Ó) and Mac in their surnames, becoming especially popular in the time of the Gaelic League, and Irish independence as a free state.

The Ó Begléighinns were located principally in Counties Meath, Westmeath and Longford, where it can be found today. The various spellings of the surname are Beigleign, Beigleinn, Beglin, Beglan, Begline, Beglen, Begnal, Biglen, Beglain, Begllin and Beglane.

Some more notable Beglins in more recent times there is the former Irish international footballer and present day sports commentator for RTÉ Jim Beglin, the former field hockey player Beth Beglin of the United States of America who represented her country in the women's national team in the 1984 Summer Olympics and again 4 years later in Seoul.
