= Conaing Ua Beigléighinn =

Irish cleric

Conaing Ua Beigléighinn, Irish cleric, died 1128.

The Annals of The Four Masters, sub anno 1128, state that Conaing Ua Beigléighinn, Abbot of Ceanannus, died in this year. Ua Beigléighinn was a monk in what is now County Meath. At the time, the abbey possessed the Book of Kells. He was the 43rd Coarb or successor of Saint Columba, becoming abbot in 1117.

Conaing Ua Beigléighinn may have been the founder of the surname Ó Beigléighinn; the surname means little (medical) scholar - the honourable title “Fer Léighinn” or “Vir lectionis” was a title of bestowed upon monks for their teaching of penmanship - denoting that he was a descendant of a little scholar of Kells Abbey, a scholar, who may have been a previous Abbot at Kells Abbey.

The surname is now rendered as Beglin.

== See also ==
- Muiris Ó Begléighinn
