= Gualfardo of Verona =

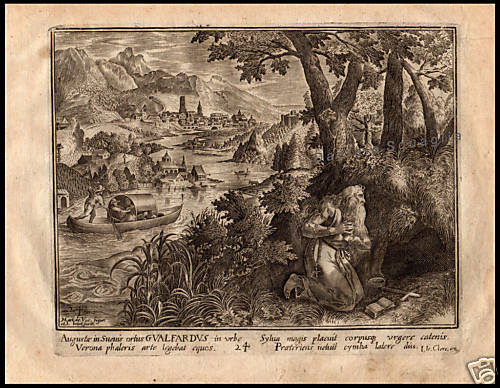
Gualfardo of Verona by I. Brint (1620)

Gualfardo of Verona (or Wolfhard of Augsburg) (1070–1127) was a Swabian artisan, trader, and hermit who lived around Verona. A hagiographical vita (biography) was composed, according to the Bollandists, within decades of his death, probably towards the end of the twelfth century. In the early sixteenth century he was venerated as the patron saint of the harnessmakers' guild at Verona.

Gualfardo was born in Augsburg, the chief city of Swabia at the time. In 1096 he was on a pilgrimage—German Wallfahrer means pilgrim, whence his Italian name—from Augsburg "with some journeyman merchants", according to his vita. He stopped in Verona, where he lived for a time with a journeyman, though he was a master harnessmaker by trade. Of this brief period his vita says: In eodem vero loco beatissimus Gualfardus in sellarum exercitio (nam optimus sellator erat) parvo tempore moratus (in that very place the most blessed Gualfardo worked on saddles [for the best saddler he was] but for a short time). He eventually settled in a dense forest on the Adige not far from Verona. There he lived for twenty years before he was found by hunters, who brought him back to Verona. He established a shop near the abbey of San Salvatore, but during a flood he left the city again and built a hermit's cell near the church of Santa Trinità in the countryside nearby. Until his death he was well sought after by the Veronese for his miracles. He does not seem to have been an especial aid to travelers, though his love of solitude did not interfere with his hospitality to city-dwellers, who also brought him food. He died at Curte-Regia near Verona in 1127.
