= Battle of Chlumec =

The Battle of Chlumec or Kulm may refer to:

- possible Battle at Chlumec (1040) at Chlumec near Ústí nad Labem
- 1126 battle during the War of Bohemian Succession (1125–1140) near Ústí nad Labem
- 1775 Battle of Chlumec nad Cidlinou near Hradec Králové, ending a peasant revolt
- 1813 Battle of Kulm near Ústí nad Labem, where Napoleon's army was defeated
