= Muiris Ó Begléighinn =

Irish physician

Muiris Ó Begléighinn (died 1528) was an Irish physician.

The Annals of Connacht, sub anno 1528, record his obit.

Muiris son of Donnchad O Begleighinn, an eminent physician, died, with Unction and Penance.

The Annals of Loch Cé for the same year records Muiris, son of Donnchadh Ó Beigléighinn, an adept in medicine, who died this year.

The surname is now generally rendered as Beglan or Beglin.

== See also ==
- Ó Begléighinn
