= Viksta Church =

Coordinates: 60°04′38″N 17°38′21″E

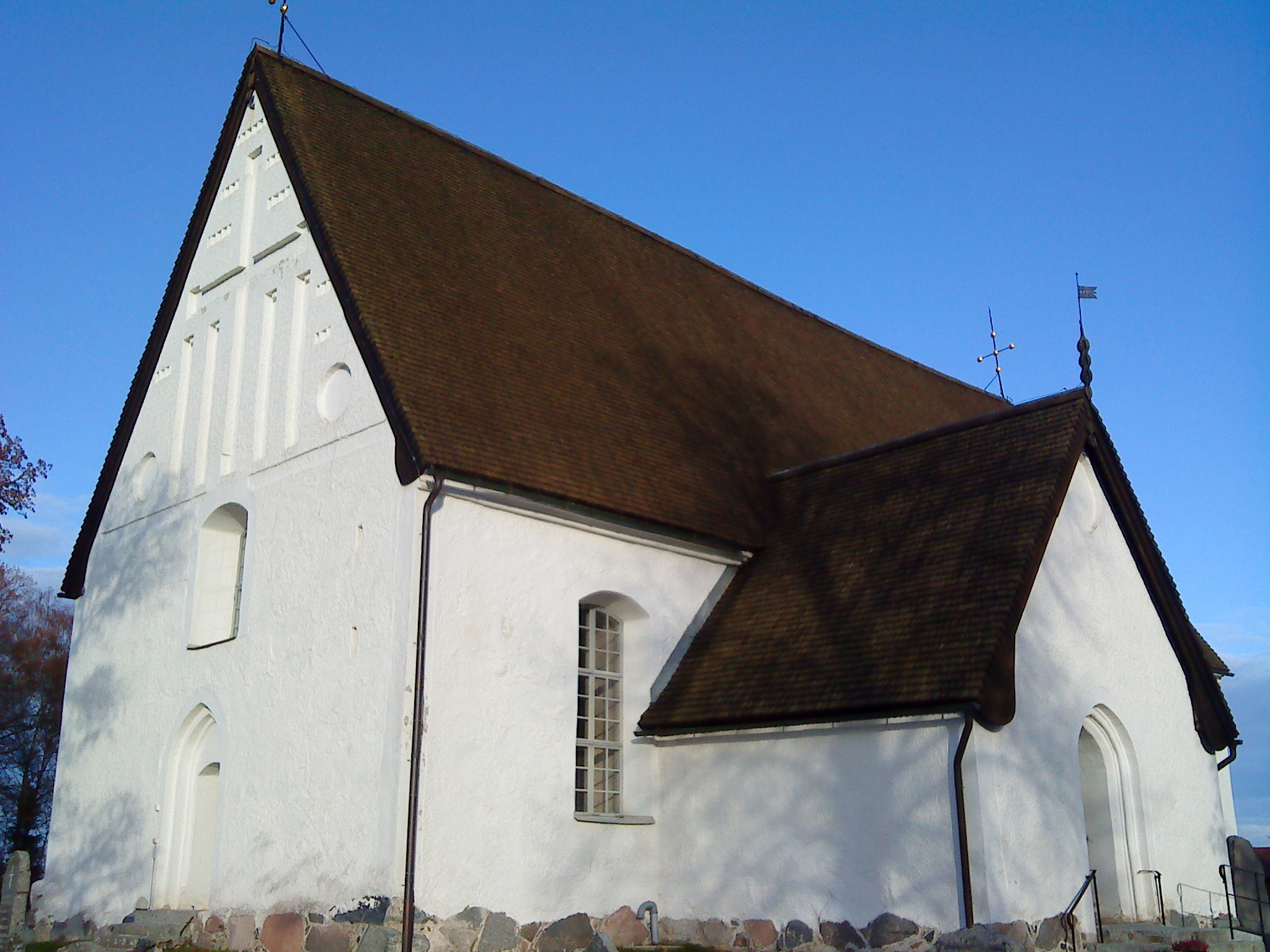
Viksta Church

Viksta Church (Swedish: Viksta kyrka) is a medieval church located north of Uppsala in Uppsala County, Sweden. It is part of the Archdiocese of Uppsala (Church of Sweden).

== History and architecture ==
Viksta Church was built circa 1280. An earlier, probably wooden roof and ceiling was replaced by the present roof supported by vaults sometime between 1430 and 1460. The frescos which decorate the vaults were painted in 1503. The church still largely retains its medieval appearance; the biggest change made after the Reformation was an enlargement of the windows carried out in 1761. The eastern (choir) wall still has the original medieval windows. On the same wall are some unusually well-made gable decorations made with brick. The external, wooden belfry was built in 1744-45 while the cemetery wall still contains two medieval lychgates.

The church contains a number of medieval art objects. The wooden triumphal cross is medieval, and so is a gilded copper processional cross (14th century). Another precious item is a chalice from the early 16th century. In the choir stands two wooden sculptures from the Middle Ages depicting female saints, one of which has been identified as Bridget of Sweden.
