= Ragnvald Knaphövde =

12th-century king of Sweden

Ragnvald Knaphövde was a King of Sweden whose reign is estimated to have occurred in the mid-1120s or c. 1130. His cognomen Knaphövde is explained as referring to a drinking vessel, the size of a man's head or meaning "round head" and referring to his being foolish. Ragnvald is mentioned in the regnal list of the Westrogothic law as the successor of King Inge the Younger.

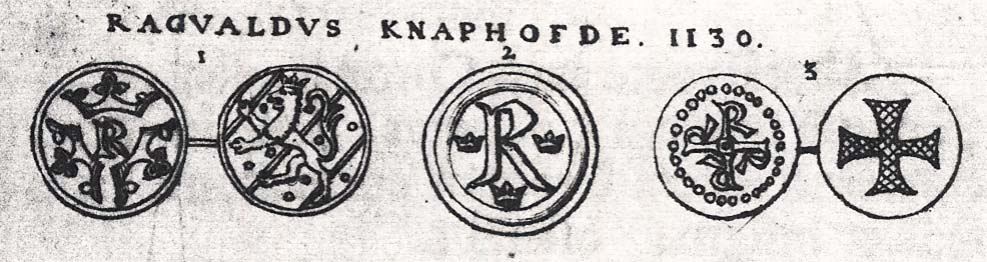
17th century numismatic pioneer Elias Brenner erroneously ascribed coins to Ragnvald, but the coins on the left have been shown to have been minted for King Magnus IV of Sweden; Brenner's methods are not considered reliable on early medieval Swedish coins.

His parentage is uncertain: King Inge the Elder of Sweden had a son named Ragnvald, and historian Sven Tunberg has suggested him as identical with Ragnvald Knaphövde. However, another tradition presents King Ragnvald as the son of an Olof Näskonung (Neskonungr meant "king of a ness" or "petty king", in Old Norse), and the regnal list of the Westrogothic law does not mention that Ragnvald had any connection with the old line of kings.

== Election and assassination ==
Ragnvald Knaphövde had been elected king by the Swedes in Uppland and then acknowledged by the East Gothlanders in Östergötland on his Eriksgata, but when he entered Västergötland, he did so without taking Geatish hostages. In Karleby near Falköping, he was murdered by the Geats who instead had elected the Danish prince Magnus Nielsen as the king.

The Danish chronicler Saxo Grammaticus explained later in the same century that the election of Magnus and the murder of a rightful king of Sweden was part of a Gothic (Geatish) plan to arrogate the right of electing the king from the Swedes:

[1] Interea Sueticarum partium rege absumpto, Gothi summam, cuius omne penes Sueones arbitrium erat, Magno deferre ausi, alieni privilegii detrimento dignitatis sibi incrementa quaerebant. [2] Quorum Sueones auctoritate contempta, veterem gentis suae praerogativam in aliquanto obscurioris populi invidia deponere passi non sunt. [3] Igitur antiquae dignitatis speciem intuentes, titulum iniusta collatione praereptum novi regis electu cassarunt. [4] Qui mox a Gothis trucidatus, morte Magno imperium cessit.

However, the king of Sweden was dead and in spite of the fact that it was the privilege of the Swedes to elect a new king, the Geats arrogated this dignity by putting aside the right of others and ventured to give the kingship to Magnus. The Swedes did not want to allow the Geats any kind of right in this respect and considered it improper that a lesser nation should claim a right that had belonged to the Swedes since time immemorial. As they claimed their old rights, they declared the election of Magnus invalid, because the Geats had no right to elect king, and elected a new one. This new king was soon killed by the Geats and at his death the dominions passed to Magnus.

In the following century, in the Westrogothic law, the Geats would acknowledge that it was the Swedes who were entitled to elect and depose the king. In the regnal list of this law, they ignored the existence of any Magnus, but instead they defended the murder of Ragnvald as follows:

Tiundi war Rangwaldær konongær. baldær oc huxstor. reð .a. karllæpitt at vgisllædhu. oc fore þa sæwirðnigh han giorðhe allum wæstgötom. þa fek han skiæmðær döðhæ. styrðhi þa goðhær laghmaðþær. wæstrægötllandi. oc lanz höffhengiær. oc waru þa allir tryggir landi sinu.

'The tenth (Christian king) was Ragnvald king, bold and proud. He rode to Karleby without hostage, and for the disrespect that he showed all the West Geats, he was given a death in shame. Then a good lawspeaker and chieftain ruled Västergötland. And everyone was safe in their country.'

Thus, the Geats explained the murder of Ragnvald as vengeance for his arrogant attitude towards them. After the death of King Magnus, the West Gothland region was ruled by jarls, probably under the nominal supremacy of Danish kings during a few decades until the Swedish king Sverker the Elder and after him the Swedish king Erik Jedvardsson were accepted there.

The 16th-century Swedish King John III would later have a damaged tombstone replaced for Ragnvald, over a grave at Vreta Abbey. This is considered the family grave of King Inge the Elder, named for that king's son mentioned above.

== Notes and references ==
Ragnvald Knaphövde Died: 1126
Regnal titles
Preceded by Inge the Younger	King of Sweden; 1125–1126	Vacant Title next held by Sverker I of Sweden
