= Bartolf Leslie =

Scottish and Hungarian nobleman

Bartolf

Governor of Edinburgh Castle
- Tenure: 11th Century (after 1067)
- Predecessor: New creation
- Successor: Thomas de Cancia
- Native name: Bartolf Lesley or Lessley
- Other titles: Head of the Leslie Family; Earl of Ross (not listed); Lord Lesley
- Born: Before c. 1067
- Died: c. 1121
- Noble family: Leslie/Lesselyn

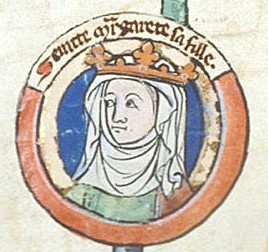
St. Margaret depicted in a 13th-century manuscript

Bartolf also known as Bartholomew was a Scottish and Hungarian nobleman and the founder of the Leslie family, who currently serve as Earls of Leven and Earls of Rothes and Lord Newark, all of which are situated in the historic kingdom of Scotland. He came over from Hungary in 1067 with Margaret later St Margaret of Scotland.

Bartolf is known for being the first governor of Edinburgh Castle in the 11th century, he moved to Scotland in 1067 and married king Malcolm III's sister Beatrix (with whom he founded the Leslie family). He may have lived until the 12th century according to the Scottish Rampant Clan website.

== Origin ==
A 16th-century descendant would claim that Bardolf was a nobleman of Hungarian origin who accompanied the Hungarian-born English prince, Edgar Ætheling, and his sister Margaret, later queen, to the kingdom of Scotland in 1067 following the Norman conquest of England. He was supposedly very brave and that is why he was given the title of Governor of Edinburgh Castle. It is said that his father went by the name of Walter de Lesthlin.

== Earl of Ross and Lord Lesley ==
He supposedly was given the title of Earl of Ross by king Malcolm Canmore and Lord Lesley which became Lord Leslie by 1445. This is according to a 19th-century book on titles within Scotland. His name in this book is the Latinised Bartholdus.

== "Grip fast" legend ==
Clan Leslie member badge bearing the motto Grip Fast which originates from Bartolf.

As the Queen's Chamberlain, it was Bartolf's duty to carry the Queen on his own horse, with her riding pillion on a pad behind the saddle with a belt round his waist for her to hold. Tradition has it that one day while riding in this fashion they were crossing a swollen stream when the horse stumbled and the Queen fearing she would fall off cried "Gin the buckle bide?" (Will the buckle hold?), Bartolf, urging his horse to the other side answered crying "Grip Fast!" and they reached the other side safely. This incident so alarmed Bartolf that he had two more buckles added to his belt, so three buckles on a belt became the Arms of the Leslies and "Grip Fast!" became the motto.

== Death ==
According to the book "Historical records of the family of Leslie from 1067 to 1868-9 Vol.1" by Colonel Leslie KH of Balquhain, he died in 1121 and passed the title of Earl of Ross and Lord Lessley to his son Malcolm. Malcolm was created constable of the royal castle at Inverurie which he held for David I, and his great-grandson, Sir Norman de Leslie, acquired the lands of Fythkill in Fife, afterwards called Leslie, around 1282.

Preceded by New creation	1st Governor of Edinburgh Castle; 11th Century (after 1067)	Succeeded by Thomas de Cancia (1107-?)
Preceded by Founder of the Family	Head of the Leslie House after 1067 - c. 1121	Succeeded by Malcolm Leslie
