= Alfanus II =

Archbishop of Salerno

Alfanus II or Alfano II (died 1121) was the Archbishop of Salerno from 1086/7 until his death, succeeding Alfanus I. Like his predecessor and his successor, Romuald I, he was a Lombard.

Before he was archbishop, Alfanus was a custos (custodian) of the church of Saint Maximus. He was appointed to the see of Salerno by Roger Borsa, Duke of Apulia, with whom he was generally on good terms. His appointment received the denunciation of Archbishop Hugh of Lyon, who wrote to Marchioness Matilda of Tuscany that "Alfanus is guilty of overbearing ambition" (de manifestissima ambitione Alfanus convictus fuerat). He opposed Roger's attempt to remove a cleric from the church of Santa Maria de Domno in 1092, receiving support from Pope Urban II.

On 21 September 1089, Urban II issued a bull confirming his predecessor's grant of privileges to the Abbey of Cava, placing it directly under papal authority and conceding it the right to elect its own abbots and build a baptismal church on its land. In 1098, Alfanus II complained that these privileges harmed the church of Salerno, and the next year Urban II rescinded them. Later, Pope Pascal II re-privileged the abbey, but left the right of consecrating the abbots and their altars to the archbishop. a merely ceremonial privilege. On 20 July 1098, Urban II issued a bull granting Alfanus II primacy over the archdioceses of Acerenza and Conza. Although this was mainly ceremonial, it allowed Alfanus to advise the papal legate presiding over the election of new archbishops in those sees and to escort them to Rome to receive their consecration. Between 1100 and 1106, Pascal II returned to Salerno its "ancient privileges" over the dioceses of Malvito and Nola.

== Bibliography ==
- Giovanni Vitolo. "La Badia di Cava e gli Arcivescovi di Salerno tra XI e XII secolo". Rassegna Storica Salernitana, 8 (1987), 9–16.
