= Mount Didgori =

Mountain in Georgia

- Location within Georgia Location within Kvemo Kartli

Highest point
- Elevation: 1,631 m (5,351 ft)
- Coordinates: 41°45′38″N 44°30′25″E

Geography
- Location: Georgia
- Parent range: Trialeti

Geology
- Rock age: Quaternary

Mount Didgori (Georgian: დიდგორი), 1647 m, is situated some 40 km west of Georgia’s capital Tbilisi in the eastern part of the Trialeti Range, which is part of the Lesser Caucasus. It was a site of the celebrated victory won by the Georgian king David IV over the Seljuk armies on August 12, 1121. The battlefield extends for several kilometers and is covered by abundant subalipine meadows. Early in the 1990s, an impressive monument was erected at the site of the battle, consisting of dozens of massive swords pushed into the ground and posing as crosses, and colossal sculptures of dismembered bodies of warriors scattered in the meadows, centred around a massive concrete column in the shape of a 'deda bodzi', the central column in medieval Georgian dwellings. The monument is located at 41º45'38 N, 44º30'29 E. The monument was designed by sculptor Merab Berdzenishvili and architect Tamaz Gabunia, who were awarded the State Prize of Georgia for their work in 1995.

Since 1997, a commemoration of the battle, "Didgoroba" has been held at the monument each August 12.

Didgori is also the name of a Georgian Armoured Personnel Carrier.
