= Lü Shinang =

Manichaean leader

- Traditional Chinese: 呂師囊
- Simplified Chinese: 吕师囊
Transcriptions
Standard Mandarin
- Hanyu Pinyin: Lǚ Shīnáng
- Wade–Giles: Lü Shih-nang

Lü Shinang (died 1121) was the leader of a Chinese Manichaean group who led an uprising against the Song dynasty in Taizhou, Zhejiang. He also appears as a minor character in Water Margin, one of the Four Great Classical Novels of Chinese literature. In the novel, he is a subordinate of Fang La, a rebel leader whom the 108 Stars of Destiny have to defeat after they received amnesty from Emperor Huizong.

== Life ==
Lü Shinang was from present-day Baita Town, Xianju County, Zhejiang. He was the leader of a local Manichaean group and helped the common people, who were suffering from poverty. Because of his efforts, he was nicknamed "Lord Xinling" after one of the Four Lords of the Warring States period.

In 1120, Xianju County was hit by a drought and the people suffered from famine. The following year, the situation worsened but the local government did not provide relief aid. Instead, it pressured the common people to pay taxes and supply grain. Lü Shinang and about 1,000 men from Xianju were ordered to deliver grain to the county office. On the way, the escorting officers treated the men harshly and beat them when they asked for a short break. Lü Shinang made a speech to his fellows, denouncing the government and calling them to revolt. The people responded to his call and killed the officers and distributed grain to the starving people. Later, Lü Shinang's rebel force defeated an army sent to suppress the rebellion and seized control of Xianju. At the same time, many people and Lü Shinang's followers in Yongkang and Yongjia joined him in rebellion. The size of the rebel army increased until it reached more than 10,000 men. Lü Shinang's rebellion took place in the territories of Fang La, another rebel leader who established a separatist regime in southern China against the Song dynasty. Lü Shinang allied himself with Fang La.

Between March and May 1121, the rebels attacked Taizhou thrice but failed to conquer the city. Lü Shinang split his army into two forces to take Tiantai and Huangyan. Towards the end of May, Song government forces had defeated and captured Fang La. Lü Shinang's force defeated the Song army led by Zhe Kecun and Liu Guang and captured Yueqing and Wenzhou.

Between May and June 1121, the Song general Tong Guan organised an army of 150,000 to crush the rebellion and inflicted heavy casualties on Lü Shinang's forces. In August or September, Lü Shinang attacked Wenzhou and besieged the city for 36 days but failed to conquer it. The situation worsened when reinforcements for the Song forces arrived. The rebels were surrounded in Huangyan and suffered heavy casualties. Lü Shinang was wounded and attempted to escape by leaping off a cliff, but was captured by Song forces. Lü Shinang was eventually killed by arrows and his corpse was dismembered.

After suppressing the revolt, Tong Guan ordered a massacre on Lü Shinang's clan and followers. Lü Shinang's hometown was destroyed and its inhabitants slaughtered. Several years later, some survivors returned to the town and rebuilt their homes near the bridge overlooking Weijiang Stream. The place was named Lü's Bridge in memory of Lü Shinang.

== In Water Margin ==
In the novel Water Margin, Lü Shinang is a rich man from Shezhou who donated his wealth to support Fang La in his rebellion against the Song Empire. He serves as an official under Fang La after the latter declared himself an emperor and established a separatist regime in southern China. He is well versed in military strategy and combat skills, and wields a Snake Spear in battle.

Lü Shinang participates in the war between Fang La's forces and the Liangshan forces loyal to the Song Empire. He has 50,000 troops and 12 subordinates who are collectively known as the "12 Deities of Jiangnan" under his command. He encounters the Liangshan army led by Song Jiang near Wuxi, and engages Xu Ning in a one-on-one duel. After fighting for more than 20 rounds, Lü Shinang grows weary and accidentally reveals a weak spot. Xu Ning detects it and seizes the opportunity to spear Lü Shinang below the ribs and kill him.
