= Ascelina =

French Roman Catholic saint

Saint Ascelina
- Born: 1121
- Died: 1195
- Venerated in: Roman Catholic Church
- Feast: 23 August

Ascelina (1121–1195), was a French Cistercian nun and mystic.

Ascelina spent the majority of her life at the Cistercian convent at Boulancourt, Haute-Marne, France. It is believed that she was a relative of St. Bernard.
