= Zbigniew (duke of Poland) =

Duke of Poland
- Reign: 1102 — 1107
- Predecessor: Władysław Herman
- Successor: Bolesław Wrymouth
- Spouse: Unknown wife (allegedly) (Note: According to Kronika wielkopolska)
- Issue: At least 2 (allegedly)
- House: Piast
- Father: Władysław Herman
- Mother: Unknown Polish noblewoman

Zbigniew (also known as Zbygniew; c. 1073 – 8 July 1113?), was a duke of Poland (in Greater Poland, Kuyavia and Masovia) during 1102–1107. He was the first-born son of Władysław I Herman by his first wife, whose identity is unknown.

Zbigniew's legitimacy was questioned, presumably due to his parents's marriage being conducted according to pre-Christian tradition, and after the birth of his half-brother Bolesław Wrymouth, he was set on an ecclesiastical career. At the end of the 11th century, when real power in the country was held by the Palatine Sieciech, the opposition of some Silesian magnates caused the return of Zbigniew to Poland and forced Władysław I to recognize him as his successor. The intrigues of Sieciech and Władysław I's second wife Judith Maria caused Zbigniew and his younger half-brother to become allies, and both, in the end, forced their father to divide the country between them and to exile the Palatine.

After the death of his father, Zbigniew obtained the northern part of the country as an equal ruler with Bolesław. However, conflicts between them arose because Zbigniew, as the elder, considered himself the sole rightful heir of the kingdom. He began to search for allies against Bolesław. During 1102–1106, a fratricidal war for supremacy ensued, in which Zbigniew suffered complete defeat and was forced to go into exile in Germany. Under the pretext of restoring him, Emperor Henry V invaded Poland in 1109, but was defeated at Głogów.

In subsequent years, Boleslaw failed to defeat Bohemia, and in 1111 had to make peace with it and with his overlord, the Emperor. One of the conditions of Henry V was the return of Zbigniew to Poland, where he received a minor domain. Shortly after his return Zbigniew was blinded and then died.

== Early years ==
=== Childhood ===
Zbigniew was the child of Władysław and a Polish woman, who is believed by historians to have been below her husband's social rank. According to 15th century The Chronicle of Greater Poland ["Kronika wielkopolska"], she was member of the Prawdzic family, however it is unknown whether Prawdzic clan had even existed at this point of time. This union took place ca. 1070 under Slavic rites without a church ceremony. Some scholars argue that the marriage, although made under pagan rites, was lawful. They claim that not until the end of the 12th century did the Papal legate Peter of Capua, who stayed in Poland during 1197, order that only marriages performed under Church rites (Latin: matrimonium in facie ecclesie contrahere) would be considered as legitimate, following the writings of the Rocznik krakowsk.

The exact birth date of Władysław I Herman's first born son is unknown. According to Oswald Balzer, Zbigniew was born in the first half of the 1070s, and Gerard Labuda agrees on a birth date in the early 1070s, while Roman Grodecki argues for Zbigniew's birth taking place around 1073, and Kazimierz Jasiński for a birth date between 1070 and 1073.

Zbigniew's legitimacy was questioned by some members of the Catholic Church, who claimed he was the son of Władysław I's concubine. However, having been born from the union seen as legitimate according to older customs, he was considered heir apparent by the Polish nobles; he was ultimately recognized as the rightful heir by Maur, the bishop of Kraków.

In 1079, after his older brother Bolesław II the Generous was deposed, Władysław I became the ruler of Poland. By this time, he had probably already had Masovia as his own separate district. According to historians, the new ruler was quickly noted as incompetent, and the population began to miss the achievements of the exiled Prince. In 1080, Władysław I married Princess Judith, daughter of Duke Vratislaus II of Bohemia; Zbigniew's mother either had died by this point, or Władysład had their marriage dissolved.

Around 1086, Władysław I's rule in Poland was threatened by the coronation of his father-in-law, Vratislaus II, as King of Bohemia and Poland, who at the same time concluded an alliance with King Ladislaus I of Hungary.

Władysław I's legitimacy was questioned by the supporters of the exiled Bolesław II and his only son and rightful heir, Mieszko Bolesławowic. Afraid of losing his position, in 1086 Władysław I recalled his nephew (and his mother) from their Hungarian exile. Mieszko received the district of Kraków and later married (1088) a Rurikid princess. These moves led the opposition to stop questioning the legality of Władysław I's rule. The situation was further complicated by the prince because he didn't have a legitimate son. Zbigniew, his first-born son, couldn't be considered as heir, because he was a product of a union not recognized by the Church.

=== Loss of primogeniture ===
In 1086, Judith of Bohemia finally gave birth to a son, the future Bolesław III Wrymouth, and with this, Zbigniew's situation changed dramatically. In that year, he was placed in the Canonry of Kraków, despite being too young to be ordained a priest. This position was likely arranged by Judith of Bohemia to keep Zbigniew away from the line of succession. Dowager Duchess Maria Dobroniega, Zbigniew's paternal grandmother, guided his ecclesiastical studies. It's known that the first teacher of Zbigniew was Otto, who later became Bishop of Bamberg. In addition to the religious teachings, he taught him dialectic, grammar and the works of Isidore of Seville. Due to his young age, Zbigniew hadn't received the customary priestly journey.

A few months after the birth of her son, Judith of Bohemia died. In 1089, Władysław I married again. The chosen bride was Judith Maria, sister of Henry IV, Holy Roman Emperor and widow of the ex-King Solomon of Hungary; she was renamed Sophia, perhaps to distinguish herself from Władysław I's first wife. Zbigniew's relationship with her was a cold one.

The position of Bolesław as legitimate heir was still threatened by Mieszko Bolesławowic, who was popular with the Polish aristocracy. This probably contributed to his death in 1089, allegedly poisoned by order of Sieciech and Judith Maria. In that year, Zbigniew was sent to Saxony, thanks to the intrigues of his new stepmother. Once there he was placed in Quedlinburg Abbey, where Judith Maria's sister Adelaide was Abbess. Probably while there he was finally ordained a priest. As taking holy orders would render Zbigniew ineligible for the succession, Władysław I hoped to eliminate the two main pretenders to the throne, secure the inheritance of his legitimate son Bolesław and weaken the growing opposition against him.

=== Rule of Sieciech ===
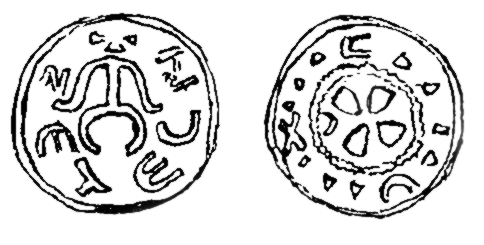
Denarius with "cavalry" cross of Sieciech.

During the stay of Zbigniew in Quedlinburg, his father, Władysław I, became dependent on his supporter, Count Palatine Sieciech, to whom Władysław probably owed his throne. Sieciech was also the first guardian of Bolesław, still a minor. In his intrigues to take over control of the country, the Palatine was supported by the Prince's wife Judith Maria.

In 1090, Sieciech, with his militia, took control of Gdańsk Pomerania. Władysław I prevented further actions through the fortification of major towns and the burning of others. Several months later, a rebellion of the elite of Gdańsk restored their independence. In the autumn of 1091, Polish and Bohemian militia made a further but unsuccessful invasion of Pomerania, which culminated in a battle at the Wda river.

During this time, Polish policy was focused on Kievan Rus'. The Rurikid princes of the Rostislavich line, then in power in Russia, didn't recognise Polish sovereignty, and invaded Poland repeatedly, especially Prince Vasilko of Terebovlia, allied with the Kipchaks. Sieciech was installed as the effective ruler of Poland. He demonstrated this by minting his own coin and consolidated his position by appointing his supporters to the judiciary. The main motivation of Sieciech was his lust for power and wealth, and adopted violent methods to achieve them. The repressive actions of Sieciech (selling into slavery, removal from offices, sentences of exile) caused a massive political emigration from Polish territories to Bohemia.

== Legitimisation and division of the Polish state ==
=== Act of legitimisation ===
The consequence of Sieciech's actions was a growing opposition against his rule. In 1093, a group of powerful Silesian lords kidnapped Zbigniew and returned him to Poland. Initially, Zbigniew was protected by Magnus, the Castellan of Wrocław. Władysław I took this as a clear revolt against him. The knighthood, who supported Zbigniew, broke off all negotiations with Sieciech and Władysław I when news reached them about the disloyal behaviour of some Hungarian knights, who abducted both Sieciech and Bolesław. This forced Władysław I to issue an act of legitimization which recognized Zbigniew as his son, member of the Piast dynasty and rightful successor.

By 1096, Sieciech and Bolesław had escaped from Hungary and launched an expedition against Silesia and Kujawy to overturn the act of legitimization. Zbigniew steadfastly defied the advance of Władysław I and Sieciech's troops. However, despite the help of Pomeranian troops, Zbigniew was defeated at the Battle of Goplo. He was captured and imprisoned until the intervention of the Church secured his release on 1 May 1097 at the consecration of the rebuilt Gniezno Cathedral. At the same time, the act of legitimization was reinstated.

After the intrigues of Sieciech and Judith Maria to take power had been discovered, Zbigniew and Bolesław became allies. In 1098, both princes forced Władysław I to give them separate provinces. Władysław I conceded and made a formal division of his lands.

Zbigniew received Greater Poland (including Gniezno), Kuyavia, Łęczyca and Sieradz Land. Bolesław received Lesser Poland, Silesia, Lubusz Land and probably Sandomierz and Lublin on the Bug River (near Brześć nad Bugiem). Władysław I kept Masovia and its capital, Płock as well as major cities including Wrocław, Kraków and Sandomierz.

=== Exile of Sieciech ===
The division of Poland and the admission of Władysław I's sons as co-rulers worried Sieciech. He feared that this could weaken his position. According to historiography, it remains unclear why Władysław I supported Sieciech rather than his sons. Zbigniew and Bolesław renewed their alliance and prepared for war. This renewal was formalised by the magnate Skarbimir at the Wiec in Wrocław. It was then decided that nobleman Wojsław Powała (a relative of Sieciech) be removed as Bolesław's guardian and that an expedition against the Palatine be organized. In 1099, the opposing forces met in a battle at the river Pilica near Zarnowiec. Zbigniew and Bolesław prevailed. The defeated Władysław I agreed to permanently remove Sieciech from his position.

A few months later, Zbigniew and Bolesław attacked Sieciechów, where the Palatine was hidden. Surprisingly, Władysław I, with a little army, came to aid Sieciech. In this situation, the princes decided to depose their father. In a campaign to encircle Sieciech and Władysław I, Zbigniew marched against Masovia, where he took control of Płock, while Bołeslaw was directed to the South, where he could conquer Lesser Poland. However, Władysław I predicted the maneuvers of his sons and directed his forces to Masovia. The definitive battle between both armies took place near Płock. Władysław I was defeated and forced to exile Sieciech from the country. Martin I, Archbishop of Gniezno. also took a major part in the disagreements between Władysław I and his sons. The Palatine left Poland around 1100–1101 and went to Germany. He returned to Poland a few years later, but didn't play any political role. He may have been blinded. Władysław I died on 4 June 1102.

== Reign ==
=== Struggle for supremacy (1102–1106) ===
The division of the country between Zbigniew and Bolesław III gave both princes full control over their respective districts. From the lands of Władysław I, Zbigniew received Masovia (with Płock) and Bolesław III received Sandomierz. However, disputes began between both rulers over seniority. Zbigniew considered himself the senior ruler and believed this reflected the general view.

The provinces of Zbigniew and Bolesław III operated as separate states with their own internal and foreign policies, leading to discord between the two rulers. In their districts, the brothers allied with the local nobility. Each of them sought foreign allies. Pomerania became a contentious issue between them, because Bolesław III made military incursions in order to expand there. Zbigniew, on the other hand, wanted to maintain good economic and political relations with Pomerania. In one of Bolesław's first organized expeditions to Pomerania, Zbigniew managed to persuade the knighthood not to participate, which enraged the junior ruler. However, this situation didn't last, because in the next few months the knights were again in favor of Bolesław's expeditions and accompanied him several times to the West (including Prussia). In autumn of 1102 Wrymouth organized an expedition, during which his Drużyna (army) captured Białogard.

The Pomeranians retaliated by attacking Zbigniew, who at that point allied with Bohemia in order to pressure Bolesław III to make peace. Instead, the junior prince made alliances with Hungary and Kievan Rus', the latter sealed by his marriage to Zbyslava, daughter of Grand Prince Sviatopolk II of Kiev in 1103. Zbigniew declined to attend the wedding, seeing in this union a direct threat against him. Zbigniew bribed Borivoj II of Bohemia to invade Bolesław III's lands. Bolesław III reacted by ravaging and looting the Pomeranian border regions and Moravia; after this, in exchange for a huge payment, Borivoj II ended his alliance with Zbigniew. The incursions in 1103 — unsuccessful battle for Kołobrzeg — and during 1104–1105 effectively destroyed Zbigniew's peaceful relationship with Pomerania.

In 1105, Zbigniew and Bolesław III agreed to compromise in matters of foreign policy. However, with respect to Pomerania, the agreement (called the Tyniec Accord) failed. The following year, Zbigniew refused to help his brother in his fight against the Pomeranians. In retaliation, and with the help of his Kievan and Hungarian allies, Bolesław III attacked Zbigniew’s lands, triggering a civil war over the overlordship. The combined army took Kalisz, Gniezno, Spycimierz and Leczyca without difficulty. Bolesław III also captured Archbishop Martin I of Gniezno, Zbigniew's primary ally. In Łęczyca, through the mediation of the Bishop of Kraków, Baldwin, Zbigniew capitulated. Bolesław III became the 'High Duke of all Poland', and gained from Zbigniew the regions of Greater Poland, Kuyavia, Łęczyca and Sieradz Land. Zbigniew retained Masovia as a fiefdom.

=== End of reign ===
In 1107, Zbigniew organized a rebellion after refusing to burn the fortress of Kurów in Puławy. Bolesław III used this rebellion and the prior failure to provide him with military support in his campaign against Pomerania as excuses to attack Zbigniew.

In the winter of 1107–1108, Bolesław III and his Kievan-Hungarian allies attacked Masovia. Zbigniew was forced to surrender and was exiled from the country. Since then, Bolesław III became the sole ruler over all Poland. The actual transfer of power took place the year before (1107) when Zbigniew was still in Masovia, when he paid complete homage to his brother for his land. Initially, Zbigniew took refuge in Prague, where he gained the support of the local ruler, Svatopluk.

== Last years ==
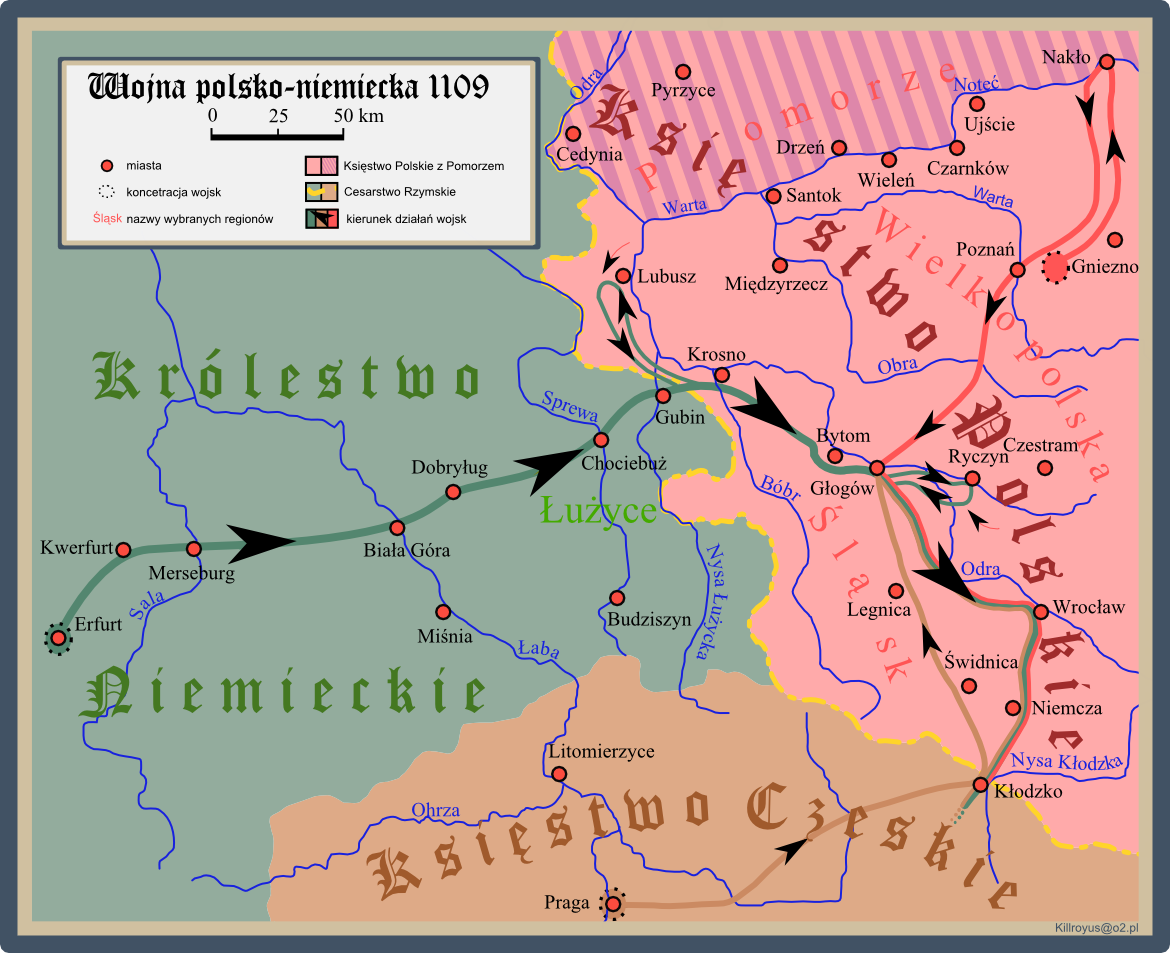
Polish-German War of 1109.

=== Claims against Bolesław III ===
The immediate cause of the Polish-German War of 1109 was Bolesław's attack on Bohemia in 1108, which thwarted a planned German-Bohemian expedition against Hungary. This resulted in a joint expedition against Bolesław by Emperor Henry V and his Bohemian allies. However, the Emperor used the claims of the exiled Zbigniew as a secondary pretext. Henry made an ultimatum to Bolesław III: surrender half of Poland to Zbigniew, formally recognize the Holy Roman Empire as overlord, and pay a regular tribute of 300 pieces of fine silver or provide 300 knights on military expeditions.

Hostilities began in Silesia. Bolesław III conducted a highly effective guerrilla war against the Holy Roman Emperor and his allies, and eventually he defeated them at the Battle of Hundsfeld on 24 August 1109, although the existence of this battle is doubted by historians because it was first recorded about a century later. The sources don't reveal whether Zbigniew took direct part in the expedition.

=== Blinding and death ===
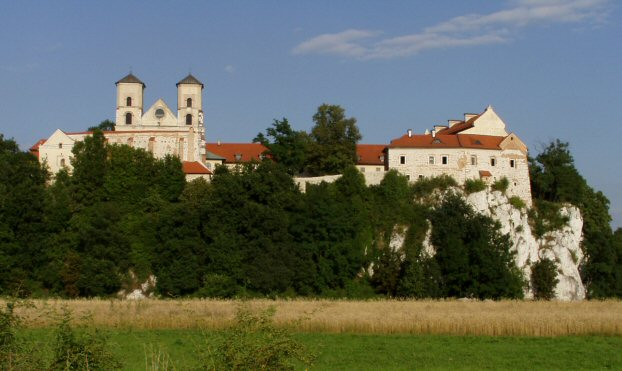
Tyniec Abbey.

In 1110, Bolesław III campaigned unsuccessfully against Bohemia. His intention was to install yet another pretender on the Czech throne, Soběslav I, who sought refuge in Poland. He won a decisive victory against the Czechs at the Battle of Trutina on 8 October 1110; however, following the battle, he broke off the campaign. The reason for this is speculated to be the unpopularity of Soběslav I among Czechs as well as Bolesław III’s unwillingness to further damage his relations with the Holy Roman Empire.

In 1111 Duke Vladislav I of Bohemia and Bolesław III negotiated a truce, under which both Soběslav I and Zbigniew would be returned their homelands. Once in Poland, Zbigniew received a grant of land, probably Sieradz.

Bolesław III probably agreed to the return of his half-brother as a result of pressure from the many supporters of the exiled prince in 1108, who, according to the reports of Gallus Anonymus, was surrounded by bad advisers (likely including Martin I, Archbishop of Gniezno). Once in Poland, Zbigniew claimed sovereignty over his previous domains at the instigation of this group. The first step towards this was his presence in the Advent ceremonial (forbidden to him after he recognized Bolesław as his overlord in Łęczyca in 1107), which is reserved for rulers. Zbigniew arrived surrounded by attendants, a sword carried before him. This was likely perceived by Boleslaw III as an act of treason and caused a definitive breach in their relationship. These factors likely influenced Bolesław III's decision to have Zbigniew blinded, in 1112.

Bolesław III was excommunicated by Archbishop Martin I, whom remained as strong a supporter of Zbigniew as ever. The crime committed against Zbigniew launched a political crisis in the Piast monarchy, and caused public outrage. The sources don't provide information on whether Bolesław III was indeed excluded from the community of the Church.

Bolesław III then probably decided to make a public penance as a result of the negative public response to Zbigniew's blinding. His aim was to rebuild his weakened authority and gain the favor of the supporters of his brother. According to Gallus Anonymous, Bolesław III, after his repentance, asked and received Zbigniew's forgiveness.

Little is known of the death of Zbigniew. K. Jasiński, in the pages of his publication Rodowód pierwszych Piastów, advocated an immediate death after the blinding, like S. Kętrzyński, but didn't exclude the opposite view. J. Bieniak assumed, however, that Zbigniew's death came after 1114. An interesting reference contained in an obituary from the Benedictine monastery in Lubin recorded the death on 8 July 1113 of a monk from Tyniec Abbey called "Brother Zbigniew". This obituary helped historians form a hypothesis that this was Bolesław III's brother. The place of burial is recorded as the Benedictine monastery of Tyniec.

The Chronicle of the Greater Poland alleges that Zbigniew married and had children, however most historians treat this claim with skepticism.

== See also ==
- History of Poland (966–1385)

== Bibliography ==
- Gieysztor, Aleksander (1979). History of Poland. Warsaw: Polish Scientific Publishers PWN. ISBN 83-01-00392-8.
- "Zbigniew". Internetowa encyklopedia PWN (in Polish). Wydawnictwo Naukowe PWN. Archived from the original on 7 June 2011.
- "Zbigniew". WIEM Encyklopedia (in Polish). Archived from the original on 29 March 2013.

Zbigniew (duke of Poland) Piast Dynasty Born: ca. 1073 Died: 8 June? 1113?
Preceded by Władysław I Herman	Duke of Poland with Bolesław III; 1102 — 1107	Succeeded by Bolesław III Wrymouth
