= Bolesław III Wrymouth Monument, Płock =

Bolesław III the Wrymouthed Monument in Płock
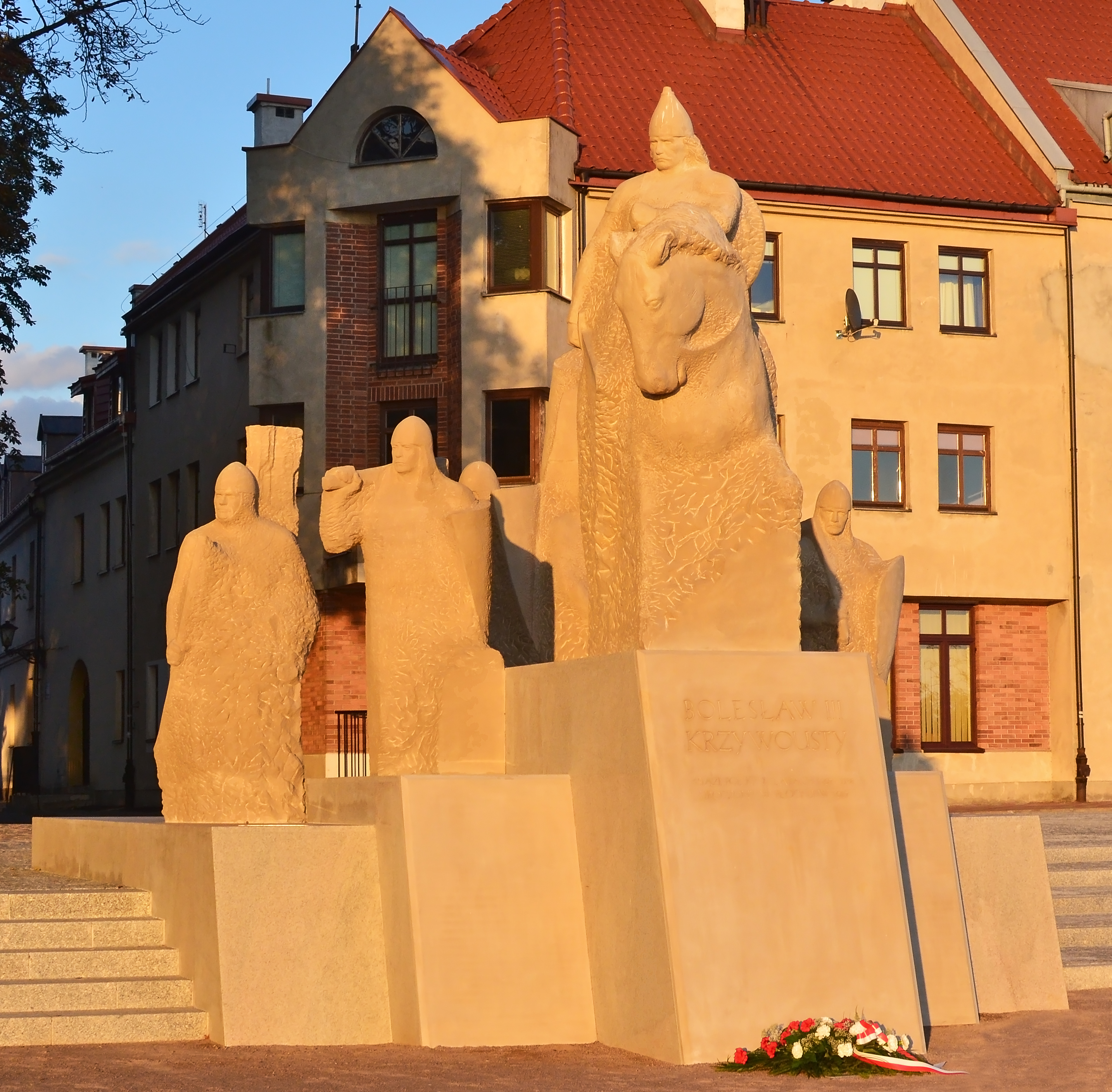
- Interactive map of Bolesław III the Wrymouthed Monument in Płock
- Location: Płock, Poland
- Coordinates: 52°32′40″N 19°41′00″E
- Designer: Zbigniew Mikielewicz
- Type: Statue
- Material: Light sandstone
- Height: 5 meters (16 feet)
- Opening date: 28 september 2012

Bolesław III the Wrymouthed Monument in Płock (Polish: Pomnik Bolesława III Krzywoustego w Płocku) shows prince Bolesław III Wrymouth (ruler of Poland in the years 1107–1138, born on August 20, 1086, in Płock) on horseback, surrounded by a group of warriors walking with banners.

The monument is made of light sandstone. Is over 5 meters tall and weighs about 21 tons. Construction of the monument was initiated by Marian Wilk by decision of the (then)president of Płock, Miroslaw Milewski. The sculptor was Zbigniew Mikielewicz. On July 31, 2012, the monument was placed on Prince's Square (Polish: Plac Książęcy) near Piekarska Street and St. Bartholomew's parish church. The original location of the monument, Gabriel Narutowicz Square, was changed in 2011 by the decision of Płock City Council.

In the Royal Chapel on the north side of Płock Cathedral is a marble sarcophagus forming a tomb with the remains of the two Polish rulers: Bolesław III the Wrymouthed (1086 –1138) and his father Władysław I Herman (c. 1043 –1102), also prince and ruler of Poland during the years 1079 –1102.

During the reign of these rulers, 1079 –1138, Płock was the capital of Poland.

== History ==
Bolesław III the Wrymouthed's Monument in Płock was officially unveiled on September 28, 2012.

== Bibliography ==
- "Bolesław Wrymouth returned to Płock" (in Polish). Gazeta.pl • Płock. 31 July 2012.
