= Bogumił (archbishop of Gniezno) =

His Excellency Bogumił
- Archbishop of Gniezno
- Church: Roman Catholic
- Archdiocese: Gniezno
- Installed: c. 1075
- Term ended: 1092
- Predecessor: Bossuta Stefan
- Successor: Heinrich von Wülzburg

Personal details
- Born: unknown
- Died: 1092

Bogumił (died 1092) was an early archbishop of Gniezno in Poland.

Although the eleventh century was a formative time for the Polish state, the historical records of the time are sparse and there is much that is not known about Bogumił.

He was ordained bishop in about 1075. On Christmas Day 1075, Bogumil presided over the coronation of Bolesław II the Bold in Gniezno Cathedral which was substantively rebuilt at this time.

Sometimes it is reported that in the dispute between King Bolesław the Szczodry and the Bishop of Kraków, Stanislaw, he took the king's side and took part in passing the death sentence on Stanislaw.

Bogumił died in 1092, and according to the 14th century Life of Otto of Bamberg, was succeeded as bishop by Heinrich von Wülzburg, though exact date are not given. Jan Długosz, writing in 15th century and Gesta principum Polonorum, however, indicate (but do not state) that his successor was Marcin. There is some question about whether Heinrich was actually bishop.

Religious titles
Preceded by Bossuta Stefan	Archbishop of Gniezno; 1075; c.1092	Succeeded by Heinrich von Wülzburg

== See also ==
- Bogumilus
