= Heinrich von Wülzburg =

German Benedictine monk, abbot and archbishop

His Excellency Heinrich von Wülzburg
- Archbishop of Gniezno
- Church: Roman Catholic
- Archdiocese: Gniezno
- Installed: unknown
- Predecessor: Bogumił
- Successor: Martin I

Personal details
- Born: unknown

Heinrich von Wülzburg was a German Benedictine monk, abbot of the monastery of Wülzburg and Archbishop of Gniezno in Poland.

According to the fourteenth-century life of Otto of Bamberg Heinrich arrived in Poland among the entourage of Otto of Bamberg. However, Jan Długosz, writing in 15th century and Gesta principum Polonorum do not reference him and there is some question about whether Heinrich was actually bishop.

Modern scholarship has been divided on his historicity, as he is mentioned in a single 12th-century source (Ebo of Michelsberg, Vita Ottonis episcopi Bambergensi) and not in any other contemporary sources, including documents related to the Gniezno archbishopric.

None of the old catalogs of the archbishops of Gniezno mentions him, nor does Jan Dlugosz know about him.

Among the historians who accept his historicity there is no agreement on his dates of birth, death, origin (Wülzburg is only one of the possible renderings of his origin; others include for example Weltenberg) and the period of his service as the archbishop. Wladyslaw Abraham held that Heinrick became archbishop in 1092 following the death of Bogumiła and before Marcin. Tadeusz Wojciechowski claimed that Heinrich came from the Abbey of Weltenberg and that he was actually archbishop between Martin and Jacob of Żnin. This position being supported by Karol Maleczyński.

Religious titles
Preceded by Bogumił	Archbishop of Gniezno unknown	Succeeded by Martin
