= Wife of Boleslaus the Generous =

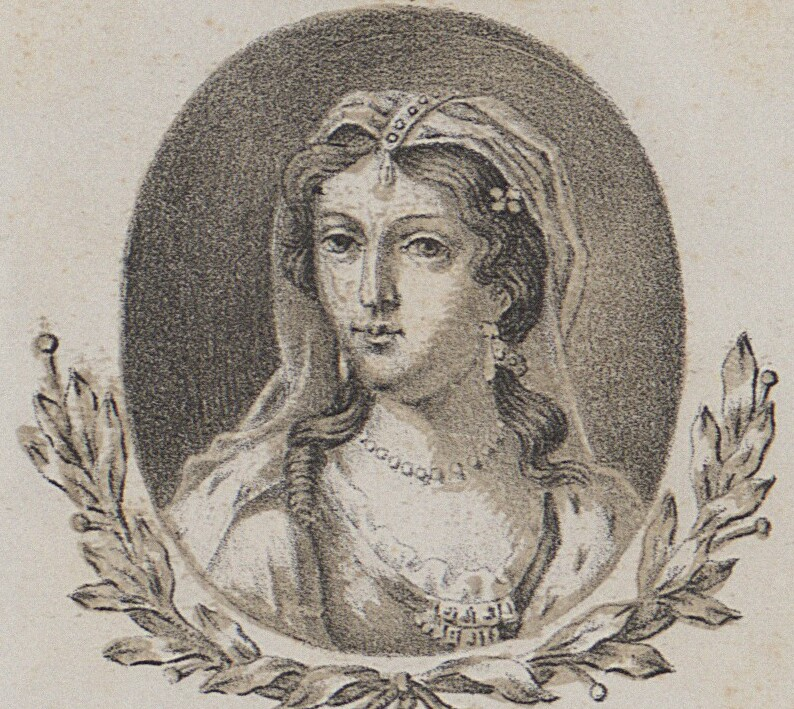

Duchess consort of Poland
- Tenure: 1068?–1076

Queen consort of Poland
- Tenure: 1076-1079
- Born: c.1047
- Died: after 1089
- Spouse: Bolesław II the Bold
- Issue: Mieszko Bolesławowic
- House: Piast (by marriage)

An unknown woman, alleged by Jan Długosz to have been named Wyszeslawa Sviatoslavna of Kiev (Ukrainian: Вишеслава Святославівна, Russian: Вышеслава Святославна, romanized: Vysheslava Svyatoslavna, Polish: Wyszesława Światosławówna) (c. 1047 – after 1089), was Duchess and later Queen of Poland as the wife of Bolesław II the Bold (Bolesław the Generous) and mother to his son, Prince Mieszko.

== Life ==
The contemporary records are scant on her identity; only 15th century chronicler Jan Długosz makes claim she was the daughter of the Prince of Kiev. Modern historians, led by Oswald Balzer in his Genealogia Piastów (1895), refuted the name and origins of Bolesław II's wife. They stated that she likely had a German or Russian origin. Also, there is the theory that the Queen Agnes (Agnes Regina) whose obituary is recorded in Zwiefalten was the wife of Bolesław II; it is also believed that she belonged to the Přemyslid dynasty.

She was certainly married to Bolesław II the Bold, Duke of Poland before 1069, because in that year their only child, Mieszko, was born. It is unknown if she was crowned with her husband; Jerzy Besala believes she was not, as there is no mention of this in the sources.

In 1079, together with her husband and son she was exiled in Hungary. Two years later (c. 1081/82) Bolesław II died under mysterious circumstances, probably by poison. In 1086, together with her son Mieszko, Wyszesława returned to Poland. According to Gallus Anonymus, she participated in the funeral of her son, who was poisoned in 1089. This is the last mention of the wife of Bolesław II the Bold; her further fate remains unknown.

Wife of Boleslaus the Generous Sviatoslavichi Born: ca. 1047? Died: aft. 1089
Royal titles
Preceded by Maria Dobroniega of Kiev (as Duchess)	Duchess consort of Poland; Queen consort of Poland; 1068?–1076 (Duchess); 1076–1079 (Queen)	Succeeded by Judith of Bohemia (as Duchess)
