= Church of the Visitation of the Blessed Virgin Mary, Kraków =

Roman Catholic church in Kraków, Poland

Church of the Visitation of the Blessed Virgin Mary
- Kościół Nawiedzenia Najświętszej Marii Panny
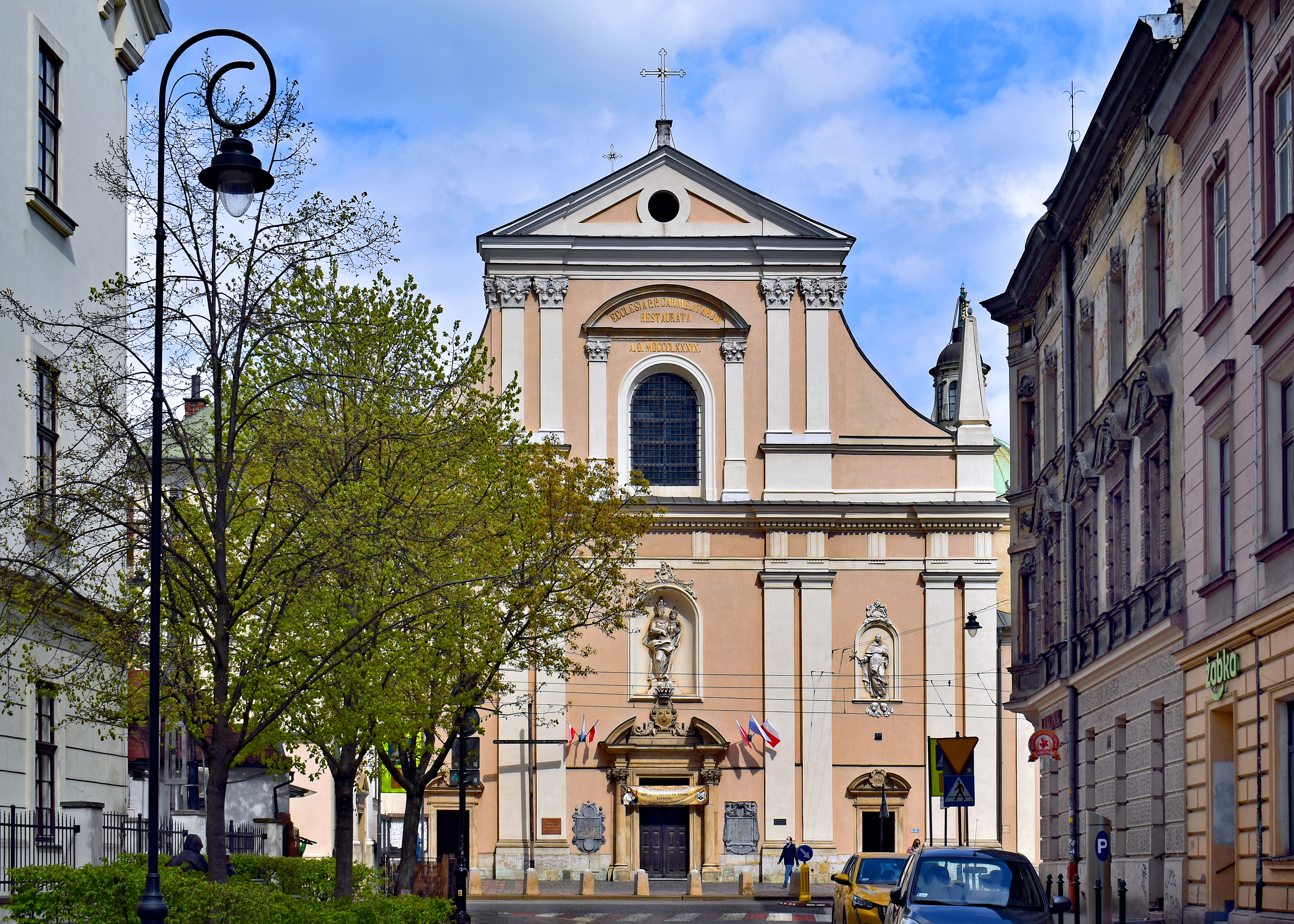
- Façade view from Rajska Street (from the west)
- Church of the Visitation of the Blessed Virgin Mary
- 50°03′54.5″N 19°55′54.5″E
- Location: Kraków
- Address: 19 Karmelicka Street
- Country: Poland
- Denomination: Roman Catholic
- Website: https://krakow.karmelici.pl

Historic Monument of Poland
- Designated: 1994-09-08
- Part of: Kraków historical city complex
- Reference no.: M.P. 1994 nr 50 poz. 418

Church of the Visitation of the Blessed Virgin Mary (Polish: Kościół Nawiedzenia Najświętszej Marii Panny) known colloquially as the Carmelites Church (Polish: Kościół karmelitów) and Church in Piasek (Polish: Kościół na Piasku) is a historic Roman Catholic parish and conventual church of the Carmelites located at 19 Karmelicka Street, in the former Piasek district of Kraków, Poland.

It is the city's first Carmelite church, hence the name of the street on which it stands.

== History ==
According to legend, the earliest church on the same site was founded in the 11th century by Duke Władysław I Herman after a vision led him to this spot northwest of the city walls, where he found blooming violets in sand which cured him of a disfiguring case of scurvy. The sand gave the church its alternative name, the Carmelite Church in Piasek. However, the first attested church building was begun in 1395 on the initiative of Jadwiga of Poland and Władysław Jagiełło. On the outside wall of the church along Garbarska Street there's a stone with a footprint carved into it, allegedly set by the Queen herself. The church was handed over in 1397 to the Carmelite Order recently invited by the Polish monarchs from Prague. The Gothic church was largely destroyed during the Swedish Deluge and was rebuilt in a Baroque style in the second half of the 17th century and consecrated in 1679. On August 15, 1683, Jan III Sobieski said his final prayers in Kraków at this church before setting out for his victorious Battle of Vienna against the Ottoman Empire. When the Confederacy of Bar seized control of the Old Town of Kraków in 1772, Russian troops used the church (just outside the Old Town walls) as an artillery sighting platform, leading to considerable damage. In 1997, Pope John Paul II raised the church to the status of a minor basilica.

== Architecture and interiors ==
The Baroque facade of the church is based on the design of Il Gesù in Rome. On the south-side wall of the church, at the corner of ul. Garbarska, there is the 18th century sculpture representing Golgotha with its central Crucificion. The main altar depicts the Visitation of Saint Elizabeth by Virgin Mary, and is one of the largest examples of Baroque woodcarving in Kraków. The most famous work of art in the church is the icon of Our Lady of Piasek, which can be found in a chapel on the south side of the nave. According to legend, the icon is reputed to have been miraculously completed when left unfinished by its original artist in the 15th century. It survived unscathed even during the destruction of the majority of the walls around it by the Swedes. It was later fitted with a crown designed by the artist Jan Matejko, whose own wedding was held here in 1864.

Behind the church, now completely hidden from outside view by the surrounding buildings, there is still a surviving fragment of the old Carmelite orchard.

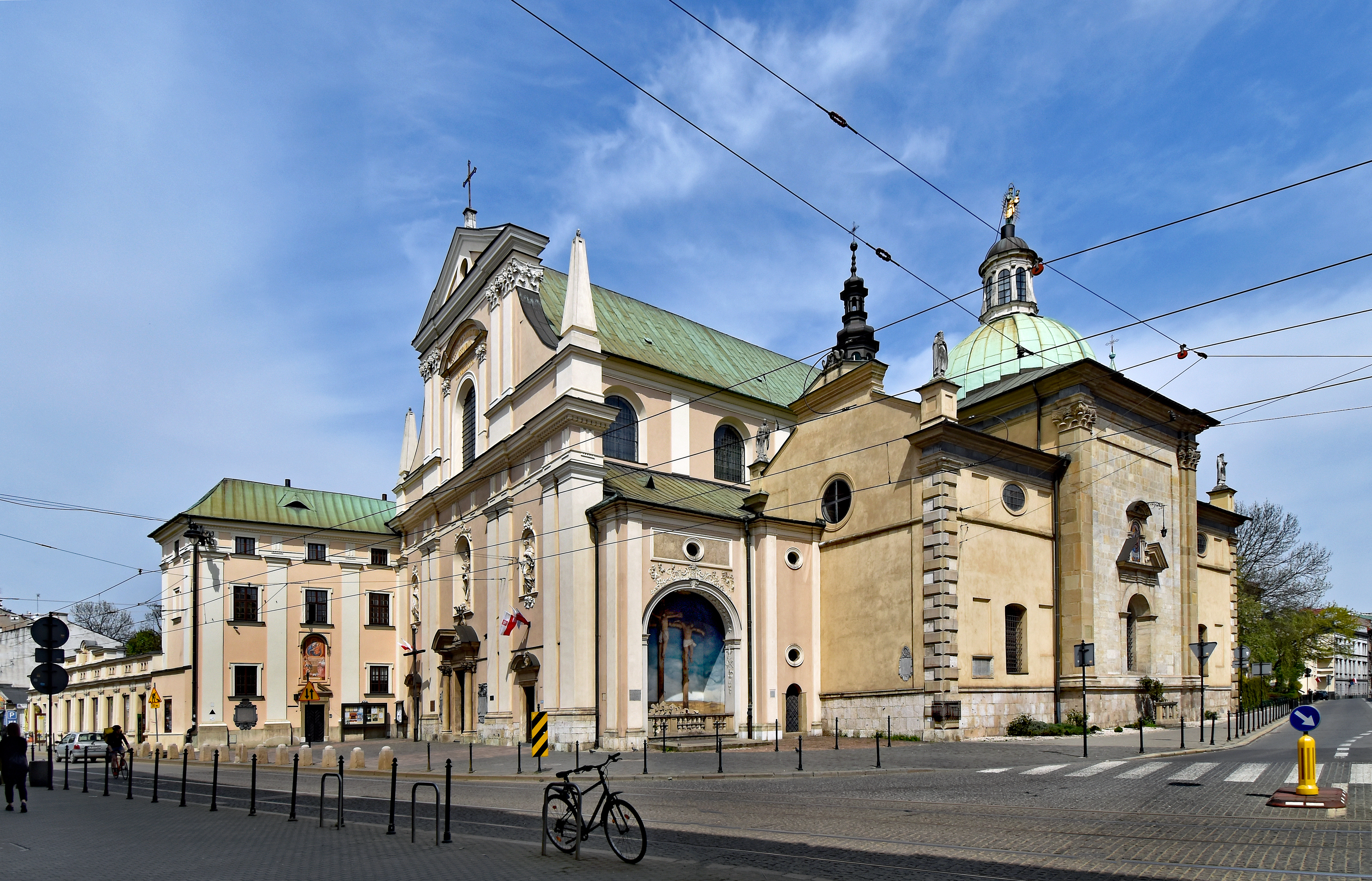
Church and monastery, view from Karmelicka Street

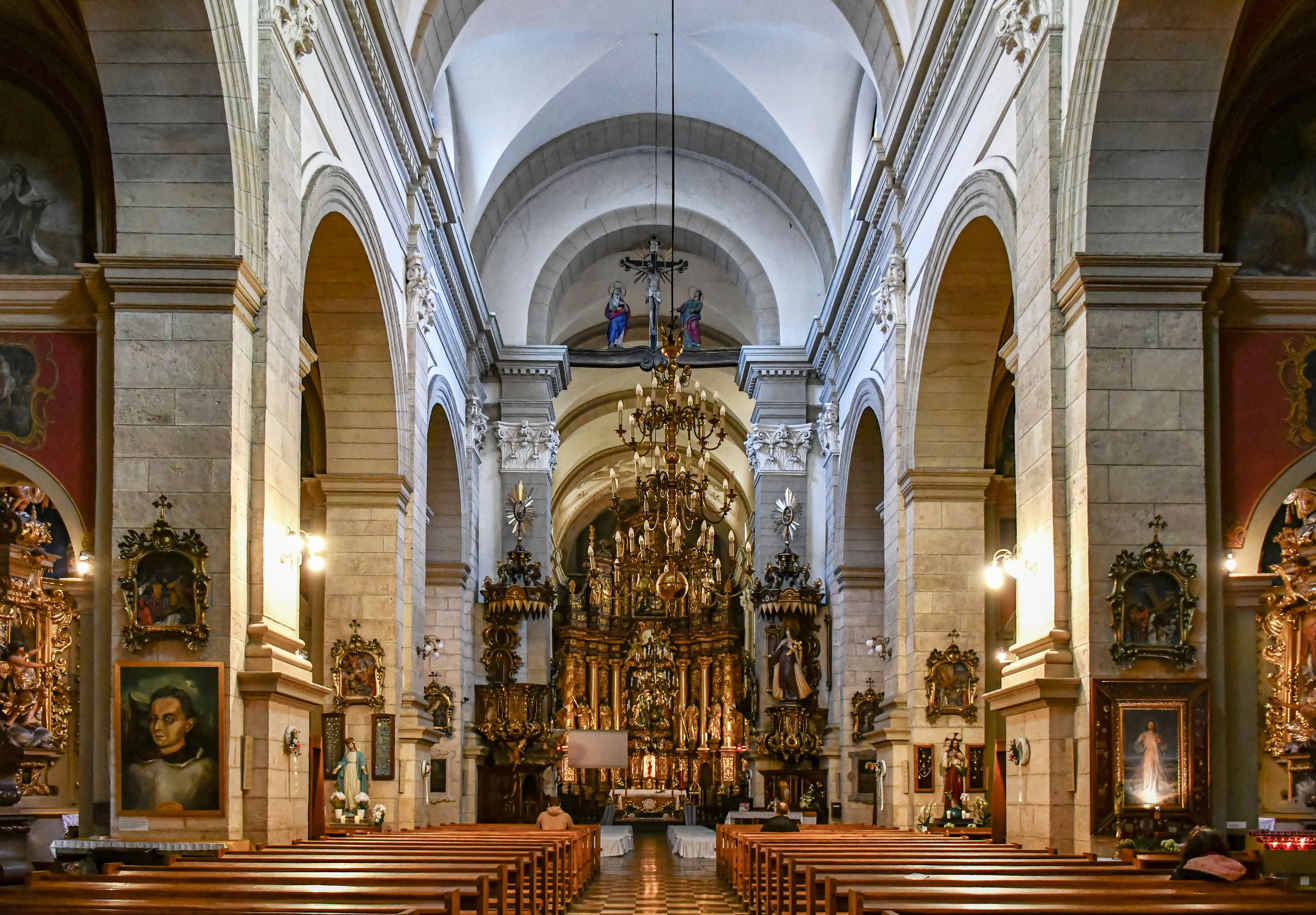
Interior of the church

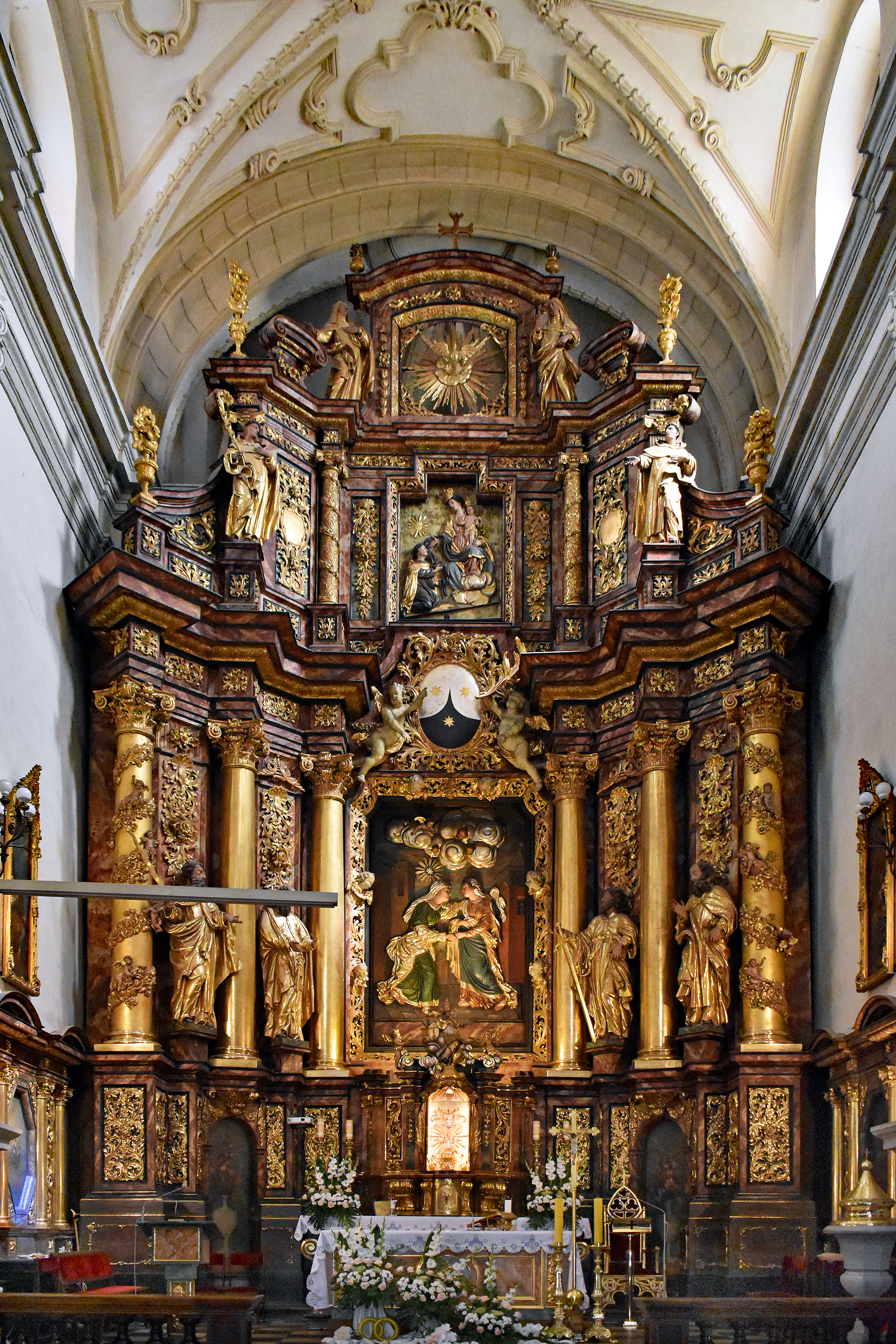
Main altar

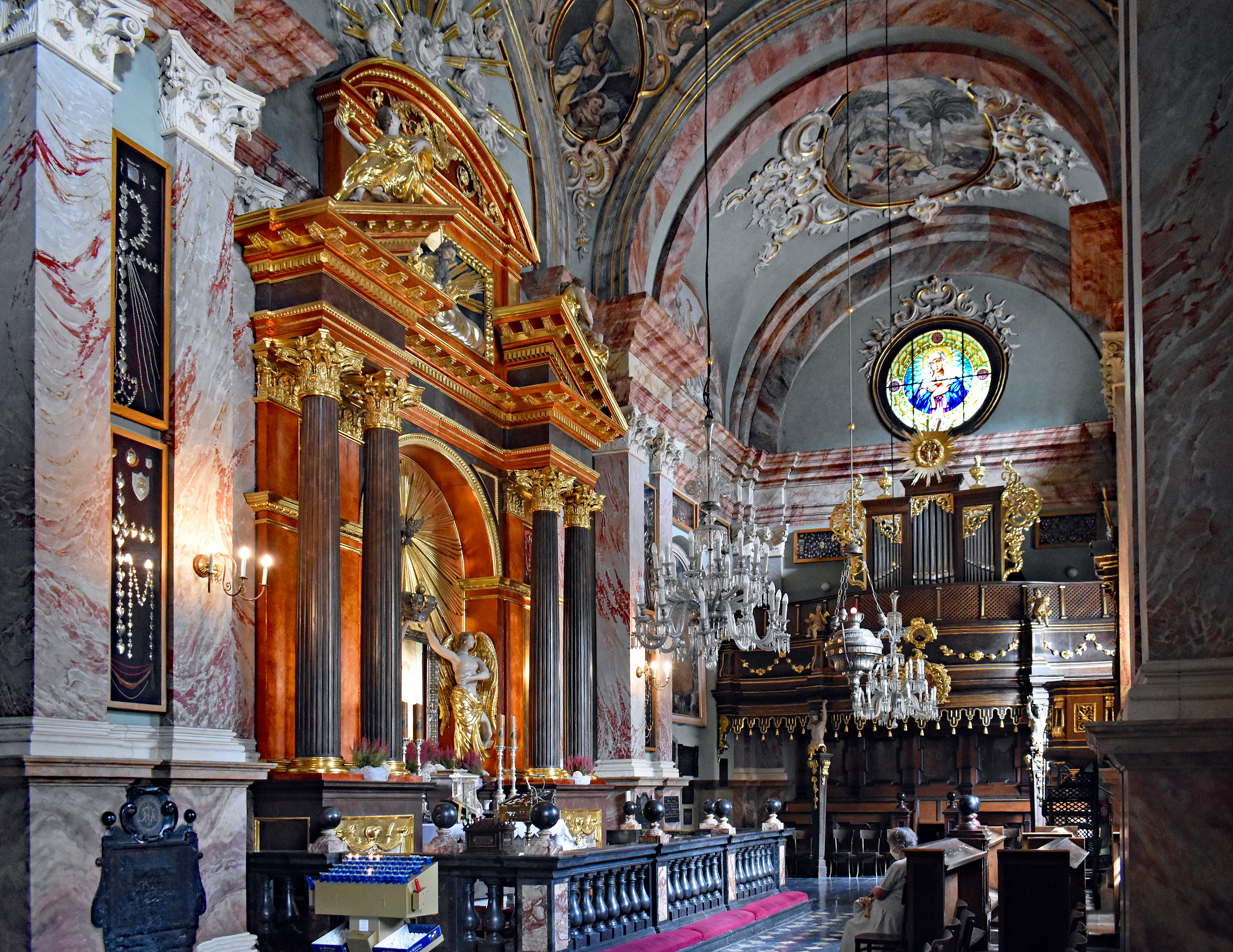
Chapel of Our Lady of Piasek, interior

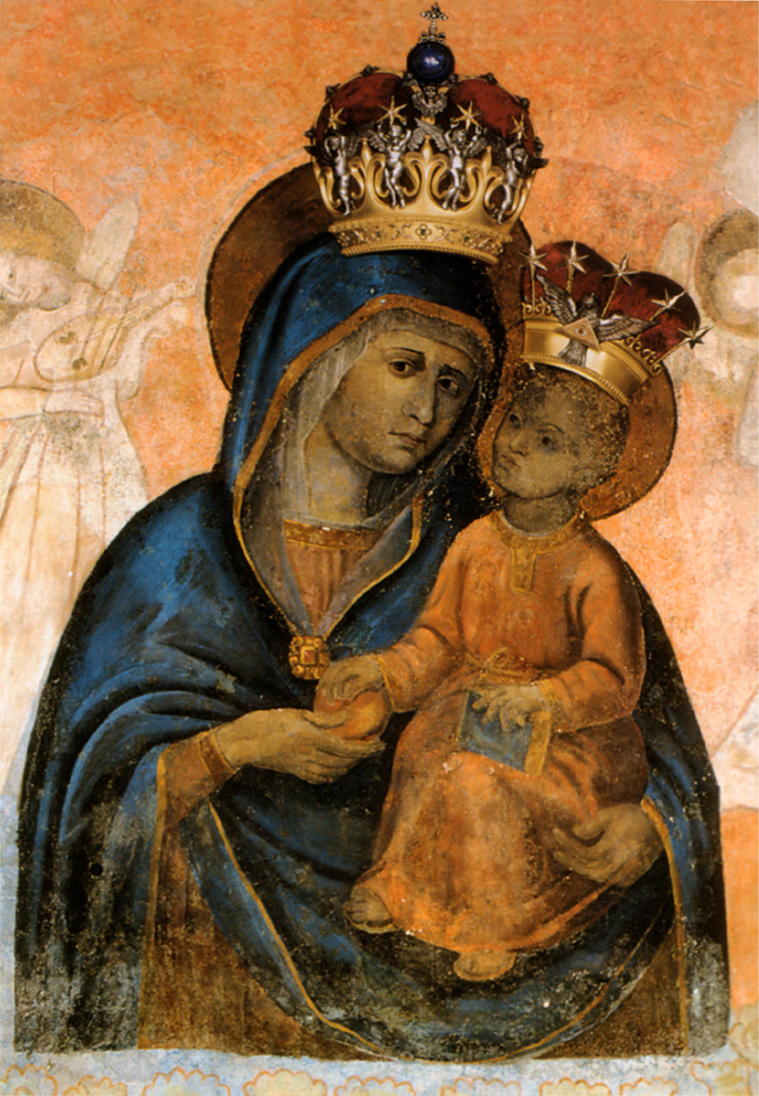
Image of Our Lady of Piasek

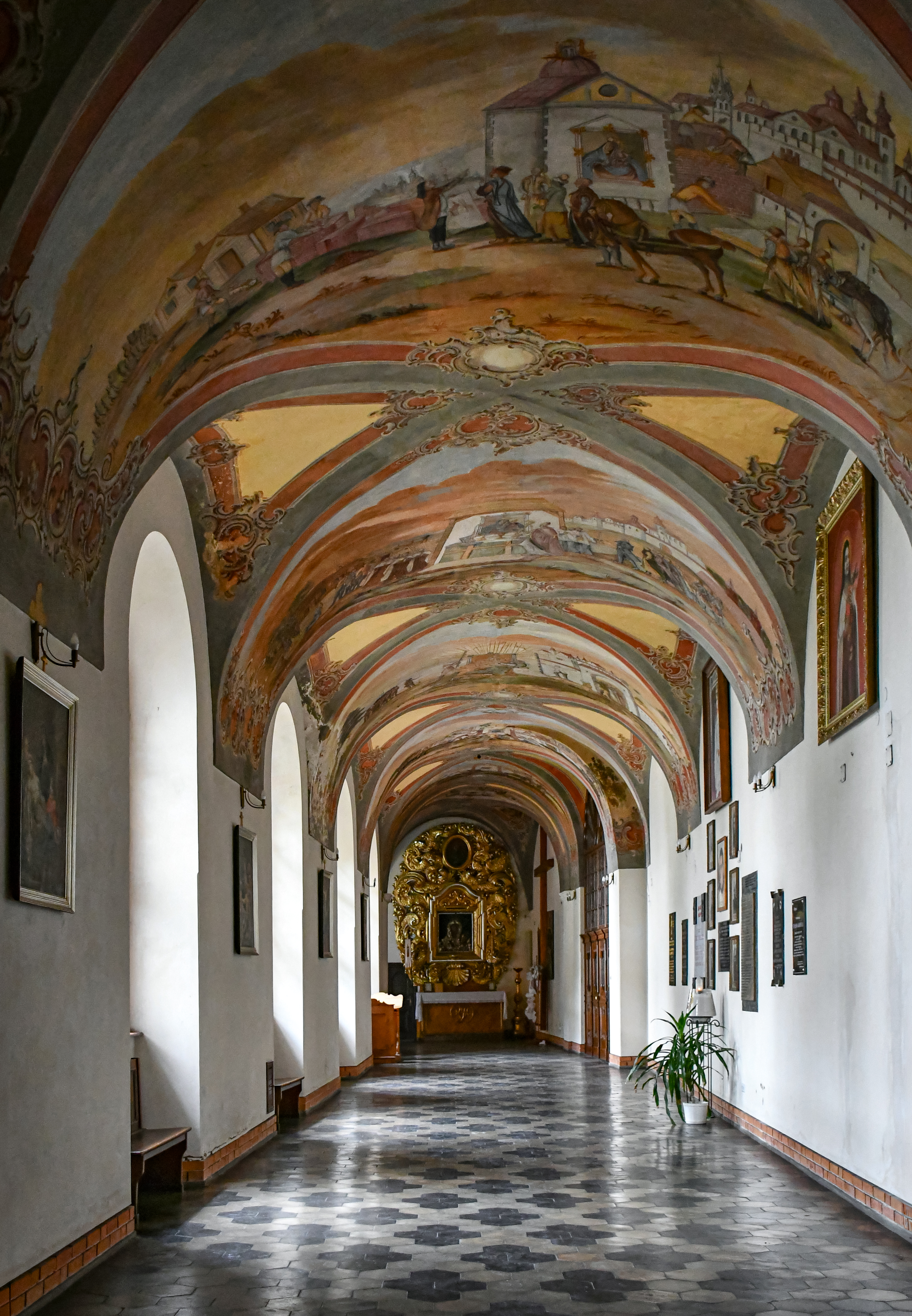
Monastery cloister

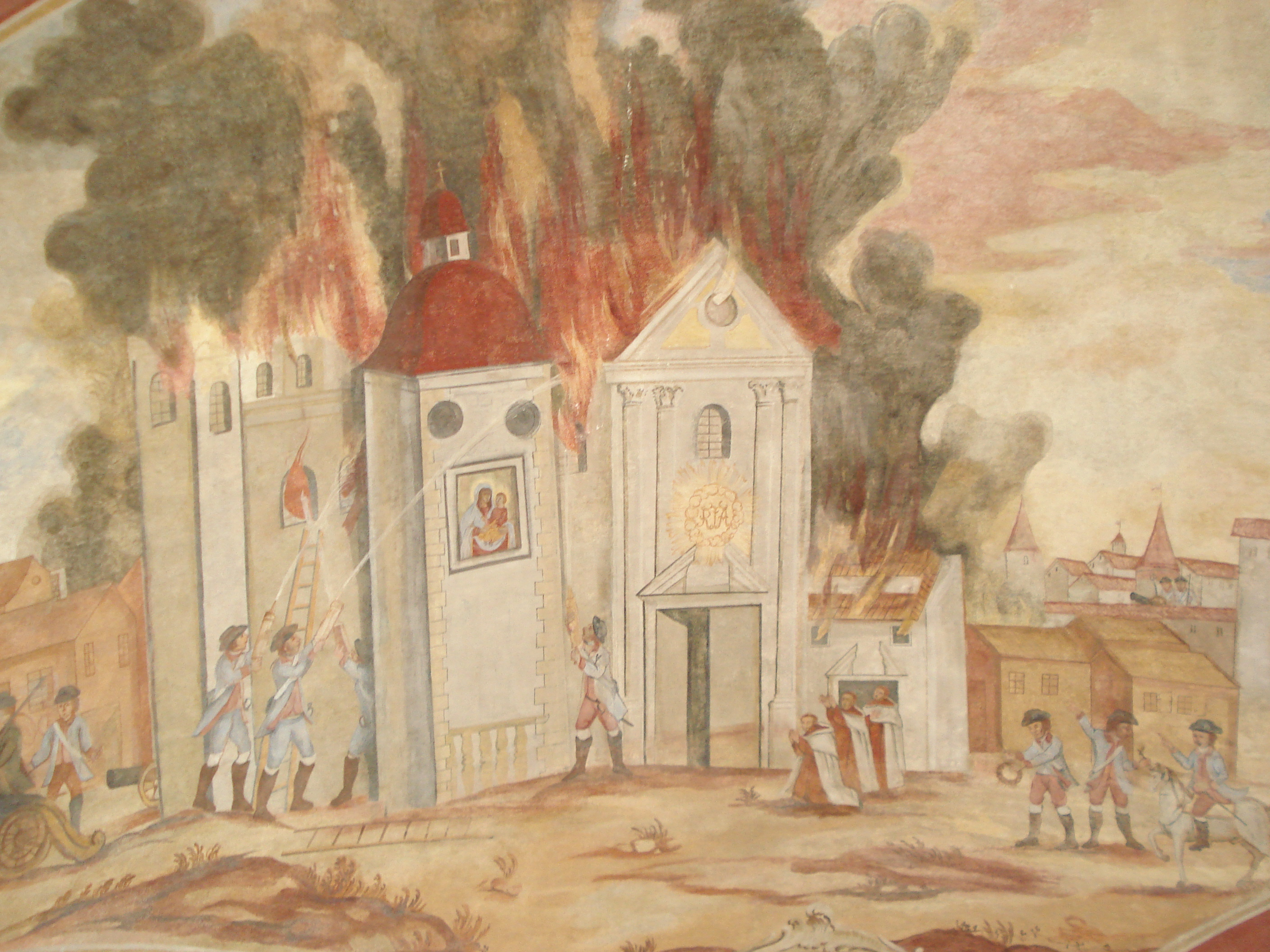
Cloister, Swedish Deluge (polychrome)

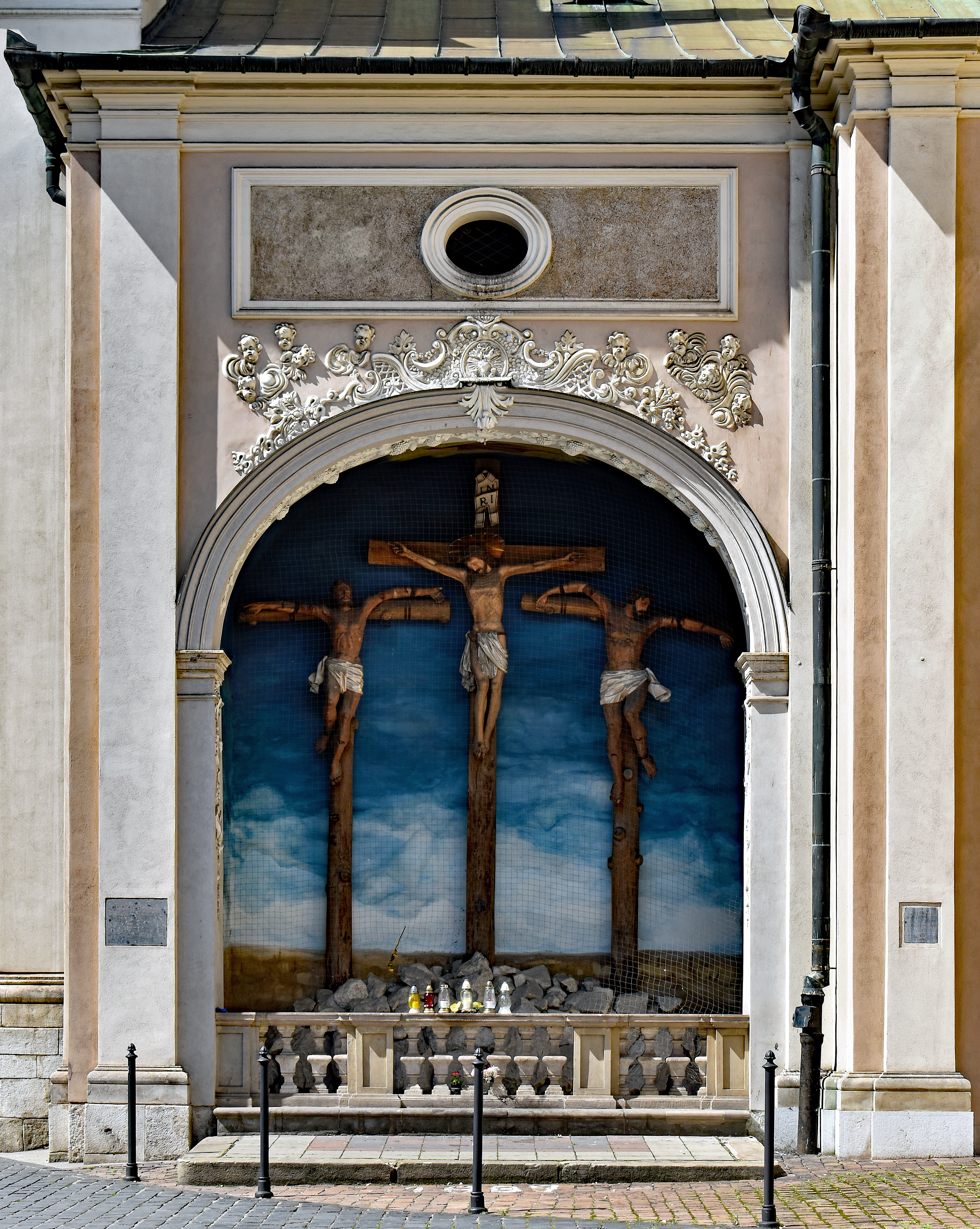
The Golgotha

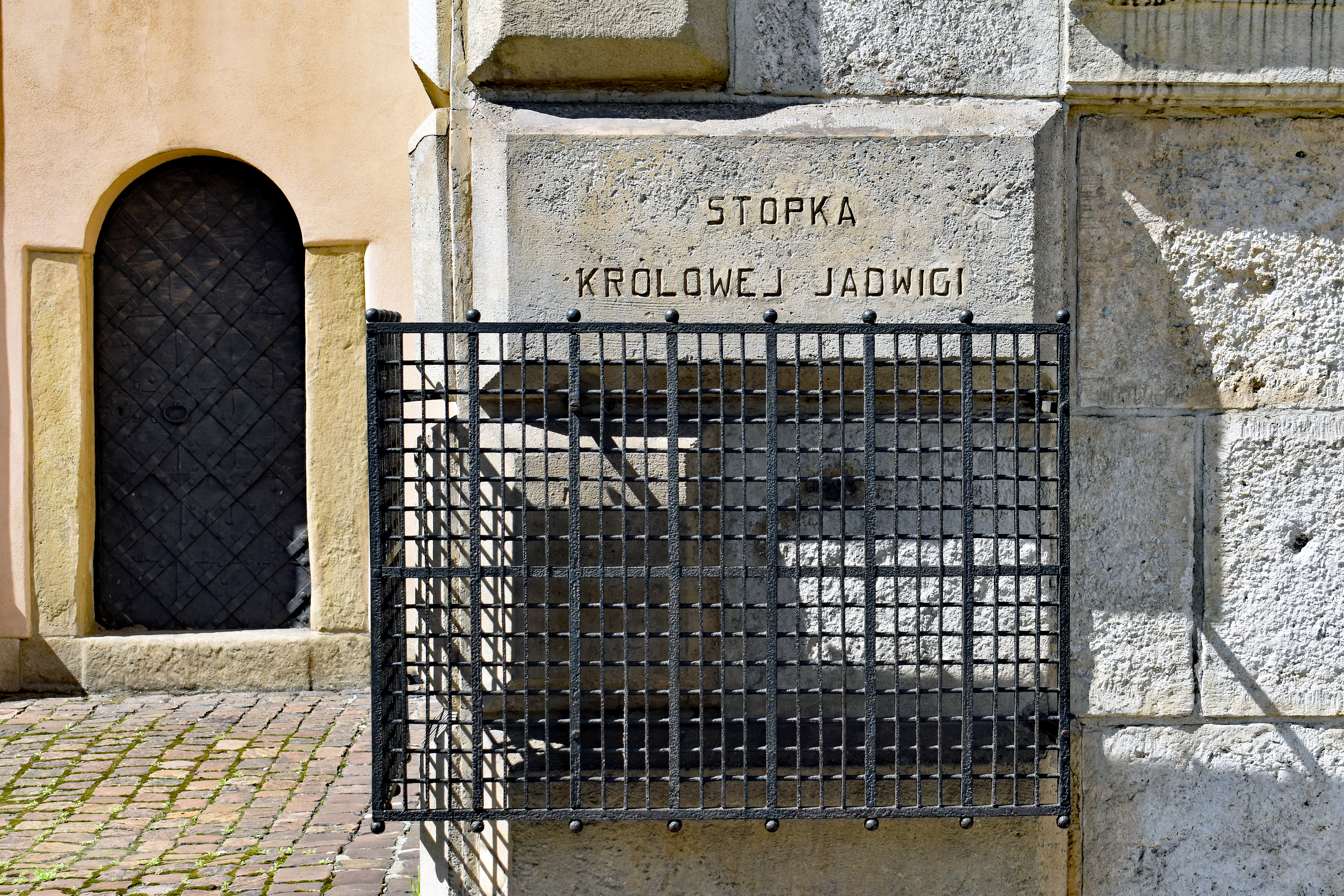
Queen Jadwiga's footer

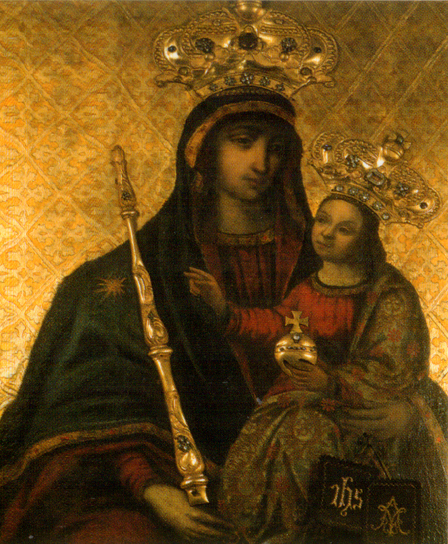
Altar of Bracka chapel

== Bibliography ==
- (in Polish) * Michał Rożek, Barbara Gądkowa Leksykon kościołów Krakowa, Wydawnictwo Verso, Kraków 2003, ISBN 83-919281-0-1 pp 136-138 (Lexicon of Krakow churches)
- (in Polish) * Praca zbiorowa Encyklopedia Krakowa, wydawca Biblioteka Kraków i Muzeum Krakowa, Kraków 2023, ISBN 978-83-66253-46-9 volume I pp 733-734 (Encyclopedia of Krakow)
