= Hippolytus (archbishop of Gniezno) =

His Excellency Hippolytus
- Archbishop of Gniezno
- Church: Roman Catholic
- Archdiocese: Gniezno
- Installed: before 1025
- Term ended: 1027
- Predecessor: Radim Gaudentius
- Successor: Bossuta Stefan

Personal details
- Born: 10th century
- Died: 1027

Hippolytus or Hipolit (died c. 1027) was an early medieval archbishop of Gniezno. His place and date of birth date are unknown but the medieval historian Jan Długosz claims that he was of noble birth and a Roman citizen. Modern scholars generally agree that he was not Polish.

He was appointed Bishop between 18 April 1025 and 25 December 1025 in Gniezno Cathedral by Bolesław I the Brave. He was primate of Poland through the last part of Boleslaw's reign and the beginning of Mieszko II Lambert's.

On April 18, 1025, he crowned Boleslaw I the Brave and on December 25, 1025, Mieszko II Lambert as the kings of Poland in his Gniezno cathedral. He died in 1027 and is buried in Gniezno Cathedral.

Religious titles
| Preceded by Radzim Gaudenty | Archbishop of Gniezno; 1025 - 1027 | Succeeded by Bossuta Stefan |
