= Martin I (archbishop of Gniezno) =

Archbishop of Gniezno

Martin I of Gniezno
- Archbishop of Gniezno
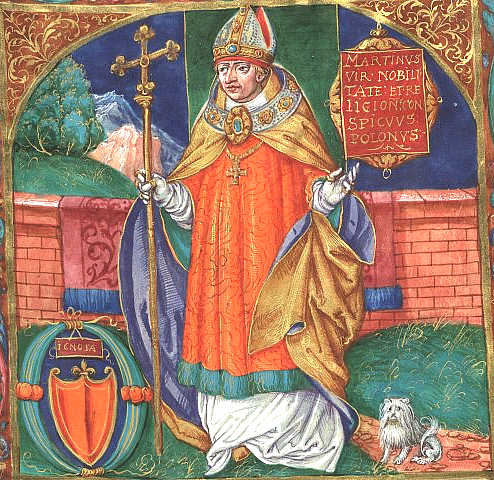
- Church: Roman Catholic Church
- Archdiocese: Gniezno
- See: Archdiocese of Gniezno
- In office: 1092/99–c. 1112/27
- Predecessor: Heinrich von Wülzburg
- Successor: Jakub of Żnin

Personal details
- Born: unknown
- Died: unknown, after 1112

Martin or Martin of Gniezno (died after 1112) was a medieval prelate based in Principality of Poland. He was Archbishop of Gniezno, head of the Polish church, from ca. 1092/99 until 1112/27. The preface of the Gesta principum Polonorum, the anonymous historical narrative whose author is usually referred to as Gallus Anonymus, begins with an address to Archbishop Martin.

Martin, as the chief churchman of the principality, was heavily involved in Polish politics in the era. He is thought to have mediated between Zbigniew and Bolesław III Wrymouth, and between these two princes and their father Władysław I Herman, in their disputes. Archbishop Martin probably favoured Zbigniew, this alliance leading to Martin's incarceration by Bolesław when the latter marched on his residence at Spycimierz c. 1106.

Religious titles
Preceded by Heinrich von Wülzburg	Archbishop of Gniezno; 1092/99–c. 1112/27	Succeeded by Jacob of Żnin
