= Bossuta Stefan =

His Excellency Bossuta Stefan
- Archbishop of Gniezno
- Church: Roman Catholic
- Archdiocese: Gniezno
- Installed: 1027
- Term ended: 1028
- Predecessor: Hippolytus
- Successor: Bogumił

Personal details
- Born: unknown
- Died: 7 March 1028

Bossuta Stefan (died 7 March 1028) or Bożętą was an Archbishop of Gniezno. Very little is known of his life including his birth date.

His first name derives from the old Slavic name Bozet or Borzęta, and it is presumed that he adopted a Christian second name. This would indicate he was an ethnic Slav.

According to the Annales regni Polonorum deperditi, the yearbook of Kraków Cathedral (Rocznik kapitulny krakowski), he succeeded Hipolit in 1027 and remained in office until his death on 7 March 1028, and the bishopric may have then remained vacant until 1076.

However, according to the fifteenth-century historian Jan Długosz, Bossuta and Stefan were two separate bishops. Dlugosz records that Stefan, was the successor to Bożętą and had sent a delegation to Rome to complain about the attack and robbery in 1038 of Gniezno Cathedral, by the Bohemian duke Břetislav I who took the relics of brothers Saint Adalbert and Bishop Radim Gaudentius. Still today, despite the rather widespread agreement to identify Bossuty with Stefan, 1038 appears sometimes as the date of his death.

Religious titles
Preceded by Hipolit	Archbishop of Gniezno; 1027–1028	Succeeded by Bogumił
