= Maria Dobroniega of Kiev =

Duchess consort of Poland from 1040 to 1058

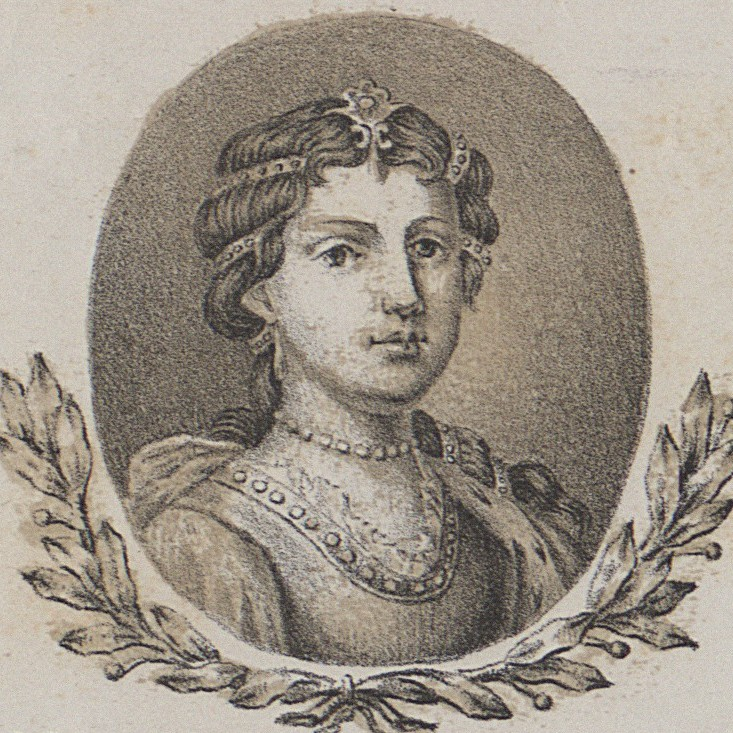

Duchess consort of Poland
- Tenure: c. 1040–1058
- Born: 1012
- Died: 13 December 1087 (aged 74–75)
- Spouse: Casimir I the Restorer (died 1058)
- Issue Detail: Bolesław II the Bold; Władysław I Herman; Mieszko Kazimierzowic; Otto Kazimierzowic; Świętosława, Queen of Bohemia
- Dynasty: Rurik
- Father: Vladimir the Great

Maria Dobroniega (after 1012 – 13 December 1087) was a princess of Kievan Rus', by marriage to Casimir I the Restorer she was titled Duchess of Poland.

== Life ==
=== Family ===
Maria was one of the younger children of Vladimir I, Grand Prince of Kiev. The identity of her mother is disputed among historians and web sources.

Grand Prince Vladimir I had married seven times and had fathered many children, legitimate and illegitimate. Anna Porphyrogeneta, his sixth wife, is known to have predeceased Vladimir by four years. Chronicle Thietmar of Merseburg, writing from contemporary accounts, mentions that Bolesław I of Poland captured Vladimir I's widow during his raid on Kiev in 1018. The historians long had no clue as to identity of this wife. The emigre historian Nicholas Baumgarten, however, pointed to the controversial record of the Genealogia Welforum and the Historia Welforum Weingartensis that one daughter of Count Kuno von Oenningen (future Duke Konrad I of Swabia) by "filia Ottonis Magni imperatoris" (Otto the Great's daughter; possibly Rechlinda Otona [Regelindis], claimed by some as illegitimate daughter and by others legitimate, born from his first marriage with Edith of England) married "rex Rugorum" (King of Rus). He interpreted this evidence as pertaining to Vladimir I's last wife. This woman is a possible identity for Maria's mother.

=== Marriage ===
Maria married around 1040 to Casimir I the Restorer, Duke of Poland. This marriage helped Casimir to gain support in his reclaim over the Polish throne. Casimir had attempted to seize the throne twice before, both times he failed. With the support of Maria's brother, Yaroslav I the Wise, Casimir was able to make a successful claim.

==== Issue ====
The couple had five children:

- Bolesław II the Bold (1043 – c. 2/3 April 1081/82)
- Władysław I Herman (1044 – c. 4 June 1102)
- Mieszko (c. 16 April 1045 – 28 January 1065)
- Otto (1046 – 1048, died in infancy)
- Świętosława (1048 – c. 1 September 1126), married in 1062 to Duke (and since 1085 King) Vratislaus II of Bohemia.

Maria's husband died on 28 November 1058. Her sixteen-year-old son, Bolesław, later (1076) became King of Poland. Bolesław II is considered one of the most capable of the Piast rulers. However, he was deposed and expelled from the country in 1079.

Maria survived her oldest son by five or six years, dying in 1087.

Maria Dobroniega of Kiev Rurikid dynasty Born: bef. 1012 Died: 1087
Royal titles
Preceded by Richeza of Lotharingia	Duchess consort of Poland; 1040–1058	Succeeded by Wyszesława of Kiev
