= Bolesław II the Bold =

Duke of Poland (1058–1076); King of Poland (1076–1079)

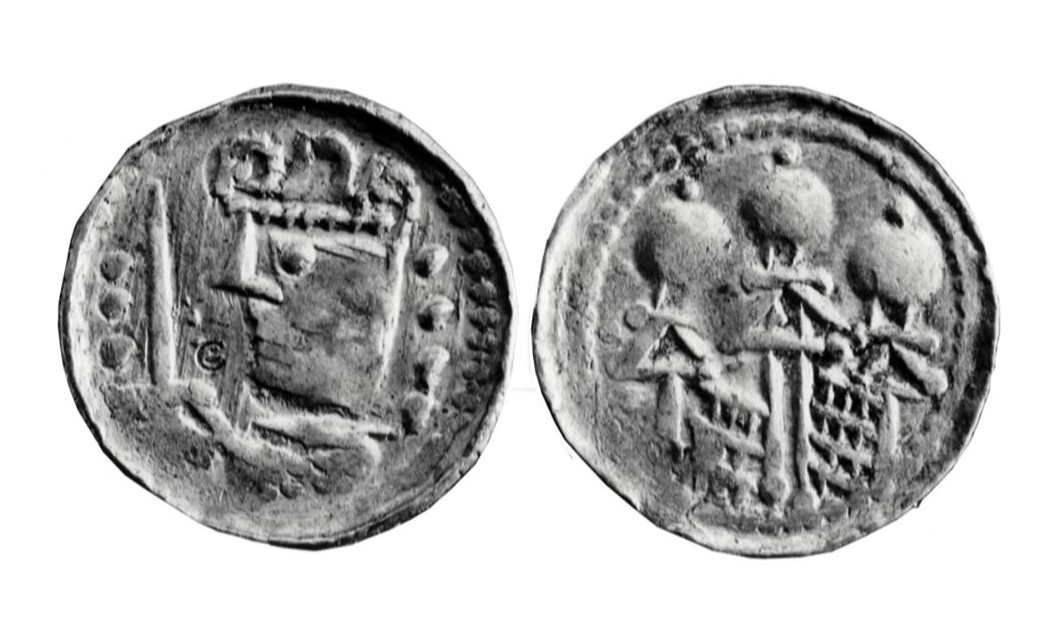
- A denar coin with Bolesław's effigy (left)

Duke of Poland
- Reign: 1058 – 1076
- Predecessor: Casimir I the Restorer
- Successor: Władysław I Herman

King of Poland
- Reign: 1076 – 1079
- Coronation: 26 December 1076; Gniezno Cathedral
- Predecessor: Mieszko II Lambert
- Born: c. 1042; Kingdom of Poland
- Died: 2 or 3 April 1081/1082; Kingdom of Hungary
- Burial: Ossiach Abbey (disputed)
- Spouse: Unnamed
- Issue: Mieszko
- Dynasty: Piast
- Father: Casimir I the Restorer
- Mother: Maria Dobroniega of Kiev

Bolesław II the Bold (Polish: Bolesław II Śmiały; c. 1042 – 2 or 3 April 1081 or 1082), also known as the Generous (Szczodry Polish), was Duke of Poland from 1058 to 1076 and King of Poland from 1076 to 1079. He was the eldest son of Duke Casimir I the Restorer and Maria Dobroniega of Kiev.

Bolesław II is considered to have been one of the most capable of the Piast rulers. In 1075, he re-established the Archdiocese of Gniezno (consecrated in 1064) and founded the Diocese of Płock. He established Benedictine monasteries in Mogilno, Lubin and Wrocław. Bolesław II was also the first Polish monarch to produce his own coinage in quantity great enough to replace the foreign coins prevalent in the country during the reigns of the first Piast kings. He established royal mints in Kraków and Wrocław and reformed the coinage, which brought considerable revenue into the royal coffers. All these efforts had an enormous influence on the economic and cultural development of the country.

According to the chronicler Gallus Anonymus, during his reign, he was called largus ("the Generous" in English, Szczodry in Polish) as he founded many churches and monasteries throughout Poland. The nickname "the Bold" (Śmiały) was only given to Bolesław II for the first time in the later Chronicle of the Polish kings, although it was considered by historiography of the 19th and 20th centuries as a contemporary nickname.

== Youth ==
Bolesław was born circa 1042 as the eldest son of Polish Duke Casimir I the Restorer and Maria Dobroniega of Kiev, daughter of Vladimir the Great and a member of the Rurikid dynasty. His birth occurred during a period of political reconstruction in Poland following a decade of internal disorder and external incursions by the Bohemians under Bretislav I. Casimir had recently returned from exile in 1039 and restored the authority of the Piast dynasty after a prolonged interregnum and civil unrest with aid from the Holy Roman Empire and the Kievan Rus'. Thus, Bolesław's upbringing was shaped by the challenges of reestablishing a unified and centralised Polish state.

From an early age, Bolesław was exposed to the workings of both domestic governance and foreign diplomacy. His schooling conceivably included instruction in statecraft, military leadership, and the ecclesiastical structures that were integral to medieval rulership, though there is no surviving record of his education. Moreover, the influence of his mother's Rus' heritage broadened his diplomatic outlook, fostering early connections with the East. His father’s efforts to reinstate authority, promote church reform, and maintain a balance between the nobility and monarchy deeply informed Bolesław's political formation whilst contributing to his assertive and forceful personality.

== Duke of Poland ==
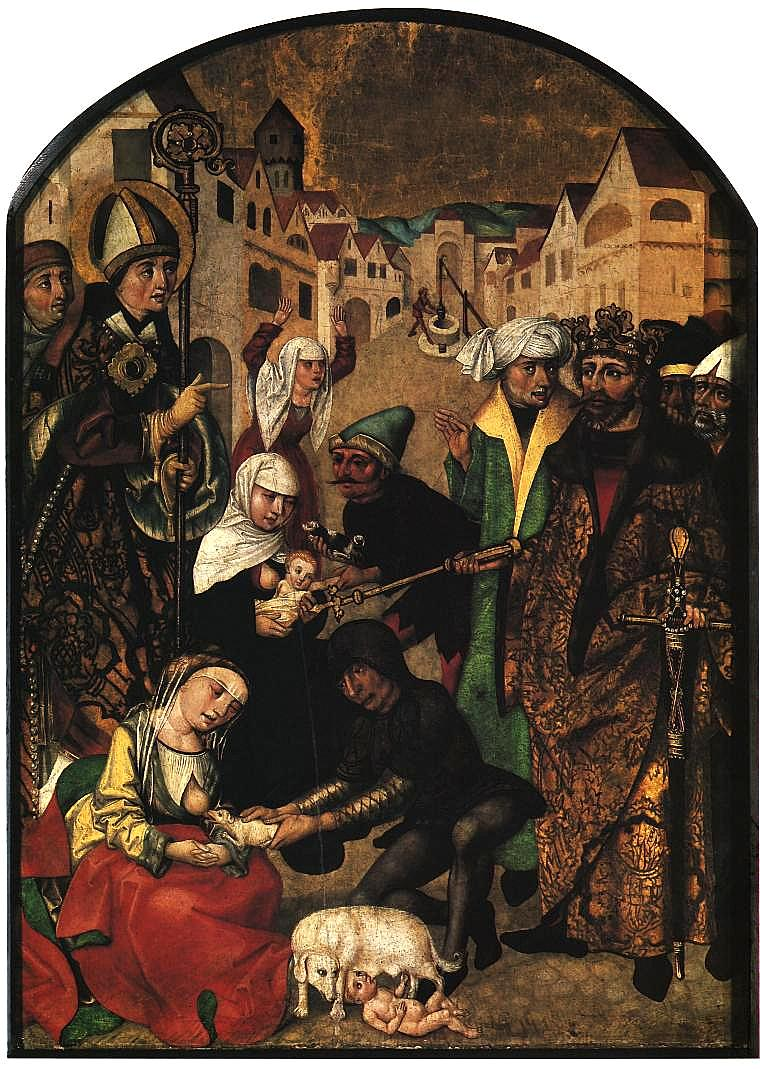
Bolesław II (on the right) punishing the wives of his knights and nobles for their alleged adultery, 1504, National Museum of Kraków

Following the death of his father Casimir in 1058, Bolesław II, as the eldest son, inherited Greater and Lesser Poland as well as the Mazovian, Pomerelian, and Silesian lands. His younger brothers Władysław I Herman and Mieszko became Governors of the remaining provinces. However, Mieszko died relatively early, in 1065, at which point his lands came under the authority of Bolesław II.

His father had left him a stabilised country; Bolesław II continued his foreign policy on surrounding his realm with allied kingdoms in order to prevail against the extensive Holy Roman Empire in the west; he aimed to have Poland eventually bordering only allied countries. This is said to be the main reason behind his numerous foreign interventions: in 1060–1063 he intervened in Hungary to aid his uncle King Béla I in the inheritance conflict with his nephew Solomon, who was backed by his brother-in-law King Henry IV of Germany. As a result, Béla, in 1061, with the support of Polish troops, gained power.

In Hungary, Bolesław II pursued the policy of cooperation with the anti-Imperial faction, which allowed him to gain political independence from the Empire but put him in conflict with the Duchy of Bohemia, an Imperial ally. Moreover, he escalated the conflict with the Přemyslid duke Vratislaus II by refusing to pay the annual homage for Silesia and spurring the Bohemian nobility to revolt. In 1063, Bolesław II unsuccessfully besieged the then-Moravian town of Hradec nad Moravicí and was forced to retreat. In the end, relations with Vratislaus II were settled to a certain extent when the latter married Princess Świętosława, Bolesław II's sister.

Meanwhile, in 1063, King Béla I of Hungary died. Bolesław II could not defend the cause of his son Géza I against the German troops of Henry IV, who finally installed Solomon on the Hungarian throne. In 1069, Grand Prince Iziaslav I of Kiev and his wife Gertruda, Bolesław's aunt, were overthrown. A Polish military campaign re-established them in power in Kiev.

In 1071, Bolesław II attacked Bohemia again. As he refused any attempt at arbitration by King Henry IV, the question was settled by an armistice between the two belligerents; however, Bolesław II, ignoring the treaty, renewed his attack in 1072 and refused to pay the tributes for Silesia to the Holy Roman Empire. Henry IV prepared for a campaign against Poland, but was hit by the outbreak of the Saxon rebellion in 1073.

Due to his involvement in Hungarian, Bohemian and Kievan affairs, Bolesław II neglected Poland's interests on the Baltic coast. Therefore, in either 1060 or 1066, Gdańsk Pomerania (Pomerelia) severed its ties to the Polish Kingdom.

== King of Poland ==
When Hildebrand of Sovana, an enemy of the German king, became Pope Gregory VII in 1073, Bolesław II saw in him a natural ally; he started to apply the Pope's reforms in the Archbishopric of Gniezno and commenced negotiations to obtain the royal crown. He spurred the ongoing revolt in Saxony, which had forced Henry IV to retreat from that region (he crushed the revolt at the Battle of Langensalza soon thereafter); the Polish king seized the occasion to launch an invasion against Henry IV's vassal, Vratislaus II of Bohemia, alongside an ally from Grand Prince Vladimir II Monomakh of Kiev.

Thanks to his support of the papal cause during the investiture controversy in the Holy Roman Empire, Bolesław II gained the royal crown of Poland: on Christmas Day of 1076, Archbishop Bogumił crowned him in the Gniezno Cathedral in the presence of a papal legate. King Henry IV's act of contrition at the Walk to Canossa in 1077 also included the imperial recognition of Bolesław II's royal title. Bolesław's new authority, along with his pride, however, caused the Polish magnates to rebel, as they feared the monarchy had started to grow too powerful.

== Deposition and death ==
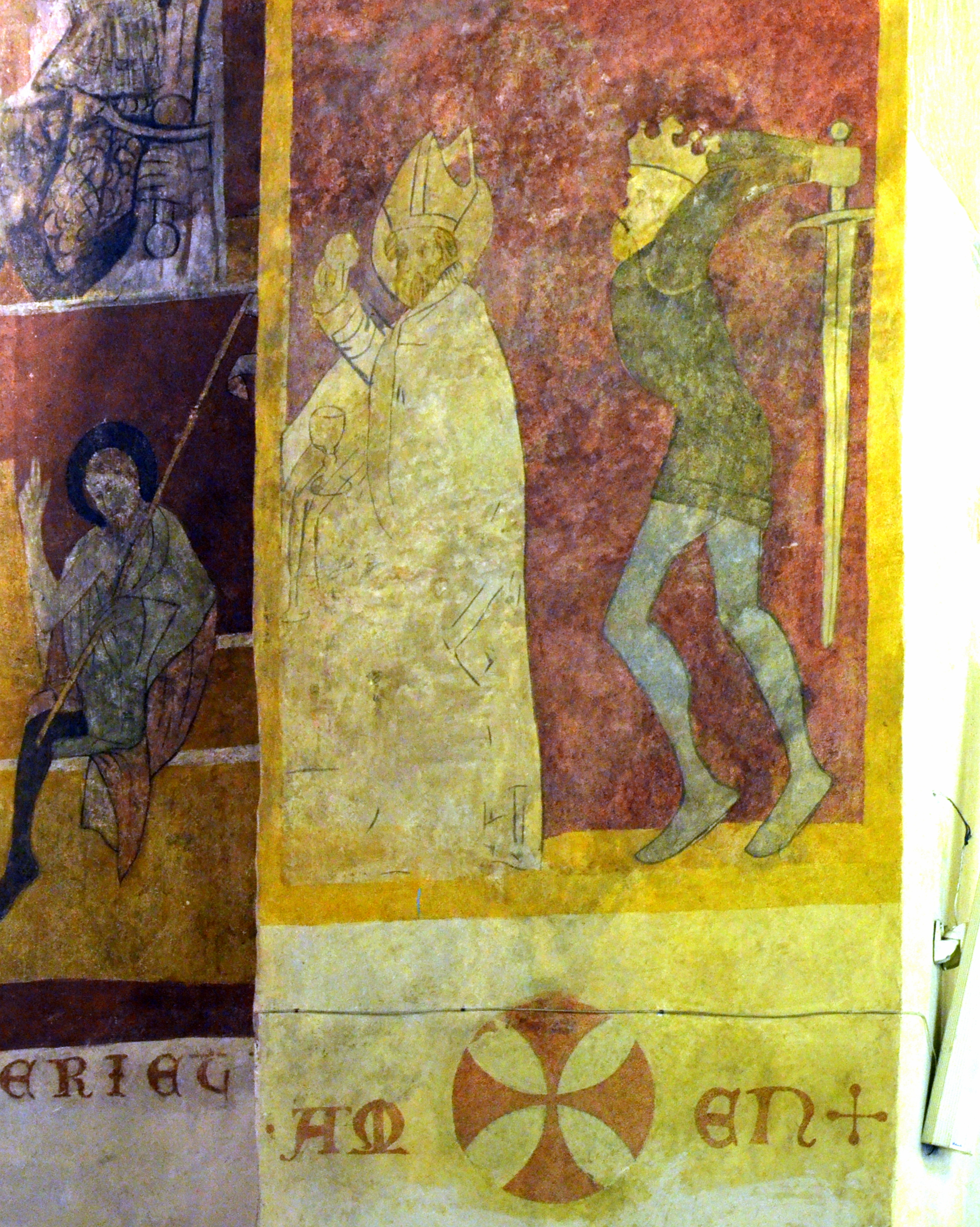
Martyrdom of Bishop Stanislaus, a medieval polychrome from Bielsko-Biała, in southern Poland

In 1077, Bolesław II's troops helped two pretenders to assume the throne: Ladislaus I of Hungary, another son of Béla I, and again Iziaslav in Kiev. In 1078, while returning from the latter campaign, the Polish troops conquered Red Ruthenia. In 1079, however, the conflict with the Polish nobles culminated into open revolt and Bolesław was deposed and banished from the country. The circumstances that led to the King's banishment hinge on the person of Bishop Stanislaus of Kraków, who had excommunicated the king for his infidelity.

From historical records it appears that Bishop Stanislaus was involved with the barons' opposition movement, plotting to remove the King and to place his brother Władysław Herman on the throne. Bolesław II unilaterally declared Stanislaus guilty of treason – Gallus Anonymus uses the word "traditor" meaning traitor. On 11 April 1079, Bolesław either ordered the death and dismemberment of the bishop or, according to Master Wincenty Kadłubek, carried out the deed himself. Kadłubek wrote his account nearly 100 years after Gallus Anonymus and a century and a half after the actual affair. His account, as well as artistic tradition, holds that this took place during the celebration of Mass. Though the bishop had privately and then publicly warned the king to repent of adultery and other vices, Bolesław chose a course of action more characteristic of his nickname, "the Bold". Kadłubek categorically condemns the murder of Stanislaus as savage and unjust; meanwhile, Gallus Anonymus passes a negative judgement on both the bishop, on account of his treason, and on Bolesław, for his shameful conduct in administering the punishment.

Bolesław found refuge at the court of King Ladislaus, who also owed his crown to the deposed king. However, according to Gallus Anonymus, Bolesław II's atrocious conduct towards his Hungarian hosts caused his premature death in 1081 or 1082 at the hands of an assassin, probably by poisoning. He was about 40 years old.

== Ossiach legend ==
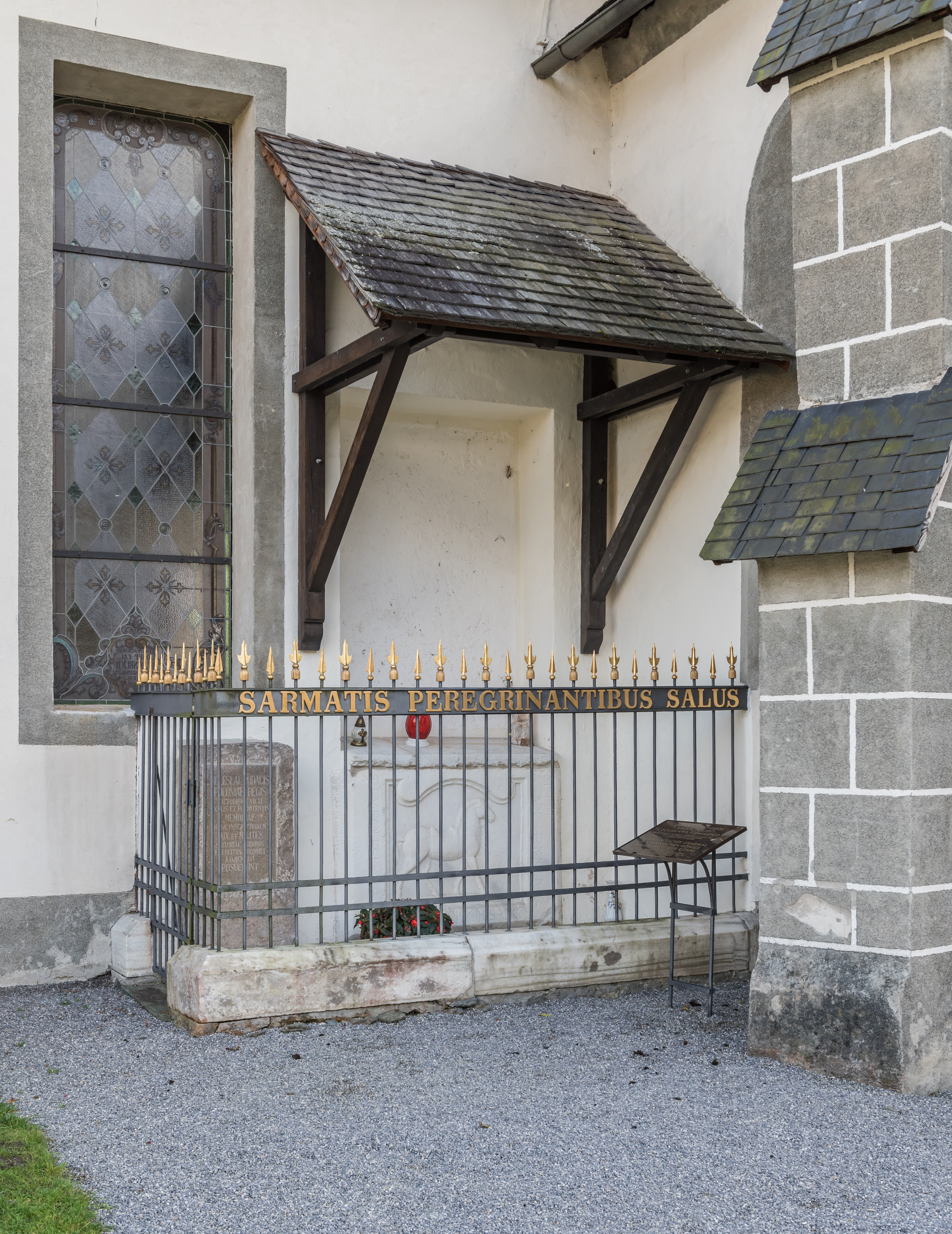
Putative tomb of Bolesław at the Ossiach Benedictine Abbey in Austria

A popular legend holds that Bolesław proceeded to Rome to beg forgiveness from Pope Gregory, who imposed on him to wander incognito as a mute repentant. On a summer evening in 1082, he reached the Benedictine Abbey at Ossiach in Carinthia, where he was received and did all kinds of hard work until he was finally reconciled in the Sacrament of Penance and died.

At the walls of Ossiach, there exists a tomb bearing the depiction of a horse and the inscription Rex Boleslaus Polonie occisor sancti Stanislai Epi Cracoviensis ("Bolesław, King of Poland, murderer of Saint Stanislaus, Bishop of Kraków"). In 1960, at the direction of Countess Karolina Lanckorońska, the tomb was opened and indeed revealed male bones and the remains of a Polish knight's armour dating from the 11th century.

The legend, however, dates from centuries after the king's death (it was first mentioned by the chronicler Maciej Miechowita in 1499). His burial place actually remains unknown. Another popular hypothesis about the fate of his remains claims that in 1086 they were transferred to the Benedictine abbey of Tyniec near Kraków.

== Marriage, issue and sexuality ==
Before 1069, Bolesław II married an unknown woman, whose identity is debated, and had by her one known son, Mieszko.

Bolesław's reluctance to marry, being still single at 25, has led his critics to accuse him of homosexuality, most notably by Jan Długosz for the "sin of sodomy"; this was motivated more likely by politics as a smear campaign but it cannot be ruled out that Bolesław might have been bisexual.

Bolesław II the Bold Piast Dynasty Born: ca. 1043 Died: 2 or 3 April 1081
Preceded by Casimir I the Restorer	Duke of Poland; King from 1076; 1058 – 1079	Succeeded by Władysław I Herman
