= Wülzburg =

Coordinates: 49°1′32″N 11°0′19″E

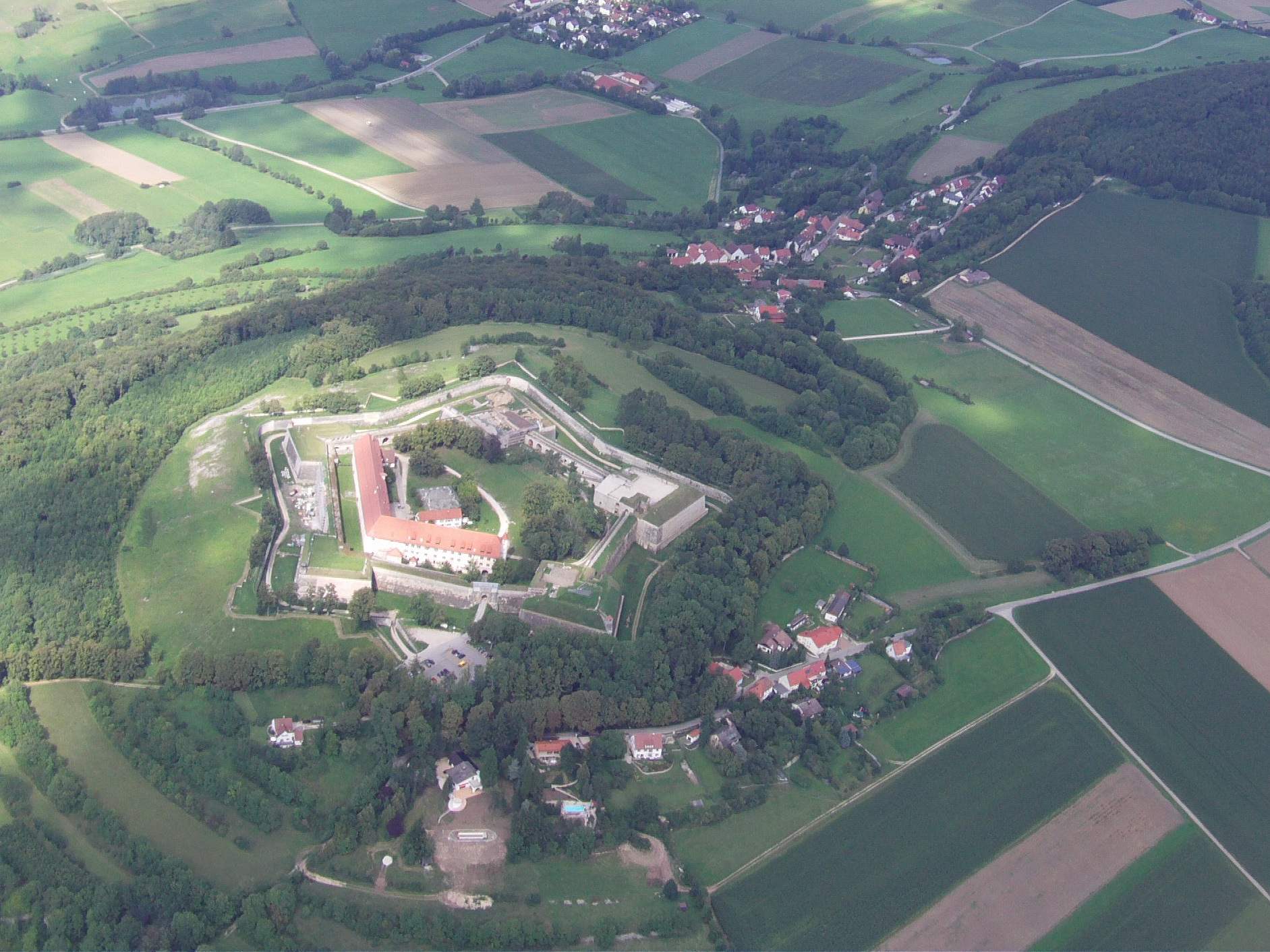
The Fortress

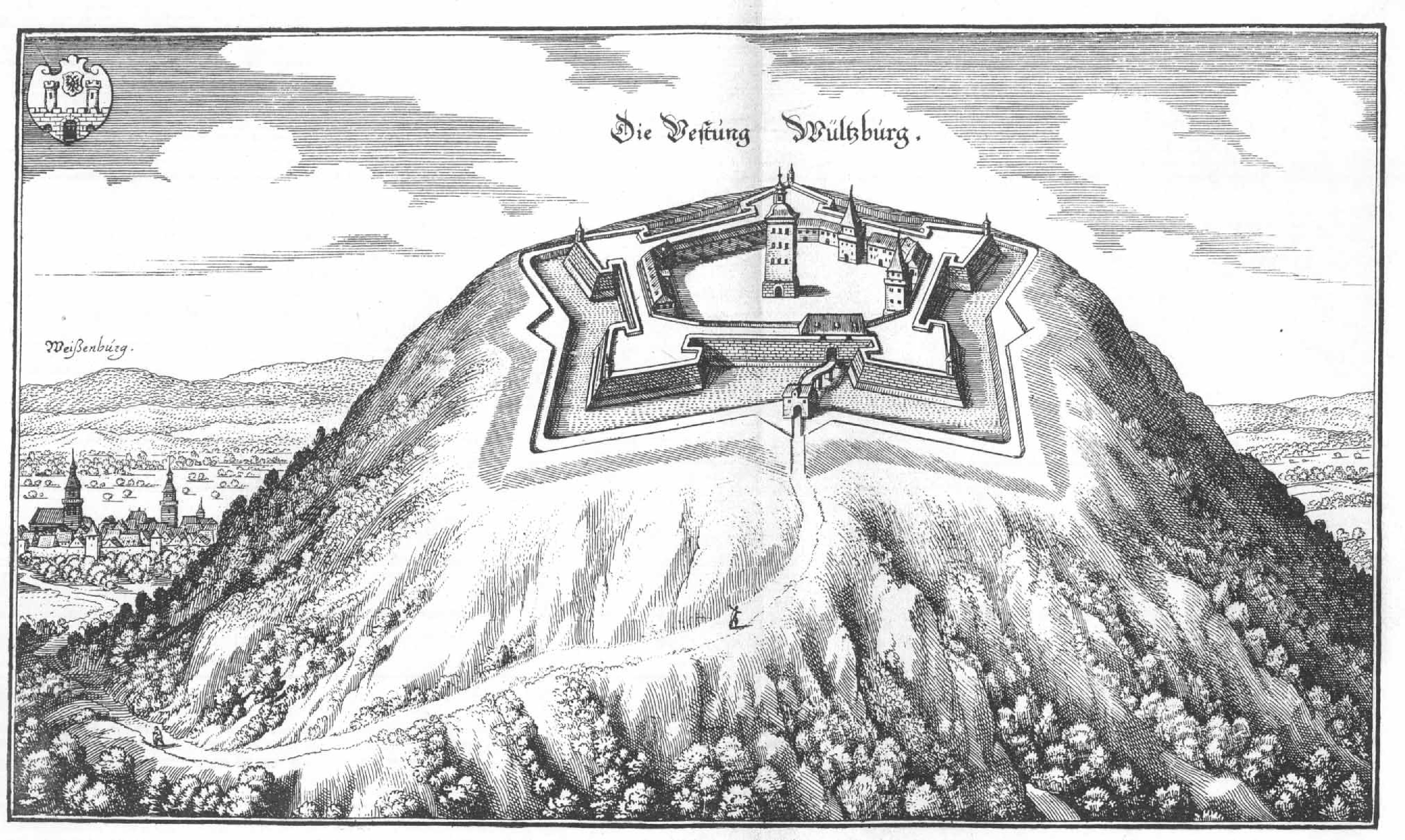
The fortress in 1656

Wülzburg is a historical fortress of the Renaissance-age in Germany. It is about two kilometres (one mile) east of the center of Weißenburg in Bayern. It stands on a hill 200 metres (660 ft) above Weißenburg, at an elevation of 630.5 metres (2,069 ft), and was originally a Benedictine monastery dating from the 11th century.

It is one of the best-preserved Renaissance fortresses in Germany. Today it is as Ortsteil (locality) a part of the city of Weißenburg. It was converted into a fortress from 1588 to 1605 by George Frederick, Margrave of Brandenburg-Ansbach.

In the 19th century it was a garrison of the Bavarian Army. During World War I, Charles DeGaulle was imprisoned at the Wülzburg. The Nazis also used it as a prison camp during World War II; it was here that the Czech composer Erwin Schulhoff was held for over a year before he died of TB. After the war it was a refugee camp.
