= Judith of Bohemia =

Duchess of Poland from 1080 to 1086

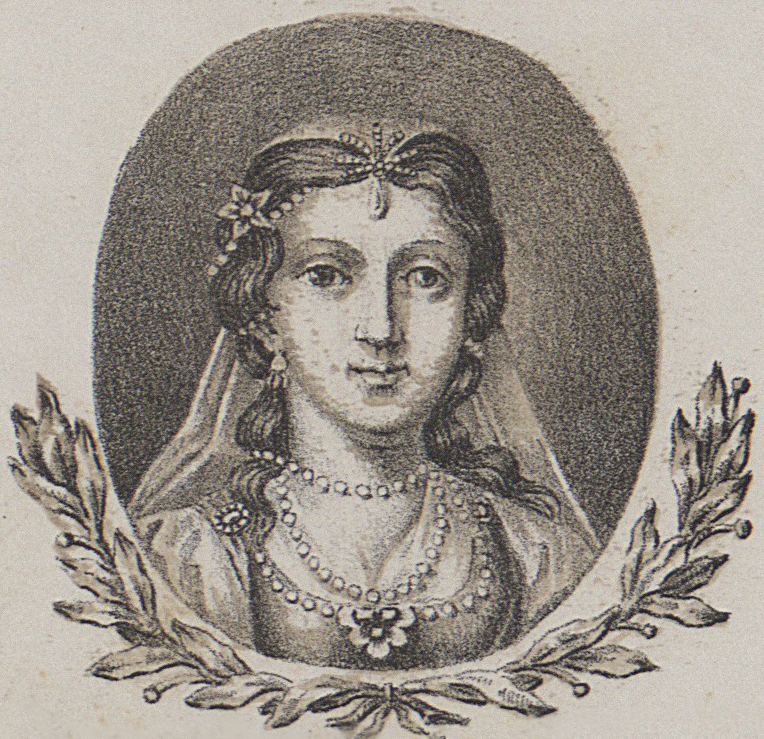
- Judith of Bohemia

Duchess consort of Poland
- Tenure: 1080–1086
- Predecessor: Wyszesława of Kiev
- Successor: Judith of Swabia
- Born: c. 1056/58; Prague, Bohemia
- Died: 25 December 1086; Płock, Poland
- Burial: Płock Cathedral
- Spouse: Władysław Herman
- Issue: Bolesław Wrymouth
- House: Přemyslid
- Father: Vratislaus II of Bohemia
- Mother: Adelaide of Hungary

Judith of Bohemia (Judita in Czech, Judyta in Polish, c. 1056/58 – 25 December 1086), also known as Judith the Přemyslid, was a member of the Přemyslid dynasty and duchess of Poland by marriage. She was a daughter of Duke Vratislaus II of Bohemia and Adelaide of Hungary, and was married to Władysław Herman.

== Early life ==
Judith was born into the Přemyslid dynasty. She was the second of four children born to Vratislaus II of Bohemia and his second wife, Adelaide of Hungary. Her father became duke in 1061 and her mother died the next year.

== Duchess of Poland ==
Around 1080, Judith married Duke Władysław Herman of Poland to solidify the recently established Bohemian-Polish alliance. According to contemporary chroniclers, Duchess Judith performed remarkable charity work, helping the needy and ensuring the comfort of subjects and prisoners. After almost five years of childless marriage, the necessity for an heir increased:

Because she was barren pray to God every day with tears and orations, made sacrifices and paying debts, helping widows and orphans, and given very generous amounts of gold and silver for the monasteries, commanded the priests to pray to the saints and the grace of God for a child.

On 10 June 1085, Judith and her husband were present at the coronation of her father, Vratislaus II, as the first king of Bohemia. One year later, on 20 August 1086, she gave birth to the long-awaited son and heir, Bolesław Wrymouth. She never recovered from the effects of childbirth and died on 25 December. She was buried in Cathedral of the Blessed Virgin Mary of Masovia in Płock.

Judith of Bohemia Přemyslid dynasty Born: c. 1056/58 Died: 25 December 1086
Royal titles
Preceded by Wyszesława of Kiev	Duchess consort of Poland; 1080–1086	Succeeded by Judith of Swabia
