= Władysław I Herman =

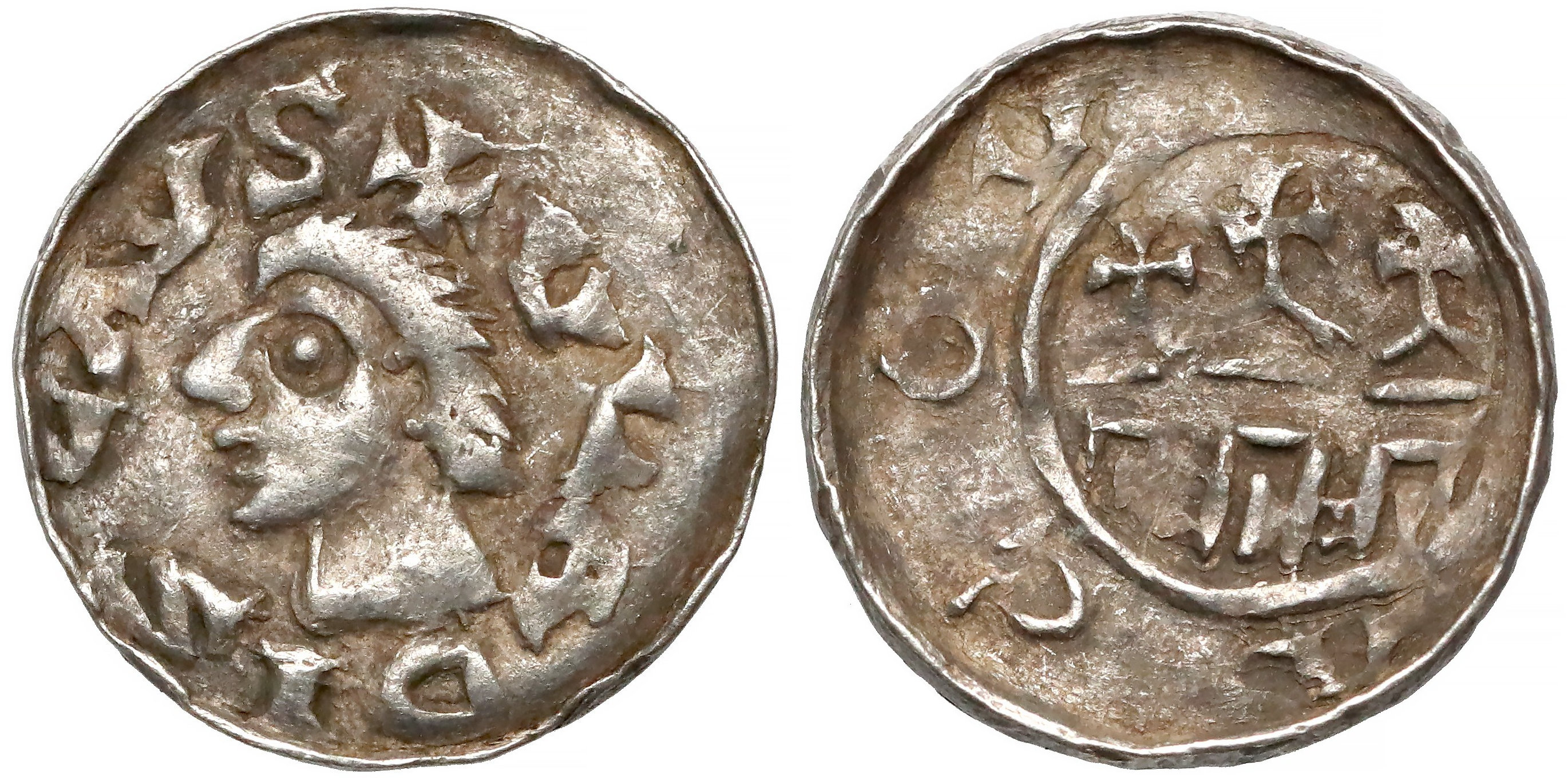
- Władysław's effigy on a denar coin (left)

Duke of Poland
- Reign: 1079 – 1102
- Predecessor: Bolesław II the Generous
- Successor: Zbigniew of Poland and Bolesław III Wrymouth
- Born: c. 1044; Poland
- Died: 4 June 1102 (aged 58); Płock, Poland
- Burial: Masovian Blessed Virgin Mary Cathedral, Płock, Poland
- Spouses: Unknown Polish woman Judith of Bohemia; Judith of Swabia
- Issue more...: Zbigniew; Bolesław III Wrymouth; Agnes I, Abbess of Quedlinburg
- House: Piast
- Father: Casimir I the Restorer
- Mother: Maria Dobroniega of Kiev

Władysław I Herman (c. 1044 – 4 June 1102) was the Duke of Poland from 1079 until his death in 1102.

Władysław ruled during a period of political fragility following the turbulent reign of his brother, Bolesław II the Bold. He was a member of the Piast dynasty, and came to power after Bolesław II was deposed and exiled due to a conflict with the Roman Catholic Church that resulted in the martyrdom of Stanislaus, Bishop of Kraków. Władysław's accession marked a significant shift in governance, as his rule emphasized stability, compromise, and avoidance of open confrontation.

Unlike his predecessor, Władysław I Herman exercised relatively limited personal authority. Much of the effective power during his reign was held by magnates, most notably Sieciech as the count palatine, whose influence over state affairs became a defining feature of the period. Władysław pursued a cautious foreign policy, maintaining close ties with the Holy Roman Empire and the Kingdom of Bohemia, and refrained from expansionist ambitions. His reign is often characterized by decentralization, which reduced ducal control but helped prevent major external conflicts.

Władysław I Herman’s legacy is closely connected to the succession struggles between his sons, Zbigniew and Bolesław III Wrymouth. Toward the end of his reign, Poland was effectively divided between them, reflecting the weakening of central authority. Although frequently portrayed as a weak and passive ruler, his extensive church patronage and conciliatory policies played a significant role in stabilizing Poland and preserving dynastic continuity within the Piast state. Władysław I Herman died in 1102 and was buried in Płock Cathedral.

== Accession ==
Władysław was the second son of the Polish duke Casimir the Restorer and Maria Dobroniega of Kiev. As the second son, Władysław was not destined for the throne. However, due to the flight from Poland of his older brother Bolesław the Bold in 1079, he became Duke of Poland. Opinions vary on whether Władysław played an active role in the plot to depose his brother or whether he was handed the authority simply because he was the best candidate to replace Bolesław.

== German relations ==
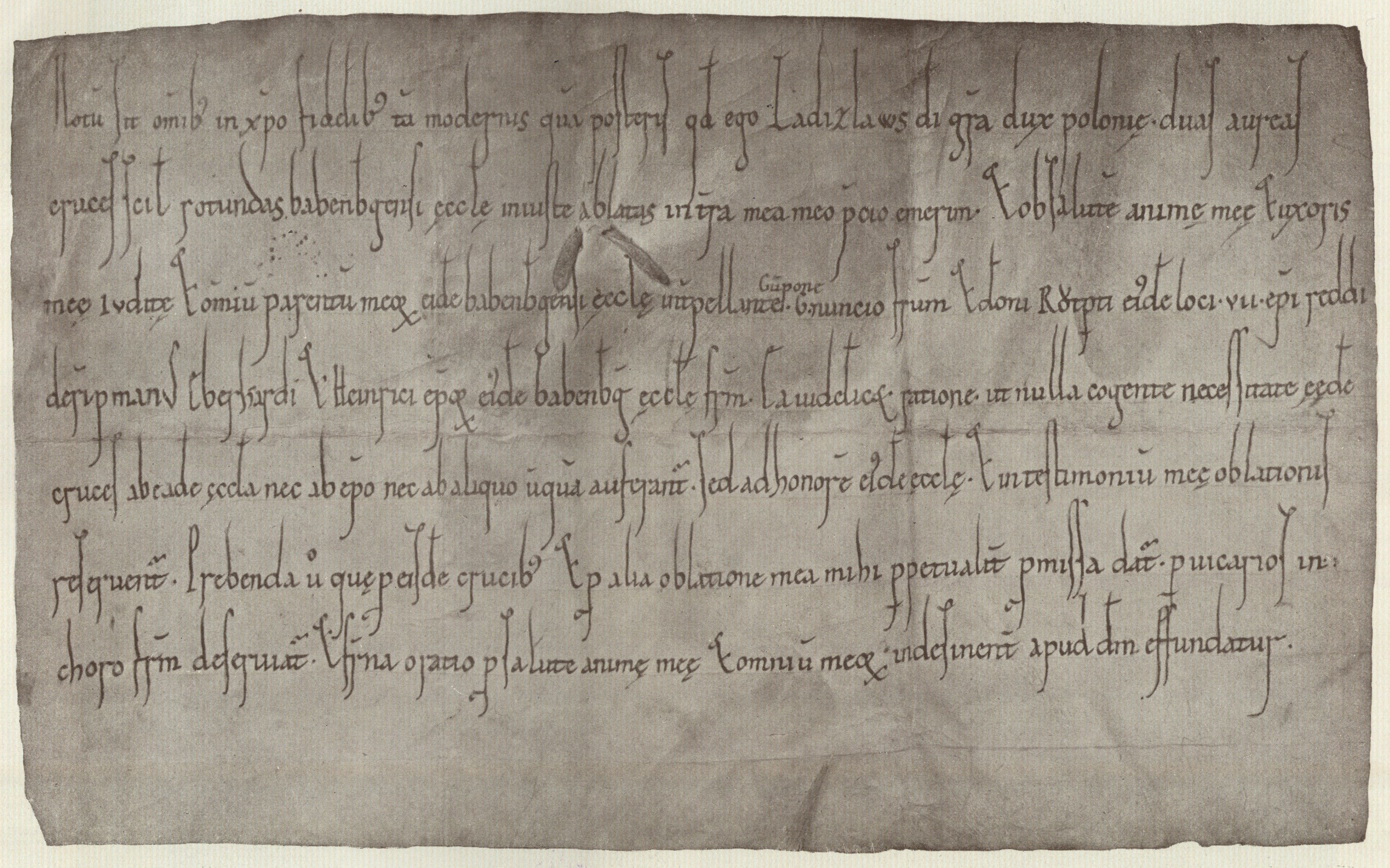
A letter sent by Władysław Herman from Poland to Bamberg Cathedral. It is the oldest extant document sent by a Polish ruler.

In 1080, in order to improve the relations between Poland and Bohemia, Władysław married Judith, the daughter of Duke Vratislaus II of Bohemia, a vassal of the Holy Roman Empire. After this, Władysław's foreign policy gravitated strongly towards appeasing the Holy Roman Empire, and he accepted the overlordship of Emperor Henry IV. While Vratislaus was declared a king in 1085 by Emperor Henry, Władysław never pursued the kingship. Soon after, he was forced by the barons of Poland to recall his nephew Mieszko Bolesławowic from exile in Hungary. Mieszko accepted the overlordship of his uncle and gave up his claim to Poland in exchange for becoming first in the line of succession. Władysław was forced to accept the terms of his nephew, because his eldest and only son at that time, Zbigniew, was born from a union not recognized by the church. Władysław's relations with Henry considerably improved after Judith of Bohemia died and Władysław married Henry's sister Judith, dowager queen of Hungary, in 1089.

Władysław abandoned the alliance with Hungary favored by his deposed brother, and joined the anti-papal camp. He also resumed paying tribute for Silesia to Bohemia. In addition, Kraków and Cieszyn were ceded to Bohemia, and Lubusz Land was lost to Germany, while Przemyśl Land in the east was lost to Halych-Ruthenia. Władysław did make attempts to regain control of Pomerania, and through numerous expeditions was temporarily (1090–1091) able to do so.

== Domestic difficulties ==
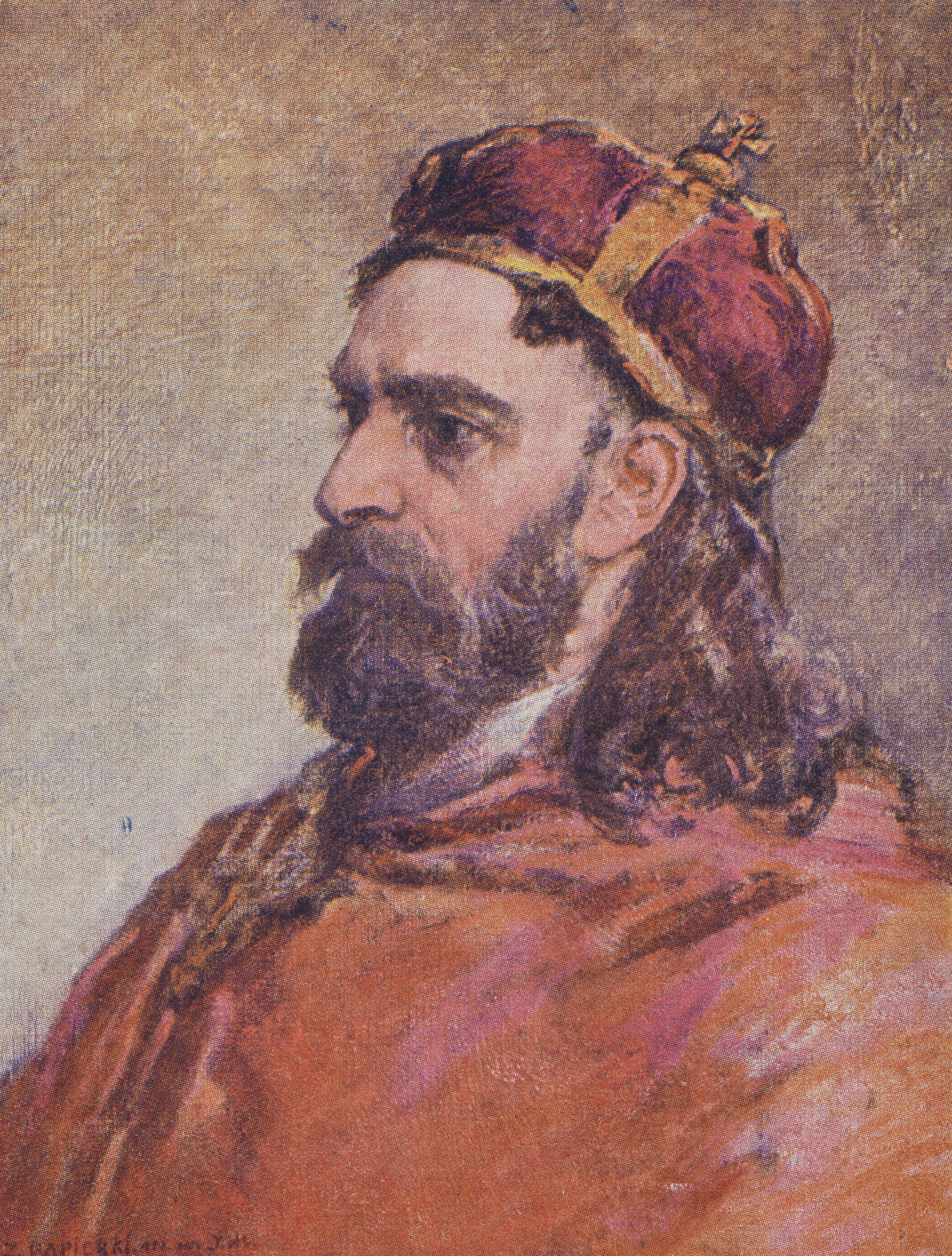
Drawing by Jan Matejko from the cycle Poczet królów i książąt polskich

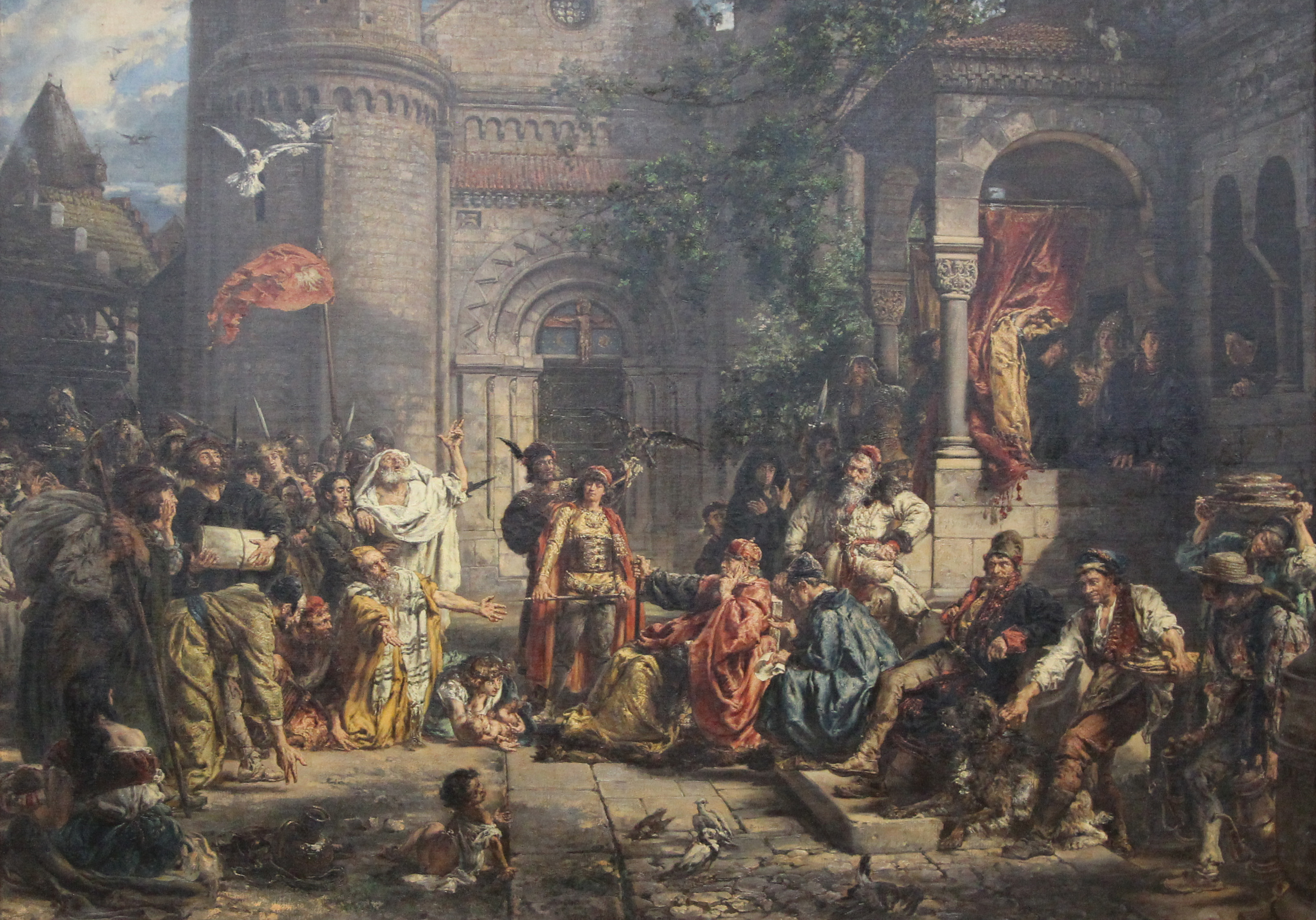
Reception of Jews in Poland by Władysław Herman in the year 1096. Painting by Jan Matejko from 1893, held at the National Museum, Lublin.

Although Władysław was formally the duke of Poland, in reality, the barons who banished his brother used this victory to strengthen their position. It is not surprising, therefore, that within a short time Władysław was forced to give up the government to his count palatine (Polish: wojewoda), a nobleman named Sieciech. Sieciech's administration of the realm was negatively perceived by those of the barons who were not the beneficiaries of the power shift.

The birth of Bolesław Wrymouth to Władysław and Judith of Bohemia changed the political situation in Poland. Władysław's nephew Mieszko was already seventeen at that time and was, by the previous agreement made after his return, the first in line to succeed. In 1089, Mieszko died under mysterious circumstances, probably poisoned on the orders of Sieciech and Judith of Swabia. Almost immediately, Zbigniew was sent to Germany and placed in the Quedlinburg Abbey. With the idea of forcing his first born son to take holy vows, Władysław intended to deprive him of any chance of succession.

In 1090, Sieciech, with the help of Polish forces under his command, managed to gain control of Gdańsk Pomerania, albeit for a short time. Major towns were garrisoned by Polish troops; the rest were burned in order to thwart any future resistance. Several months later, however, a rebellion of native elites led to the restoration of the region's independence from Poland. Sieciech's tyrannical rule reflected negatively on Władysław, causing a massive political migration out of Poland. In 1093, Silesia rebelled, and the comes Magnus, with the assistance of the Bohemian and Polish knights, welcomed Zbigniew after he escaped from Germany; however, soon Sieciech captured the prince and imprisoned him. The increasing dissatisfaction in the country forced the release of Zbigniew in 1097. Immediately after this, Władysław (after an unsuccessful retaliatory expedition against Silesia and being forced to recognize Zbigniew as the legitimate heir) appointed his sons as commanders of the army, which was formed in order to recapture Gdańsk Pomerania.

Simultaneously, a great migration of Jews from Western Europe to Poland began circa 1096, around the time of the First Crusade. Władysław, a tolerant ruler, attracted the Jews to his domains and permitted them to settle throughout the entire country without restriction.

Soon, Zbigniew and Bolesław decided to join forces and demanded that the reins of government be handed over to them. Władysław agreed to divide the realm between the brothers, each to be granted his own province while he himself kept control of Mazovia and its capital at Płock. Władysław also retained control of the most important cities – i.e., Wrocław, Kraków and Sandomierz. Zbigniew's province encompassed Greater Poland including Gniezno, Kuyavia, Łęczyca and Sieradz. Bolesław's territory included Lesser Poland, Silesia and Lubusz Land. However, Sieciech, alarmed by the evident diminution of his power, began to intrigue against the brothers. Władysław decided to support him against his own sons. Defeated, and after the mediation of Martin, the Archbishop of Gniezno, the Duke was forced to confiscate Sieciech's properties and exile him in 1101.

== Erection of churches ==
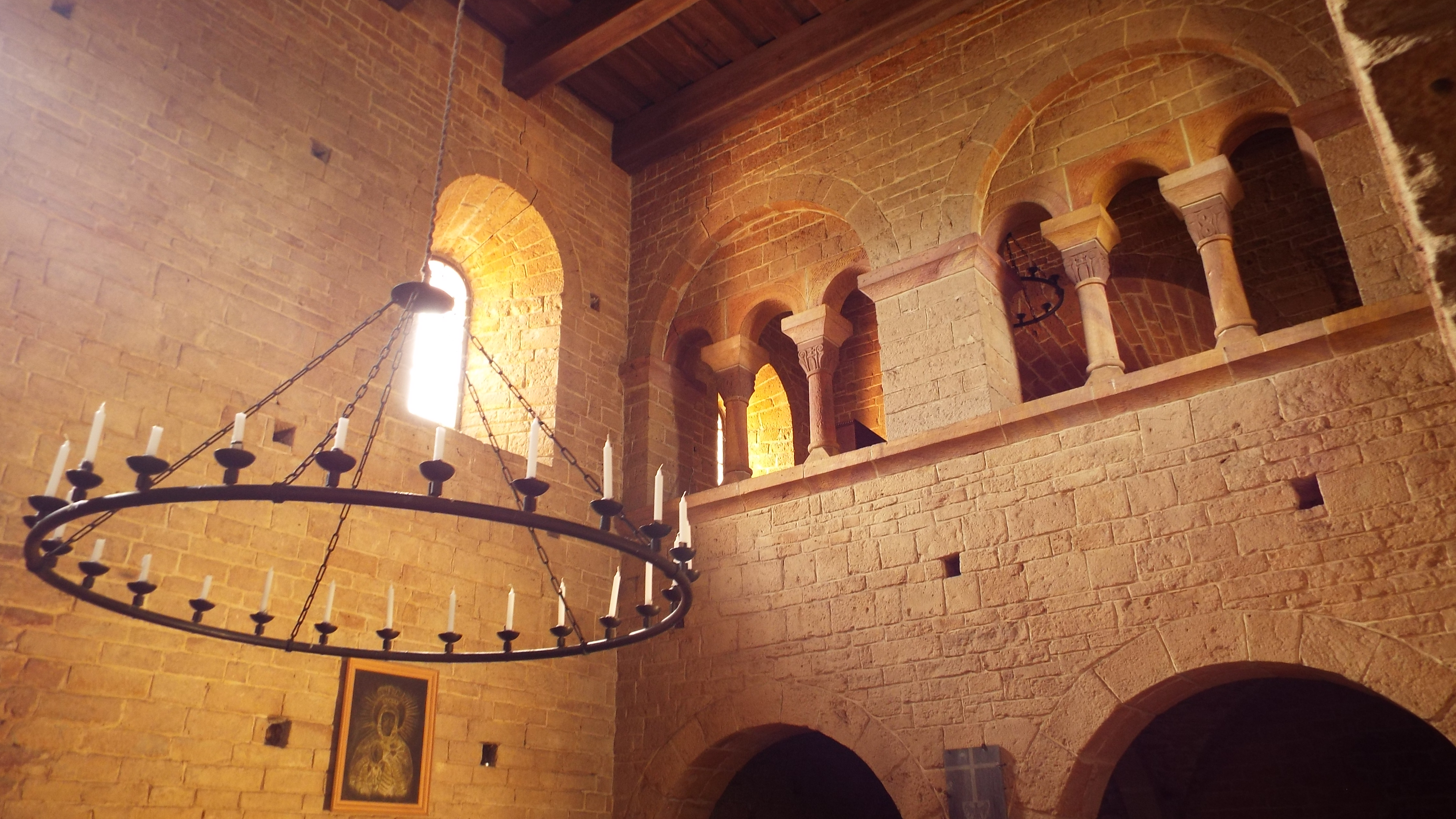
Romanesque interior of the Church of St. Giles at Inowłódz, in central Poland.

Władysław founded several churches in Poland. Most notably, he was the founder of the Romanesque Wawel Cathedral of which the Silver Bells Tower still remains standing. He was also very fond of Saint Giles (Polish: Idzi), to whom he founded no less than three churches: in Kraków, Inowłódz and Giebułtów. This is attributed to the fact that while his first wife was finally pregnant after six years of childless marriage, the Duke sent rich gifts to the Benedictine monastery of Saint Gilles in southern France, begging for a healthy child. When a son was born, Wladyslaw began building churches in his honor. According to legend, he also founded a church "on the sand" dedicated to the Virgin Mary, which was later granted to the Carmelites.

== Health ==
According to Gallus Anonymus, Władysław long suffered from a debilitating ailment that affected his legs. There is also a legend that states that in 1086, Władysław was affected by a terrible pox, with abscesses that affected his nose and face. According to the legend, the Holy Virgin appeared in the duke's dream and led him to find the cure in the sandy area outside the city. Once healed, Władysław founded a Church of the Holiest Virgin Mary "on the sand" in the spot where he found the cure.

Władysław died on 4 June 1102, without resolving the issue of succession, leaving his sons to struggle for supremacy. His body was interred in the Płock Cathedral. In the 1970s, his remains were exhumed and studied by scientists; it was determined that Władysław was afflicted by a form of ankylosis of the spine, near the sacroiliac joint, as well as pathologic changes in the knee (osteoarthritis) and excrescence on the right thigh, causing immense pain and restricted mobility.

== Marriages and issue ==
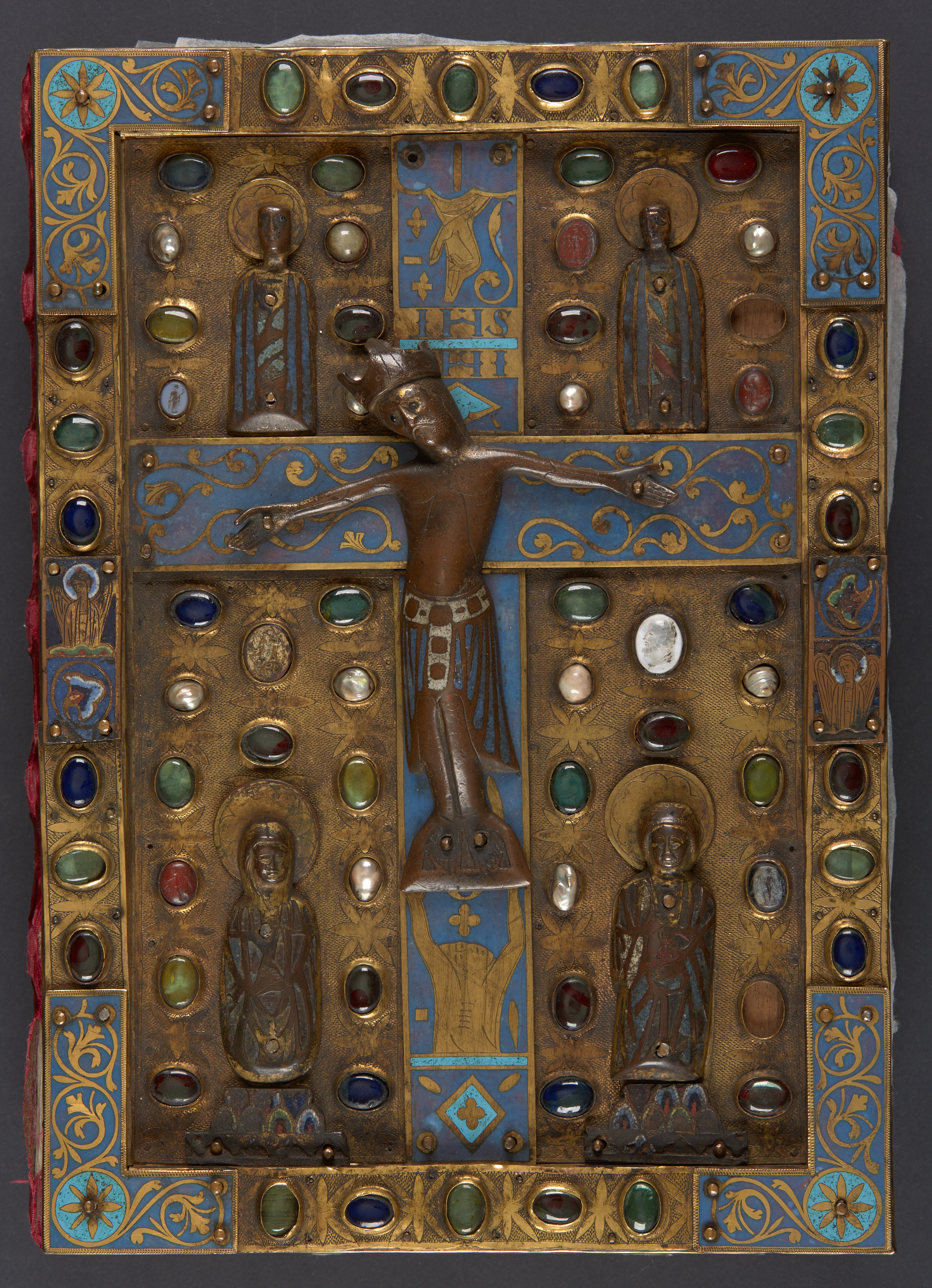
Codex aureus pultoviensis, an 11th-century codex which belonged to Władysław Herman's wife and consort, Judith. It is held at the Czartoryski Library in Kraków.

Before Władysław became duke of Poland, probably during the 1070s, he had a relationship with a Polish woman of uncertain name (possibly Przecława), and stated by Kronika Wielkopolska to come from Prawdzic clan. He entered a non-dynastic marriage with her performed according to slavic rites, and theorized by historians to be a love match, as Władysław was not expected to inherit power and thus was free from duty of political marriage; however, it has been also proposed that the Prince could have been coerced into this union by his brother, Duke and later King Boleslaus the Bold, who may have wished to weaken Władysław's and his potential offspring's claim to the throne. Władysław either widowed or dissolved the marriage at latest in 1080.

The union produced one known child:

1. Zbigniew (b. c. 1070/1073 – d. c. 1112/1114). Because of the pagan nature of his parents wedding, his legitimacy was disputed by some members of Catholic Church, though, as having been born by the customs once seen as legitimate, he was considered heir apparent by the Polish nobles; he was ultimately recognized as the rightful heir by Maur, the bishop of Kraków.

In 1080, Władysław married Judith (c. 1056–1086), daughter of Vratislaus II of Bohemia. They had a son, Bolesław Wrymouth (1086–1138). In 1089 Władysław married Judith (1054–1105), daughter of Emperor Henry III and widow of King Solomon of Hungary. Their daughters were:

1. Sophia (b. c. 1089 – d. bef. 12 May 1112), married before 1108 to Iaroslav Sviatopolkovich, (Note: Norman Davies states only a daughter of Wladyslaw married Iaroslav and gives no specific name.) Prince of Volhynia, son of Sviatopolk II of Kiev.
2. Agnes (b. c. 1090 – d. 29 December 1127), abbess of Quedlinburg (1110) and Gandersheim (1111);
3. Adelaide (b. c. 1091 – d. 25/26 March 1127), married before 1118 to Margrave Diepold III of Vohburg;
4. A daughter (b. c. 1092 – d. bef. 1111), married c. 1111 to a Polish lord.

== See also ==
- History of Poland (966–1385)

== Sources ==
- Davies, Norman (1982). God's Playground: A History of Poland. Vol. I: The Origins to 1795. Columbia University Press.

Władysław I Herman Piast Dynasty Born: c. 1044 Died: 4 June 1102
| Preceded by Bolesław II the Bold | Duke of Poland; 1079 – 1102 | Succeeded by Zbigniew and Bolesław III Wrymouth |
