= List of wars involving Poland =

This is a chronological list of wars in which Poland or its predecessor states, took an active part, extending from the reign of Mieszko I (960–992) to the present. This list does not include peacekeeping operations (such as UNPROFOR, UNTAES or UNMOP), humanitarian missions or training missions supported by the Polish Armed Forces.

The list gives the name, the date, the Polish allies and enemies, and the result of these conflicts following this legend:

Polish victory
Polish defeat
Another result
Internal conflict
Ongoing conflict

== Piast Poland (960–1138) ==
During the Middle Ages, Poland sought to incorporate other fellow West Slavic peoples under the rule of the Polan dukes, such as Mieszko I, Boleslaw I Chrobry and their descendants, and then defend the lands conquered in the west from the Holy Roman Empire. In the east and south it struggled with Ruthenia, Bohemia. In the north-east, it encountered intermittent Lithuanian and Prussian raids.

| Date | Conflict | Belligerents 1 | Belligerents 2 | Leaders | Events | Result |
|---|---|---|---|---|---|---|
| 963 | Gero's raid on Poland | Duchy of Poland | Saxon Eastern March | Mieszko I | | Defeat |
| 963– 967 | Polish-Veletian War | Duchy of Poland Duchy of Bohemia (967) | Veleti Wolinians (967) | Mieszko I | Battle of Mieszko I with Wichman | Victory |
| 972 | Battle of Cedynia | Duchy of Poland | Saxon Eastern March | Mieszko I; Prince Czcibor | | Victory |
| 979-980 | Otto II's raid on Poland | Duchy of Poland | Holy Roman Empire | Mieszko I | | Victory |
| 981 | Vladimir the Great's Polish Campaign | Duchy of Poland | Kievan Rus' | Mieszko I | | Defeat |
| 985–986 | Otto III's expedition against the Slavonians and Veleti | Holy Roman Empire Duchy of Poland | Slavonians (?) Veleti | | | Victory |
| 988– 990 | Polish-Bohemian War | Duchy of Poland Holy Roman Empire | Duchy of Bohemia | Mieszko I | | Victory |
| 989 | Polish invasion of Slavonians | Duchy of Poland | Slavonians of Pogorzelec–Brandebourg | | | Victory |
| 991 | Otto III's expedition against the Veleti | Holy Roman Empire Duchy of Poland | Veleti | Mieszko I | | Victory |
| 995 | Polabian expedition | Duchy of Poland Holy Roman Empire Duchy of Bohemia | Obotrites Veleti | Bolesław I | | Defeat |
| 1000 | Battle of Svolder | (Kingdom of Norway (872–1397)) Norway Supported by: Duchy of Poland | Denmark Sweden | Bolesław I | | Defeat |
| 1003– 1005 | German–Polish War | Duchy of Poland | Holy Roman Empire Duchy of Bohemia Veleti | Bolesław I | Battles of the German–Polish War (1003–1018) | Defeat |
| 1007–1013 | German–Polish War | Duchy of Poland | Holy Roman Empire | Bolesław I | Battles of the German–Polish War (1003–1018) | Victory |
| 1013 | Bolesław the Brave's expedition to Kievan Rus | Kingdom of Poland | Kievan Rus' | Bolesław I | | Victory: Release of Sviatopolk I |
| 1015–1018 | German–Polish War | Duchy of Poland: Moravians | Holy Roman Empire Duchy of Bohemia Margraviate of Austria Veleti | Bolesław I | Battles of the German–Polish War (1003–1018) | Victory |
| 1015–1016 | Cnut's invasion of England | Denmark Vikings Supported by: (Kingdom of Norway (872–1397)) Norway; Sweden; Duchy of Poland; Danish-allied English | Kingdom of England | Bolesław I | | Victory |
| 1017 | Yaroslav the Wise's raid of gord | Kingdom of Poland | Kievan Rus' | Bolesław I | | Victory |
| 1018 | Intervention in the Kievan succession crisis | Sviatopolk loyalists Duchy of Poland Kingdom of Hungary | Yaroslav the Wise loyalists | Bolesław I; Sviatopolk I | Battle of the River Bug | Victory |
| 1022 | Yaroslav the Wise's attack on Brest | Duchy of Poland | Kievan Rus' | Bolesław I | | Victory |
| 1028– 1031 | German–Polish War | Kingdom of Poland Kingdom of Hungary | Holy Roman Empire Duchy of Bohemia Kievan Rus' (Kingdom of Norway (872–1397)) Exiled Norwegians | Mieszko II | Siege of Bautzen; German-Bohemian-Ruthenian invasion of Poland (1030) | Defeat |
| 1038 | Bretislav I's raid on Poland | Kingdom of Poland | Duchy of Bohemia | | | Defeat |
| 1038–1047 | Miecław's Rebellion | Kingdom of Poland Kievan Rus' | Miecław's State Duchy of Eastern Pomerania Yotvingians | Casimir I; Yaroslav the Wise | Battle of Casimir I with Miecław | Victory |
| 1047 | Casimir I's raid on Silesia | Kingdom of Poland Kievan Rus' | Duchy of Bohemia | Casimir I | | Victory: Casimir I forced to pay tribute to the Czech duke as compensation |
| 1050 | Casimir I's raid on Silesia | Kingdom of Poland | Duchy of Bohemia | Casimir I | | Victory |
| 1060 | Siege of Hradec nad Moravicí | Kingdom of Poland | Duchy of Bohemia | Bolesław II | | Defeat |
| 1060 | Hungarian succession crisis | Kingdom of Poland Kingdom of Hungary (Bela's supporters) | Kingdom of Hungary (Andrew's supporters) Holy Roman Empire Duchy of Bohemia | Bolesław II | | Victory |
| 1069–1071 | Expedition to Kiev | Kingdom of Poland | Kievan Rus' Pechenegs Varangians | Bolesław II; Wszebor; Iziaslav I; Sviatopolk II | | Victory |
| 1070–1071 | Vratislaus II's invasion of Poland | Kingdom of Poland | Duchy of Bohemia | Bolesław II | | Inconclusive: Peace enforced by Holy Roman Emperor Henry IV |
| 1072 | Bolesław II's attack on Bohemia | Kingdom of Poland | Duchy of Bohemia | Bolesław II | | Victory: Poland stops paying tribute to Bohemia |
| 1074 | Hungarian succession crisis | Kingdom of Poland Kingdom of Hungary under Géza | Kingdom of Hungary under Solomon | Bolesław II; Géza I | | Victory |
| 1076 | Bolesław II's attack on Bohemia | Kingdom of Poland Kievan Rus' | Duchy of Bohemia | Bolesław II; Sviatoslav II | | Victory: Devastation of Czech borderlands |
| 1077 | Bolesław II the Bold's Expedition to Kiev | Kingdom of Poland | Kievan Rus' | Bolesław II | | Victory: Iziaslav I put on the throne |
| 1077 | Hungarian succession crisis | Kingdom of Poland Kingdom of Hungary (Ladislaus' supporters) | Kingdom of Hungary (Andrew's supporters) Holy Roman Empire | Bolesław II | | Victory: Ladislaus I put on the throne |
| 1090–1091 | Polish expedition to Pomerania | Kingdom of Poland | Pomeranians | Władysław I; Sieciech | | Defeat |
| 1092 | Vasilko Rostislavich's raid on Poland | Kingdom of Poland | Kievan Rus' | | | Defeat |
| 1092 | Sieciech's expedition to Moravia | Kingdom of Poland | Duchy of Bohemia | Sieciech | | Victory |
| 1093– 1100 | Civil War in Poland | Władysław I Herman Sieciech | Zbigniew of Poland Bolesław III Wrymouth | Sieciech; Władysław I; Zbigniew; Bolesław III | Battle of Gopło | Internal conflict: Bolesław receives the whole of the south, including Silesia and a part of Lesser Poland; Zbigniew receives central Greater Poland and Kuyavia; Władysław continues to hold Masovia |
| 1093 | Bretislaus II raid into Silesia | Kingdom of Poland | Duchy of Bohemia | Władysław I Herman | | Defeat: Restoration of tribute for Silesia; Bohemian leader agrees to provide the Polish prince with support in internal conflicts |
| 1096 | Bretislaus II raid into Silesia | Kingdom of Poland | Duchy of Bohemia | Władysław I Herman | | Defeat: Bretislaus II build Kamienec castle on newly captured territory |
| 1099 | Pomeranian expedition to Santok | Kingdom of Poland | Western Pomerania | Bolesław III; Władysław I; Zbigniew | | Victory |
| 1101 | Cuman raid on Poland | Kingdom of Poland | Cumania | Bolesław III | | Victory |
| 1102–1109 | Bolesław III's conquest of Pomerania | Kingdom of Poland | Pomeranians | Bolesław III; Skarbimir | Raid on Bialogród (1102); Raid on Kolobrzeg (1103); Raid on Brytyń (1105); Raid on Kolobrzeg (1107); Raid on Bialogród (1107); Battle of Ujście (1108); Battle of Czarnków (1108); Battle of Wieleń (1108–1109); Battle of Nakło | Victory |
| 1103– 1108 | Civil War in Poland | Bolesław III Wrymouth Kingdom of Hungary Kievan Rus' | Zbigniew of Poland Duchy of Bohemia | Bolesław III | | Internal conflict: Zbigniew expelled from Poland |
| 1103 | Bolesław III's war with Bohemia | Kingdom of Poland | Duchy of Bohemia | Bolesław III | Attack on Moravia; Attack on Silesia | Inconclusive: Diplomatic success; Payment from the Polish side; Alliance between Bořivoj II and Svatopluk of Oloumouc is broken |
| 1108 | Battle of Racibórz | Kingdom of Poland | Duchy of Bohemia | Bolesław III | | Victory |
| 1108 | Bolesław III's expedition to Bohemia | Kingdom of Poland | Duchy of Bohemia | Bolesław III; Bořivoj II | | Victory |
| 1109 | Henry V's expedition to Poland | Kingdom of Poland | Holy Roman Empire Duchy of Bohemia | Bolesław III | Siege of Głogów; Battle of Nakło; Battle of Hundsfeld | Victory |
| 1110 | Raid of Zbigniew and Bohemia into Silesia | Kingdom of Poland | Duchy of Bohemia Zbigniew of Poland | Bolesław III | | Victory |
| 1110 | Bolesław III's expedition to Bohemia | Kingdom of Poland | Duchy of Bohemia | Bolesław III; Soběslaus I | Battle of Trutina | Inconclusive: Military success; Failure to put Soběslav I on the throne |
| 1112–1113 | Bolesław III's conquest of Pomerania | Kingdom of Poland | Pomeranians | Bolesław III | | Victory: Capture of Wyszogród and Nakło |
| 1114 | Capture of Kladsko | Kingdom of Poland | Duchy of Bohemia | Bolesław III; Soběslaus I | | Victory |
| 1114–1119 | Bolesław III's conquest of Pomerania | Kingdom of Poland | Pomeranians | Bolesław III | Expedition to Prussia (1114); Expedition against Pomerania (1116); Expedition against Pomerania (1119) | Victory: Incorporation of Pomerania into Poland |
| 1117 | Skarbimir's rebellion | Kingdom of Poland | Rebels under Skarbimir | Bolesław III | | Victory |
| 1120–1125 | Polish–Ruthenian War | Kingdom of Poland | Kievan Rus' | Bolesław III | Kievan–Cuman raid on Poland; Siege of Volodymyr; Battle of Wilichów | Victory |
| 1121 | Battle of Niekładź | Kingdom of Poland | Pomeranians | Bolesław III | | Victory |
| 1124–1125 | Otto of Bamberg's expedition to Pomerania | Kingdom of Poland Otto's forces | Pomeranians | Bolesław III | | Victory |
| 1127 | Warcisław I's expedition to Masovia | Kingdom of Poland | Pomeranians | Bolesław III | | Defeat: Capture and plunder of Płock |
| 1128 | Otto of Bamberg's expedition to Pomerania | Kingdom of Poland Otto's forces | Pomeranians | Bolesław III | | Victory |
| 1129 | Intervention in Szczecin Pomerania | Kingdom of Poland Denmark | Pomeranians | Bolesław III | Siege of Wolin | Victory: Bolesław regained control over Western Pomerania |
| 1132 | Bolesław III's expedition to Hungary | Duchy of Poland Kievan Rus Hungarian Opposition | Kingdom of Hungary Duchy of Bohemia Duchy of Austria Holy Roman Empire | Bolesław III; Vladimir II; Boris Kalamanos | Battle of Sajó River | Defeat |
| 1132-1135 | Soběslaus I raids into Silesia | Duchy of Poland | Duchy of Bohemia | Bolesław III | Raid into Silesia (1132); Four raids into Kozlé (1133); Two raids into Silesia (1134) | Defeat |
| 1135 | Vladimirko Volodarovich's raid on Poland | Kingdom of Poland | Kievan Rus' | | | Defeat |
| 1136 | Bolesław III Wrymouth's raid on Rus' | Kingdom of Poland | Kievan Rus' | | | Victory |

== Feudal fragmentation (1138–1320) ==
In 1138, after the death of Bolesław III Wrymouth, Poland was divided into districts ruled by local princes. This began a period of feudal fragmentation that lasted for more than 187 years during which Poland was severely weakened due to incessant internal conflicts. The feudal fragmentation ended in 1320 during the reign of Władyslaw I Lokietek.

| Date | Conflict | Belligerents 1 | Belligerents 2 | Leaders | Events | Result |
|---|---|---|---|---|---|---|
| 1142–1143 | Vsevolod II's raid on Poland | Kingdom of Poland | Kievan Rus' | | | Defeat |
| 1147 | Wendish Crusade | Crusaders including: Kingdom of Poland | Wends | | | Victory |
| 1154– 1155 | Henry of Sandomir's crusade to Palestine | Polish knights | Saracen | Henry I | | Victory |
| 1157 | Frederick I's expedition to Głogów | Kingdom of Poland Cumania Old Prussians | Holy Roman Empire Duchy of Bohemia | Bolesław IV | | Defeat |
| 1163 | Polish raid on Rus' | Kingdom of Poland | Kievan Rus' | | | Victory |
| 1182– 1183 | War for Brest | Kingdom of Poland Ruthenian rebels | Kievan Rus' | Casimir II; Mikołaj Gryfita | | Victory |
| 1190 | Expedition for Duke Vladimir | Kingdom of Poland | Unknown | | | Victory |
| 1192 | Battle of Drohiczyn | Kingdom of Poland | Yatvingians Kievan Rus' Cumanians Polish rebels | Casimir II | | Victory |
| 1199 | Leszek the White's expedition to Halych | Duchy of Sandomierz Duchy of Kraków | Kingdom of Galicia–Volhynia | Leszek the White | | Victory |
| 1205 | Battle of Zawichost | Duchy of Sandomierz Duchy of Masovia House of Welf | Kingdom of Galicia–Volhynia Hohenstaufen | Leszek the White; Konrad I | | Victory |
| 1206 | Leszek the White's expedition to Volodymyr | Duchy of Sandomierz Duchy of Kraków | Kingdom of Galicia–Volhynia | Leszek the White | | Victory |
| 1207 | Leszek the White's expedition to Volodymyr | Duchy of Sandomierz Duchy of Kraków | Kingdom of Galicia–Volhynia | Leszek the White | | Victory |
| 1209–1211 | Battle of Lubusz | Duchy of Silesia Duchy of Greater Poland | Margraviate of Brandenburg | Henry the Bearded; Władysław III | | Victory |
| 1213–1214 | Leszek the White's Galician Campaign | Duchy of Sandomierz Duchy of Kraków | Kingdom of Galicia–Volhynia | Leszek the White | | Victory |
| 1218 | Leszek the White's expedition to Ruthenia | Duchy of Sandomierz Duchy of Kraków | Kingdom of Galicia–Volhynia | Leszek the White | | Defeat |
| 1219–1221 | Polish–Hungarian–Ruthenian War | Kingdom of Poland Kingdom of Hungary | Kingdom of Galicia–Volhynia | | | Defeat |
| 1224 | War between Leszek the White and Mstislav Mstislavich | Duchy of Sandomierz Duchy of Kraków | Kingdom of Galicia–Volhynia | Leszek the White | | Victory |
| 1225–1229 | Second War for Lubusz | Kingdom of Poland | Margraviate of Brandenburg | | | Victory |
| 1227 | Battle of Zvenigorod | Kingdom of Poland Kingdom of Hungary | Kingdom of Galicia–Volhynia | | | Defeat |
| 1229 | Daniel expedition to Kalisz | Duchy of Sandomierz Duchy of Kraków | Kingdom of Galicia–Volhynia | | | Defeat |
| 1234 | Polish-Teutonic crusade on Old Prussians | Local dukes Teutonic Knights | Old Prussians | Konrad I; Henry I; Władysław Odonic; Swietopelk II; Sambor II | Battle of Reisen | Victory |
| 1236–1237 | Mikhail's Volyn campaign | Principality of Volhynia Cumans Duchy of Kraków Duchy of Masovia | Kingdom of Galicia–Volhynia | Konrad I | | Defeat |
| 1238–1240 | Battle of Lubusz | Duchy of Silesia | Margraviate of Brandenburg | Henry II | | Victory |
| 1241 | First Mongol Invasion of Poland | Local dukes Military orders | Mongol Empire | Henry II; Pakosław of Sandomierz; Włodzimierz of Cracow; Klemens of Brzeźnica; Klement of Ruszcza; Mieszko II; Władysław I; Sulisław of Kraków; Szczepan of Wierzbna | Battles of the first Mongol invasion of Poland | Defeat |
| 1259– 1260 | Second Mongol Invasion of Poland | Bolesław V the Chaste | Mongol Empire | Bolesław V | Sack of Sandomierz | Defeat |
| 1260 | Battle of Kressenbrunn | Kingdom of Bohemia Duchy of Silesia | Kingdom of Hungary Kingdom of Croatia Kingdom of Poland Kingdom of Galicia–Volhynia | Bolesław V | | Defeat |
| 1264 | Battle of Brańsk | Duchy of Sandomierz Duchy of Kraków | Kingdom of Galicia–Volhynia Yotvingians | Boleslaw V | | Victory |
| 1265–1278 | Polish–Brandenburgian War | Kingdom of Poland | Margraviate of Brandenburg | | | Victory |
| 1269–1272 | Civil war in Pomerelia | Duchy of Świecie Duchy of Pomerelia Duchy of Greater Poland | Duchy of Gdańsk Duchy of Lubiszewo Duchy of Inowrocław State of the Teutonic Order Margraviate of Brandenburg | Bolesław the Pious; Wartislaw II; Sambor II; Ziemomysł of Kuyavia | | Internal conflict |
| 1273– 1274 | Civil War in Poland | Bolesław V the Chaste | Vladislaus I of Opole | Bolesłav V; Vladislaus I | Battle of Bogucin | Internal conflict |
| 1277 | Silesian Civil War | Henry V of Legnica Bolesław II the Horned | Przemysł II Henry III of Głogów | Henry V; Bolesław II; Przemysł II; Henry III | Battle of Stolec | Internal conflict |
| 1278 | Battle of Myślibórz | Duchy of Greater Poland Duchy of Pomerelia | Margraviate of Brandenburg | Bolesław the Pious | | Victory |
| 1279 | Ruthenian raid on Poland | Kingdom of Poland | Kingdom of Galicia–Volhynia | | | Defeat |
| 1280 | Kraków campaign of Leo I of Galicia | Kingdom of Poland | Kingdom of Galicia–Volhynia | Leszek II | Battle of Goźlice | Victory |
| 1287– 1288 | Third Mongol Invasion of Poland | Kingdom of Poland Kingdom of Hungary | Mongol Empire | Leszek II | Battle of Łagów; Battle of Dunajec; Battle of Stary Sącz | Victory |
| 1288– 1290 | War for Lesser Poland | Władysław I the Elbow-high Casimir II of Łęczyca Bolesław II of Masovia Konrad II of Masovia | Henry III of Głogów Przemko of Ścinawa Bolko I of Opole | Władysław I; Casimir II; Bolesław II; Konrad II; Henry III; Bolko I | Battle of Siewierz | Internal conflict |
| 1291-1292 | Wenceslaus II's campaign to Lesser Poland | Duchy of Sandomierz | Kingdom of Bohemia | Władysław I | | Defeat |
| 1300 | Wenceslaus II's expedition to Poland | Duchy of Sieradz Duchy of Brześć Kujawski Duchy of Łęczyca Duchy of Greater Poland Duchy of Eastern Pomerania | Kingdom of Bohemia | Władysław I | | Defeat |
| 1305–1312 | Polish–Bohemian War | Kingdom of Poland | Kingdom of Bohemia | Władysław I | | Victory |
| 1308 | Siege of Gdańsk | Kingdom of Poland Teutonic Order | Margraviate of Brandenburg Swienca family Diocese of Kamien Pomorski Diocese of Lebus | | | Victory |
| 1308 | Teutonic takeover of Danzig | Kingdom of Poland | Teutonic Knights | Władysław I | | Defeat |
| 1311–1312 | Mayor Albert's Rebellion | Kingdom of Poland | Burghers of Kraków | Władysław I | | Victory |

== Reunited Kingdom of Poland (1320–1385) ==
In 1320, after the end of the feudal fragmentation, during the reign of Władyslaw I Łokietek and his son Casimir III the Great, Poland experienced a period of strong economic development, this period also increased migration to Poland especially of Germans and Jews. The period ended after the death of Casimir the Great and the assumption of the Polish throne by Louis I.

| Date | Conflict | Belligerents 1 | Belligerents 2 | Leaders | Events | Result |
|---|---|---|---|---|---|---|
| 1323 | Polish–Hungarian expedition to Ruthenia | Kingdom of Poland Kingdom of Hungary | Kingdom of Galicia–Volhynia | | | Victory |
| 1326 | Raid on Brandenburg | Kingdom of Poland Grand Duchy of Lithuania | Margraviate of Brandenburg | Władysław I | | Victory |
| 1326– 1332 | Polish-Teutonic War | Kingdom of Poland Grand Duchy of Lithuania Kingdom of Hungary Duchy of Płock | Teutonic Knights Kingdom of Bohemia Duchy of Masovia | Władysław I; Casimir III; Wincenty of Szamotuły; Wenceslaus of Płock | Battle of Kowal; Siege of Płock; Battle of Płowce; Defense of Łuk Warty; Siege of Kalisz; Battle of Konin; Battle of Pyzdry; Siege of Brześć Kujawski | Indecisive |
| 1340– 1392 | Galicia-Volhynia Wars | Kingdom of Poland Duchy of Masovia Kingdom of Hungary | Kingdom of Galicia–Volhynia Grand Duchy of Lithuania Crimean Khanate | Casimir III; Siemowit III | Battle of the Vistula; Battle of Lublin; Battle of Żukowo; Lithuanian raid on Mazovia; Lithuanian raid on Poland | Victory |
| 1345– 1348 | Polish-Bohemian War | Kingdom of Poland Grand Duchy of Lithuania Kingdom of Hungary | Kingdom of Bohemia | Casimir III | Siege of Żory; Siege of Kraków; Battle of Lelów; Battle of Pogoń | Indecisive: Treaty of Namslau |
| 1352–1358 | Maciek Borkowicz's Confederation | Kingdom of Poland | Maciek Borkowicz's Confederation Families from Greater Poland and Brandenburg | | | Victory |
| 1368 | Battle of Codrii Plonini | Kingdom of Poland; Moldavian opposition | Moldavia | Casimir III the Great | | Defeat |
| 1375– 1377 | Hungarian-Ottoman War | Kingdom of Poland Kingdom of Hungary | Ottoman Empire | Louis I | | Victory |
| 1381– 1385 | Greater Poland Civil War | Grzymała | Nałęcz | | | Internal conflict |

== Jagiellon Poland (1385–1569) ==
For much of its early history as a Christian state, Poland had to contend with Pomeranians, Prussians, Lithuanians and other Baltic peoples in continuous border wars without clear results or end in sight. After the Teutonic Order conquered and assimilated the Prussians, it began incursions into both Polish and Lithuanian territories. This represented a far greater threat to both Poland and Lithuania, and the two countries united in a defensive alliance by the crowning of the Lithuanian Duke Jogaila as King of Poland (as Władysław II) which led to a major confrontation at the Battle of Grunwald in 1410 and subsequent wars until 1525, when the Order became a vassal to the Polish Crown.

| Date | Conflict | Belligerents 1 | Belligerents 2 | Leaders | Events | Result |
|---|---|---|---|---|---|---|
| 1387 | Polish conquest of Moldavia | Kingdom of Poland | Principality of Moldavia | Jadwiga; Władysław II | | Victory |
| 1389– 1392 | Lithuanian Civil War | Grand Duchy of Lithuania Kingdom of Poland | Samogitia Teutonic Knights Rus' principalities | Władysław II | | Indecisive |
| 1389–1396 | Hungarian–Ottoman War | Kingdom of Hungary Kingdom of Poland Others | Ottoman Empire Moravian Serbia | | Battle of Nicopolis | Defeat |
| 1399 | Battle of the Vorskla River | Grand Duchy of Lithuania Kingdom of Poland Others | Golden Horde | Spytko II | | Defeat |
| 1409– 1411 | Polish-Lithuanian-Teutonic War | Kingdom of Poland Grand Duchy of Lithuania (Moldavia) Moldavia Tatars from Golden Horde Bohemians Moravians Silesians Wallachians | Teutonic Knights Czech mercenaries Silesian mercenaries | Władysław II; Janusz I; Siemowit IV; Siemowit V; Bogislav VIII | Battle of Grunwald; Siege of Marienburg; Battle of Koronowo | Victory |
| 1414 | Hunger War | Kingdom of Poland Grand Duchy of Lithuania | Teutonic Knights | Władysław II | | Victory |
| 1415– 1419 | Hungarian–Ottoman War | Kingdom of Hungary Kingdom of Poland | Ottoman Empire | | | Indecisive |
| 1419 | Retreat Expedition | Kingdom of Poland | Teutonic Knights | Władysław II | | Initial Polish victory Expedition cancelled afterwards |
| 1422 | Golub War | Kingdom of Poland Grand Duchy of Lithuania Principality of Moldavia | Teutonic Knights | Władysław II | | Victory |
| 1425–1427 | Uckermark War | Pomerania-Stettin Pomerania-Wolgast Pomerania-Stolp Pomerania-Stargard Mecklenburg-Stargard Kingdom of Poland Werle (1425–1426) | Margraviate of Brandenburg | Jan of Czarnków | | Victory |
| 1431 | Alexander the Good's expedition to Podolia | Kingdom of Poland | Principality of Moldavia | | | Victory |
| 1431– 1435 | Polish-Teutonic War | Hussites Kingdom of Poland Grand Duchy of Lithuania (Žygimantas Kęstutaitis) | Teutonic Knights Grand Duchy of Lithuania(Švitrigaila) | Jan Mężyk; Feodor Ostrogski | Battle of Dąbki | Victory |
| 1432– 1438 | Lithuanian Civil War | Grand Duchy of Lithuania (pro-Roman Catholic) Kingdom of Poland Hussites | Grand Duchy of Lithuania (pro-Eastern Orthodox) Teutonic Knights Livonian Order Golden Horde Principality of Moldavia | Jakub Kobylański | Battle of Kopystryń; Battle of Wiłkomierz | Victory |
| 1438 | Invasion of Silesia | Kingdom of Poland | Hussites | | | Defeat |
| 1439 | Spytko III's Rebellion | Kingdom of Poland | Polish Hussites | Zbigniew Oleśnicki | | Victory |
| 1443–1444 | Crusade of Varna | Kingdom of Poland Kingdom of Hungary Others | Ottoman Empire | Władysław III | Battles of the Crusade of Varna | Defeat |
| 1450 | Fight for throne of Moldova | Kingdom of Poland Moldavian opposition | Principality of Moldavia | Alexăndrel of Moldavia; Piotr Odrowąż | Battle of Krasnem | Defeat |
| 1454– 1466 | Thirteen Years' War | Prussian Confederation Kingdom of Poland | Teutonic Knights Livonian Brothers of the Sword Kingdom of Denmark | Piotr Dunin; Jan Bażyński; Casimir IV | Siege of Malbork; Battle of Chojnice; Battle of Ryn; Battle of Eylau; Battle of Bornholm; Siege of Marienburg; Battle of Pruszcz Gdański; Battle of Świecino; Battle of Vistula Lagoon | Victory |
| 1467– 1479 | War of the Priests | Kingdom of Poland | Nicolaus von Tüngen Teutonic Knights | Piotr Dunin; Casimir IV | | Victory |
| 1475 | Battle of Vaslui | Moldavia Kingdom of Poland Kingdom of Hungary | Ottoman Empire | | | Victory |
| 1476–1482 | War of the Głogów Succession | Kingdom of Poland | Kingdom of Bohemia | | | Victory |
| 1490–1492 | Muha Rebellion | Kingdom of Poland | Muha's army Moldavia (1490) | | | Defeat |
| 1485– 1503 | Polish-Ottoman War | Kingdom of Poland Grand Duchy of Lithuania | Ottoman Empire Principality of Moldavia Crimean Khanate | Casimir IV; John I; Stanisław Chodecki | Battle of Cătlăbuga; Battle of Kopystrzyń; Battle of Zasław; Battle of the Cosmin Forest | Defeat |
| 1491 | John I Albert's Expedition to Hungary | Kingdom of Poland | Kingdom of Hungary Kingdom of Bohemia | John I Albert | Battle of Kassa (1491) | Defeat |
| 1500– 1503 | Second Muscovite-Lithuanian War | Kingdom of Poland Grand Duchy of Lithuania | Grand Duchy of Moscow | Stanisław Kiszka; Alexander Jagiellon | Battle of Vedrosha; Battle of the Siritsa River; Battle of Mstislavl; Siege of Smolensk | Defeat |
| 1502– 1510 | Polish-Moldavian War | Kingdom of Poland | Principality of Moldavia Ottoman Empire | Mikołaj Kamieniecki; Alexander Jagiellon | Battle of Cernăuți; Battle of Khotyn | Victory |
| 1507–1508 | Lithuanian-Muscovite War | Grand Duchy of Lithuania Kingdom of Poland | Grand Duchy of Moscow | Sigismund I the Old | Battle of Orsha; Glinski rebellion | Indecisive |
| 1512– 1522 | Muscovite-Lithuanian War | Kingdom of Poland Grand Duchy of Lithuania | Grand Duchy of Moscow | Sigismund I; Jerzy Radziwiłł | Battle of Orsha; Siege of Smolensk; Siege of Opochka; Siege of Polotsk | Defeat |
| 1519– 1521 | Polish-Teutonic War | Kingdom of Poland | Teutonic Knights | Sigismund I; Mikołaj Firlej; Nicolaus Copernicus | | Victory |
| 1521–1526 | Hungarian–Ottoman War | Kingdom of Hungary Kingdom of Poland Others | Ottoman Empire | | Siege of Belgrade; Siege of Šabac; Battle of Mohács | Defeat |
| 1524 | Turko–Tatar raid on Poland | Kingdom of Poland | Ottoman Empire Crimean Khanate | | | Victory |
| 1530– 1538 | Polish-Moldavian War | Kingdom of Poland | Principality of Moldavia | Jan Tarnowski; Mikołaj Sieniawski | Battle of Gwoździec; Battle of Obertyn; Battle of Seret | Victory |
| 1534– 1537 | Lithuanian–Muscovite War | Kingdom of Poland Grand Duchy of Lithuania | Grand Duchy of Moscow | Sigismund I | Siege of Starodub | Indecisive |
| 1537 | Chicken War | Kingdom of Poland | Nobility | Sigismund I | | Internal conflict |
| 1550 | Moldavian expedition of Bar | Kingdom of Poland | Principality of Moldavia | Bernard Pretwicz | Attack on Bar | Victory |
| 1551 | Sieniawski's intervention in Moldavia | Kingdom of Poland Moldavian opposition | Principality of Moldavia | Jan Mielecki; Mikołaj Sieniawski | | Defeat |
| 1552 | Sieniawski's intervention in Moldavia | Kingdom of Poland Moldavian opposition | Principality of Moldavia | Mikołaj Sieniawski; Maciej Włodek | | Victory |
| 1561 | Battle of Verbia | Rebel forces Kingdom of Poland Others | Principality of Moldavia Ottoman Empire Principality of Wallachia | Peter Soldicki | | Victory |
| 1561– 1570 | Russo-Lithuanian War | Livonian Confederation Kingdom of Poland Denmark–Norway Swedish Empire | Tsardom of Russia Kingdom of Livonia | Sigismund II; Stephen Bathory | Battle of Nevel; Battle of Ula; Battles of Wenden; Siege of Polotsk; Second Battle of Ula | Defeat |
| 1563 | Moldavian campaign of Dmytro Vyshnevetsky | Kingdom of Poland; Zaporozhian Cossacks | Moldavia; Ottoman Empire | | | Defeat |
| 1563– 1568 | Polish–Swedish War | Kingdom of Poland Grand Duchy of Lithuania Denmark–Norway Free City of Lübeck | Kingdom of Sweden | Sigismund II | | Defeat |

== Polish–Lithuanian Commonwealth (1569–1795) ==
The 17th century saw fierce rivalry between the then major Eastern European powers – Sweden, the Polish–Lithuanian Commonwealth and the Ottoman Empire. At its heyday, the Commonwealth comprised the territories of present-day Poland, and large parts of Ukraine, Belarus, Lithuania, Latvia, Estonia, and Russia, and represented a major European power. However, by the end of the 18th century a series of internal conflicts and wars with foreign enemies led to the dissolution of the Polish–Lithuanian Commonwealth and the partitioning of most of its dependent territories among other European powers.

During the 18th century, European powers (most frequently consisting of Russia, Sweden, Prussia and Saxony) fought several wars for the control of the territories of the former Polish–Lithuanian Commonwealth. At the end of the 18th century, some Poles attempted to defend Poland from growing foreign influence in the country's internal affairs. These late attempts to preserve independence eventually failed, ultimately ending in Poland's partition and the final dissolution of the remains of the Polish–Lithuanian Commonwealth.

| Date | Conflict | Belligerents 1 | Belligerents 2 | Leaders | Events | Result |
|---|---|---|---|---|---|---|
| 1575–1577 | Danzig rebellion | Polish–Lithuanian Commonwealth | City of Gdańsk | Stephen Báthory; Jan Zborowski | | Victory |
| 1577– 1583 | Livonian campaign of Stephen Báthory | Polish–Lithuanian Commonwealth Principality of Transylvania | Tsardom of Russia | Stephen Bathory; Jan Zamoyski; Andrzej Sapieha; Mikołaj Mielecki; Mikołaj Radziwiłł; Krzysztof Radziwiłł | Events during the Livonian campaign of Stephen Báthory | Victory |
| 1587– 1588 | War of the Polish Succession | Polish–Lithuanian Commonwealth | Archduchy of Austria | Jan Zamoyski; Sigismund III | Siege of Kraków; Battle of Byczyna | Victory |
| 1591 | Kosiński Uprising | Polish–Lithuanian Commonwealth | Zaporozhian Cossacks | | Battle of Piatka | Victory |
| 1593–1606 | Long Turkish War | Habsburg monarchy Polish–Lithuanian Commonwealth Kingdom of Hungary Others | Ottoman Empire | | Battle of Keresztes; Battle of Mirăslău | Indecisive |
| 1594-1596 | Nalyvaiko Uprising | Polish–Lithuanian Commonwealth | Zaporozhian Cossacks | | Battle of Lubny | Victory |
| 1595 | Expedition to Moldavia | Polish–Lithuanian Commonwealth | Principality of Moldavia Ottoman Empire Crimean Khanate | Jan Zamoyski | Battle of Cecora; Battle of Suceava | Victory |
| 1598– 1599 | War against Sigismund | Polish–Lithuanian Commonwealth | (Sweden) Swedish Empire | Sigismund III | Battle of Stegeborg; Battle of Stångebro | Defeat |
| 1600– 1611 | Polish-Swedish War | Polish–Lithuanian Commonwealth | (Sweden) Swedish Empire | Sigismund III; Jan Chodkiewicz; Jan Zamoyski; Stanisław Żółkiewski; Krzysztof Radziwiłł; Jürgen von Farensbach | Battle of Karksi; Battle of Wenden; Battle of Kokenhausen; Siege of Wolmar; Siege of Fellin; Battle of Reval; Siege of Weissenstein; Battle of Rakvere; Battle of Weissenstein; Battle of Kircholm; Capture of Daugavgrīva; Siege of Pärnu; Battle of Salis; Battle of Daugavgrīva | Disputed |
| 1605 | 1st Dimitriad | False Dmitry I Polish–Lithuanian Commonwealth | Tsardom of Russia | | | Victory |
| 1606 | Moscow uprising | False Dmitry I Polish–Lithuanian Commonwealth | Tsardom of Russia | | | Defeat |
| 1606–1607 | Zebrzydowski's rebellion | Polish–Lithuanian Commonwealth | Polish nobles under Zebrzydowski | | | Victory |
| 1607 | Stefan Potocki's expedition to Moldavia | Polish–Lithuanian Commonwealth | Principality of Moldavia Crimean Khanate | | | Victory |
| 1607–1609 | 2nd Dimitriad | False Dmitry II Polish–Lithuanian Commonwealth | Tsardom of Russia | | | Defeat |
| 1609– 1618 | Polish-Muscovite War | Polish–Lithuanian Commonwealth False Dmitry I | Tsardom of Russia Don Cossacks (Sweden) Swedish Empire | Sigismund III; Władysław IV; Jan Chodkiewicz; Stanisław Żółkiewski; False Dmitry I; False Dmitry II; Aleksander Lisowski; Jan Sapieha; Lew Sapieha; Aleksander Gosiewski; Petro Konashevych-Sahaidachny | Battle of Novhorod-Siverskyi; Battle of Dobrynichi; Siege of Kromy; Battle of Kozelsk; Battle of Zaraysk; Battle of Bolkhov; Battle of Medvezhiy Brod; Siege of Troitsky monastery; De la Gardie campaign; Siege of Smolensk; Tsaryovo-Zaymishche; Battle of Klushino; Battle of Moscow; Siege of Smolensk; Battle of Mozhaysk; Siege of Moscow; Prince Władysław's March on Moscow | Victory |
| 1612 | Battle of Cornul lui Sas | Polish–Lithuanian Commonwealth | Principality of Moldavia Ottoman Empire Crimean Khanate | Stefan Potocki; Stanisław Żółkiewski | | Defeat |
| 1615–1616 | Expedition to Moldavia | Polish–Lithuanian Commonwealth Moldavian opposition | Principality of Moldavia Ottoman Empire Crimean Khanate Principality of Wallachia | Samuel Korecki; Michał Wiśniowiecki | Battle of Iași; Battle of Cornul lui Sas | Defeat |
| 1617– 1618 | Polish-Swedish War | Polish–Lithuanian Commonwealth | (Sweden) Swedish Empire | Krzysztof Radziwiłł | | Defeat |
| 1619 | Lisowczyk's intervention in the Thirty Years' War | Polish–Lithuanian Commonwealth | Principality of Transylvania | | Battle of Humenné | Victory |
| 1620– 1621 | Polish-Ottoman War | Polish–Lithuanian Commonwealth Zaporozhian Cossacks | Ottoman Empire Crimean Khanate Principality of Wallachia | Stanisław Żółkiewski; Jan Chodkiewicz; Władysław IV; Stanisław Koniecpolski; Stanisław Lubomirski; Petro Konashevych-Sahaidachny | Raid on Istanbul; Battle of Cecora; Battle of Khotyn | Indecisive |
| 1621– 1625 | Polish-Swedish War | Polish–Lithuanian Commonwealth | (Sweden) Swedish Empire | Sigismund III; Aleksander Gosiewski; Jan Sapieha | Battle of Kroppenhof; Battle of Listenhoff; Battle of Wallhof | Defeat |
| 1625 | Zhmaylo Uprising | Polish–Lithuanian Commonwealth | Zaporozhian Cossacks | | | Victory |
| 1626– 1629 | Polish-Swedish War | Polish–Lithuanian Commonwealth Holy Roman Empire | (Sweden) Swedish Empire | Sigismund III; Stanisław Koniecpolski; Aleksander Gosiewski; Jan Sapieha; Lew Sapieha; Stanisław Potocki; Hans Georg von Arnim-Boitzenburg; Arend Dickmann | Battle of Gniew; Battle of Wenden; Battle of Czarne; Battle of Dirscha; Battle of Oliwa; Battle of Treiden; Battle of Ostróda; Battle of Górzno; Battle of Trzciana | Defeat |
| 1630 | Fedorovych Uprising | Polish–Lithuanian Commonwealth | Zaporozhian Cossacks | Stanisław Koniecpolski | | Victory |
| 1632– 1634 | Smolensk War | Polish–Lithuanian Commonwealth | Tsardom of Russia | Władysław IV; Krzysztof Radziwiłł; Aleksander Gosiewski | Siege of Dorogobuzh; Siege of Smolensk; Siege of Putivl; Raid on Polotsk; Battle of Smolensk; Siege of Belaya | Victory |
| 1633– 1634 | Polish-Ottoman War | Polish–Lithuanian Commonwealth | Ottoman Empire Crimean Khanate Principality of Wallachia Principality of Moldavia Budjak Horde | Stanisław Koniecpolski | Battle of Sasowy Róg; Battle of Paniowce | Indecisive |
| 1635 | Sulyma Uprising | Polish–Lithuanian Commonwealth | Zaporozhian Cossacks | Stanisław Koniecpolski | | Victory |
| 1637–1638 | Pavlyuk Uprising | Polish–Lithuanian Commonwealth | Zaporozhian Cossacks | Mikołaj Potocki | Battle of Kumeyki | Victory |
| 1638 | Ostryanyn Uprising | Polish–Lithuanian Commonwealth | Zaporozhian Cossacks | Mikołaj Potocki; Jeremi Wiśniowiecki | Battle of Zhovnyn; Siege of the Starzec River | Victory |
| 1648– 1657 | Khmelnytsky Uprising | Polish–Lithuanian Commonwealth Crimean Khanate | Zaporozhian Cossacks Crimean Khanate | John II; Jeremi Wiśniowiecki; Marcin Kalinowski; Mikołaj Potocki; Stefan Potocki; Stefan Czarniecki; Janusz Tyszkiewicz; Władysław Zasławski-Ostrogski; Aleksander Koniecpolski; Janusz Radziwiłł; Wincenty Gosiewski; Władysław Wołłowicz; Mikołaj Ostroróg; Stanisław Lanckoroński; Marek Sobieski; Zygmunt Przyjemski | Battle of Zhovti Vody; Battle of Korsuń; Battle of Starokostiantyniv; Battle of Pyliavts; Battle of Mazyr; Battle of Loyew; Battle of Zahal; Siege of Zbarazh; Battle of Zboriv; Battle of Krasne; Battle of Kopychyntsi; Battle of Berestechko; Battle of Loyew; Battle of Bila Tserkva; Battle of Batih; Siege of Suceava; Battle of Zhvanets; Battle of Okhmativ; Battle of Magierów | Defeat |
| 1651 | Kostka-Napierski uprising | Polish–Lithuanian Commonwealth | Peasants | Wilhelm Jarocki; Michał Jordan | | Victory |
| 1654– 1667 | Russo-Polish War | Polish–Lithuanian Commonwealth Crimean Khanate | Tsardom of Russia Zaporozhian Cossacks | Stefan Czarniecki; Wincenty Gosiewski; John II; Stanisław Lanckoroński; Jerzy Lubomirski; Michał Pac; Stanisław Potocki; Janusz Radziwiłł; Paweł Sapieha; Ivan Vyhovsky; Pavlo Teteria; Filip Obuchowicz; Krzysztof Grodzicki; Władysław Wołłowicz; Jan Pasek; Kazimierz Żeromski | Siege of Smolensk; Siege of Mstislav; Trubetsky Massacre; Battle of Shklow; Battle of Shepeleviche; Battle of Okhmativ; Battle of Vilnius; Battle of Horodok; Siege of Lwów; Battle of Ozerna; Battle of Verkiai; Battle of Myadel; Battle of Konotop; Siege of Lyakhavichy; Siege of Barysaw; Battle of Polonka; Battle of Lyubar; Battle of Slobodyshche; Battle of Basya; Battle of Chudnov; Battle of Kushliki; Battle of Vitebsk; Battle of Stavishche; Siege of Hlukhiv | Defeat |
| 1655– 1660 | Northern War of 1655–1660 (Second Northern War) | Polish–Lithuanian Commonwealth Crimean Khanate | (Sweden) Swedish Empire Zaporozhian Cossacks | Krzysztof Opaliński; John II; Stanisław Lanckoroński; Aleksander Koniecpolski; Stefan Czarniecki; Jan Krasiński; Stasnisław Potocki; Augustyn Kordecki; Stanisław Warszycki; Jan Zamoyski; Jerzy Lubomirski; Krzysztof Grodzicki | (list of battles) | Disputed |
| 1665–1666 | Lubomirski's rebellion | Polish–Lithuanian Commonwealth | Forces loyal to Jerzy Sebastian Lubomirski | John II; Stanisław "Rewera" Potocki; John III; Michał Kazimierz Pac | Battle of Częstochowa; Battle of Mątwy | Defeat |
| 1666– 1671 | Polish-Cossack-Tatar War | Polish–Lithuanian Commonwealth | Zaporozhian Cossacks Crimean Khanate Ottoman Empire | John III; Sebastian Machowski | Battle of Ściana; Battle of Podhajc; Battle of Bracław; Battle of Kalnik | Victory |
| 1672– 1676 | Polish-Ottoman War | Polish–Lithuanian Commonwealth | Ottoman Empire Zaporozhian Cossacks Crimean Khanate Lipka Tatars | John III; Mikołaj Potocki; Mykhailo Khanenko; Michał Radziwiłł; Jan Chrzanowski | Battle of Ladyzhyn; Siege of Kamenets; Battle of Krasnobród; Battle of Niemirów; Battle of Komarno; Battle of Kalush; Battle of Khotyn; Battle of Lwów; Battle of Trembowla; Battle of Żurawno | Defeat |
| 1683– 1699 | Polish-Ottoman War | Polish–Lithuanian Commonwealth Archduchy of Austria | Ottoman Empire | John III Sobieski; Stanisław Jan Jabłonowski; Mikołaj Hieronim Sieniawski; Marcin Kątski; Stefan Kunicki; James Louis Sobieski; Kazimierz Jan Sapieha; Feliks Kazimierz Potocki | Battle of Vienna; Battle of Párkány; Siege of Kamenets; Battle of Hodów; Battle of Ustechk; Battle of Podhajce | Victory: Treaty of Karlowitz |
| 1697–1702 | Lithuanian Civil War | Anti–Sapieha Coalition | Saphieha family and allies | John III; Augustus II | | Victory |
| 1700– 1721 | Great Northern War | Augustus II the Strong (1700–04, 1709–) Tsardom of Russia Denmark–Norway (1700, 1709–) Electorate of Saxony (1700–06, 1709–) Augustus II the Strong (1700–04, 1709–) Cossack Hetmanate (1700–08, 1709–1721) Kingdom of Prussia (1715–) (Province of Hanover) Electorate of Hanover (1715-) others | Stanisław Leszczyński (1704–09) (Sweden) Swedish Empire Ottoman Empire (1710–14) Cossack Hetmanate (1708–09) others | Augustus II; Hieronim Augustyn Lubomirski; Grzegorz Antoni Ogiński; Michał Serwacy Wiśniowiecki; Ludwik Pociej; Jan Kazimierz Sapieha; Józef Potocki; Adam Mikołaj Sieniawski | (list of battles) | Victory: Treaty of Nystad |
| 1702–1704 | Paliy Uprising | Polish–Lithuanian Commonwealth | Zaporozhian Cossacks | Adam Mikołaj Sieniawski | | Victory |
| 1715–1716 | Tarnogród Confederation | Polish–Lithuanian Commonwealth | Szlachta part of the Confederation Russian Empire | | Battle of Radgoszcz; Battle of Ryczywoł; Second Battle of Sokal; Battle of Leszno; Battle of Kowalewo | Defeat |
| 1733– 1735 | War of the Polish Succession | Stanisław Leszczyński Kingdom of France Kingdom of Spain Duchy of Savoy | Augustus III of Poland Habsburg Monarchy Russian Empire Electorate of Saxony Kingdom of Prussia | Stanisław I Leszczyński; Augustus III of Poland; Jan Tarło; Adam Tarło | Siege of Danzig; Battle of Wyszecin; Battle of Miechów | Internal conflict: Treaty of Vienna |
| 1734 | Haidamak Uprising | Polish–Lithuanian Commonwealth Russian Empire Crimean Tatars | Haidamaks | | | Polish–Russian victory |
| 1750 | Haidamak Uprising | Polish–Lithuanian Commonwealth Russian Empire | Haidamaks | | | Polish–Russian victory |
| 1764 | Civil war in the Commonwealth | Polish–Lithuanian Commonwealth | Hetmans Russian Empire | | | Internal conflict |
| 1768–1769 | Koliivshchyna | Polish–Lithuanian Commonwealth Russian Empire | Haidamaks | Jan Klemens Branicki; Mikhail Krechetnikov | | Polish–Russian victory |
| 1768–1772 | War of the Bar Confederation | Polish–Lithuanian Commonwealth | Russian Empire | Karol Radziwiłł; Casimir Pulaski; Michał Jan Pac; Maurice Benyovszky | (list of battles) | Defeat |
| 1792 | Polish-Russian War | Polish–Lithuanian Commonwealth | Russian Empire Targowica Confederation | Józef Poniatowski; Tadeusz Kościuszko; Michał Wielhorski; Józef Judycki; Józef Bielak; Szymon Zabiełło | (list of battles) | Defeat |
| 1794 | Kościuszko Uprising | Polish–Lithuanian Commonwealth | Russian Empire Prussia | Tadeusz Kościuszko; Antoni Madaliński; Jakub Jasiński; Tomasz Wawrzecki; Stanisław Mokronowski; Józef Zajączek; Józef Bielak; Antoni Chlewiński; Jan Henryk Dąbrowski; Michał Wielhorski; Józef Poniatowski; Eustachy Sanguszko; Romuald Giedroyć | (list of battles) | Defeat |

== Napoleonic Wars (Duchy of Warsaw) ==
Poles unsuccessfully struggled to win back their independence throughout the 19th century. At first, they put their hopes in Napoleon. Later, they tried to ignite national uprisings every now and then – most of them bloodily repressed.

| Date | Conflict | Belligerents 1 | Belligerents 2 | Leaders | Events | Result |
|---|---|---|---|---|---|---|
| 1797 | Denisko uprising | Polish insurgents Ottoman Empire Great Britain France | (Austria) Austrian Empire | Joachim Denisko; Julian Sierawski | | Defeat |
| 1798– 1802 | War of the Second Coalition | France Polish Legions Spain Denmark–Norway French client republics: Batavian Republic; Helvetic Republic; (Kingdom of Italy (Napoleonic)) Cisalpine Republic; (Kingdom of Italy (Napoleonic)) Roman Republic (until 1799); (Kingdom of Italy (Napoleonic)) Parthenopaean Republic (1799) | Second Coalition: Holy Roman Empire: (Habsburg monarchy) Austria; Great Britain (until 1801) United Kingdom (from 1801) Russia (until 1799) Ottoman Empire Portugal Kingdom of Naples Grand Duchy of Tuscany (Sovereign Military Order of Malta) Order of Saint John (1798) Malta (1798–1800) (Kingdom of France) French Royalists | | Battles of the War of the Second Coalition involving Poland | Victory |
| 1803– 1806 | War of the Third Coalition | (France) French Empire: Polish Legions; (Kingdom of Italy (Napoleonic)) Kingdom of Etruria; Batavian Republic; Napoleonic Italy; Spain; Electorate of Bavaria; Württemberg | Holy Roman Empire Russian Empire United Kingdom Kingdom of Naples (Kingdom of the Two Sicilies) Kingdom of Sicily Sweden (Kingdom of France) French royalists | | Battles of the War of the Third Coalition involving Poland | Victory |
| 1806– 1807 | War of the Fourth Coalition | (France) French Empire: Polish Legions; Confederation of the Rhine: Bavaria; Württemberg; Saxony; Napoleonic Italy; Kingdom of Naples; (Kingdom of Italy (Napoleonic)) Etruria; (Netherlands) Holland; Spain; (Switzerland) Swiss Confederation | Prussia Russia United Kingdom Saxony Sweden Sicily | | Battles of the War of the Fourth Coalition involving Poland | Victory |
| 1808– 1814 | Peninsular War | (France) French Empire Polish Legions | Spain United Kingdom Portugal | Józef Poniatowski; Józef Chłopicki; Jan Kozietulski; Jan Konopka; Franciszek Młokosiewicz | First siege of Zaragoza; Battle of Gamonal; Battle of Espinosa de los Monteros; Battle of Tudela; Battle of Somosierra; Second siege of Zaragoza; Battle of Los Yébenes; Battle of Ciudad Real; Battle of Talavera; Battle of Almonacid; Battle of Ocaña; Battle of Alcañiz; Battle of Belchite; Battle of Saguntum; Battle of Fuengirola; Battle of Baza; Battle of Zújar; Siege of Tarifa; Battle of Albuera; Battle of Arroyo dos Molinos | Defeat |
| 1809 | War of the Fifth Coalition | (France) French Empire: Duchy of Warsaw; Confederation of the Rhine: Bavaria; Saxony; Württemberg; Westphalia; Napoleonic Italy; Naples; Switzerland; (Netherlands) Holland | (Austria) Austrian Empire: Hungary; Tyrol (in rebellion against Bavaria); United Kingdom Spain (Kingdom of the Two Sicilies) Sicily Sardinia Black Brunswickers | Józef Poniatowski; Frederick Augustus I | Battle of Wagram | Victory |
| 1809 | Austro-Polish War | Duchy of Warsaw Kingdom of Saxony (France) French Empire | (Austria) Austrian Empire | Józef Poniatowski; Berke Joselewicz; Michał Sokolnicki; Józef Zajączek | Battle of Raszyn; Battle of Grochów; Battle of Radzymin; Battle of Ostrówek; Skirmish at Kock; Siege of Toruń; Battle of Jedlińsk; Battle of Zaleszczyki | Victory: Treaty of Schönbrunn |
| 1812 | French Invasion of Russia | (France) French Empire: Duchy of Warsaw; Napoleonic Italy; Naples; Confederation of the Rhine; Baden; Bavaria; Berg; Saxony; Westphalia; Napoleonic Spain; (Switzerland) Swiss Confederation | Russian Empire | Józef Poniatowski; Aleksander Różniecki; Józef Zajączek; Franciszek Kossecki; Jan Dąbrowski | Battle of Mir; Battle of Smolensk; Battle of Shevardino; Battle of Borodino; French occupation of Moscow; Battle of Tarutino; Battle of Vyazma; Battle of Nowo Schwerschen; Battle of Kaidanowo; Battle of Krasnoi; Battle of Borisov; Battle of Berezina | Defeat |
| 1812– 1814 | War of the Sixth Coalition | First French Empire: Duchy of Warsaw; Napoleonic Italy; Kingdom of Naples | Original Coalition Russian Empire Prussia Austrian Empire United Kingdom Sweden Spain Portugal Two Sicilies Kingdom of Sardinia After Battle of Leipzig: Saxony; Bavaria; Württemberg; Netherlands | Józef Poniatowski; Dezydery Chłapowski | German campaign of 1813; Battle of Lützen; Battle of Bautzen; Battle of Kulm; Battle of Dennewitz; Battle of Leipzig; Battle of Sehested; Battle of Montmirail; Battle of Montereau; Battle of Reims | Defeat |

== Poland under partitions (1815–1918) ==
Poles unsuccessfully struggled to win back their independence throughout the 19th century. At first, they put their hopes in Napoleon. Later, they tried to ignite national uprisings every now and then – most of them bloodily repressed.

| Date | Conflict | Belligerents 1 | Belligerents 2 | Leaders | Events | Result |
|---|---|---|---|---|---|---|
| 1830– 1831 | November Uprising | Kingdom of Poland | Russian Empire | Józef Chłopicki; Jan Zygmunt Skrzynecki; Michał Gedeon Radziwiłł; Maciej Rybiński; Emilia Plater | Battles during the November Uprising | Defeat |
| 1846 | Kraków Uprising | Poles | (Austria) Austrian Empire Russian Empire | Jan Tyssowski | Chochołowian uprising; Battle of Gdów | Defeat: Rabacja Galicyjska |
| 1848 | Greater Poland Uprising | Poles | Prussia | Ludwik Mierosławski | Battle of Miłosław | Defeat |
| 1863– 1864 | January Uprising | Poles | Russian Empire | Romuald Traugutt | Battles during the January Uprising | Defeat |
| 1905– 1907 | Revolution of 1905: Revolution of 1905 in Poland | Polish revolutionaries Russian revolutionaries | Russian Empire (Poland) Polish conservatives | | Łódź insurrection; Bloody Wednesday | Defeat |
| 1914– 1918 | World War I | German Empire Austria-Hungary (Poland) Polish Legions Central Powers | Russian Empire: (Poland) Polish Armed Forces; British Empire (France) French Third Republic: (Poland) Blue Army; Allies | Józef Piłsudski; Józef Haller; Marian Januszajtis-Żegota; Stanisław Szeptycki; Mieczysław Ryś-Trojanowski | Battles of World War I involving Poland; Battle of Krzywopłoty; Battle of Łowczówek; Charge of Rokitna; Battle of Kostiuchnówka; Battle of Krechowce; Battle of Rarańcza; Battle of Kaniów | Victory (Note: Defeat of Central Powers and Russia, but fulfilling the goal of Polish national liberation movements) |

== Second Polish Republic (1918–1939) ==
In the turmoil of the First World War, Poles managed to regain independence and then to expand their territory in a series of local wars and uprisings; only to be occupied again during the Second World War.

| Date | Conflict | Belligerents 1 | Belligerents 2 | Leaders | Events | Result |
|---|---|---|---|---|---|---|
| 1918– 1919 | Polish-Ukrainian War | Second Polish Republic Kingdom of Romania | (Ukraine) West Ukrainian People's Republic Ukrainian People's Republic | Józef Piłsudski; Józef Haller | Battles during the Polish–Ukrainian War | Victory: Treaty of Warsaw |
| 1918– 1919 | Soviet westward offensive | Second Polish Republic Ukrainian People's Republic | (Russian Soviet Federative Socialist Republic) Russian SFSR | Józef Piłsudski | | Victory |
| 1918– 1919 | Greater Poland Uprising | (Second Polish Republic) Poles | Weimar Republic | | Battle of Ławica; Battle of Rawicz | Victory |
| 1919 | Januszajtis putsch | Government–loyal army | ND | Józef Piłsudski; Jędrzej Moraczewski | | Internal conflict: Defeating the putschists |
| 1919 | Polish–Czechoslovak War | Second Polish Republic | Czechoslovakia | Franciszek Latinik | Battle of Skoczów | Indecisive |
| 1919 | First Silesian Uprising | (Second Polish Republic) Poles | Weimar Republic | Alfons Zgrzebniok | | Defeat |
| 1920 | Second Silesian Uprising | (Second Polish Republic) Poles | Weimar Republic | | | Victory |
| 1919– 1921 | Silesian Uprisings | (Second Polish Republic) Poles | Weimar Republic | Wojciech Korfanty | Battle of Annaberg | Ceasefire |
| 1919– 1921 | Polish-Soviet War | Second Polish Republic | (Russian Soviet Federative Socialist Republic) Russian SFSR Ukrainian SSR Byelorussian SSR Polrewkom | Józef Piłsudski; Tadeusz Rozwadowski | Battles of the Polish–Soviet War | Victory |
| 1919– 1920 | Polish-Lithuanian War | Second Polish Republic: Central Lithuania | Lithuania | Lucjan Żeligowski | Żeligowski's Mutiny; Battles of the Polish–Lithuanian War | Victory |
| 1923 | 1923 Kraków riot | Second Polish Republic | Polish Socialist Party | | | Internal conflict: Government crackdown on striking workers |
| 1926 | May Coup | Government–loyal army | Sanation–loyal army | Stanisław Wojciechowski; Wincenty Witos | | Internal conflict: Sanation takeover government |
| 1932 | Lesko uprising | Second Polish Republic | Peasants | | | Internal conflict |

== Poland during World War II (1939–1945) ==
The history of Poland from 1939 to 1945 encompasses primarily the period from the invasion of Poland by Nazi Germany and the Soviet Union to the end of World War II. Following the German–Soviet non-aggression pact, Poland was invaded by Nazi Germany on 1 September 1939 and by the Soviet Union on 17 September. The campaigns ended in early October with Germany and the Soviet Union dividing and annexing the whole of Poland. After the Axis attack on the Soviet Union in the summer of 1941, the entirety of Poland was occupied by Germany, which proceeded to advance its racial and genocidal policies across Poland.

| Date | Conflict | Belligerents 1 | Belligerents 2 | Leaders | Events | Result |
|---|---|---|---|---|---|---|
| 1939 | Jabłonków incident | Second Polish Republic | Nazi Germany | | | Victory |
| 1939 | World War II – September Campaign | Second Polish Republic | Nazi Germany: Slovakia; Soviet Union | Edward Śmigły-Rydz; Tadeusz Kutrzeba; Wacław Stachiewicz; Juliusz Rómmel; Antoni Szylling; Franciszek Kleeberg | Bombing of Wieluń; Defence of Westerplatte; Battle of Mokra; Battle of Wizna; Siege of Warsaw; Battle of the Bzura; Battle of Lwów; Battle of Grodno; Defense of Hel Peninsula; Battle of Kock | Defeat: Partition of Poland |
| 1939– 1945 | World War II – Polish resistance | Polish Underground State: Armia Krajowa; Armia Ludowa; Bataliony Chłopskie; Narodowe Siły Zbrojne; Other Polish underground organisations | Nazi Germany: (Nazi Germany) General Government; Slovakia; Other axis powers | Henryk Dobrzański; Stefan Rowecki; Tadeusz Komorowski; August Emil Fieldorf; Franciszek Kamiński; Marian Spychalski; Michał Rola-Żymierski | fights of Hubal Unit; Zamość uprising; Akcja "Burza"; Operation Ostra Brama; Warsaw Uprising | Indecisive (Note: Success of the Zamość Uprising, partial success of Akcja "Burza") |
| 1939– 1945 | World War II – Western Front | Polish government-in-exile Allies: UK; France; Others | Nazi Germany Italy: Other axis powers | Władysław Sikorski; Władysław Anders; Stanisław Maczek; Zygmunt Bohusz-Szyszko; Jan Zumbach | Battle of the Atlantic; Battle of Narvik; French campaign; Battle of Britain; Siege of Tobruk; Battle of Monte Cassino; Falaise pocket; Operation Market Garden; Liberation of Breda; Operation Pheasant; Battle of Wilhelmshaven | Victory: Potsdam Conference |
| 1943– 1945 | World War II – Eastern Front | (Polish People's Republic) Polish Republic Soviet Union | Nazi Germany: Slovakia; Other axis powers | Zygmunt Berling; Michał Rola-Żymierski; Karol Świerczewski; Władysław Korczyc; Stanisław Popławski; Antoni Siwicki | Battle of Lenino; Battle of Studzianki; Battles for the Warsaw Bridgeheads; Liberation of Warsaw; East Pomeranian offensive; Battle of Kołobrzeg; Breakthrough of Pomerenian Wall; Battle of Rothenburg; Battle of Budziszyn; Battle of Berlin; Prague offensive | Victory: Potsdam Conference |

== Communist Poland (1945–1989) ==
The second half of the 20th century was more peaceful, but still tense, as Poland was involved in the Cold War on the Soviet side.

| Date | Conflict | Belligerents 1 | Belligerents 2 | Leaders | Events | Result |
|---|---|---|---|---|---|---|
| 1939– 1947 | Polish–Ukrainian conflict | Polish Underground State (Poland) Polish People's Republic Soviet Union | Ukrainian Insurgent Army Nazi Germany Cursed soldiers | Karol Świerczewski; Stefan Mossor | Defence of Huta Stara; Defence of Huta Stepańska and Wyrka; Attack on Hrubieszów; Przebraże Defence; Battles for Bircza; Akcja „Wisła”; Battle of Ulhówek and Rzeczyca | Victory |
| 1944–1953 | Anti-communist resistance in Poland | (Poland) Polish People's Republic | Cursed soldiers | Bolesław Bierut; Stanisław Radkiewicz; Konstantin Rokossovsky | Battle of Surkonty; Attack on the NKVD Camp in Rembertów; Battle of Kuryłówka; Raid on Kielce Prison; Augustów roundup; Attack on Hrubieszów; 1946 pacification of villages by PAS NZW | Internal conflict: Defeat of the Cursed soldiers |
| 1945 | Racibórz Conflict | (Poland) Polish People's Republic | Czechoslovakia | Michał Rola-Żymierski | | Indecisive |
| 1945 | Kórnica Uprising | (Poland) Polish People's Republic | (Germany) Germans | Kazimierz Wrona | | Victory |
| 1945 | Walce Uprising | (Poland) Polish People's Republic | (Germany) Germans | Kazimierz Wrona | | Victory |
| 1949–1955 | Operation Jungle | Soviet Union (Poland) Polish People's Republic | United Kingdom West Germany Sweden Denmark United States | Bolesław Bierut | | Victory |
| 1968 | Invasion of Czechoslovakia | Warsaw Pact: Soviet Union People's Republic of Poland People's Republic of Hungary People's Republic of Bulgaria East Germany | Czechoslovakia | Władysław Gomułka; Marian Spychalski; Józef Cyrankiewicz; Wojciech Jaruzelski | | Victory |

== Third Polish Republic (1989–present) ==
At the beginning of the 21st century Poland is involved in the War against terrorism on the NATO side.

| Date | Conflict | Belligerents 1 | Belligerents 2 | Leaders | Events | Result |
|---|---|---|---|---|---|---|
| 1990– 1991 | Gulf War | United States; United Kingdom; France; Saudi Arabia; Egypt; Kuwait; (United Nations) Coalition: Afghan mujahideen; Argentina; Australia; Bahrain; Bangladesh; Belgium; Canada; Czechoslovakia; Denmark; Germany; Greece; Honduras; Hungary; Italy; Japan; Luxembourg; Morocco; Netherlands; New Zealand; Niger; Norway; Oman; Pakistan; Philippines; Poland; Portugal; Qatar; Romania; Senegal; Sierra Leone; Singapore; South Korea; Spain; Sweden; Syria; Turkey; United Arab Emirates | Iraq | | | Coalition victory: State of Kuwait resumes self-governance over all Kuwaiti sovereign territory; Establishment of a demilitarized zone and construction of a separation barrier along the Iraq–Kuwait border |
| 1994–1995 | Operation Uphold Democracy | United States; Argentina; Poland Haitian Opposition CARICOM: Antigua and Barbuda; Bahamas; Barbados; Belize; Guyana; Jamaica; Trinidad and Tobago | Haiti | Sławomir Petelicki | Operation Maintain Democracy | US-led coalition victory: Military regime removed, Raoul Cédras deposed; Jean-Bertrand Aristide sworn back into office. |
| 2003-2011 | Iraq War | Coalition of the willing: United States; United Kingdom; Australia; Poland; Kurdistan Region: KDP; PUK; Iraqi National Congress: Free Iraqi Forces | Republic of Iraq; MEK | Aleksander Kwaśniewski | Battle of Umm Qasr; Battle of Al Faw; Battle of Basra; Battle of Hillah | Indecisive/Other Result |
| 2007-2021 | War in Afghanistan (Polish intervention): Operation Achilles; Operation Eagle's Feather | Poland Afghan National Army | Taliban | | | Afghan Victory |
| 2013–2014 | Operation Serval | France Mali Poland Others | Islamic militants | Bronisław Komorowski | | Victory |

== See also ==
- History of the Polish Army
- List of Napoleonic battles
- List of wars involving Germany
- List of wars involving Russia
- List of wars involving Ukraine
- Polish–Ottoman Wars
- Polish–Russian Wars
- Polish–Swedish wars

== Bibliography ==
- Spieralski, Zdzisław (1967). Awantury Mołdawskie (in Polish). Wiedza Powszechna.
- Gąsowski, Tomasz (1999). Bitwy polskie: leksykon. Kraków: Społeczny Instytut Wydawniczy Znak. ISBN 83-7006-787-5.
- Kozłowski, Eligiusz; Wrzosek, Mieczysław (1984). Historia oręża polskiego 1795–1939. Warszawa: Wiedza Powszechna. ISBN 83-214-0339-5.
- Lawson, M. K. (2004). Cnut – England's Viking King (2nd ed.). Stroud: Tempus. ISBN 0-7524-2964-7.
- Nowak, Tadeusz M.; Wimmer, Jan (1981). Historia oręża polskiego 963–1795. Warszawa: Wiedza Powszechna. ISBN 83-214-0133-3.
- Reuter, Timothy (1995). The New Cambridge Medieval History: Volume 3, c.900–c.1024. Cambridge: Cambridge University Press. p. 891. ISBN 9780521364478.
- Sikorski, Janusz (1972). Zarys historii wojskowości powszechnej do końca wieku XIX. Warszawa: Wydawnictwo Ministerstwa Obrony Narodowej. OCLC 20835374.
- Winged Hussars, Radoslaw Sikora, Bartosz Musialowicz, BUM Magazine, 2016.
- Włodarski, Bronisław (1927), Polityka ruska Leszka białego, vol. III
- Pashuto, Vladimir (1968), Внешняя политика Руси [The foreign policy of Russia] (in Russian), Moscow: Наука
- Urbańczyk, Przemysław (2017). Bolesław Chrobry - Lew Ryczący (PDF). Toruń. ISBN 9788323138860.
- Koziel, Patryk (2021). Wyprawa polska z 1552 roku jako próba odbudowy wpływów politycznych w Mołdawii [The Polish expedition of 1552 as an attempt at reconstruction of political influence in Moldova] (PDF). I Liceum Ogólnokształcące im. Henryka Sienkiewicza w Kołuszkach.
- Grudziński, Tadeusz (2010). Bolesław Śmiały-Szczodry i biskup Stanisław. Dzieje konfliktu [Bolesław the Bold and Bishop Stanisław. A conflict is taking place] (in Polish). Universitas Press. ISBN 9788324214525.
- Kohn, George Childs (2013). Dictionary of Wars (2nd ed.). Taylor & Francis (published 31 October 2013). ISBN 9781135954949.
- Bunar, Piotr; Sroka, Stanisław A. (2004). Słownik wojen, bitew i potyczek w średniowiecznej Polsce [Wars, battles and skirmishes in Medieval Poland] (in Polish). Universitas Press. ISBN 9788370524449.
- Steinhübel, Ján (2020). The Nitrian Principality: The Beginnings of Medieval Slovakia. Brill Publishing (published 15 December 2020). ISBN 9789004438637.
- Wiszewski, Przemysław (2010). Domus Bolezlai: Values and Social Identity in Dynastic Traditions of Medieval Poland (c. 966-1138). Brill Publishing. ISBN 9789004181427.

Return to top of page.
