= Battle of Myślibórz =

August 1278 battle between Poland and Brandenburg

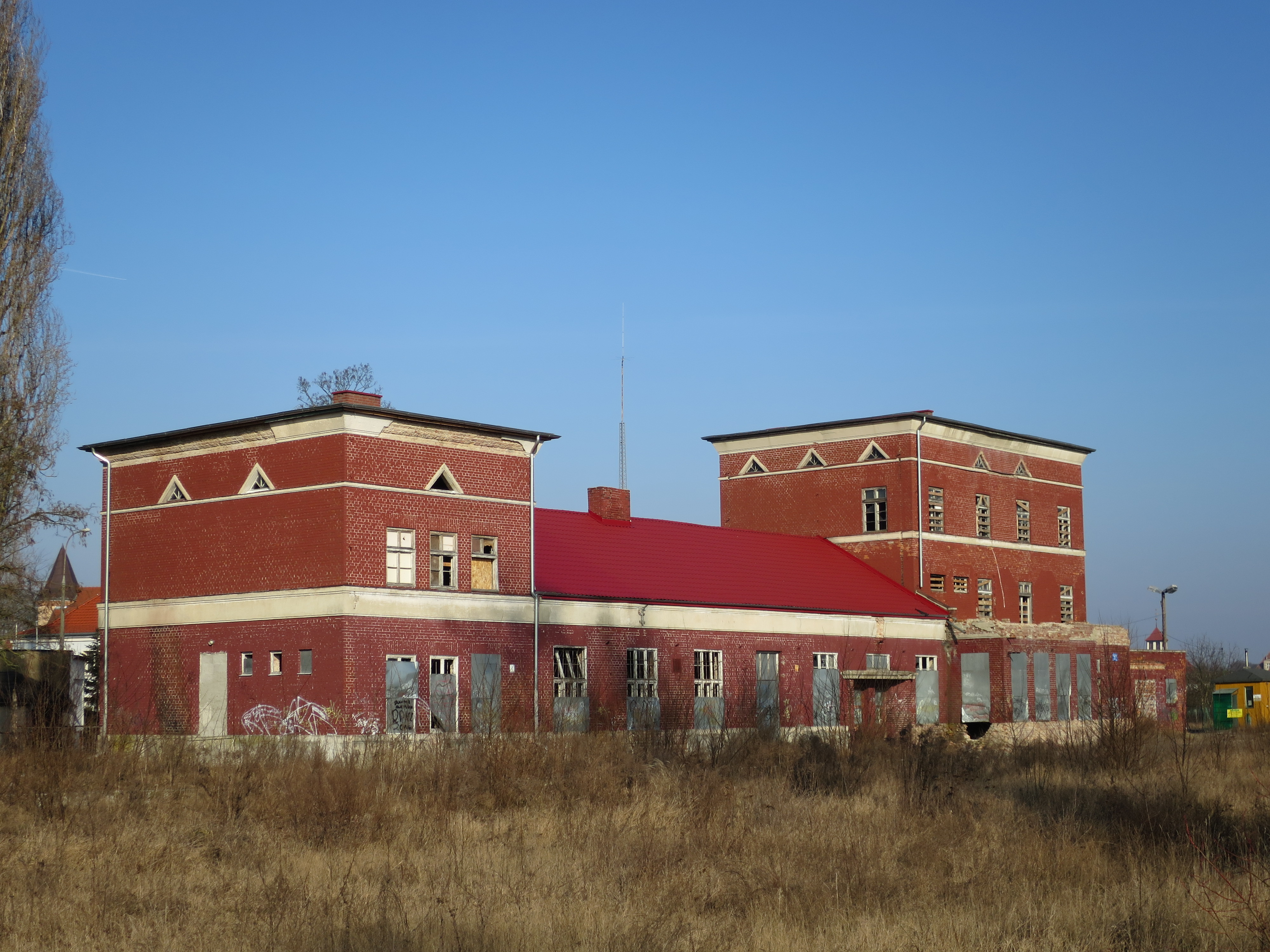
- The train station of modern–day Myślibórz
Date	August 1278
Location	Myślibórz
Result	Polish victory
Territorial changes	Duchy of Greater Poland gains Santok

Belligerents
Duchy of Greater Poland; Duchy of Pomerelia	Margraviate of Brandenburg

Commanders and leaders
Bolesław the Pious; Mestwin II	Otto IV

The Battle of Myślibórz (also known as the Battle of Soldin) was a battle which took place in August 1278. It was fought between the Duchy of Greater Poland led by Bolesław the Pious and the Duchy of Pomerelia led by prince Mestwin II against the Margraviate of Brandenburg led by Otto IV. It resulted in a Polish victory.

== Prelude ==
The Polish had lost Santok and Drzeń to the Margraviate of Brandenburg in the early 70s of the 13th century. These were two important border towns, so recovering them was a priority for Bolesław.

Taking advantage of the involvement of the Margraviate of Brandenburg in other areas, primarily in the rivalry between the Habsburgs and the Přemyslids in the Reich, Bolesław, aided by the troops of the Duchy of Pomerelia prince Mestwin II, attacked and devastated the disputed areas on the Noteć.

== Battle ==
In the battle, Polish troops defeated the troops of Otto IV.

== Aftermath ==
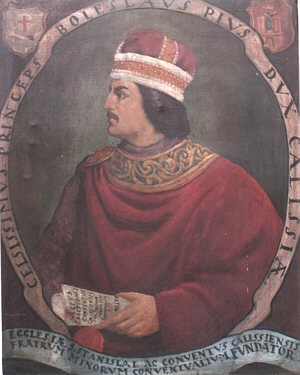
Portrait of Bolesław the Pious

After the battle, Otto IV's troops went to Gorzów, sheltering behind the city walls. Following the victorious expedition, Santok was reclaimed.

== Legacy ==
It was Bolesław the Pious's last ever campaign before his death a year later.

The Battle of Myślibórz is also confirmed to have happened by local tradition preserved in the history of the city from 1732.

== See also ==
- List of wars involving Poland
