= Siege of Polotsk (1563) =

- Part of Russo-Lithuanian War of 1561–1570 as part of Livonian War
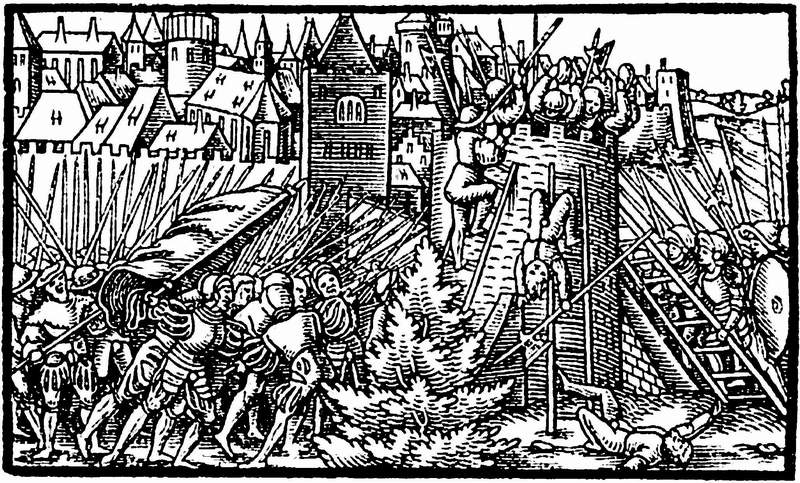
- The siege of Polotsk from the Augsburg leaflet, widely distributed in Germany
Date	31 January – 15 February 1563
Location	Polotsk, Grand Duchy of Lithuania (Modern day Belarus) 55°29′N 28°48′E
Result	Russian victory
Territorial changes	Fall of the city and the capture of the east of Lithuania

Belligerents
Russian Tsardom	Grand Duchy of Lithuania

Commanders and leaders
Ivan IV Vasilyevich	Stanislav Dvoina (surrendered)

Strength
31,206 to 45,000	2,400–6,000

Casualties and losses
86 dead & wounded	Entire Garrison surrendered
- 3,000 Residential yards burned down as a result of the bombing

The siege of Polotsk (Note: (Russian: Осада Полоцка; Polish: Oblężenie Połocka; Lithuanian: Polocko Apgultis)) was the siege of the Lithuanian fortress of Polotsk that took place in the winter of 1562 and 1563. The siege is considered one of the largest campaigns of the Russian army in the 16th century. The fall of the city caused a resonance throughout Europe and raised the prestige of the Russian tsar. The siege is considered one of the greatest in the history of Russia before the Empire.

== Background ==
In 1560, the Russians ended the war with the Livonian order, and it was torn apart between Sweden, Muscovy and Lithuania. However, Tsar Ivan was dissatisfied with the prevailing situation and the war with Lithuania began. Russians devastated Mstislavl, and the Poles raided Livonia, where a major battle took place near Nevel, as a result of which a large Russian detachment was unable to repel and catch up with a group of Poles.

=== Preparing a hike ===
In the autumn of 1562, preparations began for a full-scale invasion of Lithuania, the purpose of which was to become the fortress of Polotsk. At this time, King Sigismund tried to authorize negotiations, fearing Russian weapons, but unsuccessfully. The Moscow army gathered from 17 cities. The campaign itself resembled a crusade, in order to liberate the ancient Russian cities from the occupation of Catholics.

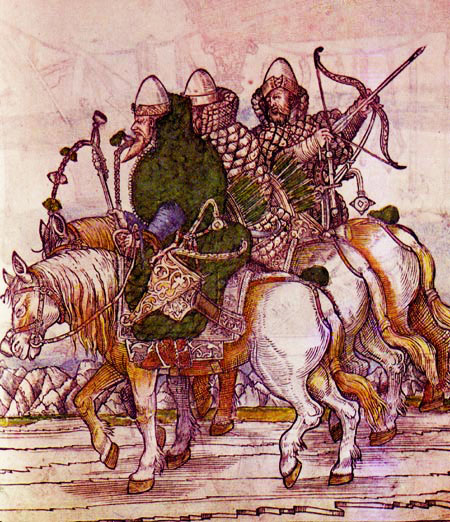
Elite of the Muscovite army, noble cavalry

The fortress itself was also a rich industrial city, but very well fortified. The city was divided into several parts, and had moats and a log fence. There was also a citadel. The assembled troops concentrated in Mozhaisk, and for several days they were engaged in the usual routine. Before the campaign, Ivan decided to hold a solemn entry into the city, but on December 17 the army marched to meet Polotsk.

=== Forces of the parties ===
Given the large-scale preparations, Moscow had a large army. Sources at the time report that an army of 360,000 moved on the city, but these figures are largely exaggerated. A collection of documents on the campaign, "Polotsk book" (Russian: Полоцкая книга), reports that there were 31,206 people in the entire army. Modern authors assume that more reinforcements from the Tatars arrived immediately at the time of the siege; according to this, the total number was 45,000.

According to one source, the Lithuanian garrison consisted of 2,400 people (Note: 2,000 Lithuanians and 400 poles) up to 6,000.

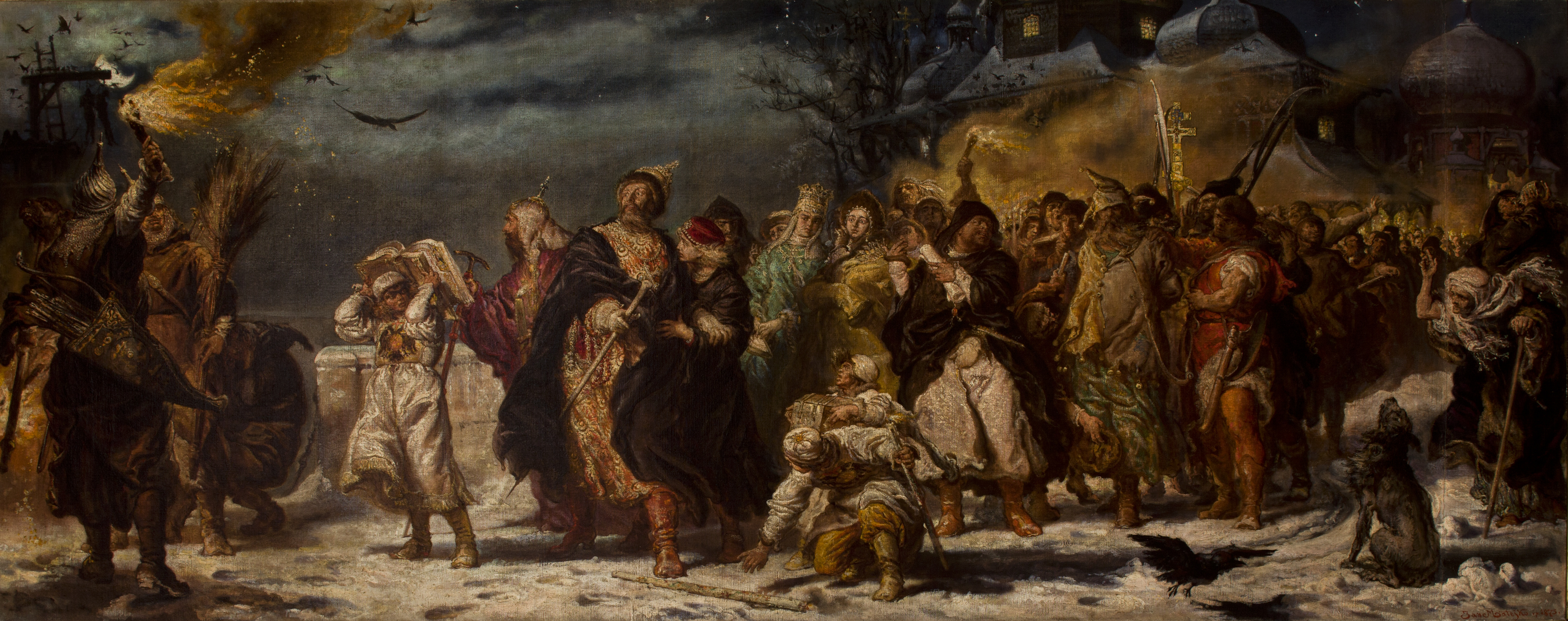
Russian Tsar Ivan the Terrible

== Campaign ==
=== March to city ===
The transition to the city was quite difficult. The stretched army was forced to march quickly and at the same time provide protection for the baggage train. Due to the difficulties at this moment, there were cases of defection to the enemy, which allowed the Lithuanians to prepare a siege.

=== Military action ===
The Russians began the siege of the city on January 31, 1562.

At that time, preparations were underway for the siege. The city was planned to be stormed. Initially the assault should begin on the ice of a frozen lake, but such actions were too dangerous and the plan had to be reworked. At this time, the ground forces, which allegedly numbered 40,000, were supposed to lift the siege of the city. In fact Radziwill planned to sow panic and force the Russians to lift the siege, but this did not happen. Two detachments of Tatars and Muscovites moved to meet the Lithuanians, and the Hetman evaded the battle.

On February 5, the first assault took place. The Streltsy set fire to the forward tower and occupied it, but after meeting stubborn resistance they retreated. The main reason for the failure was the unavailability of heavy artillery.

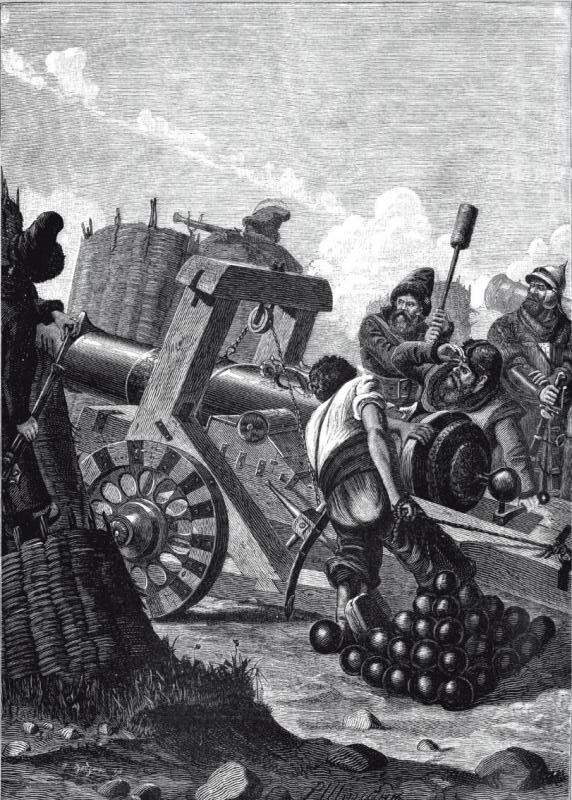
Russian siege artillery

=== First negotiations ===
On the evening of February 5, the garrison requested negotiations, Tsar Ivan agreed and a delegation of the Orthodox nobility of the city arrived to him. They asked for time until February 6, and the Muscovites agreed. The next day, a new delegation arrived. The garrison repeatedly requested an extension of time until February 9. Ivan agreed to extend it until February 7. In the following days The garrison constantly tried to delay negotiations and the Russians began bombing the city again.

=== Surrender of the garrison ===
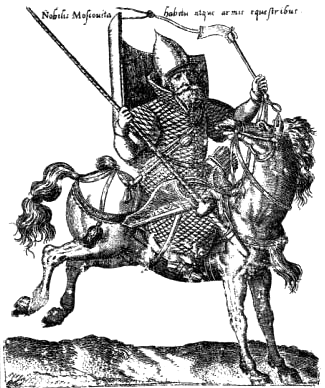
Moscow cavalryman in 16th century

When the heavy artillery bombardment began, hell broke out inside the city. In one day, up to 3,000 yards were destroyed and the second assault began, following which Dmitry Hvorostin's detachment occupied the main part of the city, Veliky Posad, which was engulfed in fire. In this battle, the Polish part of the garrison suffered heavy losses. Being in a desperate situation, the garrison tried to make a sortie, but unsuccessfully, and returned to the remains of the fortress. There was no point in continuing resistance, and on February 15 the garrison capitulated on relatively mild conditions. The Russians released the heroically defending Poles without taking their weapons and banners and accepted peaceful refugees in the camp, where they were provided with provisions and provided with care. However, such leniency was caused by unwillingness to involve Poland in the war.

== Result ==
As a result, Moscow seized an incredibly important fortress, having opened its way to Vilna. The siege is noted as one of the most striking Russian victories in the Livonian War, which also made a huge impression on contemporaries.

== Reaction in Europe ==
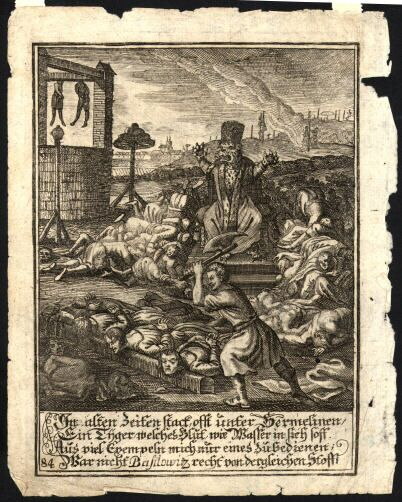
An allegory of the atrocities of the Russian Tsar. A picture from David Fassman's German diary «Conversations in the realm of the dead».

The capture of the fortress surprised the whole of Europe, and they tried to turn the action into a tragedy. German leaflets of that time constantly flashed information that the Muscovites had killed more than 80,000 inhabitants, despite the fact that the city itself could not fit more than 20,000. In fact, all the residents of the city were accepted into the Russian camp, and when the city was restored, they were resettled there again. Subsequently, Mikołaj Radziwiłł the Black organized a propaganda campaign against the Russians and released a popular leaflet, "the terrible invasion of Polotsk". There was also a widespread version that said that Jews who refused to be baptized were drowned in the city. However, the reliability of this statement is in doubt.

== Aftermath ==
The city was under Russian control for another 16 years. Even a major success at Ula a year later did not allow the Lithuanians to encroach on the fortress. This victory, like the at Orsha 50 years ago, made no sense, and the Lithuanians lost the campaign anyway.

The city was returned only in 1579, when the Polish-Lithuanian troops of Stefan Batory captured the city.

== References and notes ==
=== Bibliography ===
- Januszkiewicz, A. (2013). Ливонская война 1558-1570 [Livonian War of 1558-1570] (in Russian). Moscow: Квадрига. ISBN 978-5-93165-332-7.
- Januszkiewicz, A. (2007). The Grand Duchy of Lithuania and the War of 1558-1570 (in Belarusian). Minsk.
- Filyushkin, Alexander (2015). Русско-Литовская 1561-1570 и Датско-Шведская 1563-1570 войны [The Russian-Lithuanian War of 1561-1570 and the Danish-Swedish War of 1563-1570] (PDF) (in Russian). St. Petersburg: Milhist.
- Karamzin, Nikolay (2020) [1824]. История Государства Российского [History of the Russian state]. Азбука. ISBN 978-5-4484-4482-1.
- Penskoi, Vitali (2018). Полоцкий поход 1562-1563 [Polotsk campaign 1562-1563] (in Russian). Warspot.
- Volokhdin, Dmitri (2009). Воеводы Ивана Грозного [Generals of Ivan the Terrible] (PDF) (in Russian). Вече.
- Egorshina, O.; Petrova, A. (2023). История русской армии [The history of the Russian Army] (in Russian). Moscow: Edition of the Russian Imperial Library. ISBN 978-5-699-42397-2.
- Kudryashev, Konstantin (2023). Полоцкое взятье [Polotsk capture] (in Russian). AIF.
- Velichko, Konstantin I.; Novitsky, Vasily F.; Schwarz, Alexey V. von; Apushkin, Vladimir A.; Schoultz, Gustav K. von (1915). Военная энциклопедия [Military Encyclopedia] (in Russian). Vol. XVIII:Паукер - Порт-Артур. Moscow: Типография Т-ва И. Д. Сытина.
- Filyushkin, Alexander (2018). Первое противостояние России и Европы [The first confrontation between Russia and Europe] (in Russian). Series: Что такое Россия? (What is Russia?). Новое литературное обозрение. ISBN 978-5-4448-1029-3.
- Penskoi, Vitaly (2021). "Центурионы" Ивана Грозного: Воеводы и головы Московского войска второй половины XVI века ["Centurions" of Ivan the Terrible: Voivodes and Heads of the Moscow army of the second half of the XVI century] (in Russian). Series: Новейшие исследования по истории России [The latest research on the history of Russia]. Moscow: Центрополиграф. ISBN 978-5-227-09581-7.
