= Battle of Iași =

Battle of Iași may refer to:

- Battle of Iași (1653)
- Battle of Iași (1717)
- First Jassy–Kishinev offensive, 8 April–6 June 1944, Soviet failure
- Second Jassy–Kishinev offensive, 20–29 August 1944, Soviet victory

== See also ==
- Battle of Iasi, now in Turkistan, Kazakhstan
