= Pomeranian expedition to Santok =

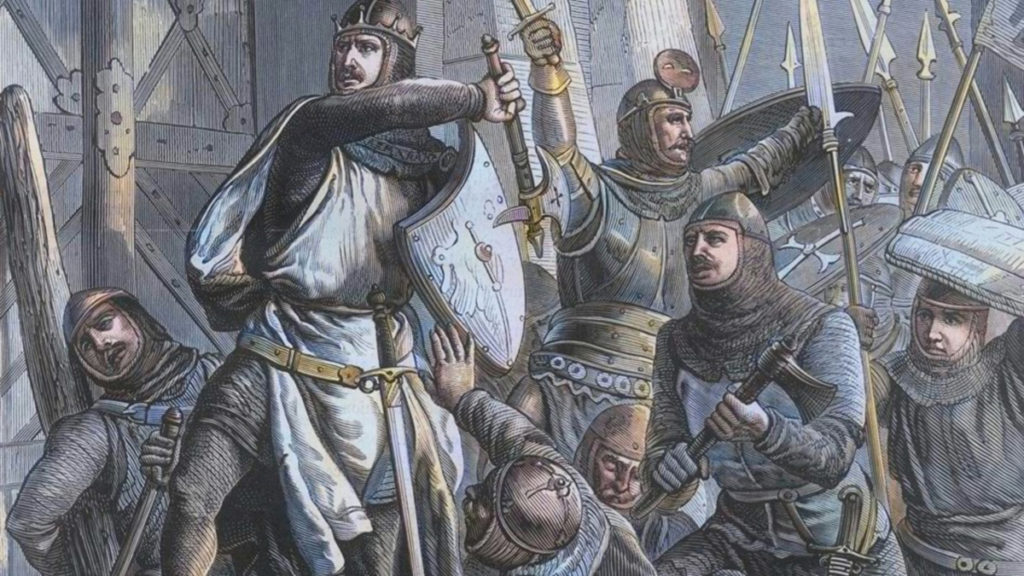
- Polish-Pomeranian fights
Date	1099
Location	Santok, Pomerania, Kingdom of Poland
Result	Polish victory
Territorial changes	Poland annexes Międzyrzecz

Belligerents
Kingdom of Poland	Western Pomerania

Commanders and leaders
Bolesław III Wrymouth; Władysław I Herman; Zbigniew of Poland	Świętobor

Strength
6,000	3,000

== Background ==
The Pomeranians, a fiercely independent and warlike people, had long been a thorn in the side of the Kingdom of Poland. Despite repeated failures in their attempts to conquer Polish territory, their desire to disrupt the peace and inflict harm on the Poles remained undiminished. In their latest endeavor, they set their sights on the Santok stronghold, a vital strategic point guarding the borders of the kingdom.

== War ==
Their initial approach was one of cunning and subterfuge, attempting to infiltrate Santok through deceit and bribery. When these tactics failed to yield the desired results, they resorted to open violence, launching a direct assault on the stronghold. However, the defenders of Santok, bolstered by a strong garrison and fortified defenses, repelled the attack with ease.

Undeterred by their initial setback, the Pomeranians refused to abandon their ambitions. Recognizing the strategic importance of Santok as a gateway to the heart of Poland, they began construction on a second stronghold nearby. Despite facing resistance from the local populace and the defenders of Santok, they persevered, utilizing timber, oak beams, and other materials found abundantly in the region to fortify their new position. The construction of the second stronghold proceeded with remarkable speed, driven by the Pomeranians' determination to expand their influence into Polish territory. Walls were raised, moats dug, and defenses erected, all with the aim of creating a formidable base from which to launch further incursions into Poland.

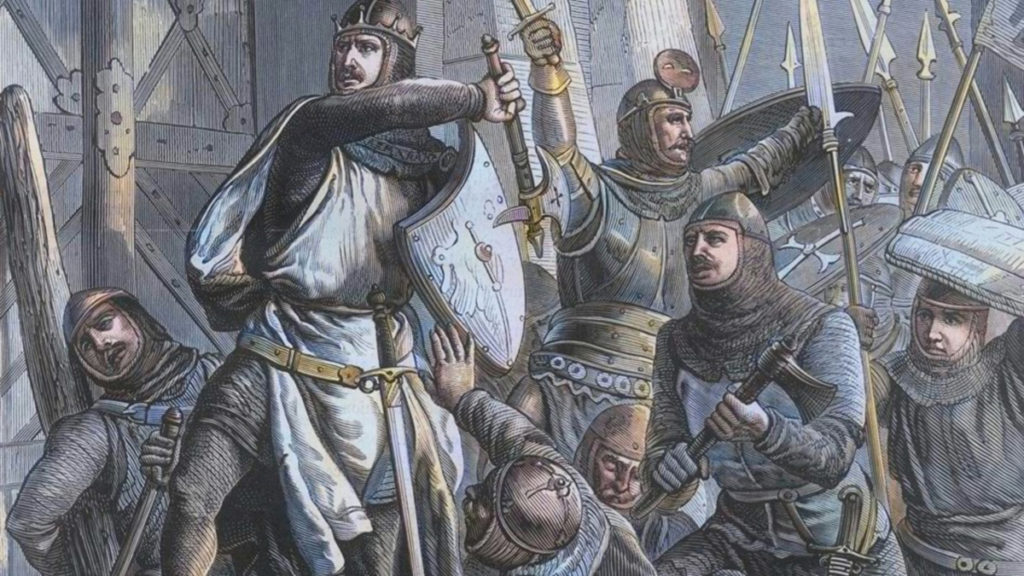
Polish-Pomeranian fights

Upon learning of the renewed Pomeranian threat, Prince Władysław of Poland wasted no time in mobilizing a response. He called upon his son, Zbigniew, to lead the defense of Santok and put an end to the Pomeranian aggression. However, Zbigniew's efforts proved inadequate, as his indecisiveness and lack of resolve only served to embolden the enemy. It was then that Bolesław III Wrymouth, the prince's other son, emerged as the true hero of the hour. Hearing of his brother's failure, he gathered a small but determined force and launched a daring counterattack against the Pomeranians. With skillful tactics and unwavering courage, Bolesław led his men to victory, routing the Pomeranian forces and reclaiming control of the region also annexing the stronghold of Międzyrzecz.

== Aftermath ==
The news of Bolesław's triumph spread quickly throughout the kingdom, earning him widespread acclaim and admiration. Even Prince Bretislav of Bohemia, Bolesław's maternal uncle, was impressed by his nephew's valor and sent messengers inviting him to his court. There, Bolesław was honored for his bravery and rewarded with the return of the Kamieniec Ząbkowici castle, a symbol of his newfound status as a hero of the realm. As Bolesław returned home, he did so not only as a conqueror but also as a symbol of hope and inspiration for his people. His decisive actions had not only repelled the Pomeranian threat but had also reaffirmed the strength and resilience of the Kingdom of Poland.

== See also ==
- Cuman raid on Poland (1101)
- Bolesław III Wrymouth
- Władysław I Herman
- Pomeranians (tribe)

== Sources ==
- Długosz Jan, Roczniki czyli kroniki sławnego królestwa Polskiego, vol 3 ISBN 978-83-01-16069-2
- Pietras Stanisław, Bolesław Krzywousty, Katowice, Wydawnictwo "Śląsk", 1978 ISBN 83-216-0261-4
- Kadłubek Wincenty, Chronica seu originale regum et principum Poloniae ISBN 978-83-04-04969-7
- Gallus Anonymous, Cronica et gesta ducum sive principum Polonorum, 1112-1116 ISBN 978-83-7153-139-2
