= Operation Eagle's Feather =

- Part of the War in Afghanistan (2001–2021)
Location	Afghanistan
Result	Polish victory

Belligerents
Poland; Afghan National Army	Taliban

Strength
800 Polish Army soldiers	Unknown

Casualties and losses
3 wounded and 3 damaged vehicles (Poland)	Unknown

Operation Eagle's Feather was a Polish Army operation, supported by the Afghan Armed Forces against the Taliban in 2009. The Polish Army targeted and attacked a number of weapons dumps and Taliban radio masts. This was the largest operation of the Polish Army during the War on Terror in Afghanistan. According to Gazeta Wyborcza, about 800 Polish soldiers were involved in the operation.

== Aftermath ==
During the operation, the weapons dumps and radio masts were successfully destroyed. Several of the Polish Army's vehicles were damaged and three Polish soldiers were wounded. The number of casualties received by the Taliban is unknown.

== See also ==
- Operation Achilles
- List of wars involving Poland
