= Battle of Treiden (1628) =

- Part of the Polish–Swedish War (1626–1629)
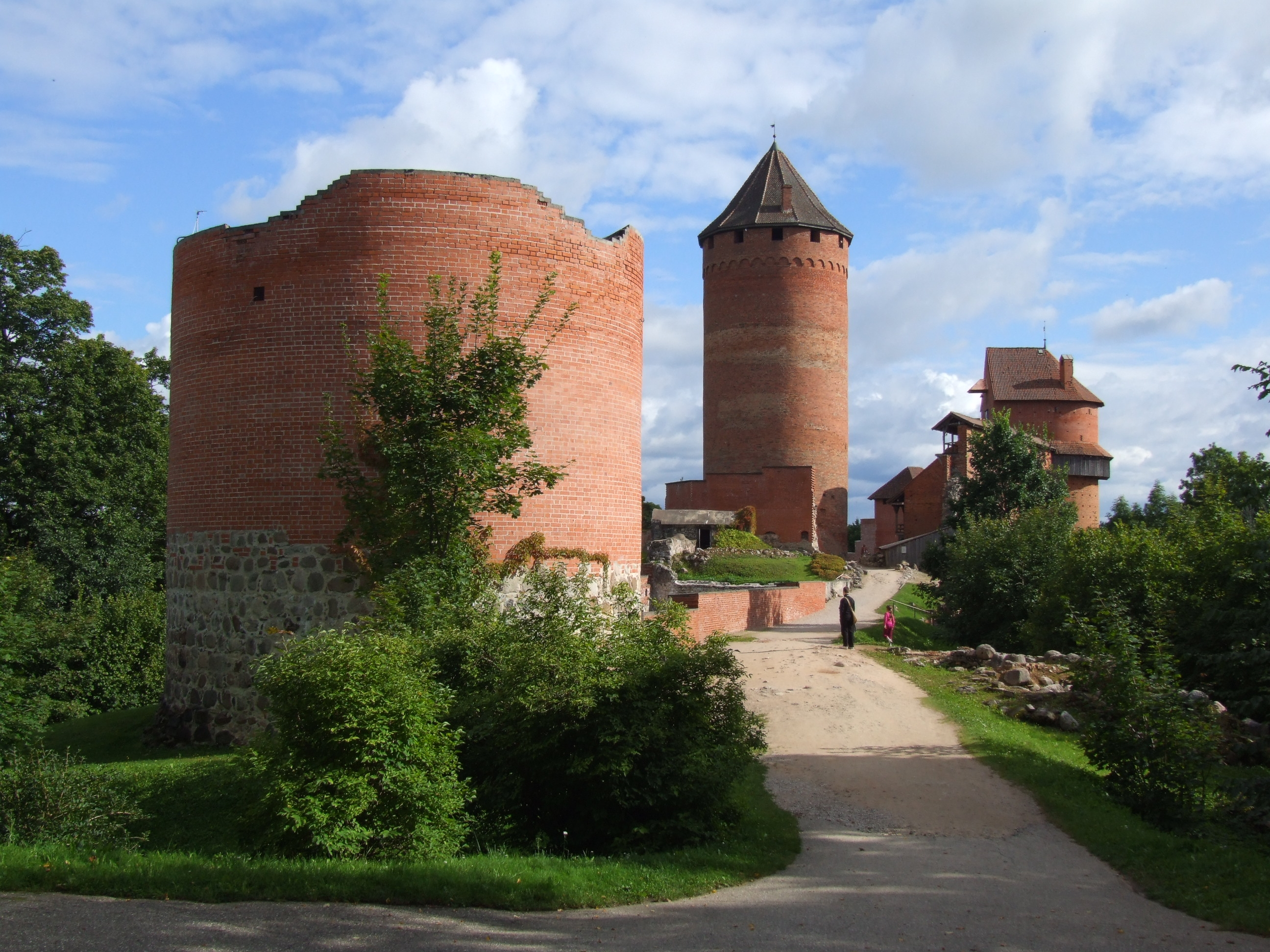
- Turaida Castle from it's north side
Date	February 1, 1628
Location	Treiden, Livonia (Turaida, Latvia) 57°11′00″N 24°51′00″E
Result	Polish–Lithuanian victory

Belligerents
Polish–Lithuanian Commonwealth	Swedish Empire

Commanders and leaders
(Polish–Lithuanian Commonwealth) Mikołaj Korff (Polish–Lithuanian Commonwealth) Konstanty Zienowicz	(Swedish Empire) Gustav Horn

Strength
200 infantry 600–700 cavalry	500 infantry 400 cavalry

Casualties and losses
20–40 killed	200–300 killed 2 banners

The Battle of Treiden was fought during the Polish–Swedish War (1626–1629), between Polish–Lithuanian Commonwealth and the Swedish Empire on February 1, 1628. Polish-Lithuanian Commonwealth forces under the command of Mikołaj Korff and Konstanty Zienowicz defeated the Swedish forces commanded by Gustav Horn.
