= Battle of Kushliki =

1661 battle

- Part of Russo-Polish War (1654–1667)
Date	4 November 1661
Location	Kushliki
Result	Polish–Lithuanian victory

Belligerents
Polish–Lithuanian Commonwealth	Russian Tsardom

Commanders and leaders
Stefan Czarniecki; John II Casimir; Kazimierz Żeromski	Ivan Khovansky; Afanasy Ordin-Nashchokin

Strength
24,000	12,000

Casualties and losses
Unknown	1,500 killed 400 captured

The Battle of Kushliki on 4 November 1661 between a Polish–Lithuanian force and a Russian Tsardom force was one of the battles of the Russo-Polish War (1654–67).

A Lithuanian force of about 14,000 under pułkownik Kazimierz Żeromski made a fortified camp on the right bank of Daugava River (near the village of Kushliki (Kuszliki) in Polotsk Voivodeship) and defeated the first assault of Ivan Andreyevich Khovansky on 24 September. Khovansky would retreat, only to return on 16 October with a larger army (12,000 people, 18 artillery pieces). On 3 November, a Polish relief force of about 14,000 under king John II Casimir of Poland and regimentarz Stefan Czarniecki arrived, and on 4 November surprised the Russian forces by assaulting their camp. The Russian army was defeated, and the Poles captured all of their artillery.
