= Piotr Wszeborycz =

Polish voivode during the 12th century

Piotr Wszeborycz, also known as Wszebor, was a Polish voivode, lord of Ciechanów, and the commander of Masovia. He lived in the 11th and 12th centuries.

== Reign ==
Based on information from the Kadłubek Chronicle, it is assumed that Wszebor held the office of voivode twice—once in the final phase of Bolesław Krzywousty's government (1125–1138), and the second time during the rule of Bolesław Kędzierzawy (after 1146). In 1089, as he was an experienced knight, Wszebor ruled Ciechanów Castle.

=== Bolesław II the Bold's Expedition to Kiev ===
Wszebor participated in Bolesław II the Bold's expedition to Kiev, during which he led the Polish army.

=== Attack on Wszebor's castle ===
Wszebor's daughter Hanna was considered exceptionally beautiful and was betrothed to Prince Mieczysław, the son of Bolesław the Bold, as a child. Hanna was in love with Prince Zbigniew, the son of Władysław I Herman. To prevent the will of Hanna and Mieczysław's parents from being fulfilled, the lovers agreed that a faithful German servant of Zbigniew, Mestwin, would secretly travel to Ciechanów castle at night to present Hanna with Zbigniew's ring, after which she would run away with him to Zbigniew, who was in Płock. Zbigniew, who was described as cunning, had thought out the kidnapping well. He decided to act on Midsummer's Eve, when the peasantry celebrated their Kupala Night feast in Modła near Ciechanów. On that day, Władysław Herman also had fun with his court in Ciechanów. In order to get the royal party and the castle knights out of the well-guarded castle, he improvised an attack on people from nearby settlements having fun in Modło.

Upon learning of the attack, murder of the population, and burning of settlements, the king, with his entourage, left for Płock, while Wszebor set off with his team to provide relief to Modła after saying goodbye to his daughter. The castle was deserted and silent. Tired people from the borough were sleeping in a row in the castle courtyard, where they had taken refuge when they heard about the threat. It was dark and muggy; there was a storm brewing.

When Wszebor eventually returned, he was deeply concerned about his daughter's fate and furious with the servants. He ordered her to be punished, sent search parties, and travelled to Płock himself through Raciąż, to the royal court to seek help.

=== Wszebor in Wrymouth's expedition to Ruthenia ===
Wszebor became infamous after escaping from the battlefield in 1136, taking with him half of the prince's army. It is known that after his return, the prince sent Wszebor a hare sheepskin, a distaff, and a rope, which was equivalent to a punishment of his dignity and fame.

=== Wszebor's attack ===
After Salomea of Berg's death (27 July 1144), the juniors Bolesław II the Bold and Mieszko III of Poland wanted to take over the widow's estate – contrary to their father's will, perhaps as a salary for the younger Henry. Władysław II appealed to Vsevolod II Olegovich for help. However, without waiting for Vsevolod II's soldiers to arrive, he sent his troops into battle.

Before the clash with his brothers took place, he was unexpectedly attacked by the Masovian Voivode, Wszebor. Władysław's inevitable defeat was prevented by reinforcements from Vsevolod, which arrived on time. A sort of accomplice (and perhaps the instigator) of this dangerous situation was Piotr Włostowic (Wszebor's brother), who, "guarding" the observance of Krzywousty's will, avoided unequivocally accepting the principal's side, and speaking in the language of reality: by giving his brothers a free hand, he took care of his own skin — after the removal of the juniors, because the senior prince would probably also want to get rid of the all-powerful palatine.

== Controversy ==
Kadłubek's view was recently questioned by J. Bieniak, who said that Kadłubek supposedly only knew that Wszebor held the office in question without any relatives' data on its chronology and clearly ignored this.

To support his assumption, he referred to the message of Carmen Mauri (preserved in both text versions, i.e., in the Polish-Silesian Chronicle and in the Chronicle about Komes Piotr), claiming that it clearly indicates that at the moment of death, Bolesław III Wrymouth was in the hands of Piotr Włostowic. He had probably assumed this position before 1132, since he played a role in the Battle of Sajó. Piotr's son, Wszebor II, became a special confidant of the monarch.

An additional reason for J. Bieniak to question the credibility of Kadłubek's account was his own findings on the subject. Wszebor from Piotr Włostowic. Bienak sees more precisely in Wszebór's eldest son, Piotr. He derives this affiliation only from indirect data, emphasizing that there is no expressis verbis of Wszebor's relationship with Piotr, which specifies no source. He rejects the emendation of the name Ceswborius to "Wseborius", accepted by some researchers, based on which Wszebor is recognized in the literature on the subject as Peter's cognatus.

== Death ==
It is unknown when Wszebor died, although it was a few months after his daughter Hanna died.

== See also ==
- List of Polish monarchs
