= Battle of Kozelsk =

1607 battle in Russia

- Part of Polish–Russian War (1605–1618)
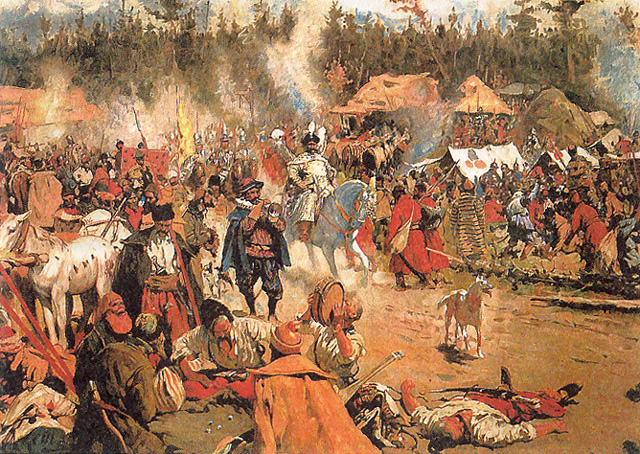
- Dmitry's camp at Tushino, by Sergey Ivanov.
Date	October 1607
Location	Kozelsk, Russia
Result	Rebel victory

Belligerents
False Dmitry II	Muscovite Tsardom

Commanders and leaders
Rebel "Hetman" Mehovetsky	Prince Vasily Litvinov-Mosalsky

Strength
About 3,000	Several hundred

Casualties and losses
Light	Heavy

The Battle of Kozelsk was the first victory of False Dmitry II against the government of Tsar Vasili IV Shiuski.

== Prelude ==
As the rebellion of Ivan Bolotnikov was coming to an end in central Russia, a new impostor, False Dmitry II, appeared on the Polish border, collecting Cossacks and Polish-Lithuanian mercenaries under his banner. By July 1607 he was recognized by the people of Starodub, Chernigov, Putivl, and Novgorod-Seversky.

== Battle ==
In September 1607, False Dmitry II left Starodub with some 3,000 men in order to relieve Bolotnikov, besieged in Tula. At Kozelsk, on October 8, 1607, the rebels won their first victory against the government troops of Vasili IV Shuiski.

== Aftermath ==
Despite the victory at Kozelsk, the capture of Tula on October 10 by Tsar Vasili made further efforts to relieve Bolotnikov meaningless. So the rebels besieged Bryansk in November 1607, where False Dmitry II was joined by 4.000 former Bolotnikov Cossacks, 3,000 Don Cossacks, and some 2,500 Polish mercenaries. Nevertheless, the rebels were defeated at Bryansk on December 25, 1607 by the government relief army.
