= Battle of Hillah (2003) =

2003 Battle in the Iraq War

Battle of Al Hillah (2003)
- Part of 2003 Invasion of Iraq
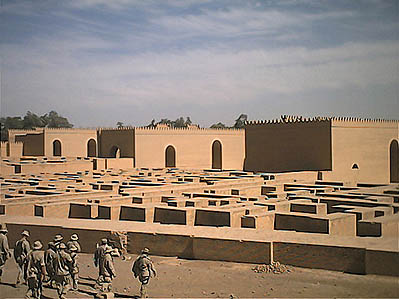
- US Marines in Al Hillah
Date	31 March – 2 April 2003
Location	Hillah, Iraq
Result	U.S. victory: Destruction of the Medina Division.

Belligerents
United States; United Kingdom; Poland	Iraq

Commanders and leaders
(United States) Joseph Anderson (United Kingdom) Brian Burridge	(Iraq) Unknown

Units involved
(United States) 10th Mountain Division (United States) 1st Marine Division (United States) 101st Airborne Division: (United States) 502nd Infantry Regiment; (United Kingdom) Royal Air Force (Poland) JW GROM	2nd Al Medina Armored Division

Strength
Tens of thousands	≈10,000

Casualties and losses
1 killed wounded unknown 8 attack helicopters damaged	1,200+ killed & wounded 2 field artillery batteries destroyed 1 AA battery destroyed 1 armoured company destroyed 1 infantry battalion destroyed
- 551 Iraqi civilian casualties (19 killed, 515 wounded, 17 unspecified)
- Civilian casualties resulted from heavy barrage by the 2nd Al Medina Armored Division on densely populated urban areas (Coalition forces were attempting to move through the area at the time of the attack)

The Battle of Al Hillah was an armed military confrontation between military elements of the United States and Iraq during the 2003 Invasion of Iraq. Prior to the Iraq War, the ancient city of Al Hillah was home to numerous bases for the Iraqi Medina division of the Iraqi Republican Guard. As a main objective of the invasion of Iraq was to disable the Republican Guard, this made Al Hillah an important target for Coalition forces, as well as the fact that Al Hillah lay in the path of the planned Coalition advance Najaf.

== The Battle ==
Fighting in Al Hillah began on 31 March 2003 when a platoon from the 101st US Airborne Division riding exposed on tanks from 2-70 Armor crossed into southern Al Hillah from Al Kifl, at approximately 0600 AST. There, US forces advanced along Highway 8, protected by air cover. At 0630, an American AH-64 came under fire from Iraqi soldiers entrenched in bunkers, and by 0640 American soldiers were engaged in combat with Iraqi infantry. What followed was intensely fierce urban combat as Coalition forces advanced into Al Hillah, under fire from Republican Guard soldiers and Iraqi infantry.

After nearly 15 minutes of intense gun battle, US ground units halted near the campus of Babylon Community College, where they exchanged small arms and artillery fire with two entrenched Republican Guard infantry battalions, two artillery batteries, and extensive air defense systems. For five hours, Coalition forces were engaged in close-combat fighting, at times so close that the American M1 Abrams tanks could not depress their machine guns low enough to engage Iraqi troops. As fighting raged, Apache helicopters (most of the United States Air Force, and some of the British Royal Air Force) conducted numerous attack runs and fire missions on Iraqi defenses until all their weaponry and nearly all their fuel had been expended. Eight Apaches returned to their base damaged, with repair teams reported to have been pulling unexploded RPGs out of the skins of the helicopters. Many pilots had been injured; one seriously injured pilot later received a Purple Heart for wounds sustained during the battle.

At 1730 hours AST, US Colonel Joseph Anderson ordered Coalition forces to withdraw. One US soldier had been killed in the battle, but the fighting had cost the Iraqis 1,200 or more soldiers killed or wounded, one Republican Guard infantry battalion, one armored company, two field artillery batteries, and one antiaircraft battery.

Following the withdrawal, Coalition aircraft launched an assault on the remaining defenses in Al Hillah. Numerous cluster bombs were dropped, causing military and civilian casualties. Following the bombing, Coalition forces advanced into Al Hillah and captured the city by the end of 1 April, encountering sparse resistance. With Al Hillah captured, Coalition forces were clear to advance towards Najaf.

== Aftermath ==
Small pockets of resistance, composed mostly of Iraqi irregulars, continued to hold out in Al Hillah until 11 April, but nearly all Iraqi military resistance in the city had been annihilated and the Republican Guard no longer posed a serious threat to Coalition forces.
