= Bolesław II the Bold's expedition to Kiev (1077) =

Bolesław II the Bold's Expedition to Kiev
- Part of Kievan succession crisis
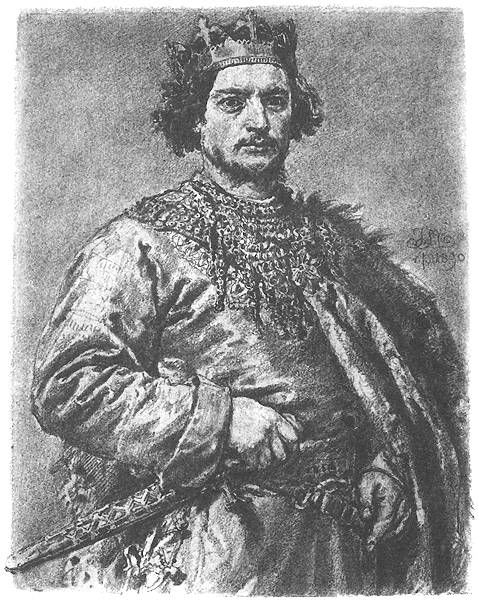
- Painting of Bolesław II the Bold by Jan Matejko
| Date | May – June 1077 |
| Location | Kievan Rus |
| Result | Polish victory: Iziaslav I put on the throne |
| Territorial changes | Cherven Cities annexed into Poland |

Belligerents
| Kingdom of Poland | Kievan Rus; Kiev; Chernigov |

Commanders and leaders
| Bolesław II the Bold; Iziaslav I | Vsevolod I of Kiev |

Bolesław II the Bold's expedition to Kiev (1077) (Note: Polish: Wyprawa Bolesława Szczodrego na Ruś (1077), Ukrainian: Похід Болеслава ІІ Сміливого на Русь (1077)) was an expedition from May–June 1077 undertaken by Bolesław II the Bold against Vsevolod I of Kiev to restore Iziaslav I of Kiev to the throne. It ended with a Polish success, with the Cherven Cities being annexed into Poland and Iziaslav I being put on the throne.

Iziaslav was expelled in 1073 by Sviatoslav and Vsevolod. He tried to convince Bolesław to help him regain the throne, although this request was denied, causing him to try and find help elsewhere. However, near the end of 1076, Sviatoslav, a Polish ally, had died. He was replaced by Vsevolod. Bolesław's relations with the Rus' then ceased, and he was now willing to help Iziaslav gain back the throne.

The expedition commenced in May 1077, and without resistance, Vsevolod agreed to enter into an agreement with Iziaslav and the approaching Polish forces. This led to Iziaslav being put on the throne with Sviatoslav to succeed him and giving Poland the Cherven Cities in exchange for the assistance provided by Bolesław.

== Background ==
=== Fight over the throne ===
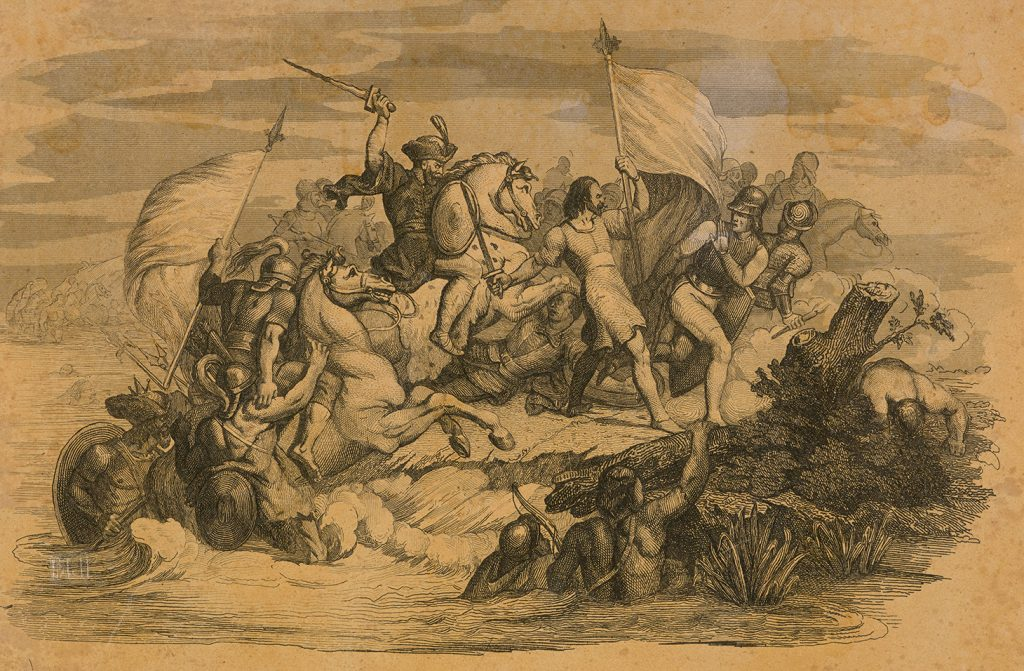
Bolesław the Bold with his team on a 19th-century French engraving

In 1068, Iziaslav I of Kiev had lost his throne after Vsevolod I of Kiev had succeeded in defeating him. After this, he was able to rely on Bolesław II the Bold in restoring himself to the throne. In 1069, Bolesław set off with Iziaslav and his sons Mstislav and Sviatopolk II of Kiev. This caused Vsevolod to escape to Polotsk without battle. This led to Bolesław entering Kiev with Ruthenian princes and spending the winter there. He then returned to Poland and in 1070 captured Przemyśl from other Ruthenian princes.

However, Sviatoslav II of Kiev tried to prevent this from re-occurring by intervening in Iziaslav's sphere of foreign relations and making direct contact with Bolesław, offering him the hand of his daughter and military aid against Bohemia in 1076. This led to Bolesław abandoning Iziaslav, and along with a general dislike of Iziaslav by the population, caused him to again be expelled by Sviatoslav and Vsevolod in 1073. (Note: It is possible this was also due to the possibility of a German-Polish War and the Czech threat.) Iziaslav went to Poland as usual, although he was not well-received, with Bolesław taking away part of (or all) his treasures and "ordering him to go away". As a result, Iziaslav went to Holy Roman Emperor Henry IV and Pope Gregory VII to complain. The emperor was bribed with treasures which led to misunderstandings with Bolesław and a demand to Sviatoslav to return Iziaslav to the throne, threatening to go on armed expedition, likely motivated by the idea of breaking the Polish–Russian alliance. The pope, supporting Iziaslav in the matter, sent a legate to Poland in 1075. This persuaded Bolesław to a new expedition to Ruthenia, with the intention of restoring Iziaslav to the throne. (Note: This is debated, with other sources saying that the papal letter to the Polish ruler did not mention anything about commanding Bolesław to organise an expedition in support of Iziaslav. It is also possible that the only demand was for Bolesław to return the money taken from Iziaslav.)

It is likely that Bolesław gave in under pressure of the Pope, and began preparing for an armed expedition to the Rus.

=== Consequences of Sviatoslav's death ===
On 27 December 1076, Sviatoslav died. This would cause Vsevolod to take power in Kiev on 1 January 1077. The third stay of Iziaslav his family and papal legates in Poland during the winter would prove to be successful for him, leading to the military expedition to Kiev after the crowning of Bolesław. This would lead to Iziaslav recovering his position as Prince of Kiev and his former relationship with Bolesław.

It is unknown why Bolesław's relations with Vsevolod ceased, although Tadeusz Grudziński claims that he failed to reach an agreement with Vsevolod, causing the previous alliance with Ruthenia to end. It is possible that this was due to Sviatoslav and Vsevolod being on poor terms with each other.

== Expedition ==
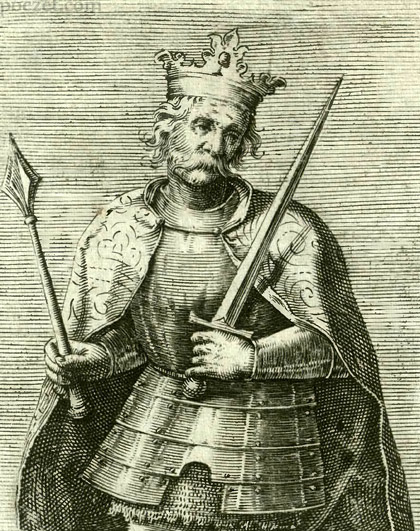
Bolesław II the Bold

Bolesław's final Russian expedition took place in May and June 1077, when Bolesław took an expedition in favour of Iziaslav, defeated Vsevolod, and for the third time placed Iziaslav on the throne. Without resistance and marching to them, Vsevolod had no choice but to enter into an agreement with Iziaslav and the Polish warriors, due to the possibility of internal conflicts after Sviatoslav's death.

The two sides met at Volhynia, near, Volodymyr where they concluded an agreement. It allowed Iziaslav to peacefully rule in Kiev again, and for Vsevolod to succeed him after death to ensure the succession system among the Iaroslavichi brand of the Volodimerovichi.

== Aftermath ==
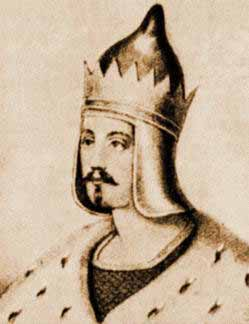
Iziaslav I of Kiev

On 15 July 1077, Iziaslav sat down on the throne of Kiev, while Vsevolod returned to his provincial principality. After 46 years of being under the rule of the Rus', Iziaslav gave up the Cherven Cities to Poland in exchange for the assistance provided. Once the expedition had concluded, Bolesław stayed in Kiev, before a rebellion had broken out in Poland. This was further fueled by the murder of Bishop of Krakow Stanislaus of Szczepanów. The rebellion led to the banishment of Bolesław in 1079.

On the other hand, Iziaslav also encountered internal difficulties in the Rus', causing discord to break out between Ruthenian princes, leading to the elimination of the Rus' from international politics for some time. Iziaslav enjoyed the title of grand prince for a very short time, as he died on 3 October 1078 in a battle on the Nezhatyna Nyva against Oleg Svyatoslavich while defending his brother Vsevolod's land. After Izaslav's death in the battle, Vsevolod took over the throne of Kiev.
