= Jan Stanisław Sapieha =

Grand Marshall of Lithuania from 1621 to 1635

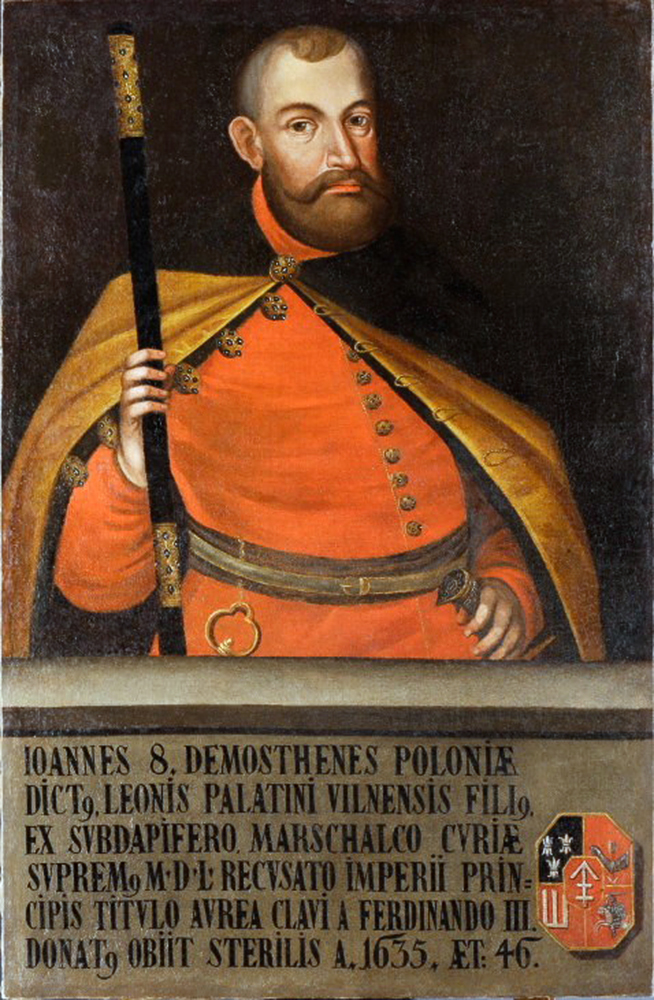
Jan Stanisław Sapieha, 1709

Jan Stanisław Sapieha (Lithuanian: Jonas Stanislovas Sapiega; 25 October 1589 in Maladziečna – 10 April 1635 in Lyakhavichy) was a Polish–Lithuanian noble, starost of Słonim, Court Marshal of Lithuania from 1617, Great Lithuanian Marshal from 1621.

He was the son of Lew Sapieha. Jan studied abroad. He was a friend and supporter of prince and later king Władysław IV Vasa and served as a deputy to many Sejms. Sapieha took part in the Polish-Swedish wars, but gained the reputation of a weak tactician and suffered several defeats. Near the end of his life he had mental health problems, but his friend king Władysław IV allowed him to remain at the royal court until his death.

== Sources ==
- "Сапеги" . Brockhaus and Efron Encyclopedic Dictionary (in Russian). 1906.
- "Сапега". Русский биографический словарь. Том XVIII. Сабанеев - Смыслов. Saint Petersburg: Тип. В. Демакова. 1094. pp. 200–202.
