= Mikołaj Korff =

Polish royal and military officer (died 1659)

Mikołaj Korff (died 1659) was a Polish royal and military officer, member of the noble Livionian Korff family. He was the son of Mikołaj, a rotmistrz in the army of King Stephen Báthory.

== Career ==
Mikołaj Korff began his military service as a commander of a reiter cavalry during the Polish-Swedish War of 1621–1625, under the command of Krzysztof Radziwiłł. Between October 16 and December 7, 1622, he led negotiations with the Swedes, which ended with the signing of a two-year truce. He received the Kreutzburg/Kryżborg estate for his services. After the conclusion of the truce in 1629, he went into the private service of Janusz Radziwiłł.

Next he took part in the Smolensk War (1633-1634), this time as an infantry commander, and was again on the truce commission. In 1634 he went on a diplomatic mission to King Christian IV of Denmark. Upon his return to Poland, he was given the castellany of Venden and the position of starosta of Kokenhaus. In 1643, he became the Voivode of Wenden. In 1646, he was on the treaty commission with Sweden.

From 1648 to 1651, he was in the ranks of the crown army, as commander of foreign-authority units. He took part in the fighting against the Khmelnytsky uprising until January 1, 1652. During this time he also took part in the Sejms of 1648 and 1649. On July 23, 1652, he was elected to a commission to fortify the fortress at Dyneburg. In 1654, King John II Casimir appointed him a member of the war council to the Lithuanian hetmans for the strengthening of the fortresses of the eastern borderlands of Lithuania.

He took part in the defense of the Smolensk fortress against the Moscow army, and protested the capitulation, ordered by Wilhelm Korff, his brother. Together with Janusz Radziwiłł, he signed the Kėdainiai Agreement of October 20, 1655, placing the Grand Duchy of Lithuania under the protection of Charles V Gustav, King of Sweden.

Mikołaj Korff died in 1659. He was married with Gertruda von Rosen, and has two sons: Walter, ciwun of Troki, and Ernest Jan, a major general in the Crown army, and daughter Anna Katarzyna, married to Gebhard Müllenheim, Court Master of the Hunt of Władysław IV.
