= Battle of Reisen =

- Part of the Prussian Crusade
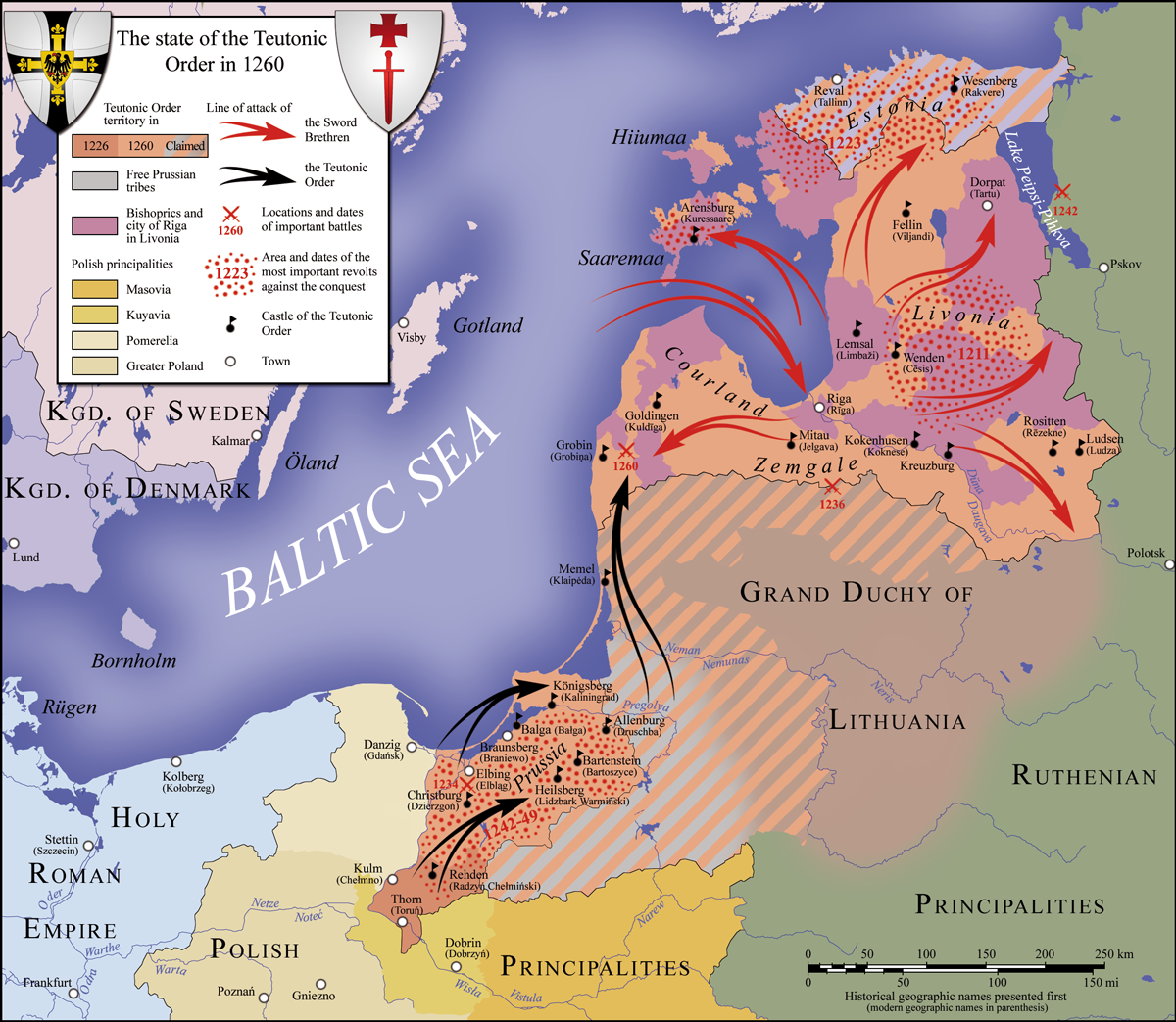
- Military activities of the Teutonic Knights in the 13th century
Date	Winter 1233–1234
Location	Near Sirgune
Result	Crusader victory

Belligerents
Pomesanians	Teutonic Knights; Duchy of Pomerelia; Duchy of Masovia; Duchy of Silesia; Duchy of Greater Poland

Commanders and leaders
Pepin of Pomesania	Hermann von Balk; Swantopolk the Great; Conrad of Masovia; Henry the Bearded; Ladislaus Odonic

Casualties and losses
5,000+	Minimal

The Battle of Reisen, Battle of Sorge River or Battle of Sirgune River took place in 1233–34 between the Teutonic knights and the Pomesanians in the Prussian crusade. The Teutonic Knights, along with some crusaders, defeated the Old Prussians, which allowed them to continue further fortress constructions in the region of Sirgune. According to the chronicle, Swantopolk the Great had planned for the Prussian attack, and when they met their enemy at Sirgune, he set up roadblocks on the undergrowths behind the Prussians, and when the Prussians retreated, the crusaders destroyed them.
