= Battle of Listenhoff =

- Part of the Polish–Swedish War (1621–1625)
Date	October 12, 1625
Location	Listenhoff, Livonia (Līksna Parish, Latvia) 55°59′N 26°24′E
Result	Polish–Lithuanian victory

Belligerents
Polish–Lithuanian Commonwealth	(yes) Swedish Empire

Commanders and leaders
Aleksander Gosiewski	(yes) Gustav Horn

The Battle of Listenhoff was fought during the Polish–Swedish War (1621–1625), between Polish–Lithuanian Commonwealth and the Swedish Empire on October 12, 1625. Polish-Lithuanian Commonwealth forces under the command of Aleksander Gosiewski defeated the Swedish forces commanded by Gustav Horn.
