= Kazimierz Żeromski =

Kazimierz Chwalibów Żeromski
- Died: 1662
- Military career
- Branch: Army
- Rank: Pułkownik
- Commands: Lithuanian forces during the Battle of Kushliki
- Conflicts: Battle of Kushliki

Kazimierz Chwalibów Żeromski (died 1662) was Pułkownik of Lithuanian forces during the Battle of Kushliki, where he defeated the first assault of Prince Ivan Andreyevich Khovansky.
