= Battle of Ryn =

The Battle of Ryn was a skirmish between Teutonic Knights and Masurian peasantry, which took place on January 30, 1456, near the town of Ryn (German: Rhein in Ostpreussen), State of the Teutonic Order, during the Thirteen Years' War.

In late 1455, peasants from eastern Masuria rebelled against high taxes, imposed by the Teutonic Knights. The Ryn castle was besieged and captured by the peasants, who killed most of its defenders. In response, the knights sent to Ryn a detachment from Olsztyn (Allenstein) and Barczewo (Wartenburg in Ostpreussen). Teutonic forces took their revenge on the peasants, destroying them in a battle on January 30, 1456. App. 500 peasants were killed, and 19 were captured.
