= Battle of Cernăuți (1506) =

Part of the Moldavian-Polish War (1506)

- Part of Moldavian–Polish War (1502–1510)
Date	August 1506
Location	Cernăuți, Moldavia (now Chernivtsi, Ukraine)
Result	Polish victory

Belligerents
Kingdom of Poland	Moldavia

Commanders and leaders
Mikołaj Kamieniecki	Unknown

Strength
3,000 soldiers	A few thousand soldiers

The Battle of Cernăuți was a battle fought during the Polish-Moldavian War (1502–1510) for Pokuttia. First Great Hetman of the Crown Mikołaj Kamieniecki leading 3,000 men drove the Moldavian forces to Pokuttia and defeated a Moldovan army of a few thousand at Cernăuți. This expedition did not end the conflict with Moldavia.

== Bibliography ==
- Bitwy polskie. Leksykon (Polish battles. Lexicon) Wydawnictwo Znak 1999 (Znak Publishing House 1999)
- Bitwa pod Czerniowcami (sierpień 1506)
