= Battle of Turkistan (1582) =

Part of the Kazakh-Uzbek Wars in 1582

- Part of the Kazakh–Uzbek Wars
Date	1582
Location	Turkistan, Kazakhstan 43°18′07″N 68°16′09″E
Result	Kazakh victory

Belligerents
Kazakh Khanate	(Khanate of Bukhara) Tashkent Rebels

Commanders and leaders
(Kazakh Khanate) Tawakkul Khan	(Khanate of Bukhara) Baba Sultan (Khanate of Bukhara) Abd al-Latif (surrendered)
- Location of the Battle in Modern day Kazakhstan

The Battle of Turkistan was a military battle between the Kazakh Khanate led by Tauekel and the Khanate of Bukhara led by the Shaybanid Baba Sultan.

In 1582, Abdullah Khan launched another campaign to Ulytau Range to finally deal with Baba Sultan and his supporters. This time, the military campaign was successful. Among the participants was Shigai Khan, for whom this campaign became his last. Fleeing persecution, Baba Sultan sought refuge with the Nogais. However, he soon devised a plot to kill the local murzas and seize their lands. His plans were uncovered, forcing him to flee once again. His next destination was Turkistan, where he aimed to resume the struggle for control over the city of Tashkent. Later on the Summer of 1582, Tauekel completely defeated Baba Sultan's army and personally delivered the fatal blow. As a symbol of victory, he severed his enemy's head and threw it at the feet of Abdallah Khan.

Even before this, Tauekel had managed to capture Baba Sultan's brother, Taiyr Sultan, whom Abdallah Khan's supporters had struggled to apprehend. Later, he also took Baba Sultan's son, Latif, prisoner. By the order of the Bukharan Khan, both were executed, this removed the threat of Baba Sultan's supporters' return to power.
