= Cuman raid on Poland (1101) =

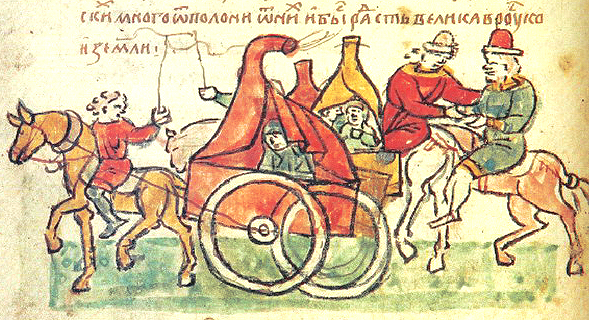
- Cuman representation in the Radziwiłł Chronicle
Date	1101
Location	Kingdom of Poland
Result	Polish victory

Belligerents
Duchy of Poland	Cumania

Commanders and leaders
Bolesław III Wrymouth	Unknown

Strength
Unknown	Unknown

The Cuman raid on Poland in 1101 (Note: Najazd Połowców na Polskę w 1101 roku) was a plundering expedition of nomads living in the Pontic steppes, known by the Slavs as the Polovtsians. The Cumans crossed the Vistula river in 1101 in three places after which they began to ravage the area, but they were defeated in battle by Bolesław III Wrymouth which forced them to retreat.

== Background ==
Prior to the invasion, Bolesław was currently involved in wars against the Pomeranians. The Pomeranians, frightened by Boleslaw, began to besiege Santok, but none of the magnates dared to move to relief, as they were all terribly afraid. Then Boleslaw, against his father's wishes and the objections of many, set out to help the besieged city and with a handful of knights won a great victory. The triumph was great, so Boleslaw's father knighted him, which can be dated to August 15, 1100 or 1101. It also happened that at the meeting during the knighting ceremony someone said words that might suggest the Cuman invasion:

"Bolesław, a young noble recently knighted in a grand ceremony, felt a sense of duty descending upon him as God's providence guided his path. It was during these formative moments that he received a divine calling, foreshadowing the trials that awaited him in the days ahead. Little did he know that his newly acquired knighthood would soon be put to the ultimate test."

— Gallus Anonymous, Cronica et gesta ducum sive principum Polonorum, pp. 43

== Raid ==
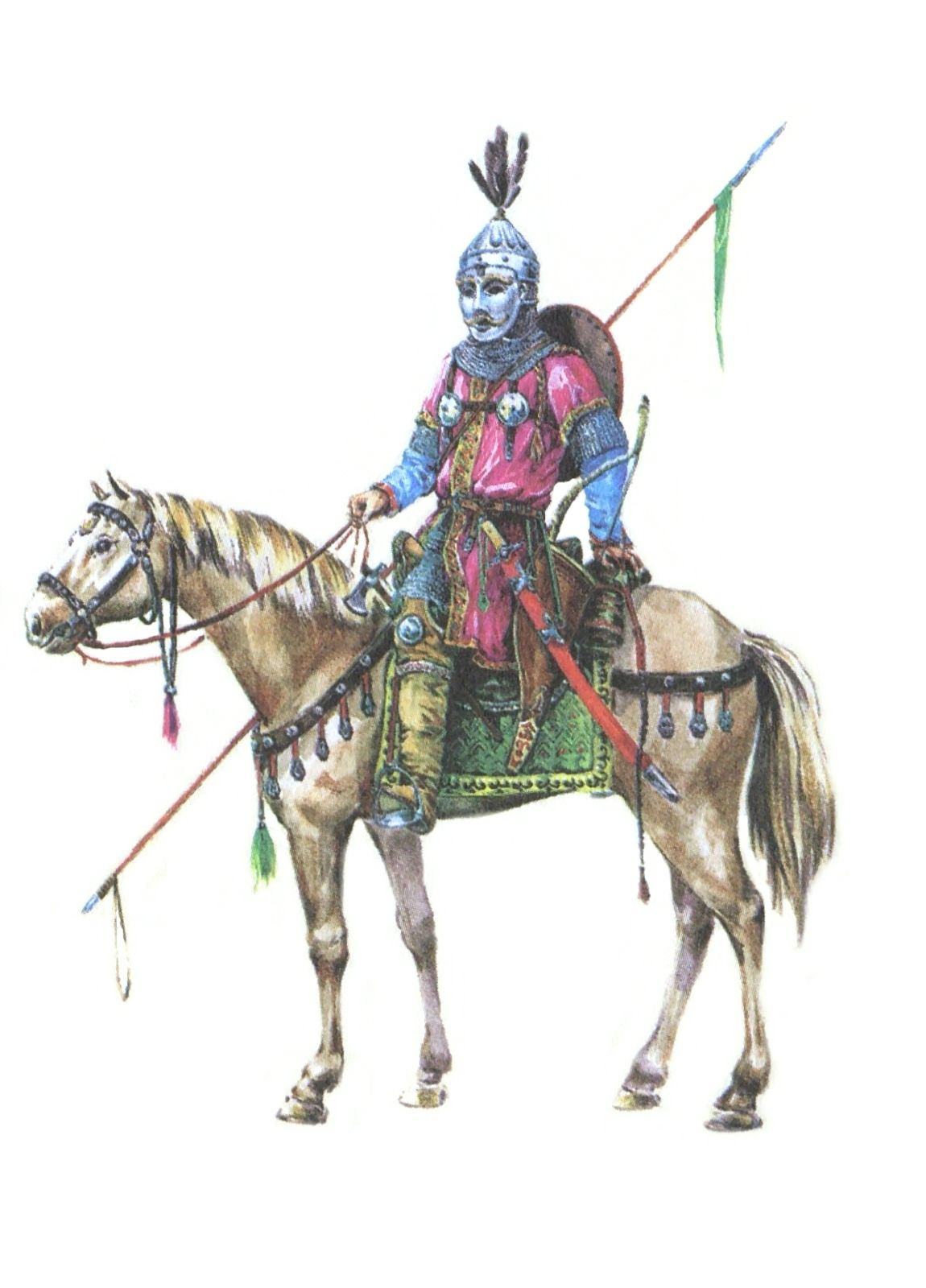
Depiction of a Cuman warrior

Shortly after Bolesław's knighting, the lands of Poland were plunged into chaos as the Cumans, a fierce nomadic tribe, who just crossed the Vistula River with wrathful fury in three places to loot. The Cumans, known for their swift and brutal raids, swiftly mobilized their forces, intent on spreading terror and destruction throughout the realm.

Under the cover of night, the Cumans launched their assault, crossing the Vistula River in small but formidable groups. (Note: Jan Długosz confused the Cumans with the Ruthenians in his chronicle.) As dawn broke, the unsuspecting Polish villages were engulfed in flames, their inhabitants falling victim to the merciless onslaught. The Cumans, ransacked homes and farms, leaving behind a trail of devastation in their wake.

Despite their fierceness, the Cumans soon encountered unexpected resistance. The small group of brave warriors who stood against the wave of invaders, led by Boleslaw III Wrymouth, fought with courage, determined to defend their homeland. In a decisive battle that followed, the Cumans suffered a crushing defeat, their forces scattered and broken before Bolesław's army. (Note: Jan Długosz confused the Cumans with the Ruthenians in his chronicle.)

== Aftermath ==
From that day on, the Cumans had to contend with the force of Bolesław's rule. Although they still posed a threat to the kingdom, they were never again able to strike with the same ferocity as before. And so, under the eye of the king, Poland stood stronger than it had previously in the face of the dangers that previously acted as major threats to security.

== See also ==
- Cumania
- Cumans
- Bolesław III Wrymouth

== Sources ==
- Gallus Anonymous, Cronica et gesta ducum sive principum Polonorum, 1112-1116 ISBN 9788371531392
- Pietras Stanisław, Bolesław Krzywousty, Katowice, Wydawnictwo "Śląsk", 1978 ISBN 8321602614
- Kadłubek Wincenty, Chronica seu originale regum et principum Poloniae ISBN 9788304049697
- Długosz Jan, Roczniki czyli kroniki sławnego królestwa Polskiego ISBN 9788301160692
