= Battle of Nevel =

- Part of the Livonian War
Date	August 19, 1562
Location	Nevel, in modern Russia
Result	See result

Belligerents
Kingdom of Poland	Tsardom of Russia

Commanders and leaders
Stanisław Leśniowolski	Andrey Kurbsky

Strength
1,500–4,000 men	15,000–25,000

Casualties and losses
15 soldiers	1,500–8,000 soldiers

The Battle of Nevel was fought during the Livonian War between the Kingdom of Poland and the Tsardom of Russia on August 19, 1562.

After Russian forces took Nevel, Polish forces undertook a pillaging raid into the new Russian-held territory. A bigger Russian detachment led by Andrey Kurbsky could not defeat the retreating Polish detachment under the command of Stanisław Leśniowolski.

Modern Polish researches estimating the number of Russians as 25,000. According to the Russian military historian Alexander Filyushkin, this is practically a half of the overall Russian military forces of Ivan the Terrible. He also considers that the battle was massively exaggerated for political reasons in the Polish-Lithuanian chronicles. The Russian losses caused by a 1,500 men strong Lithuanian force grew to over 8,000 while the overall strength of the Russian army was described as 40,000 people.

== Result ==
In modern historiography, the assessment of events is interpreted in different ways, for example, Alexander Filyushkin (2012) and Vitaly Penskoi (2018) believe that the battle ended in a draw. Another opinion is expressed by Polish sources, who assess the battle as a defensive polish victory.
