= Skarbimir's rebellion =

Skarbimir's rebellion (1117)
- Skarbimir's coat of arms
Date	1117
Location	Kingdom of Poland
Result	Bolesław III Wrymouth's victory

Belligerents
Kingdom of Poland	Rebels

Commanders and leaders
Bolesław III Wrymouth	Skarbimir

Strength
Unknown	Unknown

The Skarbimir Rebellion was a brief conflict between the rebellious Skarbimir and King Boleslaw III Wrymouth of Poland. The conflict ended with Skarbimir's defeat and his blinding at the behest of Boleslaw.

== Background ==
Skarbimir and his father are believed to have accompanied King Bolesław II the Bold, who was exiled to Hungary, in 1079. Michael the Old and Skarbimir were to return to Poland in 1086 with Mieszko Bolesławowic, Bolesław's son. After Mieszko's death, poisoned in 1089, the Awdans stood in opposition to the palatine Sieciech.

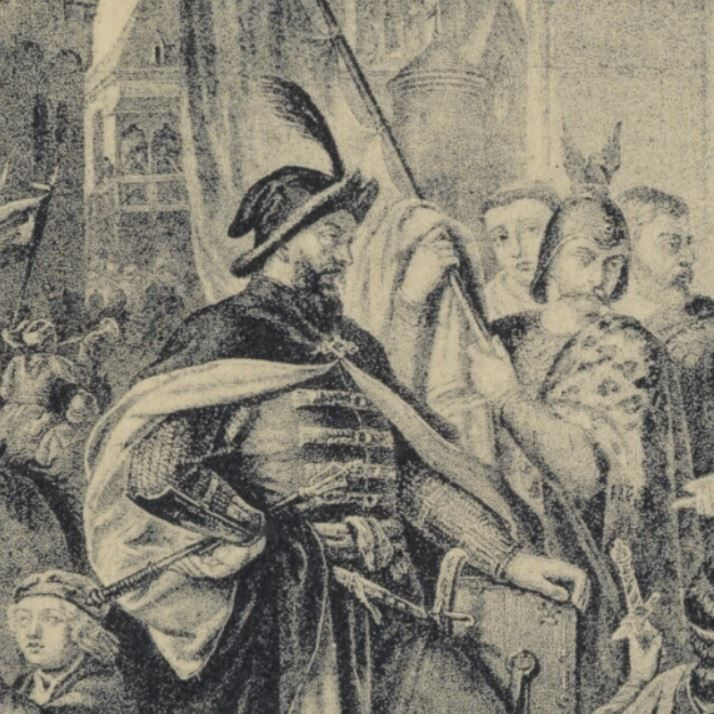
Palatine Sieciech

He was already politically active during the reign of Władysław I Herman. On his initiative, an agreement was reached between Bolesław and his brother Zbigniew, and a rally was called in Wrocław. There he administered the oath of office to both of Wladyslaw Herman's sons, approved the removal from office of Wojslaw, guardian of the younger Boleslaw, and decided to organize an expedition against the palatine Sieciech, who had real power in the state. As a result, Skarbimir became Bolesław's chief advisor, and after the death of Wladyslaw Herman he took the office of palatine in the Duchy of Lesser Poland-Silesia.

== Rebellion ==
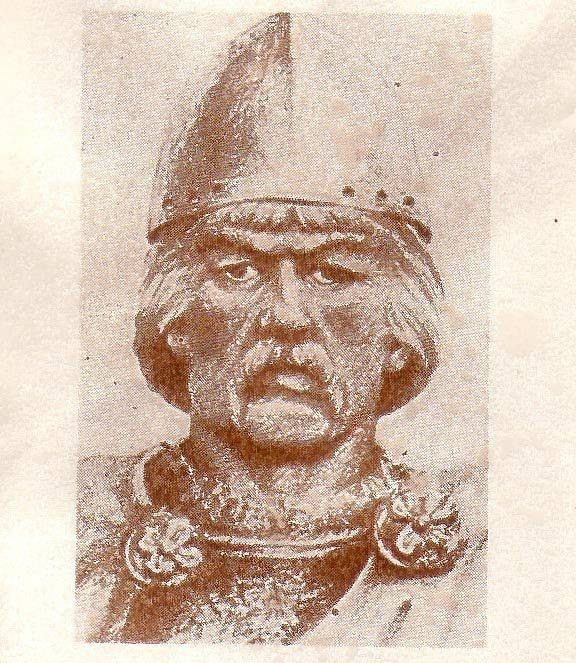
Bolesław III Wrymouth

In 1103, on behalf of Bolesław III Wrymouth, he negotiated with the Bohemian prince Bořivoj II, who - acting as Zbigniew's ally - invaded Silesia together with Sviatopelk. Skarbimir supported the anti-Bohemian policy, probably with his participation an expedition was organized against the southern neighbor in 1105. He had a lot of influence and even minted his own coin. According to Jan Długosz, the duke appointed him voivode of Kraków in 1106. He remained a faithful servant of Duke Bolesław III Wrymouth until 1117, when, under unexplained circumstances, he spoke out against Boleslaw, for which he was punished by blinding.

This rebellion is sometimes linked by historians to the succession law of Bolesław III Wrymouth. The problem with the succession rule arose in 1115, when Leszek, the first son of Bolesław III Wrymouth from his second marriage, was born. Skarbimir was said to be opposed to the statutory regulation of succession and believed that the choice of the successor to the throne should be decided by the elite of the nobility. He probably refused to take an oath of allegiance to the provisions of the statute, which led to his removal from office. The Palatine was then to start a war with the prince. He did not obtain allies in it and was defeated. Such an explanation of the background of the revolt is only a hypothesis due to the lack of source material.

== Aftermath ==
At the end of 1121, Piotr Włostowic was deprived of the dignity of palatine, which was again assumed by Skarbimir. His return to the forefront of Polish magnates is confirmed by the fact that he opens the list of secular dignitaries on the document of the legate Gilo of Toucy (issued between 1123 and 1125).

== See also ==
- Skarbimir
- Bolesław III Wrymouth
- Zbigniew
- List of wars involving Poland
