= Bolesław III Wrymouth =

Duke of Poland from 1107 to 1138

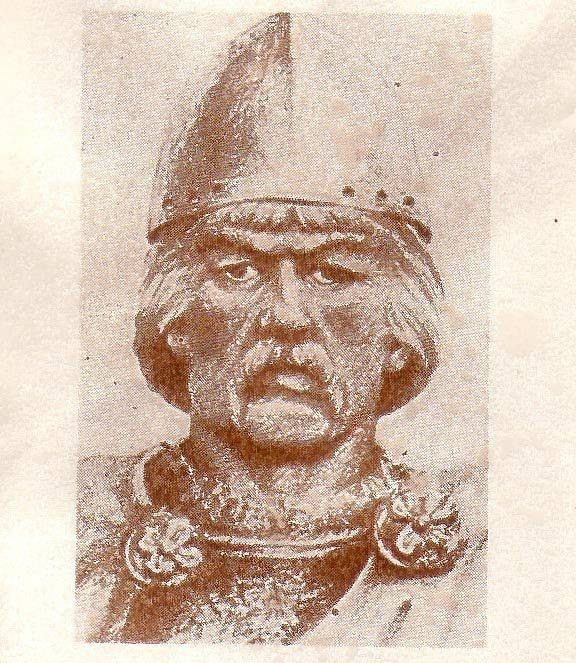
- A facial reconstruction based on Bolesław's remains, 1972

Duke of Poland
- Reign: 1107 – 1138
- Predecessor: Władysław I Herman
- Successor: Władysław II the Exile
- Born: 20 August 1086; Płock, Poland
- Died: 28 October 1138 (aged 52); Sochaczew, Poland
- Burial: Masovian Blessed Virgin Mary Cathedral, Płock, Poland
- Wives: Zbyslava of Kiev; Salomea of Berg
- Issue more...: Władysław II the Exile; Richeza; Bolesław IV the Curly; Mieszko III the Old; Dobroniega Ludgarda; Judith; Henry; Agnes; Casimir II the Just
- House: Piast
- Father: Władysław I Herman
- Mother: Judith of Bohemia
- Religion: Roman Catholic

Bolesław III Wrymouth (Polish: Bolesław III Krzywousty; 20 August 1086 – 28 October 1138), also known as Boleslaus the Wry-mouthed, was the duke of Lesser Poland, Silesia and Sandomierz between 1102 and 1107 and over the whole of Poland between 1107 and 1138. He was the only child of Duke Władysław I Herman and his first wife, Judith of Bohemia.

Bolesław began to rule in the last decade of the 11th century, when the central government in Poland was significantly weakened. Władysław I Herman fell under the political dependence of the Count palatine Sieciech, who became the de facto ruler of the country. Backed by their father, Boleslaw and his half-brother Zbigniew finally expelled Sieciech from the country in 1101, after several years of fighting. After the death of Władysław I Herman in 1102, two independent states were created, ruled by Bolesław and Zbigniew.

Bolesław sought to gain Pomerania, which caused an armed conflict between the brothers, and forced Zbigniew to flee the country and seek military help from King Henry V of Germany. Bolesław punished Zbigniew by blinding him. This action caused outrage among supporters of Zbigniew, resulting in a political crisis in Poland. Bolesław once again gained the favor of his subjects with public penance and made a pilgrimage to the monastery of his patron, Saint Giles, in Hungary.

Bolesław, like Bolesław II the Generous, based his foreign policy on maintaining good relations with neighboring Hungary and Kievan Rus, with whom he forged strong links through marriage and military cooperation in order to break Poland's political dependence on Germany and Henry's vassal, the King of Bohemia, who in moments of weakness of Polish policy was forced to pay tribute in Silesia. These alliances had allowed Bolesław to effectively defend the country from invasion in 1109. Several years later, Bolesław skillfully took advantage of the dynastic disputes in Bohemia to ensure peace on the south-west border.

Bolesław devoted the second half of his rule to the conquest of Pomerania. In 1113, he conquered the northern cities along Noteć, which strengthened the border with the Pomeranians. In subsequent years, he took further steps toward the conquest of Pomerania. The resolution of the conflict with the Holy Roman Empire allowed Bolesław to subordinate Western Pomerania and incorporate Gdańsk Pomerania. The expeditions, carried out in three stages, ended in the 1120s with military and political successes. Integration of the newly annexed lands enabled Bolesław to build churches and begin the process of converting Pomerania. Bishop Otto of Bamberg confirmed the Christianization of Pomerania from 1123 onward.

In the 1130s, Bolesław participated in the dynastic dispute in Hungary. After an unexpected defeat, he was forced to make an agreement with Germany. The Congress of Merseburg of 1135 addressed the issues of Pomerania, Silesian (probably also Polish) sovereignty and the supremacy of the Archbishopric of Magdeburg over the Polish Church.

Bolesław was married twice. His first marriage, to the Kievan princess Zbyslava, gave him an excuse to intervene militarily in the internal affairs of Rus'. After her death, Bolesław married a German noblewoman, Salomea of Berg, which in some way was the cause of changes in Polish foreign policy: in the second half of his rule, the duke sought to restore diplomatic relations with his western neighbor. His last, and perhaps most momentous act, was his will and testament known as "The Succession Statute" in which he divided the country among his sons, leading to almost 200 years of feudal fragmentation of the Polish Kingdom.

Bolesław III Wrymouth has been recognized by historiography as a symbol of Polish political aspirations until well into the 19th century. He also upheld the independence of the Polish archbishopric of Gniezno, despite a temporary failure in the 1130s. Although he achieved undoubted successes, he committed serious political errors, most notably against Zbigniew of Poland, his half-brother. The crime against Zbigniew and his penance for it show Bolesław's great ambition as well as his ability to find political compromise.

== Childhood ==
=== Situation of Poland during the 1080s ===
In 1086, the coronation of Vratislav II as King of Bohemia, and his alignment with László I, King of Hungary, threatened the position of the Polish ruler, duke Władysław I Herman. Therefore, that same year Władysław I was forced to recall from Hungarian banishment the only son of Bolesław II the Bold and a rightful heir to the Polish throne, Mieszko Bolesławowic. Upon his return, young Bolesławowic accepted the over-lordship of his uncle and gave up his hereditary claim to the crown of Poland in exchange for becoming first in line to succeed him. In return, Władysław I Herman granted his nephew the district of Kraków. The situation was further complicated for Władysław I Herman by a lack of a legitimate male heir, as his first-born son Zbigniew came from a union not recognized by the church. With the return of Mieszko Bolesławowic to Poland, Władysław I normalized his relations with the kingdom of Hungary as well as Kievan Rus (the marriage of Mieszko Bolesławowic to a Kievan princess was arranged in 1088). These actions allowed Herman to strengthen his authority and alleviate further tensions in international affairs.

=== Birth and naming ===
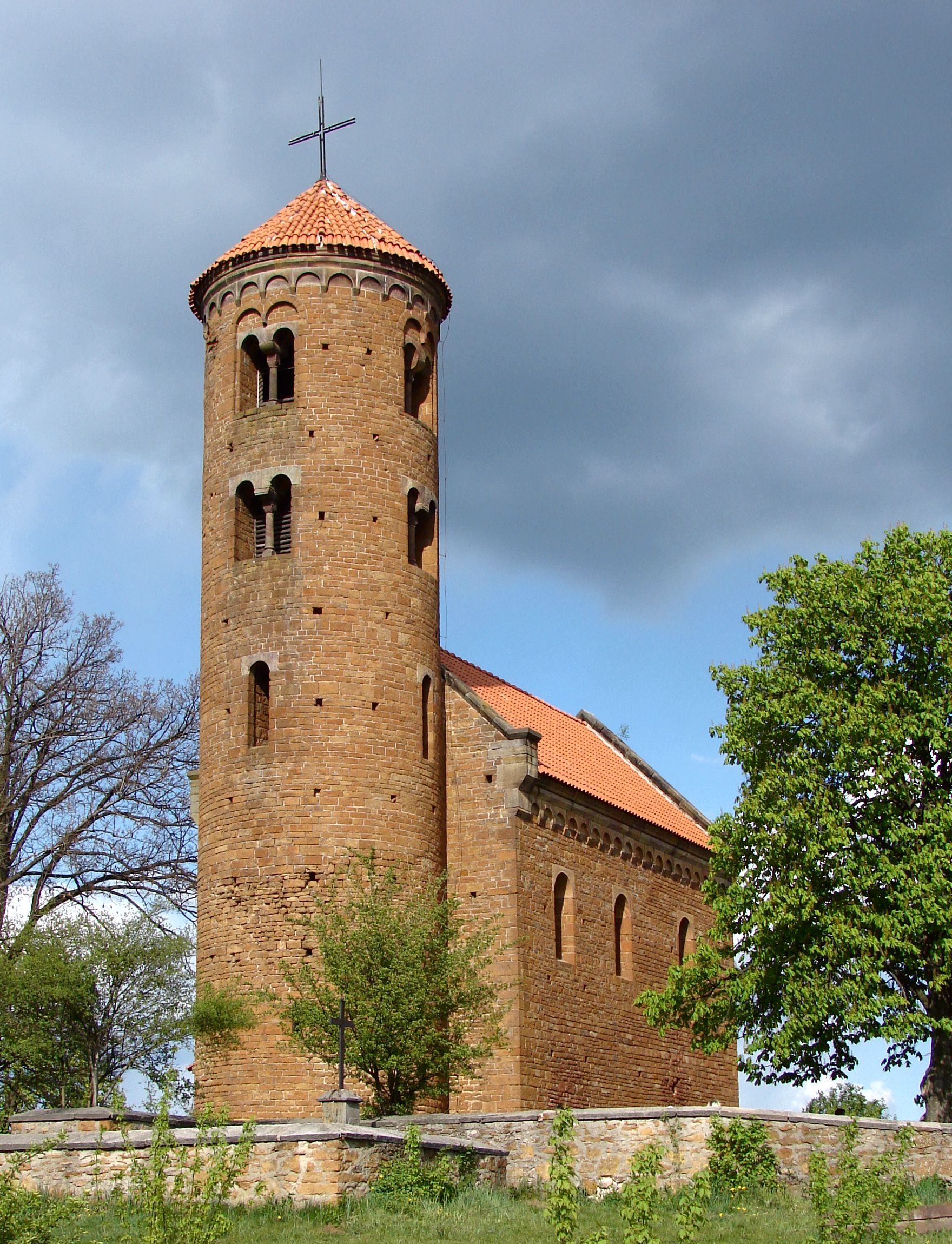
St. Giles's Church in Inowłódz, erected in 1138 through the endowment of Bolesław the Wrymouthed

The lack of a legitimate heir, however, remained a concern for Władysław I and in 1085 he and his wife Judith of Bohemia sent rich gifts, among which was a life size statue of a child made of gold, to the Benedictine Sanctuary of Saint Giles in Saint-Gilles, Provence begging for offspring. The Polish envoys were led by the personal chaplain of Duchess Judith, Piotr.

The date of birth of Bolesław is closely linked with the death of his mother, Judith. This fact is evidenced by contemporary sources:

- Gallus Anonymus in the Cronicae et gesta ducum sive principum Polonorum reported that Duchess Judith gave birth to Bolesław on the day of Saint Stephen, King of Hungary (whose feast since the 11th century was celebrated on 20 August). However, the Duchess's health never recovered from childbirth and she died on "the night of Nativity" (i.e., 24–25 December). Gallus did not note the year in his chronicle;
- Cosmas of Prague wrote in Latin in his Chronica Boëmorum ("Chronicle of Bohemians") that Bolesław was born three days before the death of Judith, who died on the VIII Calends of January (25 December) of 1085;
- The Kalendarz krakowski said that Duchess Judith died on 24 December 1086, and only indicated that the birth of Bolesław was in the same year;
- The Obituary of the Abbey of Saint-Gilles reported the death of Judith on 24 December 1086;
- The Rocznik kapituły krakowskiej (closely related to the Kalendarz krakowski) placed the death of Judith on 24 December 1086.

Historian August Bielowski established Bolesław's birth on 26 December 1085 and the death of his mother two days later, on 28 December. According to him, Gallus Anonymus committed two errors. First, instead of "the Sunday after the Nativity of the Lord", he wrote incorrectly "in the Sunday of the Nativity". Secondly, he mistook the day of Saint Stephen (26 December) for the festivities of King Stephen of Hungary (20 August). Both corrections lead to the birth date of Bolesław on 26 December. This theory was supported by the fact that, in 1085, 28 December fell on a Sunday.

Oswald Balzer refuted Bielowski's theory, arguing that Judith's death was on the night of 24/25 December 1086, and the birth of Bolesław was four months before, on 20 August. According to him, this timing of Judith's death gives rise to possible discrepancies in determining the exact date of Bolesław's birth, but corroborates all known sources who placed the death of Judith. Gallus wrote that Judith died shortly after giving birth to a son. Later sources interpret this as a death in childbirth and Cosmas of Prague followed this fact, though he didn't receive the information firsthand. Hence, his mistake would result in this point. In contrast, the correct date of birth of Bolesław would be 20 August, as indicated by Gallus. In the medieval tradition, the year began on 25 December. In that case, the reports of Cosmas allow us to conclude that Bolesław was born in 1085. This information, however, was contradicted by the Kalendarz krakowski, which gave the year as 1086. Judith was styled by the authors of the Kalendarz as "regina Polonia" (Queen of Poland in Latin), and this title could be associated with her father's coronation as King of Bohemia and Poland on 15 June 1086 (according to Cosmas). Karol Maleczyński refuted Balzer's date for the coronation of Vratislav II, the one given by Cosmas. However, most researchers indicate that the coronation took place on 15 June 1085, so Judith could have been called Queen a year earlier.

Karol Maleczyński determined that the death of Judith took place on the night between 24 and 25 December 1085, and Bolesław was born four months before, on 20 August. Researchers found that the date given by the Rocznik kapituły krakowskiej (24 December 1086) was the same as that established by Cosmas (25 December 1085). The difference in the year could be explained by the different style of dating followed by Cosmas, who began the year according to the Julian calendar on 1 January and Christmas (Nativitate in Latin) on 25 December. According to Maleczyński, Kazimierz Jasiński failed to consider this calendar difference, which occurs only during the period of 25–31 December.

Archaeologist Wojciech Szafrański reassumed the theory of Bielowski: Judith of Bohemia died on 28 December 1085, and Bolesław was born two days before, on 26 December. According to Szafrański, Cosmas used the term VIII Calends of January, with no specific date. However, in the Chronicle of Gallus should read that Judith died on Christmas Day, but on Sunday in the Octave of Christmas. Using such a broadened range of days, the investigator determined the birth of Boleslaw in the feast of Saint Stephen (26 December). For these reasons, the date of 1085 given by Bielowski is correct according to him. However, Jasiński pointed out the weaknesses of the argument of Szafrański because Gallus has written about the Octave, specifically about Christmas night, but the investigator didn't consider all other sources, as well as the achievements of research in genealogy.

Marian Plezia argued that Bolesław was born on 2 September 1085 or 1086. According to Gallus, the day of King Stephen of Hungary was also celebrated on 2 September. Jasiński considered this theory unfounded. In Poland, the feast of King Stephen of Hungary is celebrated by the Kalendarz krakowski and the Kalendarz Kodeksu Gertrudy on 20 August. Besides, if Bolesław was born on 2 September, Gallus probably would have noted that this was the day after the celebration of Saint Giles (1 September), which was attributed to be the intercessor of his birth.

Kazimierz Jasiński placed the death of Judith in the night between 24 and 25 December 1086 and the birth of Bolesław four months before, on 20 August. At this point, he agrees with the findings of Balzer. He supported his views with additional arguments: All sources are based on the missing Rocznika kapituły krakowskiej, and the next known text of this source refers to events in 1086. Cosmas, writing his chronicle a few decades later, probably benefited from oral tradition and could make a mistake when he placed the year. His reports, which placed the birth of Bolesław three days before the death of his mother, denoted a quite short time.

Today is widely recognized that the view of both Jasiński and Balzer is that Bolesław most likely was born on the day of King Stephen of Hungary, 20 August 1086. According to Cosmas of Prague, Bolesław was named after his uncle, Bolesław II the Generous. Władysław I Herman had no reason to name his first-born legitimate son after his brother, but probably in this way tried to placate the former allies of his predecessor.

Bolesław's nickname "Wrymouth" (pl: Krzywousty) appeared in Polish and Latin sources of the 13th century: Genealogia płocka (Criwousti) and the Rocznik świętokrzyski młodszy (Crzyvousti). Probably the origin of this nickname dates back to the 12th century and is related to some physical characteristics of the Polish ruler, who were noticed at the time of his reign. Probably he began to be named in this way after 1114, because Gallus Anonymus in his Chronicle never mentioned it. In the Kronika książąt polskich and Kronika polsko-śląska Bolesław was qualified by the Latin adjective curvus, whose significance remains unclear. According to the 14th-century Kronika o Piotrze Włostowicu, the duke was hunchbacked (Latin: gibbosus) or had a crooked mouth. The 15th-century chronicler Jan Długosz wrote:

He had a mouth on one side slightly bent, and for this he was called Wrymouth; however, this did not mar his face, and even added to him some charm.

In March 1972, in the Masovian Blessed Virgin Mary Cathedral of Płock, where, according to tradition, Bolesław was buried, an archaeological research project was conducted. A coffin was discovered containing the bones of 16 men and women. One of the skulls, of a man who died aged 50, had a deformed mandible. There is a hypothesis that these remains belonged to Bolesław. Opponents of this theory suggest that the duke was named in this way many years after his death, and his contemporary Gallus did not mention any physical defect in the hero of his Chronicles. The defenders of the hypothesis argue that the work of Gallus has the characteristics of a panegyric in honor of Bolesław, because the chronicler did not mention his physical infirmities. It is also speculated that the bone damage occurred as a result of childbirth complications, which led to the death of his mother a few months later.

The nickname of Boleslaw was also explained in other ways. According to a legend, Boleslaw slammed his face against a wall after watching his father's subservience towards the Germans and Czechs. According to Jan Długosz, the duke in his youth had an ulcer, which caused the deformity of his face. According to older historiography, he received the nickname Wrymouth for his perjury.

=== Early years ===
Following Bolesław's birth, the political climate in the country changed. The position of Bolesław as an heir to the throne was threatened by the presence of Mieszko Bolesławowic, who was already seventeen at the time and was furthermore, by agreement with Władysław I Herman himself, the first in line to succeed. In all likelihood, it was this situation that precipitated the young duke Mieszko's demise in 1089. In that same year, Wladyslaw I Herman's first-born son, Zbigniew, was sent to a monastery in Quedlinburg, Saxony. This suggests that Wladyslaw I Herman intended to be rid of Zbigniew by making him a monk, and therefore depriving him of any chance of succession. This eliminated two pretenders to the Polish throne, secured young Bolesław's inheritance and diminished the growing opposition to Wladyslaw I Herman among the nobility. Shortly after his ascension, however, Władysław I Herman was forced by the barons to give up the de facto reins of government to Count Palatine Sieciech. This turn of events was likely due to the fact that Herman owed the throne to the barons, the most powerful of whom was Sieciech.

Around this time, Władysław I Herman married again. The chosen bride was Judith-Maria, daughter of Emperor Henry III and widow of King Solomon of Hungary, who, after her wedding, took the name Sophia in order to distinguish herself from Władysław I Herman's first wife. Through this marriage, Bolesław gained three or four half-sisters, and as a consequence, he remained the only legitimate son and heir. It is believed that the new Duchess was actively aiding Sieciech in his schemes to take over the country and that she became his mistress.

=== Position of Sieciech in Poland ===
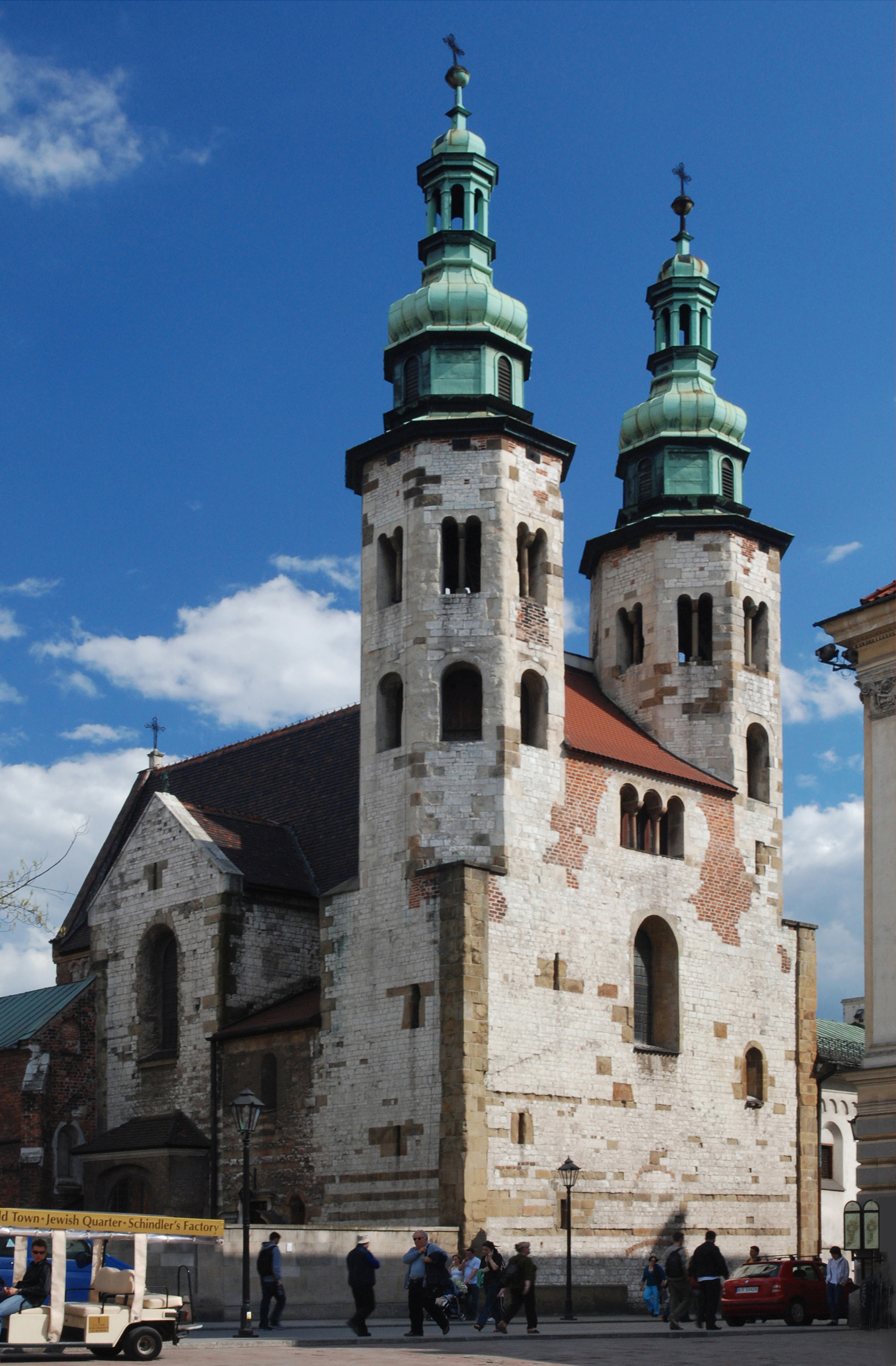
The Church of St. Andrew in Kraków was built through the endowment of Sieciech (1079–1098).

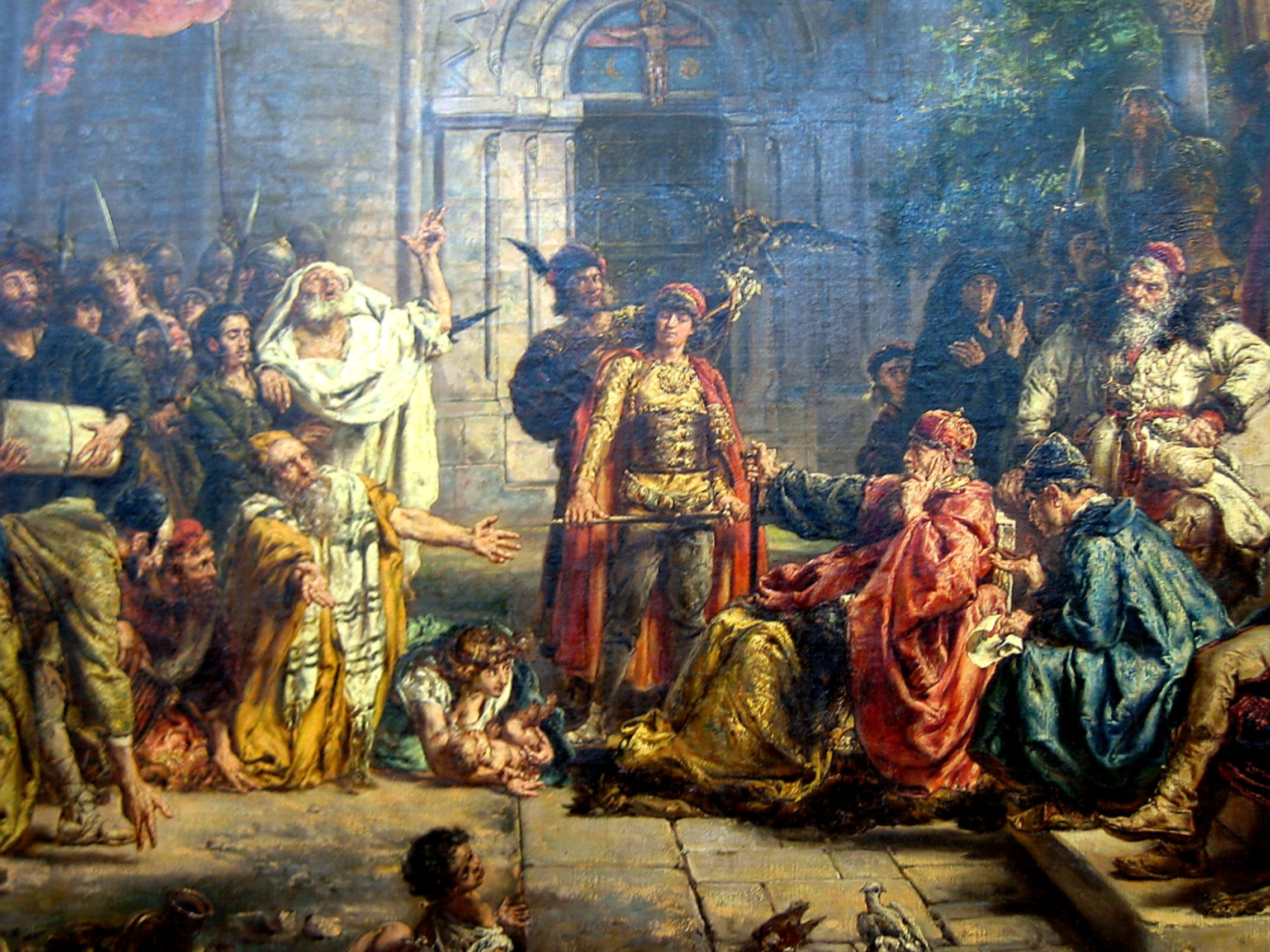
Reception of Jews in Poland in 1096, painting by Jan Matejko.

In 1090, Polish forces under Sieciech's command managed to gain control of Gdańsk Pomerania, albeit for a short time. Major towns were garrisoned by Polish troops, and the rest were burned in order to thwart future resistance. Several months later, however, a rebellion of native elites led to the restoration of the region's independence from Poland. The following year, a punitive expedition was organized in order to recover Gdańsk Pomerania. The campaign was decided at the battle of the Wda River, where the Polish knights suffered a defeat despite the assistance of Bohemian troops.

Duke Bolesław's childhood happened at a time when a massive emigration from Poland was taking place due to Sieciech's political repression. Most of the elites who became political refugees found safe haven in Bohemia. Another consequence of Sieciech's political persecution was the kidnapping of Zbigniew by Sieciech's enemies and his return from abroad in 1093. Zbigniew took refuge in Silesia, a stronghold of negative sentiment for both Sieciech and his nominal patron Władysław I Herman. In the absence of Sieciech and Bolesław, who were captured by Hungarians, duke Władysław I then undertook a penal expedition to Silesia, which was unsuccessful and subsequently obliged him to recognize Zbigniew as a legitimate heir. In 1093 Władysław I signed an Act of Legitimization which granted Zbigniew the rights of descent from his line. Zbigniew was also granted the right to succeed to the throne. Following Sieciech and Bolesław's escape from Hungary, an expedition against Zbigniew was mounted by the Count Palatine. Its aim was to nullify the Act of Legitimization. The contestants met at the battle of Gopło in 1096, where Sieciech's forces annihilated the supporters of Zbigniew. Zbigniew himself was taken prisoner, but regained his freedom a year later, in May 1097, due to the intervention of the bishops. At the same time, his rights, guaranteed by the Act of Legitimization, were reinstated.

Simultaneously, a great migration of Jews from Western Europe to Poland began circa 1096, around the time of the First Crusade. The tolerant rule of Władysław I Herman attracted the Jews, who were permitted to settle throughout the entire kingdom without restrictions. The Polish duke took great care of the Hebrew Diaspora, as he understood its positive influence on the growth of the country's economy. The new Jewish citizens soon gained the trust of the gentiles during the rule of Bolesław III.

== Youth ==
=== Division of the country ===
In view of his father's disapproval, and after discovering the plans of Sieciech and Duchess Judith-Sophia to take over the country Zbigniew gained an ally in the young duke Bolesław. Both brothers demanded that the reins of government be handed over to them. It is difficult to believe, however, that Bolesław was making independent decisions at this point, as he was only 12 years of age. It is postulated that at this stage, he was merely a pawn in the service of the Baron's power struggle. Władysław I Herman, however, agreed to divide the realm between the brothers, each to be granted his own province while the duke – Władysław I himself – kept control of Mazovia and its capital at Płock. Władysław also retained control of the most important cities, i.e., Wrocław, Kraków and Sandomierz. Zbigniew's province encompassed Greater Poland including Gniezno, Kuyavia, Łęczyca Land and Sieradz Land. Bolesław's territory included Lesser Poland, Silesia and Lubusz Land.

The division of the country under Bolesław and Zbigniew's co-rule greatly alarmed Sieciech, who then began preparing to dispose of the brothers altogether. Sieciech understood that the division of the country would undermine his position. He initiated a military settlement of the issue and he gained the duke's support for it. The position of Władysław I is seen as ambiguous as he chose to support Sieciech's cause instead of his sons'.

=== Fight against Sieciech ===
In response to Sieciech's preparations, Bolesław and Zbigniew entered into an alliance at a popular assembly or Wiec organized in Wrocław by a magnate named Skarbimir of the Awdaniec family. There, it was decided to remove the current guardian of Bolesław, a noble named Wojslaw who was a relative of Sieciech, and arrange for an expedition against the Palatine. Subsequently, in 1099, the armies of Sieciech and Duke Herman encountered the forces of Zbigniew and Bolesław near Żarnowiec by the river Pilica. There, the forces of Bolesław and Zbigniew defeated Sieciech's army, and Władysław I Herman was obliged to permanently remove Sieciech from the position of Count Palatine. In the same year, at Christmas, Bolesław concluded a short-lived peace with Bohemia in Žatec. According to Cosmas, Bolesław was appointed Miecznik (en: Sword-bearer) of his uncle Bretislaus II, Duke of Bohemia. In addition, the young duke would be paid the amount of 100 pieces of fine silver and 10 talents of gold annually as a tribute to Bohemia (it was about the land of Silesia, for which he paid tribute to Władysław I).

The rebel forces then headed to Sieciechów, where the Palatine took refuge. Unexpectedly, Duke Władysław came to the aid of his besieged favorite with a small force. At this point, the dukes decided to depose their father. The opposition sent Zbigniew with an armed contingent to Masovia, where he was to take control of Płock, while Bolesław was directed to the South to encircle Władysław's forces. Władysław, however, predicted this maneuver and sent his forces back to Masovia. In the environs of Płock, the battle was finally joined and the forces of Władysław I were defeated. The duke was thereafter forced to send Sieciech into exile. The Palatine left Poland around 1100/1101 and spent time in German territory. He eventually returned to Poland but never played a political role again. He may have been blinded.

== First years of government ==
=== Struggle for supremacy (1102–1106) ===
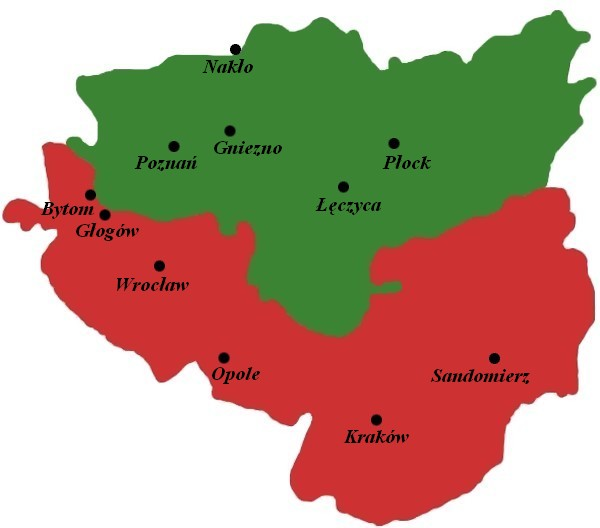
Division of Poland between Bolesław (red) and Zbigniew (green)

Władysław I Herman died on 4 June 1102. The country was divided into two provinces, each administered by one of the late duke's sons. The extent of each province closely resembled the provinces that the dukes were granted by their father three years earlier, the only difference being that Zbigniew also controlled Mazovia with its capital at Płock, effectively ruling the northern part of the kingdom, while his younger half-brother Bolesław ruled its southern portion. In this way, two virtually separate states were created. According to some historians, Zbigniew tried to play the role of princeps or overlord, because at that time Bolesław was only 16 years old. Because he was still too inexperienced to independently direct his domains, the local nobility had great influence over political affairs, including his teacher, Skarbimir, from the Awdaniec family.

They conducted separate policies internally as well as externally. They each sought alliances, and sometimes they were enemies of one another. Such was the case with Pomerania, towards which Bolesław aimed his ambitions. Zbigniew, whose country bordered Pomerania, wished to maintain good relations with his northern neighbor. Bolesław, eager to expand his dominion, organized several raids into Pomerania and Prussia. In the autumn of 1102, Bolesław organized a war party into Pomerania during which his forces sacked Białogard.

The Pomeranians sent retaliatory war parties into Polish territory, but as Pomerania bordered Zbigniew's territory, these raids ravaged the lands of the duke, who was not at fault. Therefore, in order to put pressure on Bolesław, Zbigniew allied himself with Bořivoj II of Bohemia, to whom he promised to pay tribute in return for his help. By aligning himself with Bolesław's southern neighbor, Zbigniew wished to compel Bolesław to cease his raids into Pomerania. Bolesław, on the other hand, allied himself with Kievan Rus and Hungary. His marriage to Zbyslava, the daughter of Sviatopolk II Iziaslavich in 1103, was to seal the alliance between himself and the prince of Kiev. However, Bolesław's first diplomatic move was to recognize Pope Paschal II, which put him in strong opposition to the Holy Roman Empire. A later visit of papal legate Gwalo, Bishop of Beauvais, put church matters into order and increased Bolesław's influence.

Zbigniew declined to attend the marriage of Bolesław and Zbyslava. He saw this union and the alliance with Kiev as a serious threat. He bribed his ally, Bořivoj II of Bohemia, to invade Bolesław's province, ostensibly to claim the Polish crown. Bolesław retaliated with expeditions into Pomerania in 1103 (including the battle of Kołobrzeg, where he was defeated) and Moravia in 1104–1105, which brought the young duke not only loot, but also effectively ended the Pomeranian alliance. During the return of the army, one part, commanded by Żelisław, was defeated by the Bohemians. Bolesław, who commanded the other part, couldn't defeat them. Skarbimir bribed Bořivoj II, who returned to his homeland and concluded a short-lived peace with Bolesław. Then Bořivoj II ended his alliance with Zbigniew.

The intervention of Bolesław in a dynastic dispute in Hungary put him in a difficult political situation. At first, he supported the pretender Álmos, and marched to Hungary to help him. However, during the siege of Abaújvár in 1104, Álmos changed his mind and made peace overtures to his brother and rival King Coloman, at that point Zbigniew's ally. Bolesław then retired his troops from Hungary and, in 1105 made a treaty with Coloman. In addition, the Hungarian King broke his agreements with Bohemia. The dynastic dispute in Prague between Bořivoj II and his cousin Svatopluk prompted Bolesław and his new ally King Coloman to intervene in support of Svatopluk. However, a new rebellion by Álmos forced Coloman and his army to return to Hungary. Bolesław also decided to retreat. Svatopluk tried to capture the city alone, but suffered a complete defeat and so his attempt to seize power in Bohemia was unsuccessful.

Also in 1105, Bolesław entered into an agreement with his half-brother, similar to that entered just a few years before with their stepmother Judith-Sophia, which, in exchange for abundant dower lands, secured her neutrality in Bolesław's political contest with Zbigniew. The treaty, signed in Tyniec, dealt with foreign policy, albeit with no agreement about Pomerania. One year later, the treaty ended when Zbigniew refused to help his half-brother in his fight against Pomerania. While hunting, Bolesław was unexpectedly attacked by them. In the battle, the young duke almost died. Bohemia, using the involvement of Bolesław in Pomeranian affairs as an excuse, attacked Silesia. The duke tried to re-establish the alliance with his half-brother, but without success, and so reached a rapprochement with Bohemia in 1106. Bolesław managed to bribe Bořivoj II to join his side in the contest against Zbigniew and shortly after formally allied himself with Coloman of Hungary. With the help of his Kievan and Hungarian allies, Bolesław attacked Zbigniew's territory, beginning a civil war. The allied forces of Bolesław easily took control of the most important cities, including Kalisz, Gniezno, Spycimierz and Łęczyca, in effect taking half of Zbigniew's lands. Through the mediation of Baldwin, Bishop of Kraków, a peace treaty was signed at Łęczyca, in which Zbigniew officially recognised Bolesław as the Supreme Duke of all Poland. However, he was allowed to retain Masovia as a fief.

=== Sole Ruler of Poland ===
==== First Expedition to Bohemia and exile of Zbigniew ====
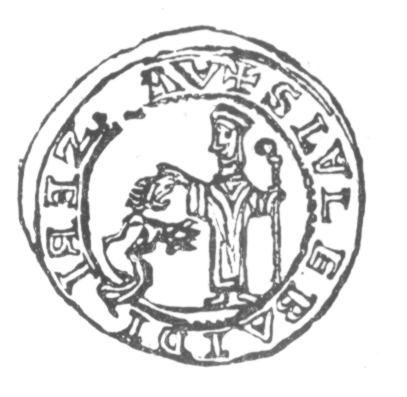
Denarius of Bolesław III Wrymouth

In 1107, Bolesław III along with his ally King Coloman of Hungary, invaded Bohemia in order to aid Svatopluk in gaining the Czech throne and to secure Polish interests to the south. The expedition was a complete success: on 14 May 1107, Svatopluk was made Duke of Bohemia in Prague.

In the winter of 1107–1108, with the help of Kievan and Hungarian allies, Bolesław undertook a punitive expedition against his brother Zbigniew. One reason for this was that Zbigniew had not followed his orders and had refused to burn down one of the fortresses of Kurów near Puławy. Another reason was that Zbigniew had not performed his duties as a vassal by failing to provide military aid to Bolesław for a campaign against the Pomeranians. Bolesław's forces attacked Mazovia and quickly forced Zbigniew to surrender. Following this, Zbigniew was banished from the country and, with his followers, took refuge in Prague, where he gained the support of Svatopluk. From then on, Bolesław was the sole lord of the Polish lands, though in fact his over-lordship began in 1107 when Zbigniew paid him homage as his feudal lord.

In 1108, the balance of power in Europe changed. Svatopluk decided to pay homage to Emperor Henry V and, in exchange, received from him the formal investiture of Bohemia. At the same time, King Coloman of Hungary was under attack from the combined forces of the Holy Roman Empire and Bohemia. Svatopluk, joined by Zbigniew and his followers, also attacked Poland. Bolesław avoided a direct confrontation because he was busy fighting Pomerania. The Polish-Hungarian coalition gave aid and shelter to Bořivoj II. Later that year, Bolesław and Coloman sent a new expedition to Bohemia, prompted by the invasion of Hungary by the German-Bohemian coalition (during which Pozsony Castle was put under siege) and the fact that Svatopluk, who owed Bolesław his throne, didn't honor his promise to return Silesian cities seized from Poland (Racibórz, Kamieniec, Koźle among others) by his predecessors. Bolesław then decided to restore Bořivoj II to the Bohemian throne, but was unable to do so owing to the need to divert his forces north to thwart a Pomeranian invasion.

==== Polish-German War of 1109 ====
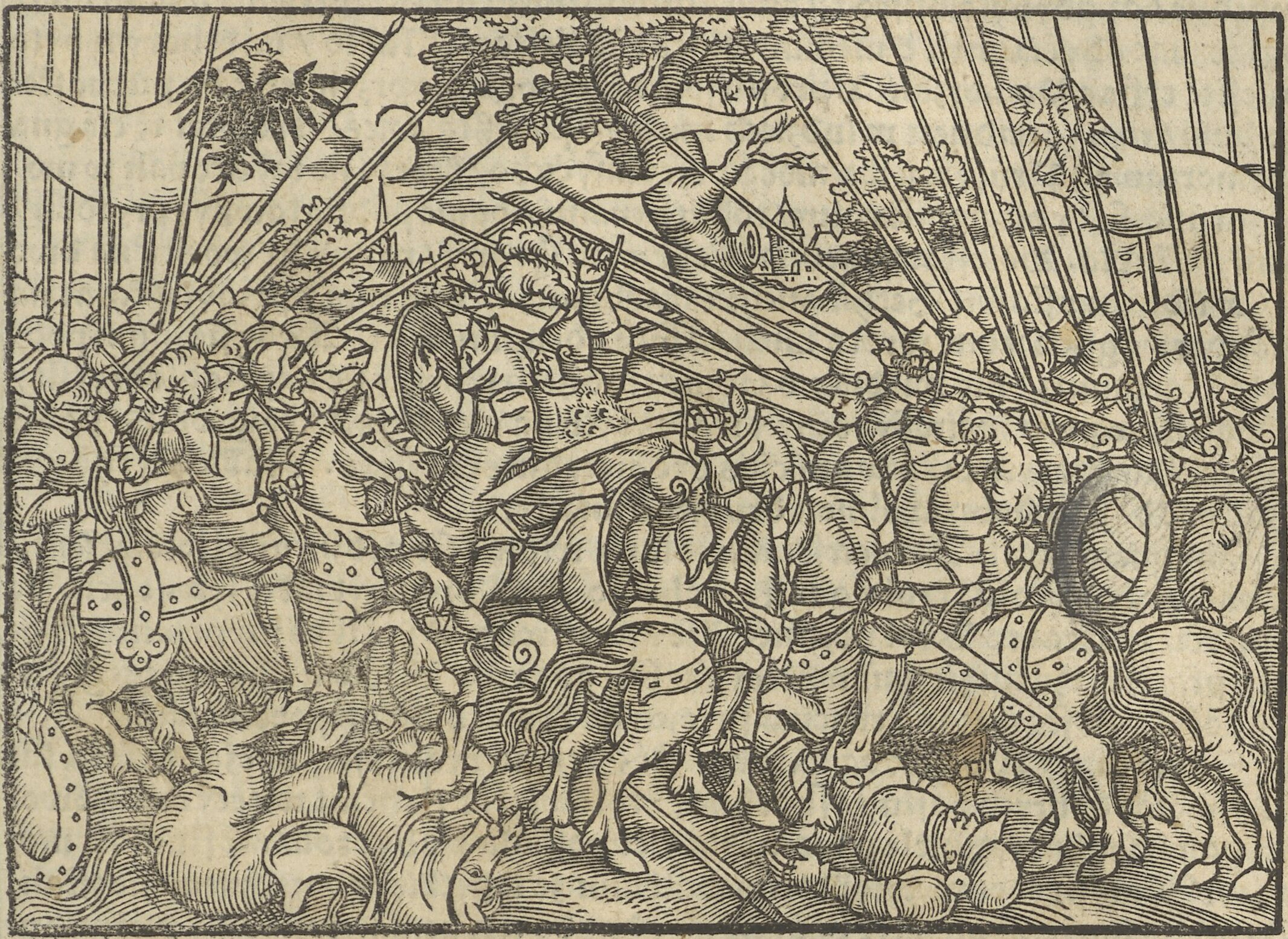
Battle of Hundsfeld, from The Polish Chronicle of Marcin Bielski (1564)

In response to Bolesław's aggressive foreign policy, the Holy Roman Emperor, Henry V, undertook a punitive expedition against Poland in 1109, assisted by Czech warriors provided by Svatopluk of Bohemia. The alleged casus belli was to restore Zbigniew to his former position. The Emperor gave Bolesław an ultimatum: he would abandon the expedition only if Bolesław gave Zbigniew half of Poland to rule, formally recognized Henry as overlord and paid 300 pieces of fine silver as a regular tribute. Bolesław rejected Henry's demands. During the negotiations between the Empire and Poland, the Polish ruler was in the middle of a war against Pomerania. On the west side of the Oder river, Henry V hurriedly gathered knights for his expedition against Poland. Before the fight ended in Pomerania, the German troops were able to approach Głogów.

The military operations mainly took place in Silesia in southwestern Poland, where Henry V's army laid siege to the major cities of Głogów, Wrocław and Bytom Odrzański. In addition to defending the towns, Bolesław conducted a guerrilla war against the Holy Roman Emperor and his allies. He reportedly defeated the expedition at the Battle of Hundsfeld on 24 August 1109, although the existence of this battle is doubted by historians because it was first recorded about a century later.

==== Second Expedition to Bohemia ====
In 1110, Bolesław undertook an unsuccessful military expedition against Bohemia. His intention was to install yet another pretender on the Czech throne, Soběslav I, who sought refuge in Poland. During the campaign, he won a decisive victory against the Czechs at the Battle of Trutina on 8 October 1110; however, following this battle, he ordered his forces to withdraw. The reason for this is speculated to be the unpopularity of Soběslav I among Czechs as well as Bolesław's unwillingness to further harm his relations with the Holy Roman Empire. In 1111, a truce between Poland and the Empire was signed, stipulating that Soběslav I would be able to return to Bohemia while Zbigniew would be able to return to Poland. Bolesław's assent was likely under pressure from the many supporters of the exiled duke in 1108, who, according to the reports of Gallus Anonymus, were surrounded by bad advisers (probably including Martin I, Archbishop of Gniezno). Once in Poland, his advisers persuaded Zbigniew to claim sovereignty over his previous domains. The first step was his presence at the Advent ceremonial, surrounded by attendants, with a sword carried before him, an exclusive prerogative of the ruler. As he had recognized Bolesław as his overlord in Łęczyca in 1107, Boleslaw considered this an act of treason, causing a definitive breach in their relationship. Probably for these reasons, Zbigniew was blinded on Bolesław's orders in 1112.

==== Excommunication ====
The blinding of Zbigniew caused a strong negative reaction among Bolesław's subjects. Unlike in the east, blinding in medieval Poland was accomplished not by burning the eyes out with a red hot iron rod or knife, but by employing a much more brutal technique in which the condemned's eyes were pried out using special pliers. The condemned was then made to open his eyes and if he did not do so, his eyelids were also removed.

Contemporary sources don't provide clear information on whether Bolesław was excluded from the community of the Church. It is generally believed that Archbishop Martin I of Gniezno (who was a strong supporter of Zbigniew) excommunicated Bolesław for blinding his half-brother. The excommunication exempted all Bolesław's subjects from their oaths of obedience. The duke was faced with a real possibility of an uprising of the sort that deposed Bolesław the Bold. Recognizing his precarious situation, Bolesław sought the customary penance that would reconcile him with the high priesthood. According to Gallus Anonymus, Bolesław first fasted for forty days and made gifts to the poor:

[...] He slept in ashes and sackcloth, among the streams of tears and sobs, as he renounced communion and conversation with people.

It is possible that Bolesław decided to do this to rebuild his weakened authority and gain the favor of Zbigniew's supporters. Blinding his half-brother might have been perceived by Polish society as a breach of the principle of solidarity among the members of the ruling dynasty, a key foundation of public order.

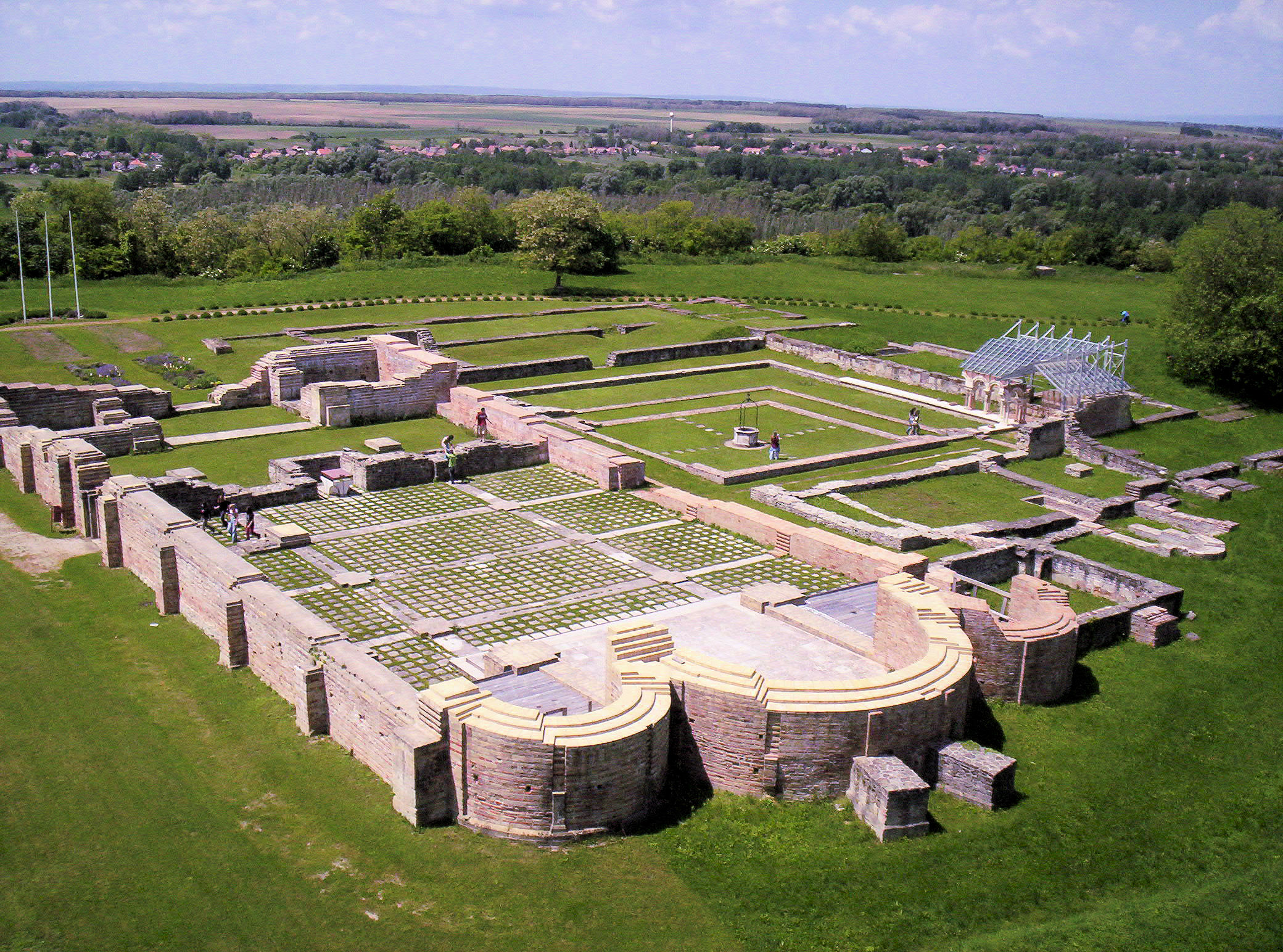
Ruins of the Abbey of Saint Giles in Somogyvár, Hungary.

According to Gallus, Bolesław also sought and received forgiveness from his half-brother. In the next part of his penance, the duke made a pilgrimage to Hungary to the Abbeys of Saint Giles in Somogyvár and Saint Stephen I in Székesfehérvár. The pilgrimage to the Abbey of Saint Giles also had a political goal; Bolesław strengthened his ties of friendship and alliance with the Arpad dynasty. Following his return to Poland, Bolesław even traveled to Gniezno to pay further penance at the tomb of Saint Adalbert of Prague, where poor people and clergy received numerous costly gifts from the duke. Only after this was the excommunication finally lifted. Following his repentance, the Polish duke made a vague commitment to the Church.

No information survives about Zbigniew's death. In the obituary of the Benedictine monastery in Lubiń dated 8 July 1113 was reported the death of a monk in Tyniec called brother Zbigniew. Historians believed that he could be Bolesław's half-brother. The information marked that his burial place was in the Benedictine monastery of Tyniec.

== Conquest and conversion of Pomerania ==
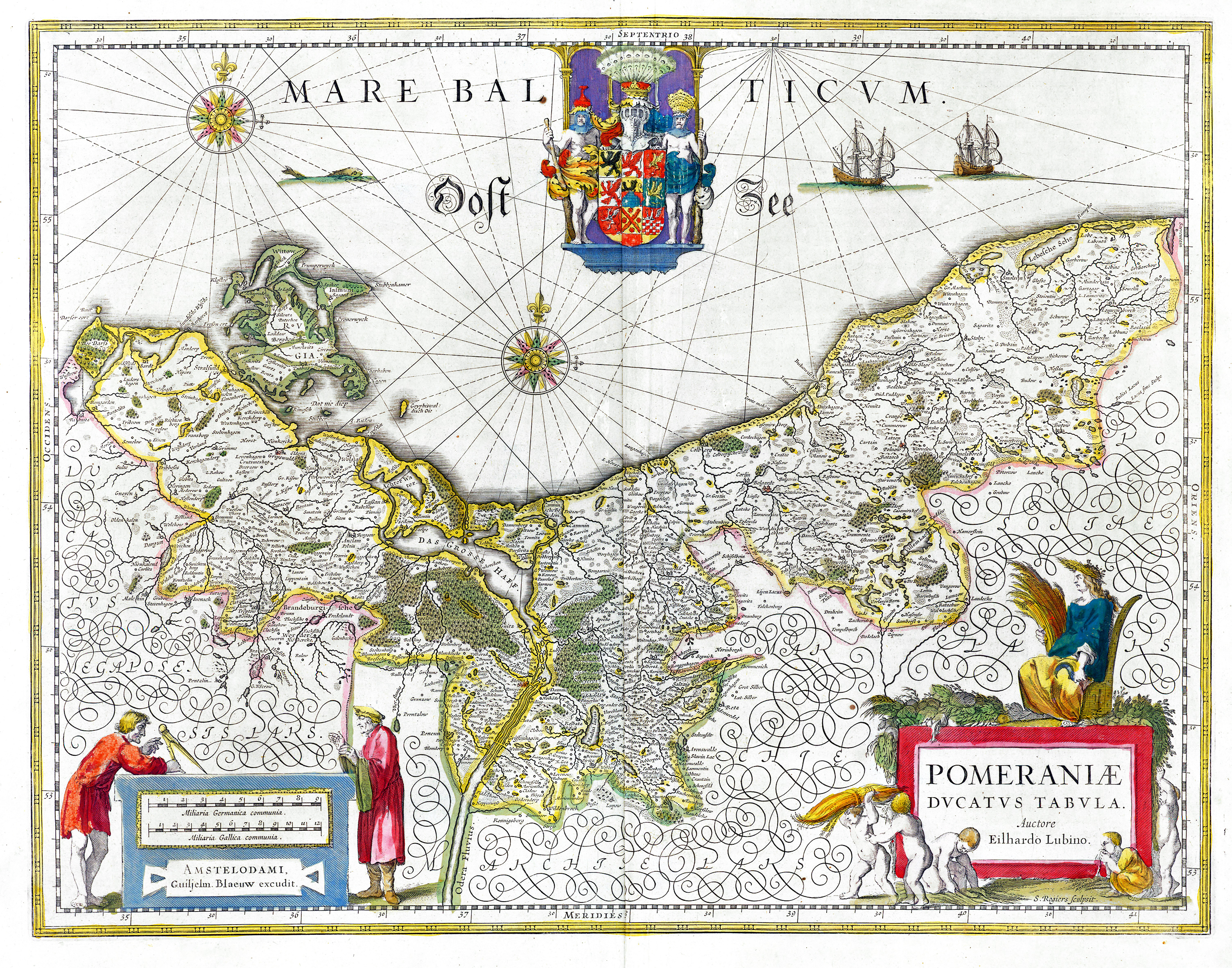
Map of Pomerania including the island of Rugia (17th century).

The loss of Pomerania during the reign of Casimir I the Restorer weakened the Polish state, and, during the second half of the 11th century, subsequent rulers were not able to recover all the lands that once belonged to Mieszko I and Bolesław I the Brave. Only after defeating Zbigniew and successfully opposing Bohemian claims against Silesia in 1109 was Bolesław III able to expand to the West.

=== Strengthening the Polish-Pomeranian borders ===
The conquest of Pomerania had been a lifelong pursuit for Bolesław. His political goals were twofold: to strengthen the Polish border on the Noteć river line and to subjugate Pomerania. He intended to exercise Polish political overlordship but not actually incorporate Pomerania with the exception of Gdańsk Pomerania and a southern belt north of the River Noteć. By 1113, the northern border had been strengthened, including the fortification of Santok, Wieleń, Nakło, Czarnków, Ujście and Wyszogród. Some sources report that the border began at the mouth of the rivers Warta and Oder in the west, running along the Noteć all the way to the Vistula.

Before Bolesław III began to expand in Gdańsk Pomerania (Pomerelia), he normalized his political relations with Bohemia in 1114 at a great convention on the border of the Nysa Kłodzka river. He was assisted by Bohemian princes of the Premyslid line: namely, Vladislaus I, Otto II the Black and Soběslav I. The pact was sealed by the marriage of Bolesław (a widower since his wife Zbyslava's death) with Vladislaus I and Otto II's sister-in-law, the German noblewoman Salomea of Berg.

=== The conquest of Gdańsk Pomerania ===
After normalising his relations with Bohemia, Bolesław conducted a successful expedition against Prussia in 1115. This secured Poland's north-east border, which allowed it to invade Gdańsk Pomerania. The conquest of this part of the Pomeranian lands from 1115 to 1119 achieved a long-time aim of previous Polish rulers: the complete incorporation of the territories on the Vistula River, including the castellany of Nakło, into Poland. The northern borders of the Polish duchy were probably established on the line of the rivers Gwda and Uniesta (in later times these rivers were the boundary between Pomerania and the Oder Slavic). It is also possible that the border ran along the Łeba.

The local rulers of the conquered Gdańsk and Słupsk were replaced by Polish nobles. Bolesław also introduced a Polish clerical organisation in order to protect his interests in that territory. However, these areas refused to follow the church organization. The incorporation into the Polish Church occurred only during 1125–1126 at the time of the visit of the papal legate, Gilles, Cardinal-Bishop of Tusculum.

==== Rebellion of Skarbimir ====
During Bolesław's Pomeranian campaign, a rebellion led by Count Palatine Skarbimir from the Awdaniec family began. The rebellion was quelled by the duke in 1117 and the mutinous nobleman was blinded as punishment. The conflict between Bolesław and the Awdaniec family is difficult to explain due to the lack of sources. The cause was probably the growing influence of the family, Skarbimir's ambition, and his jealousy of Bolesław and his increased popularity. Other probable factors were the desire to establish Władysław II, Bolesław's first-born son, as the sole ruler after his death, or Boleslaw's fears of losing his position, as had happened in the conflict with Sieciech. It was also suggested that Skarbimir contacted the Pomeranians and Vladimir II Monomakh, Grand Prince of Kievan Rus'. Medieval historiography also associated the rebellion with the Law of Succession issued by Boleslaw. The underlying inheritance controversy arose between 1115 and 1116, after the birth of his second son, Leszek, first of his second marriage. According to one hypothesis, Skarbimir objected to the adoption of the statute, which changed the traditional Polish succession customs. In the suppression of the rebellion, a major role was played by Piotr Włostowic of the Labedz family, who replaced Skarbimir as Count Palatine. On his defeat, Skarbimir received a minor punishment from Bolesław. The rebellion of Skarbimir also underlined the importance of the conquest of Gdańsk Pomerania.

==== Intervention of Kievan Rus' ====
The Rurikid ruler Vladimir II Monomakh and his sons are believed to have intervened in Skarbimir's rebellion. In 1118, Monomakh incorporated Volhynia into his domains and expelled the ruler, Yaroslav Sviatopolkovich, who sought refuge first in Hungary, then in Poland. In Yaroslav's place, Monomakh made his son Roman ruler of Volhynia, and after Roman's early death in 1119, replaced him with another son, Andrew, who invaded Polish territory in 1120 with the support of the Kipchaks tribe. A year later, Bolesław, with his brother-in-law, the exiled Yaroslav, organised a retaliatory expedition to Czermno. For several years thereafter, Bolesław intervened in the dynastic disputes of the House of Rurik.

During the 1120s, the Kievan princes continued their expeditions against Poland. The neutrality of the neighbouring Principality of Peremyshl was attributed to Count Palatine Piotr Włostowic, who in 1122 captured Prince Volodar. A year later, Bolesław intervened again in Volhynia, where he wished to restore Yaroslav. The expedition (aided by Bohemian, Hungarian, Peremyshl and Terebovl forces) failed due to the death of Yaroslav and the stubborn resistance of the besieged Volodymyr-Volynskyi, aided by Skarbimir's supporters. This failed military expedition led to disturbances in the Polish-Hungarian-Halych alliance.

=== Conquest of Western Pomerania ===
In 1121 (or 1119) Pomeranian Dukes Wartislaw I and Swietopelk I were defeated by Bolesław's army at the battle of Niekładź near Gryfice. Polish troops ravaged Pomerania, destroyed native cities, and forced thousands of Pomeranians to resettle deep into Polish territory. Bolesław's further expansion was directed to Szczecin (1121–1122). He knew that this city was well defended by both the natural barrier of the Oder river and his well-built fortifications, like Kołobrzeg. The only way to approach the walls was through the frozen waters of a nearby swamp. Taking advantage of the element of surprise, Bolesław launched his assault from precisely that direction and took control of the city. Much of the population was slaughtered and the survivors were forced to pay homage to the Polish ruler.

Bolesław probably fought battles on the western side of the Oder, as well as near Lake Morzyce (now the German Müritz), which were technically outside of Pomerania. At the same time, Lothair, Duke of Saxony (and future Holy Roman Emperor), also moved against this area. According to contemporary sources, a Saxon army approached from above the Elbe River in the direction of modern-day Rostock. They conquered the Warinis, Circipanes, Kessinians and part of the Tollensers tribes. This two-pronged expansion was probably the result of earlier unknown agreements between the rulers. This was the first step for the later Christianization of Pomeranian lands.

In 1122, Bolesław finally conquered Western Pomerania, which became a Polish fief. Duke Wartislaw I was forced to pay homage, as well as an annual tribute of 500 marks of fine silver to the Polish ruler, and was further obliged to give military aid at Bolesław's request. In subsequent years, the tribute was reduced to 300 marks. This success enabled Bolesław to make further conquests. In 1123, his troops even reached Rügen, but failed to conquer it.

According to modern historiography, Bolesław began to pay tribute to Emperor Henry V, at least from 1135, believed to have been 500 marks of fine silver annually. It is unknown why Bolesław did this, as the sources do not contain any reference to the Polish ruler being tributary to the Holy Roman Empire in the period 1121–35.

=== Christianisation of Western Pomerania ===
In order to strengthen ties with Pomerania, Bolesław organized a mission to Christianise the newly acquired territory. At the same time, he wished to subordinate Pomerania to the Gniezno Archbishopric. Unfortunately, the first attempts made by unknown missionaries did not make the desired progress. Another attempt, officially sponsored by Bolesław and led by Bernard the Spaniard, who traveled to Wolin during 1122–1123, ended in another failure. The next two missions were carried out in 1124–1125 and 1128 by Bishop Otto of Bamberg (called the Apostle of Pomerania). After appropriate consultation with Bolesław, Bishop Otto set out on the first stage of Christianisation of the region in 1124. During the mission Otto stayed first at Bolesław's court, where he was provided with appropriate equipment, fire and several clergymen for his trip to Pomerania.

The Bishop was accompanied throughout his mission by the Pomeranian ruler Wartislaw I, who greeted him on the border of his domains, in the environs of the city of Sanok. In Stargard the pagan prince promised Otto his assistance in the Pomeranian cities as well as help during the journey. He also assigned 500 armored knights to act as guards for the bishop's protection, and obtain the baptism of the elders' tribal leaders. Primary missionary activities were directed to Pyrzyce, then the towns of Kamień, Wolin, Szczecin and once again Wolin. In the first two towns, the Christianization went without resistance. In Kamień, the task was facilitated by the intercession of Wartislaw I's own wife and dignitaries. At Szczecin and Wolin, which were important centers of Slavic paganism, opposition to conversion was particularly strong among the pagan priests and local population. The conversion was finally accepted only after Bolesław lowered the annual tribute imposed on the Pomeranians. Four great pagan temples were torn down and churches were built in their places. Otto's mission of 1124 ended with the erection of bishoprics in Lubusz for Western Pomerania and in Kruszwica for Eastern Pomerania (Gdańsk), which was subordinated to the Archbishopric of Gniezno.

In 1127, the first pagan rebellions began to take place. These were due to both the large tribute imposed by Poland as well as a plague that descended on Pomerania, which was blamed on Christianity. The rebellions were largely instigated by the old pagan priests, who had not come to terms with their new circumstances. Wartislaw I confronted these uprisings with some success, but was unable to prevent several insurgent raids into Polish territory. Because of this, Bolesław prepared a massive punitive expedition that may have spoiled all the earlier accomplishments of the missionary work by Bishop Otto. Thanks to Otto's diplomacy, direct confrontation was avoided and in 1128, he embarked on another mission to Pomerania. Wartislaw I greeted Otto at Demmin with some Polish knights. This time, more pressure was applied to the territories west of the Oder River, i.e. Usedom, Wolgast and Gützkow, which weren't under Polish suzerainty. The final stage of the mission returned to Szczecin, Wolin and Kamień. The Christianization of Pomerania is considered one of the greatest accomplishments of Bolesław's Pomeranian policy.

In the late 1120s, Bolesław concluded an alliance with King Niels of Denmark, directed against Wartislaw I and the attempts of Lothair III, King of Germany, to subordinate Western Pomerania. Around 1128, Niels' son Magnus married Ryksa, Bolesław's eldest daughter. In retaliation for the sack of Płock by Wartislaw I in 1128, Polish-Danish troops took the Western Pomeranian islands of Wolin and Usedom.

At the end of the 1120s, Bolesław began to implement an ecclesiastical organisation of Pomerania. Gdańsk Pomerania was added to the Diocese of Włocławek, known at the time as the Kujavian Diocese. A strip of borderland north of Noteć was split between the Diocese of Gniezno and Diocese of Poznan. The bulk of Pomerania was, however, made an independent Pomeranian bishopric (whose first bishop, Adalbert, was one of the participants in the missionary expedition and a former Polish royal chaplain), set up in the territory of the Duchy of Pomerania in 1140, and, after Bolesław died in 1138, the duchy became independent of Poland.

=== The project of Archbishop Norbert of Magdeburg ===
During the 1130s, Norbert, Archbishop of Magdeburg undertook a project under which Pomerania would be divided between two dioceses subordinated to his archbishopric. At the same time, he revived the old claims of Magdeburg's ecclesiastical sovereignty over all Poland. A first Bull was prepared by 1131, but never entered into force. Despite this setback, Norbert continued to attempt to subdue the Polish Church during 1132–33. A call was made in the Curia on behalf of the Polish bishops.

The Polish bishops didn't appear before Pope Innocent II, which resulted in the issuing of the Bull Sacrosancta Romana in 1133, which confirmed the sovereignty of the Archbishopric of Magdeburg over the Polish Church and the projected Pomeranian dioceses. The formal privilegium maius was the culmination of Norbert's efforts. Bolesław, trying to save his past efforts in Pomeranian politics, submitted at Merseburg in 1135.

=== Conquest of Rügen and alliance with Wartislaw I ===
To consolidate his power over Pomerania, Bolesław conducted an expedition to the island of Rügen in 1130 with Danish support. The fleet transported Polish troops to Rügen, but the intended battle on the island never happened, because, at the sight of the Polish-Danish combined forces, the defending Rani recognized Bolesław's overlordship.

After the successful invasion of the Danish capital, Roskilde, in 1134, Bolesław formed an alliance with Wartislaw I of Pomerania against King Eric II of Denmark, an ally of Emperor Lothair III. The role of the Polish duke was limited to aiding the House of Griffins, not due to a real interest in Danish affairs. The Danish, after repelling the first attack, led a successful retaliatory expedition and expansion into Pomerania.

== Congress of Merseburg ==
=== Political Background ===
In 1125, Henry V, Holy Roman Emperor and King of Germany died. His successor, Lothair of Supplinburg, was embroiled in disputes over his inheritance and became involved in papal politics. In 1130, there was a double election to the Apostolic See. Lothair supported Pope Innocent II, hoping in this way to secure his own coronation. Contrary to expectations, Lothair's Imperial coronation didn't end his disputes against the contenders for the German throne.

In 1130, Bolesław controlled the areas situated on the left bank of the Oder River on the island of Rügen. Germany had designs on these lands, but its internal political situation and its involvement in a civil war in Hungary made an armed conflict impractical. The death of King Stephen II of Hungary in 1131 had led to war between two claimants to the throne: Béla the Blind (son of Álmos, Duke of Croatia) and Boris (the alleged son of King Coloman). Boris sought the help of the Polish ruler, who hoped for a closer alliance with Hungary and cooperation with the Kievan princes (Boris was a son of a daughter of Vladimir II Monomakh). However, Bolesław overestimated his strength against Béla, who had the support of almost all his country. The Polish army faced the combined forces of Hungary, Bohemia, Austria and Germany in the Battle of the Sajó River (22 July 1132), where the coalition achieved complete victory over the Polish duke, who was forced to retreat.

The success in Hungary was used by the Bohemian ruler Soběslav I, an Imperial vassal, who during 1132–34, repeatedly invaded Silesia. The question of Silesia's property was left to Lothair III. Around the same time, the bull Sacrosancta Romana of 1133 gave the Archbishopric of Magdeburg sovereign rights over the Pomeranian dioceses instituted by Bolesław.

=== Preparations for the Congress ===
In February 1134, Soběslav I of Bohemia and dignitaries of King Béla II of Hungary, together with Peter, Bishop of Transylvania, went to Altenburg, where they presented their allegations against the Polish ruler. They again, as they had two years before, requested the intervention of the Holy Roman Empire. Lothair III agreed to arbitrate the various dynastic disputes.

At the same time, Béla II and Prince Volodymyrko of Peremyshl undertook a military expedition against Poland. The combined forces occupied Lesser Poland, reaching to Wiślica. Shortly after, Bolesław received a summons to the Imperial court at Magdeburg on 26 June 1135. He sent deputies in his stead in order to buy time. The emperor sent another delegation and requested his personal appearance on 15 August 1135, this time in Merseburg. Bolesław realized that without an agreement with Lothair III, he couldn't maintain control over the newly conquered lands on the west side of the Oder and the island of Rügen.

Even before the Congress of Merseburg took place, Bolesław persuaded one of the ruling dukes of Western Pomerania, Ratibor I, to make an expedition against Denmark, a clear provocation to Emperor Lothair III, as the King of Denmark was a German vassal. A Pomeranian fleet of 650 boats (with 44 knights and 2 horses) attacked the rich Norwegian port city of Kungahälla (now Kungälv in Sweden).

=== Provisions of the Congress ===
The Congress took place on 15 August 1135. During the ceremony, Emperor Lothair III recognized the rights of the Polish ruler over Pomerania. In return, Bolesław agreed to pay homage for the Pomeranian lands and the Principality of Rügen, with the payment of 6,000 pieces of fine silver from these lands to the Holy Roman Empire; however, he remained a fully independent ruler of his main realm, Poland. With Bolesław's death in 1138, Polish authority over Pomerania ended, triggering competition of the Holy Roman Empire and Denmark for the area. The conflict with Hungary also ended, with Bolesław recognizing Béla II's rule. The agreement was sealed with the betrothal of Bolesław's daughter Judith with Béla II's Géza (this marriage never took place). In the case of the Bohemian-Polish dispute, the Imperial mediation failed. Bolesław argued he must be treated as a sovereign ruler, which wasn't the case with Soběslav I, an imperial vassal. Lothair III, unable to come to an agreement with the Polish ruler, proposed to discuss the matter in subsequent negotiations.

The Congress ended with church ceremonies, during which Bolesław carried the imperial sword. This was an honor granted only to sovereign rulers. An indirect goal of Polish diplomacy was the successful invalidation of the Papal Bull of 1133 and the recognition of metropolitan rights of the Archbishopric of Gniezno at the Synod of Pisa in 1135. On 7 July 1136, Pope Innocent II issued the protectionist Bull Ex commisso nobis a Deo under which the unquestioned sovereignty of the Archbishopric of Gniezno over the Polish dioceses was confirmed.

== Last years and death ==
=== Normalisation of relations with his neighbors ===
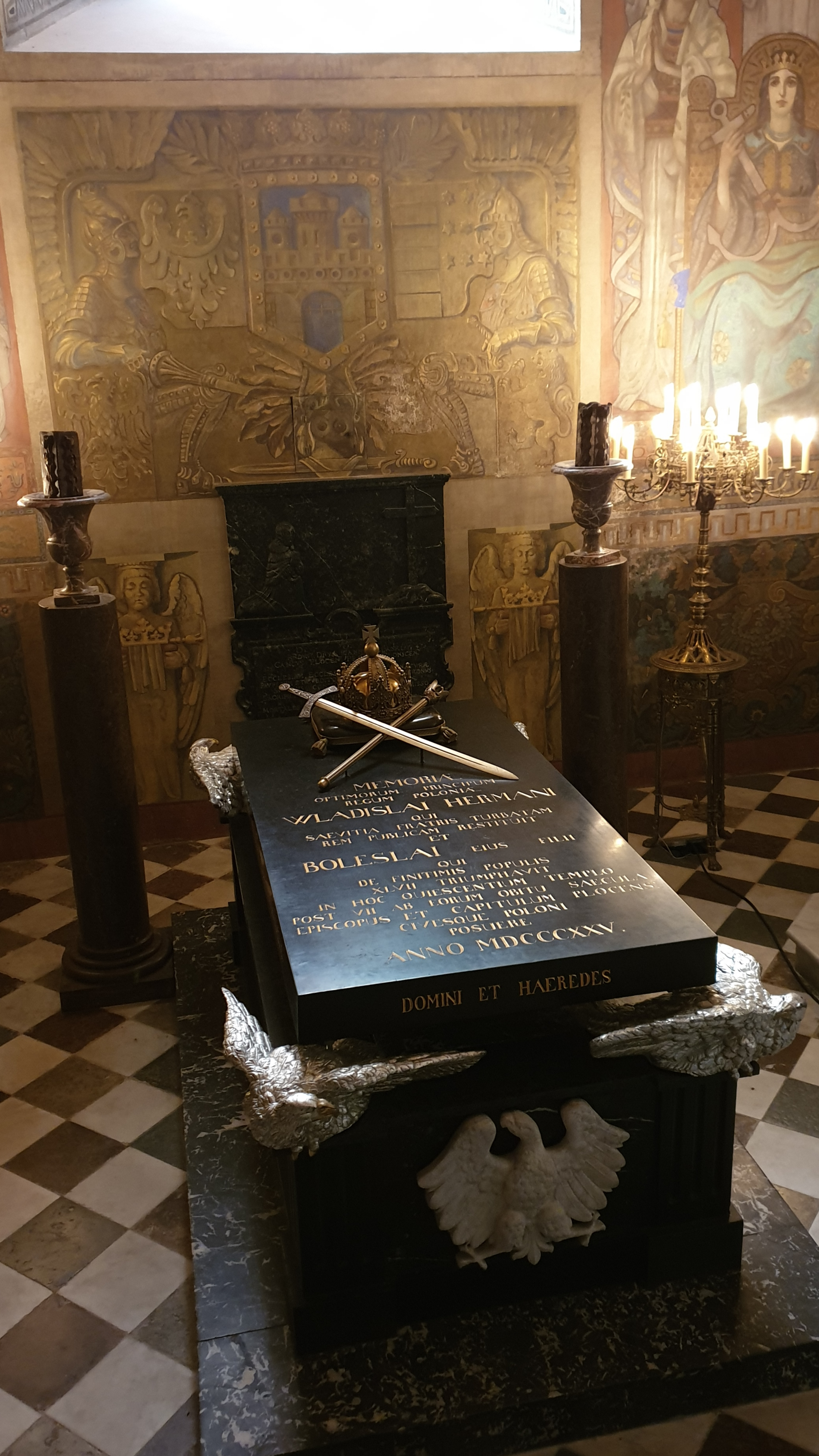
Sarcophagus of Bolesław III in Płock Cathedral.

After coming under the imperial sphere of influence, Poland normalized its relations with Bohemia at the Congress of Kłodzko on 30 May 1137 (the so-called Peace of Kłodzko), but the details of this agreement are unknown. This treaty was confirmed in the town of Niemcza, where Władysław, the eldest son of Bolesław, stood as godfather in the baptism of Wenceslaus, Soběslav I's son.

In the last years of his life, Bolesław's main concern was to arrange political marriages for his children in order to strengthen his relations with neighboring countries. In 1137, Bolesław reinforced his relations with the Kievan Rus' with the marriage of his son Bolesław with Princess Viacheslava, daughter of Vsevolod, Prince of Pskov. In the year of his death, he finally normalized his relations with Hungary through the marriage of his son Mieszko with Princess Elizabeth, daughter of King Béla II.

=== Death ===
Bolesław III Wrymouth died on 28 October 1138, probably in the town of Sochaczew. There are no records about the circumstances of his death, and twelfth-century sources don't provide information about his place of burial. It was only in the 15th century that Jan Długosz recorded that the duke's tomb was in the Masovian Blessed Virgin Mary Cathedral in Płock. He didn't reveal the source of this information, but it was presumably from the lost Rocznik mazowiecki. Wawrzyniec Wszerecz, Canon of Płock during the 16th–17th centuries, wrote that Bolesław was in a common coffin at the cathedral, where the remains of his father Władysław I Herman and several other Piast Masovian rulers were also placed. In his testament he divided his lands among his sons into five principalities.

== Family ==
=== First marriage ===
Zbyslava of Kiev (c. 1085/1090 – c. 1114), his first wife was a member of the Rurikid dynasty. She was the daughter of Grand Prince Sviatopolk II of Kiev. The marriage was probably concluded in 1103 in order to obtain future military help from Kiev in the fight against Zbigniew. This union also notoriously limited the attacks of the princes of Galicia and Terebovlia against Poland. Until Zbyslava's death, relations between Poland and the Principality of Galicia–Volhynia remained friendly. The children born from this marriage were:

1. Władysław II the Exile (1105 – 30 May 1159), the only son of Bolesław and Zbyslava, was Prince of Kraków, Silesia, Sandomierz, eastern Greater Poland, Kuyavia, Western Pomerania and Gdańsk Pomerania (1138–1146). Gallus Anonymous wrote that the heir of the Polish throne was born in the winter of 1107–1108, but omitted the gender and name of the child. The Rocznik świętokrzyski and Rocznik kapitulny recorded Władysław's birth in 1105;
2. A daughter [Judith?] (c. 1112 – after 1124), married in 1124 to Vsevolod Davidovich, Prince of Murom. Her filiation is doubtful, because Russian chronicles only noted that Vsevolod's wife came from Poland. She could be either Bolesław and Zbyslava's daughter or a member of the Awdaniec family as daughter of Skarbimir.

Older historiography referred to an unnamed second son born from the marriage of Bolesław and Zbyslava. Gallus Anonymous wrote that this son was born around 1107–1108. According to Oswald Balzer, he died shortly after birth. However, Karol Maleczyński believed that he never existed, noting that the sources that provided the year of 1105 as Władysław II's date of birth (Rocznik świętokrzyski and Rocznik kapitulny) were probably mistaken.

=== Second marriage ===
Salomea of Berg (c. 1093/1101 – 27 July 1144), his second wife, was German, the daughter of Henry I, Count of Berg. The marriage took place in January or February 1115. This union was connected with the signing of a peace treaty between Poland and Bohemia. Salomea came from a powerful family, who, having supported the opposition after the death of Emperor Henry V in 1125, lost their political influence at the court of Lothair III:

1. Leszek (1115/1116 – 26 August before 1131), the eldest son of Bolesław and Salomea. He probably died in infancy;
2. Ryksa (1116 – after 25 December 1156), eldest daughter of Bolesław and Salomea, in 1127 she married Danish prince Magnus Nilsson, future King of Västergötland, in order to obtain Danish support in the war against Germany, but in 1134 Denmark sided with Germany regardless. After Magnus' death in 1134, Ryksa returned to Poland. Later, she married Volodar Glebovich, Prince of Minsk and Hrodno; this marriage was concluded in order to cement an alliance against Hungary. Her third marriage was with King Sverker I of Sweden;
3. A daughter (before 1117/1122 – after 1131), betrothed or married in 1131 to Conrad, Count of Plötzkau and Margrave of Nordmark;
4. Casimir, known in historiography as the Older (9 August 1122 – 19 October 1131), according to sources (like Rocznik kapituły krakowskiej), he died aged 9. Jan Długosz in his chronicle wrote that he was born from the marriage of Bolesław and Adelaide, the Prince's supposed second wife;
5. Gertruda (1123/1124 – 7 May 1160), a nun at Zwiefalten (1139);
6. Bolesław IV the Curly (c. 1125 – 5 January 1173), Prince of Masovia and Kuyavia (1138–1146), of Kraków, Gniezno and Kalisz (1146–1173), of Sandomierz (1166–1173), married aged 12 with Viacheslava, daughter of Vsevolod, Prince of Pskov. Jan Długosz reported his birth in 1127 as the second son born to Bolesław and Adelaide;
7. Mieszko III the Old (1126/1127 – Kalisz, 13 March 1202), Duke of Greater Poland (1138–1202), of Kraków (1173–1177, 1190, 1199–1202), of Kalisz (1173–1202), of Upper Gdańsk Pomerania (1173–1202) and Kuyavia (1195–1198), around 1136 married to Elizabeth of Hungary, Duchess of Greater Poland, daughter of King Béla II of Hungary. The marriage was concluded as one of the provisions of the Congress of Merseburg;
8. Dobroniega Ludgarda (1129 – by 1160), after her father's death, she was married by her mother, Salomea around 1146–1148 to Theodoric I, Margrave of Lusatia, who later repudiated her;
9. Judith (1130 – 8 July 1175), betrothed in 1136 to Prince Géza, son of King Béla II of Hungary; however, the marriage never took place and in 1148 she married Otto I, Margrave of Brandenburg;
10. Henry (1131 – 18 October 1166), Duke of Sandomierz (1146–1166), according to Jan Długosz he was born in 1132. Further mention of him was made in his chronicle by 1139, describing the division of the country into districts. Karol Maleczyński placed his birth between 1127 and 1131. During his father's lifetime, Henry didn't play an important political role. He died in 1166 in battle against the Prussians, unmarried and childless;
11. Agnes (1137 – after 1182), around 1140–1141, she was a proposed bride to one of the sons of Grand Prince Vsevolod II of Kiev. This union was to ensure the support of Kiev in the dispute between Salomea's sons and Władysław II, their half-brother. At the end, the marriage never took place and she married around 1149–1151 to Mstislav II, Prince of Pereyaslavl and Grand Prince of Kiev since 1168;
12. Casimir II the Just (1138 – 5 May 1194), Duke of Wiślica (1166–1173), of Sandomierz (1173–1194), of Kraków (1177–1194), of Masovia and Kuyavia (1186–1194), for a long time considered a posthumous child, and for this reason not included in his father's testament.

Older historiography attributed another two daughters from the marriage of Bolesław and Salomea: Adelaide and Sophia. Adelaide (c. 1114 - 25 March before 1132) was the first wife of Adalbert II the Pious, eldest son of Leopold III, Margrave of Austria. Modern historians deny that she was a daughter of Bolesław. Sophia (d. 10 October 1136) was probably the mother of Mateusz, Bishop of Kraków.

In older historiography, Adelaide, a supposed daughter of Emperor Henry IV, was erroneously considered to be another wife of Bolesław. The information about this stated that after the death of Zbyslava, Bolesław married her in Bamberg in 1110. This report is provided by Jan Długosz and Archdeacon Sulger. This view was challenged by Oswald Balzer.

== Succession provisions ==
=== Senioral principle ===
Bolesław's experiences during his youth probably motivated him to make a division of his domains among his surviving sons. The loyal Count Palatine Piotr Włostowic was appointed to execute the provisions. In his testament, also known as the "Statute of Succession", Bolesław introduced the "senioral principle" in Poland in an effort to preserve the unity of the state and to prevent a power struggle among his sons. This regulation about the succession came into force after Bolesław's death, although the exact date of its establishment is unknown. It is believed that its creation may have occurred in 1115 or 1116, after the birth of his son Leszek, or after the suppression of the rebellion of Skarbimir (in 1117). Sources indicate that the original document about the succession was drawn up in 1137. The Statute was nullified in 1180 but restored by Pope Innocent III in 1210 after a petition of the Silesian rulers; however, historians challenge this account in the absence of any other information.

The senioral principle established that the eldest member of the dynasty was to have supreme power over the rest and was also to control an indivisible "senioral part": a vast strip of land running north–south down the middle of Poland, with Kraków its chief city. The senior duke's prerogatives also included control over Pomerania, a fief of the Holy Roman Empire. Sources showed a discrepancy in terms of the power exercised by the senior duke. Pope Innocent III wrote about primogeniture, while Wincenty Kadłubek refers to both seniority and primogeniture. Kadłubek combined in one sentence the two systems, i.e., inheritance of supreme power in individual districts, where primogeniture was in force. Among historians, there is a view that what Bolesław established was not seniority, but primogeniture that belongs exclusively to Władysław II and his descendants. The coverage and nature of power exercised by Bolesław IV the Curly in 1146 support this hypothesis.

=== Division of the Polish state ===
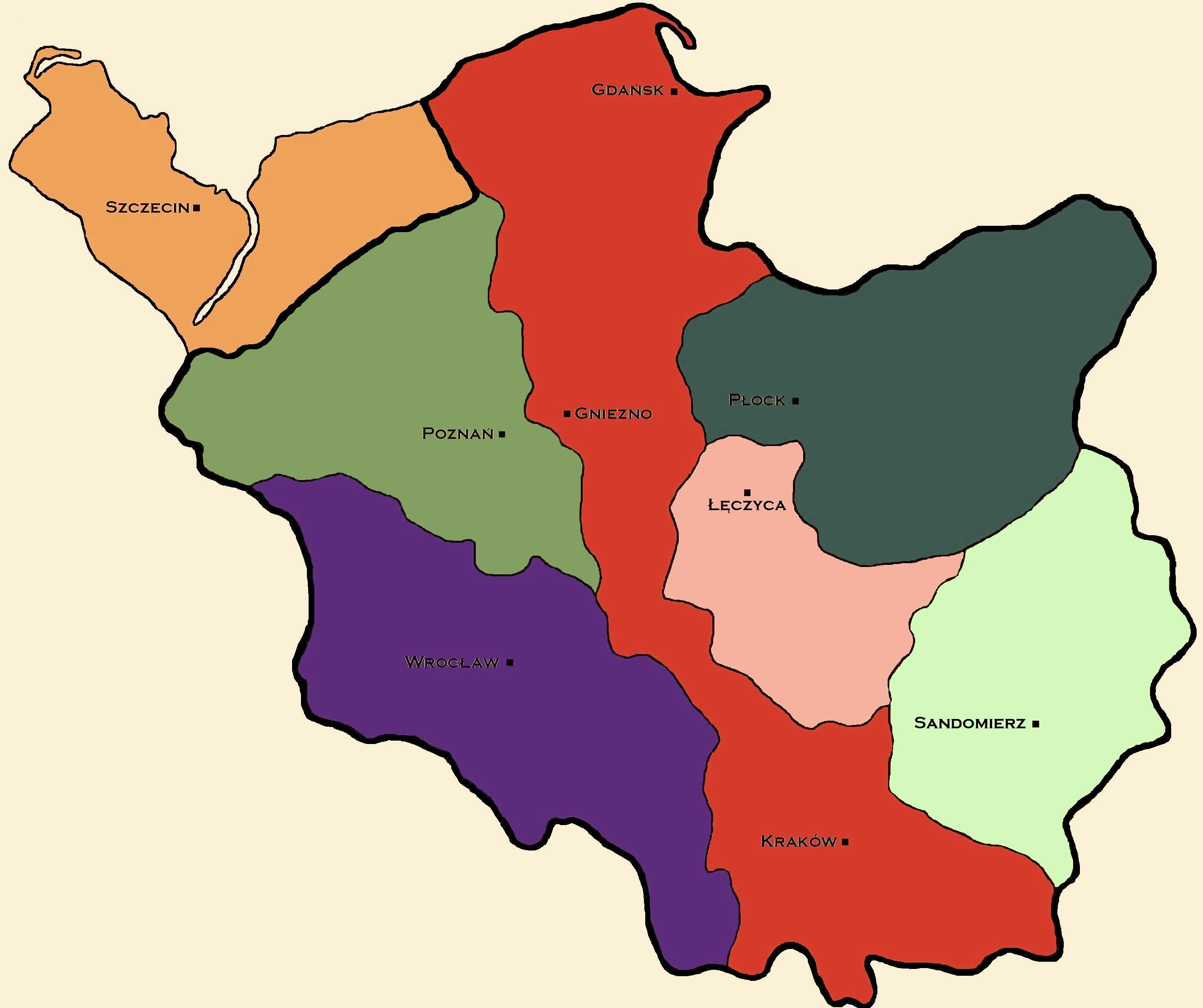
Fragmentation of Poland in 1138 (in accordance with Testament of Bolesław III Wrymouth) The Seniorate Province (Eastern Greater Poland, Western Kuyavia, Wieluń Land, Lesser Poland) under Władysław II the Exile Silesian Province of Władysław II the Exile Masovian Province of Bolesław IV the Curly composed of Masovia and Eastern Kuyavia Greater Poland Province of Mieszko III the Old composed of Western Great Poland Sandomierz Province of Henry of Sandomierz, split off from the Seniorate Province Łęczyca Province (Łęczyca Land and Sieradz Land) as Salomea of Berg's dower Pomerania, fiefdom of Poland under the control of the princely superior of Poland (princeps).

Bolesław divided his domains into the following provinces: The Seniorate Province (with its capital Kraków) was supposed to be non-inherited and indivisible. It consisted of Lesser Poland, Sieradz and Łęczyca, the western part of Kruszwica and Kuyavia, the eastern part of Greater Poland, Kalisz, Gniezno and Gdańsk Pomerania. Western Pomerania as a fief would remain under the control of the senior duke.

- Władysław II received the Silesian Province, comprising Silesia, with his capital Wrocław and the Lubusz land. He probably received this domain by 1124 or 1125 after his marriage with Agnes of Babenberg. As the eldest son, he became the first senior duke (or princeps).
- Bolesław IV received the Masovian Province, with his capital in Płock and eastern Kuyavia.
- Mieszko III received the Greater Poland Province, composed of the remaining western parts of Greater Poland, with his capital in Poznań.
- Henry received the Sandomierz Province, composed of eastern Lesser Polish territories centered around the city of Sandomierz and the Bug River to the north, with his capital in Lublin.
- Salomea, Bolesław's widow, received Łęczyca or Sieradz-Łęczyca as her dower. After her death, these lands were to be included in the Seniorate Province.

Casimir II, Bolesław's youngest son, was not included in the testament because he was born after his father's death or shortly before.

Among medievalists, there is a view that the Statute only provides the inheritance of Bolesław's descendants in the first generation (i.e., his sons). After their deaths, their lands were to be included in the Seniorate Province. However, the later fights among them transformed the provinces into hereditary domains.

=== Feudal division of Poland ===
The "Senioral Principle" was soon broken, leading to a period of nearly 200 years of Polish disintegration, also known as feudal fragmentation, a phenomenon common in medieval Europe. Among other countries affected by this were Russia, Hungary, and Germany. This was a time of internal struggles that caused the weakening of the Polish state and the enormous growth of internal development, culture, and improvement of the situation of the broader population. Distribution of the then-princely rights by contemporary historiography also had benefits, which include: the reconstruction of the political system in the new economic fundamentals and placement of greater responsibility for the fate of the country upon its upper echelons.

== Organisation of state ==
A detailed knowledge of the internal organisation of the 12th century Polish state is impossible. There are no documents from this period and the reports of chroniclers reflect a lack of real knowledge of the principality's management.

Bolesław divided his domains into provinces, districts and gords (Polish: gród; a type of fortified village or castellany). The Opole remained within this structure. The territorial scope of the province corresponded to the later Dzielnica. It is believed that 6–7 provinces were created: Masovia, Silesia, Greater Poland, Kraków, Sandomierz, Kalisz-Łęczyca and Pomerania (from the lands of Gdańsk Pomerania). During Bolesław's reign, attempts were made to organize the border areas into marches following the German model. Among the marches corroborated in the available sources are: Głogów, Gdańsk and probably Lubusz. Bolesław likely had a number of well-maintained castles that served political, economic and administrative roles.

The state's nature during the Piast dynasty was patrimonial. The ducal court (Latin: curia ducis) was a center of power, which belonged to the reigning family (along with a separate court for the duchess); after them came the secular and Church dignitaries and subjects, then lower officials, knights, courtiers, and chaplains. The most important office at the court of Władysław I Herman and Bolesław was the count palatine, also known as voivode. The duties of the count palatine (Latin: comes palatinus) included major command of the military expeditions in place of the ruler, defense of the State, supervision of the administration as head of the ducal court, control and appointment of the heads of the castellanies, and the administration of the courts. The office of Count Palatine was abolished in 1180. The Polish bureaucracy developed as early as the reign of Mieszko II Lambert. The collector (Latin: camerarius) managed the economy of the ducal court. Among other offices in the ducal court were the cześnik (cup-bearer), the stolnik (esquire), the strażnik (guard), the miecznik (Sword-bearer), the Koniuszy (Master of the Horse) and the Łowczy (Master of the Hunt). The office of the chancellor, who directed the work of the court offices and the ducal chapel (Latin: capella), which entailed a number of secular and religious duties, appeared during Bolesław's reign. Michał Awdaniec was a chancellor at this time. Also under the central government were the treasurer, the Mint Master, and others. During the rule of Bolesław, the structure of the state was closely linked to the organization of the Polish Church, given that the church was subject to the ruler, who had the right of Investiture.

The ducal court was in contact with the subjects via the castellanies, which were managed by the Naczelnik or Town Chief (Latin: princeps terrae). He had sovereignty over the castellanies or gords (Latin: comes), while the castellans (grod rulers) exercised the local civil authority, getting benefits from the public, organizing the defense and probably administering the courts. Under the direct control of the ruler were the bailiff, the źupan (gastald), the minters, the celnik (tax collector) and collectors. All important functions in the principality were held by the nobility. The castellan belonged to the group of nobles, officials and ministerialis. Some served the rule directly, others held office, while the roles of others were limited to addressing food shortages. The Margraves (who were in charge of the border areas) were directly subordinate to the Polish ruler and had greater power than the provincial chiefs.

By the end of the 11th century, this princely organization was replaced by the Western European chivalric model. The Latin term milites, which had been used to refer to the soldiers, came to refer instead to the knights and warriors who could afford to keep a horse. Polish armed forces in Bolesław's times were composed of three types of forces: the princely army (Oddziału nadwornego), the lord's army (Drużyny możnowładców) and the militia (Pospolite ruszenie), composed of branches of small feudal lords and peasants. According to other views, the militia adjutant troops were powerful and also composed of clergy and laity.

The princely army consisting of his nobles – at the end of the 11th century, the so-called "New People" (pl: Nowi Ludzie): tribal chiefs, local leaders and opolne rulers who aspired to participate in government – sent their sons to the duke's court, where he accompanied the ruler. Bolesław's personal guard was probably chosen by himself, using an invocation which was written in the Chronicles of Gallus Anonymus:

A young people, with great manners and high birth, by my side constantly in battle, with me accustomed to hardships!

The nobles maintained their own army, which consisted of poor knights supported by peasants. They were responsible for purchasing their own armaments. Among the equipment used by them were: wooden weapons (e.g., spear), blunt weapons (e.g., club), cutting weapons (e.g., sword) and belching weapons (e.g., crossbow, bow and arrow, sling), and so-called protective equipment (shield, helmet, armor). These armies over time become larger than the princely one, the most notorious example being the Sieciech. During the constant conflicts at the beginning of the 12th century, the nobles mustered the militia, particularly of the endangered lands. The whole militia was divided into branches, which were given the names of their native districts (for example, the Kruszwiczan hordes). In the case of an armed conflict requiring a greater force, independent branches composed of peasants were mustered (for example, during 1109).

In addition to the nobles (who were tied to the ruler and his court) and warriors, the Polish society in Bolesław's times also consisted of free peasants and servants (attached to his place of residence). The free people consisted of the so-called guests (Latin: hospites), who did not own property, and the warriors (Latin: milites gregarii), who had farms and are counted among the common people. At the bottom end of the social scale were the slaves (brańcy of war, or their descendants). There was little difference between them and the free peasants, but their duty to their master was higher. Non-free population was also used for personal service or to work on the land for the benefit of the ruler.

All aspects of life in the state were regulated by the ducal judge (Latin: ius ducale). He covered all the rights of the duke, in relation to the subjects or property, the enforcement of a variety of benefits, dues and ministries. The expanded state apparatus and the church maintained by benefits from the population, producing material goods. The main burden of the tax rests on the lowest social class: the peasantry (Latin: heredes, rustici ducis, possesores). Up to them to submit certain levies, tithes, and other forms of taxes like the podworowe (in the form of a cow, which consisted of the entire village), podymne (for every house), poradlne (for each piece of land), narzazu (for grazing pigs in the woods), the stacji or stanu (who allow the maintenance of the duke's court) and the posług komunikacyjnych, who regulated the transport ways in the country and was divided in three main taxes: przewód ("the cable"), powóz ("the carriage") and podwód ("the wagon"). Other minor taxes involved hunting, military, guards (who had custody of the guards), taxes on regalia and criminal penalties. In addition, subjects were required to repair roads, bridges, construction and maintenance of castles.

== Seals and coinage ==
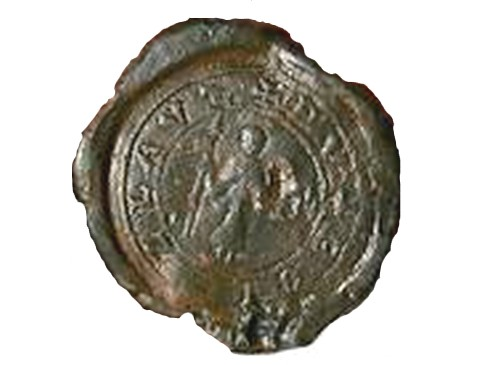
Bulla discovered in Ostrów Tumski (2005)

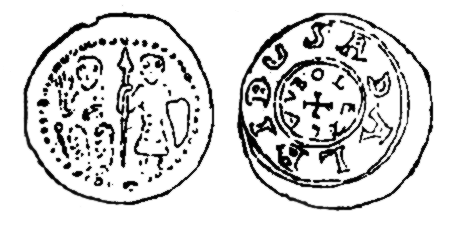
Denarius with the legend ADALBIBVS

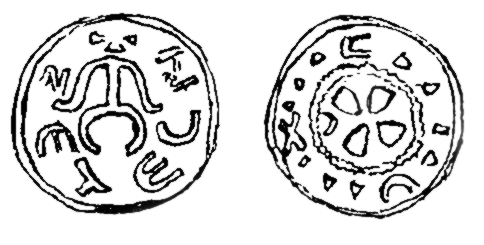
Denarius with "cavalry" cross of Sieciech

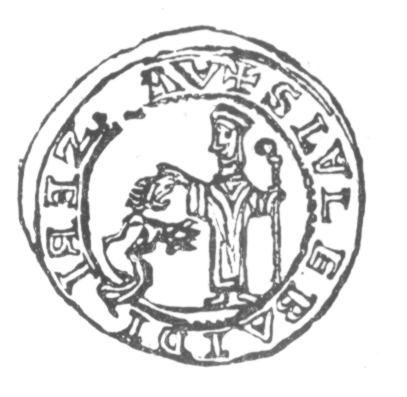
Boleslaw's protective bracteate

Of the five oldest preserved seals from Polish rulers, four were discovered in various places during 2002–2006, while one was more than 100 years old. Polish archaeologists made further discoveries in Głębokie (2002), in Ostrów Tumski (2005), in Gniezno (2005) and in an undisclosed location in the village of Susk near Sierpc, 32 km from Płock (2006). The first preliminary studies suggested that the seals could belong to Bolesław III Wrymouth. They are made of lead, a durable material, with a diameter of 36–40 mm. The lead seals are used at that time in European courts and are from the Bulla type. Seals are known in municipal and military orders. Occasionally, in the most important documents (acts), were used golden bullas.

The discovered bullae from Bolesław's reign fall into two major types, differing in the form of writing:

- Type I: extended stored on the obverse in the genitive, with the Latin word sigillum;
- Type II: short and around the bulla.

One example from both types of seals came from the relationship with St. Adalbert, where he emphasizes his pontifical recognition (in type I) and in the crosier, with the gesture of the imposition of hands, clearly visible in the seals after restoration (in type II). The use of the genitive seals in Poland came from the 12th century, a phenomenon (unprecedented), with its only then monetary equivalent in the denarius with the Latin legend: Denarivs ducis Bolezlai. At the end of Bolesław's reign, the inscriptions returned to the staid mold with the Latin legend: Dvx Bolezlavus. According to S. Suchodolski, the bullae were used for the authentication of princely documents like letters, privileges, judgments, etc., and by T. Jurek, they could also be used to secure the business arrangements (like buy of doors, chests, reliquaries).

In October 2006, the Poznań Society of Friends of Learning confirmed that the discovered bullae during 2002–2005 belonged to Bolesław III Wrymouth.

During Bolesław's reign, a two-sided denarius appeared, which was denominated the foreign coin (Polish: monetą obcą). The first known denarius from this time bears the Latin legend Bolezlav. For the others, most commonly used coins bear the Latin inscription Bolezlavs, denarivus, dicis Bolezlai with St. Adalbert in the reverse. Another type of coin didn't have legends. They differed mostly came from the weight: they were much lighter, punched for purely economic purposes.

At this time was also modeled mainly on the Magdeburg technique a bracteate, which was one of the oldest in Europe. There are two types of bracteates who dated from Bolesław's reign:

- The type II shows in both sides before Bolesław and St. Adalbert, who put his hand over the ruler in a gesture of protection. The legend shows the Latin inscription Bolezlaus Adalbertus. This bracteate initially was considered a way of penance from Bolesław for Zbigniew's blinding. Was probably minted in Kraków around 1127.
- The type I is less frequent. Showed St. Adalbert in episcopal robes, holding a crozier and a Gospel. Legend of the coin determines the form of the Archbishop of Gniezno. Further studies have shown that the coin was minted between the period of the Congress of Merseburg (1135) and Bolesław's death (1138). It is now called the protective, since it illustrates the protection of St. Adalbert to the Polish ruler, who, after his homage to the Holy Roman Empire in 1135, only recognizes the saint as his protector. It is one of the few examples of political propaganda in the coin's legend. According to A. Schmidt, this was an Archbishop's coin which was minted in Gniezno, probably in 1135.

In addition to the two presented bracteates from Bolesław's, there is one, which is now counted among the oldest known in numismatics. This bracteate was found in Brzeg (in Gmina Pęczniew) and preserved almost the 2/3 part of the whole weight of 0.61 g and a diameter of 27 mm. The coin shows the figure of the ruler with a crown, sword in hand and an outstretched hand. Initially, it was believed that it showed Władysław II the Exile. Further studies, conducted by A. Mikolajczyk, identified this image with Bolesław III Wrymouth. Among researchers, however, today, there are discrepancies about which ruler showed the coin, because the inscription preserved is incomplete.

Princely mints are mostly located in Wrocław, Płock, Gniezno and Kraków. In that time also existed private mints, such as Palatine Sieciech, who placed them in Sieciechów and near Kraków.

== Church foundations ==
It was customary during the 12th century for ruling families to engage in wide-ranging religious activities like donations in the benefit of the Church. The main objective was to spread Christianity. This was to legitimize religious rulers in the face of God, church hierarchs, clergy and society. Bolesław was not the exception, and he was not only a predatory warrior, a cunning politician and a diplomat; he was also a patron of cultural developments in his realm.

Like most medieval monarchs, he founded several churches and monasteries. Among the most important of which are:

- The Benedictine monastery of Holy Cross atop the Łysa Góra, which was founded in place of an ancient pagan temple. The first Abbot of this monastery, Boguchwał, wrote about the foundation and the Duke:

The pious Duke Bolesław founded in Łysa Góra an Abbey dedicated to the Holy Trinity with monks of the Order of St. Benedict.

Stored documents from about 1427 (called the świętokrzyskie dokumenty pergaminowe) confirm the history of the Bishop, adding that the co-founder of the monastery was the knight Wojsław.

- The St. Giles' Church, Inowłódz was built in the Romanesque style. According to a modern plate inscription (presumably from the 17th century), this temple was built in 1082 by Władysław I Herman. However, modern research revealed that the foundation of the Church was probably during the 12th century (at the latest from 1138) and the founder was Bolesław;
- The Collegiate Church of the Assumption of the Blessed Virgin Mary in Ostrów Tumski was founded thanks to the donations of Haymo, Bishop of Wrocław and comes Wojsław in 1120, following the reports of the 15th-century Rocznika głogowskiego. Modern scholars believed that the founder was Bolesław (T. Lalik), or the foundation was made by Bishop Haymo and Wojsław with the consent of the Duke (H. Gerlic) or was a foundation made by Bishop Haymo and Bolesław (T. Jurek). In earlier studies of the history of Silesia, the opinion existed that Bolesław founded the Collegiate as a gesture of gratitude for the loyalty and bravery of the people of Głogów and also as a way of penance for Zbigniew's blinding;
- The Benedictine Abbey in Tyniec, according to some hypotheses, was also founded by Bolesław. In 1124, the Papal legate issued the confirmation of the goods received from the Abbey's estates;
- The Abbey of Lubiń was restored during 1137–1138 by Bolesław and the Awdaniec family;
- The Wawel Cathedral was completed during Bolesław's reign. In 1118, Bishop Maurus was buried there;
- The Canons regular of St. Augustine in Trzemeszno was probably founded by Bolesław. Evidence of this was in a document issued by Mieszko III the Old in 1145.

The connection of Bolesław and his second wife, Salomea, with the Swabian monastery of Zwiefalten was well known. The detailed description of Berthold of Zwiefalten was the only evidence of the cultural, artistic and religious development of the 12th-century Polish court:

The Polish Duke Bolesław sent the black cover choirs black, sewn white oxen [...] the gold, the silver, and the tablecloths, and especially in the most numerous of any kind of valuable furs to this monastery more than seventy grzywna. Salomea, his wife, sent gold woven stole, two alb knitted silk and silver pitcher with four grzywna on the box of ivory studded with gold, to draw up the choir covers his red coat decorated with gold stripes, and another coat on for the Mass all interwoven gold, dissuaded gold stripes and bottom trimmed with red frames, which according to the custom of the people is decorated with golden stars, curtain wall, one with a silk frames, the other adorned with white lions and the third red in the white list, [...] a hand from Saint Stephen the Martyr [...], a large piece of the Holy Cross, a tooth from Saint John the Baptist, a tooth from Saint Pancras, a tooth of Saint Cecilia, some of the blood of Christ, milk of the Virgin Mary and a chain of Saint Peter. In addition, one hundred pounds of silver, one gold appliqué alb, a cross gold weighing more than four fine gold, a silver gilt chalice, a silver plated pitcher of nearly six fines, a stole embroidered with gold, together with a scarf, a belt, a dalmatic all woven of gold, with the value of fifty and more brands, one black tunic with gold appliqué, a scarf and a cloth interwoven with gold, which together can have a value of twenty grzywna, a curtain wall, knitted silk, one box of ivory, one beautiful crystal vessel, three horses, two ounces of gold, two coats, one of which [...] ermine, a bishop's miter with gloves, on four fine and three coats of other goodies.

The same source mentioned that the golden cross donated to the monastery was made by master Leopard, who worked for the Polish ruler during 1129–1137.

The Reliquary of 1113 is an example of the artistic development during Bolesław's rule; it was made during the penitential journey to the tomb of Saint Adalbert in Gniezno Cathedral after the blinding of Zbigniew, according to the reports of Gallus Anonymus:

The evidence of the great work of goldsmiths, Bolesław had made on a relic of the Saint, as a testimony to his devotion and penance. Half a coffin contains 80 grzywna, the purest gold, not counting the pearls and precious stones that probably matched the value of the gold.

The reliquary contained the head of Saint Adalbert. At the end of the 15th century, it was melted in order to make a new one. According to the notes of 1494, it had the form of an octagonal shrine. The side walls have the shape of squares and were separated by small columns, which were based on the figures of saints or prophets. The monument was decorated with 8 pearls and 40 sapphires.

== Polish historiography during Bolesław's reign ==
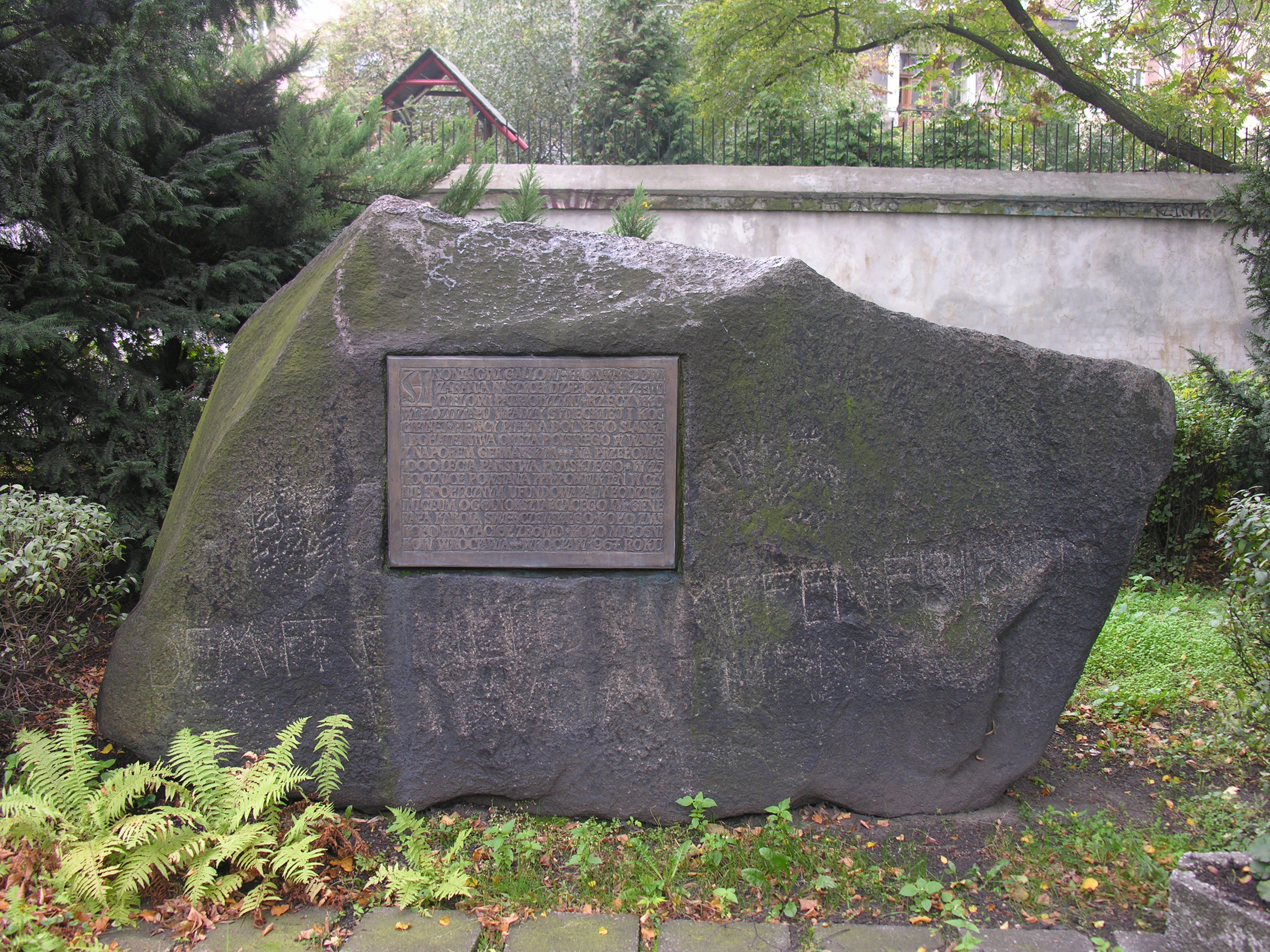
Stone in honor of Gallus Anonymous in Wrocław.

During his rule, Bolesław wanted the history of the Piast dynasty to be chronicled. This task was assigned to an unnamed Benedictine monk (Historians have coined the name Gallus Anonymous for the chronicler). Research has suggested multiple hypotheses for the monk's origin, finding connections to Venetian, French, Hungarian, etc.

The Gesta Chronica Polonorum, written in Latin, was made between 1112 and 1116. The history of the State (Latin: gesta ducum) was made describing the fate of the rulers. The Chronicle covers the history from legendary times until 1114. Composed of three parts, this unfinished literary work justified the right of the Piasts to rule over Poland. The Chronicle also explains many controversial events that were placed under the responsibility of the rulers and gives a full explanation about their policy.

== See also ==
- Piast dynasty
- History of Poland (966–1385)

Bolesław III Wrymouth Piast Dynasty Born: 20 August 1086 Died: 28 October 1138
Preceded by Władysław I Herman	Duke of Poland with Zbigniew until 1107; 1102–1138	Succeeded by Władysław II the Exile; Bolesław IV the Curly; Mieszko III the Old; Henry of Sandomierz
