= Battle of Gopło =

1096 battle of the Civil war in Poland

- Part of Civil war in Poland
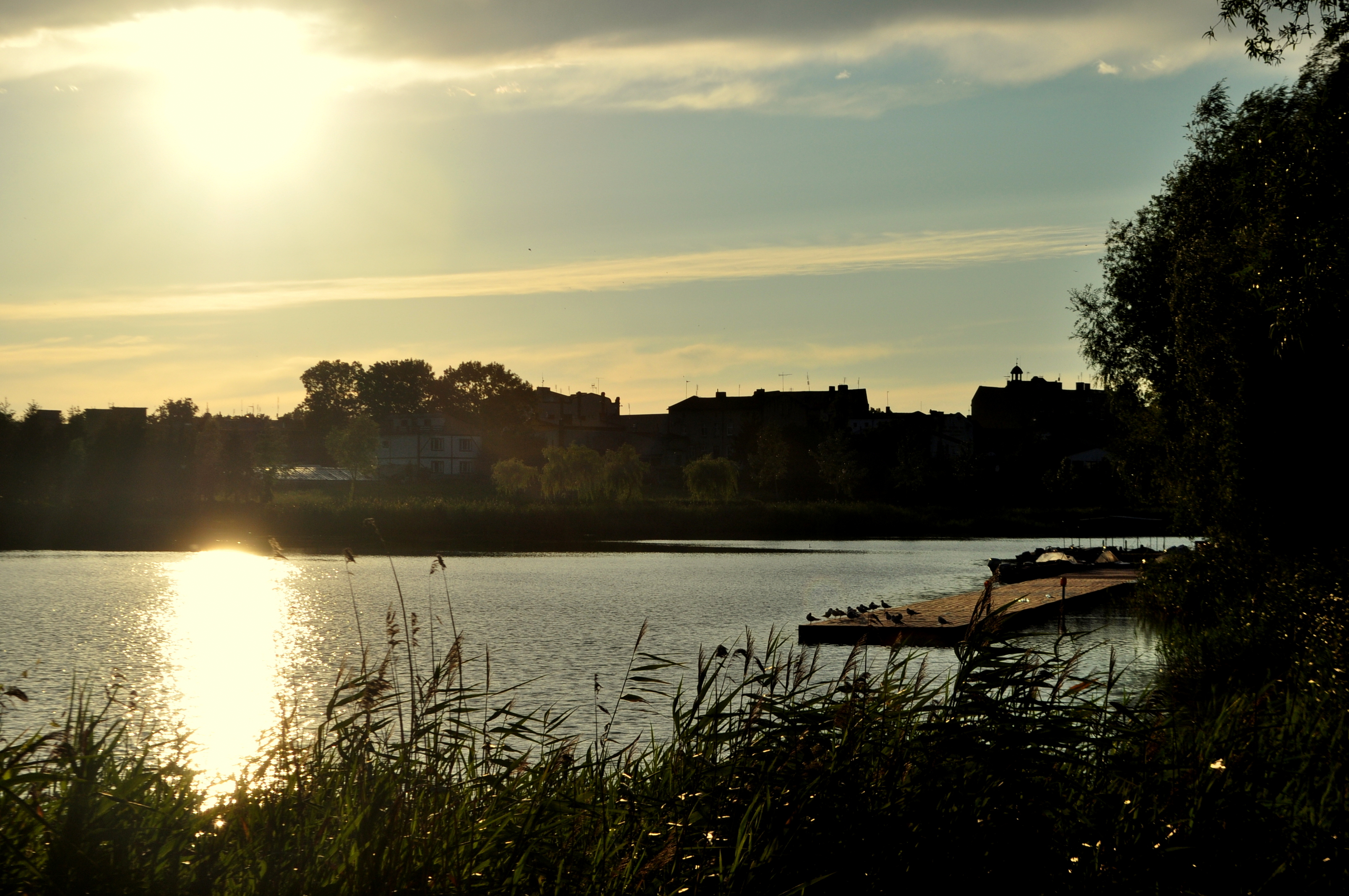
- Modern–day Gopło
Date	1096
Location	Gopło
Result	Sieciech–loyal victory

Belligerents
Sieciech–loyal forces	Zbigniew–loyal forces

Commanders and leaders
Sieciech	Zbigniew (POW)

Casualties and losses
Few	Unknown

The Battle of Gopło was a battle, part of the Civil War in Poland, which took place in 1096 near Gopło. It was fought between the troops of king Władysław Herman against the inhabitants of Kruszwica led by the king's son Zbigniew.

== Prelude ==
After his father's death, Władysław Herman resided in Płock, managing Masovia. Zbigniew was the first–born son of Władysław. It's assumed he was born around 1070–1073. His mother was Przecława, although her and Władysław were not married. However, this initially did not constitute any obstacle to Zbigniew's rights. The situation changed when King Bolesław the Bold, Władysław's brother, was exiled from the country. Then, unexpectedly, Władysław became the superior prince.

Almost immediately, in the name of a political alliance with the Duchy of Bohemia, in 1080 he took Judith Premyslid as his wife. She was the daughter of Vratislaus II, the ruler of Bohemia. The further fate of Przecława is unknown. When, after several years of marriage, Judith gave birth to a boy in 1086, Zbigniew's situation became complicated. Zbigniew, although being the prince's firstborn son, came from outside the church. Judyta wanted her son to become Herman's future successor. This caused Zbigniew to be sent to the cathedral school in Kraków in 1086, and three years later to the monastery in Quedlinburg. This was to remove him from the inheritance in favor of Bolesław.

The situation changed when a serious internal crisis began in Poland. It had several causes. The most important of them was Sieciech's rule. It was the palatine of Władysław Herman, who gained such a strong position in the country that he managed to rule Poland. He appointed candidates who were his supporters in all offices. However, he dealt with his rivals very bloodily. Additionally, the country was shaken in 1089 by the death of Bolesław the Bold's son, Mieszko Bolesławowic. It is thought that he was poisoned by Sieciech so that he would not pose even an illusory threat to Sieciech's position. All this led to the fact that the opponents of the all-powerful palatine began to unite. Over time, Sieciech had more and more enemies.

In 1093, the conspirators decided to start a rebellion in Silesia due to the failure of the Wrocław talks (revolt in Silesia in 1093) and the Czech invasion, forcing the palatine and the prince to take military action, resulting in a civil war. In order to legitimise their actions, they brought Zbigniew from Quedlinburg as they saw him as an important asset in the fight against Sieciech. The rebels were joined by the castellan of Wrocław, Magnus, proving that public dissatisfaction with the rule of Herman, or rather Sieciech, was widespread.

Initially, Herman gave in and recognized Zbigniew's rights, but this was met with opposition from Sieciech. He was dissatisfied with the restoration of Zbigniew's rights, started a campaign to reverse this decision. Sieciech acted against both Herman and Zbigniew.

Very quickly, Sieciech, either through bribery or threats, managed to convince most of the previously rebellious nobles to return to his side. However, some of the troops stayed loyal to Zbigniew.

== Battle ==
It was a decisive and bloody battle, where the troops of Zbigniew's supporters suffered a defeat. Zbigniew was captured and became a prisoner in Sieciechów.

== Aftermath ==
Seven poorly armed infantry units and auxiliary troops from Pomerania were cut down and the town was razed to the ground.

The nobles treated Władysław as a rightful member of the dynasty, but the clergy considered Zbigniew an illegitimate child.

Zbigniew was released after the intercession of bishops and many nobles in 1097. He was also re-granted his rights.

From the end of the 11th century to the mid-12th century, Kruszwica was the seat of the Bishopric of Kujawy. It received city rights in 1422.

== Legacy ==
On the shore of Gopło now stands a forgotten cemetery of the defeated warriors.

There is even said to be a legend where the transport of building materials is to be associated with the bloody battle.

The legend from Gallus Anonymus says:

"And Zbigniew, seeing that the leaders had fallen away from the city both inside and outside, realising that it was a dangerous thing to rebel against the authorities, having doubted the loyalty of the common people and their own lives, escaped at night and entered the town of Kruszwica, rich in knights, and was gladly welcomed by the inhabitants. However, the father, fearing that Zbigniew had escaped so unpunished and that the people of Kruszwica had accepted him, thus acting against him, set out with the same army in pursuit of the escaping Zbigniew and with all his forces approached the Kruszwica stronghold. Zbigniew, having summoned the help of a large force of pagans and having seven formations of Kruszwica inhabitants, left the town and fought with Prince Władysław; but the Just Judge decided the case between father and son. It was a war worse than a civil war, where son against father and brother against brother raised criminal weapons. There - I believe it - the unfortunate Zbigniew deserved the father's curse that awaited him in the future; there, too, Almighty God showed Prince Władysław such great mercy that an innumerable number of opponents attacked him, and only a very few of his soldiers died. So much human blood was spilled there and such a mass of corpses fell into the lake adjacent to the town that from then on every good Christian was afraid to eat fish from that water. In this way, Kruszwica, which was once full of wealth and knights, was almost reduced to the appearance of a wasteland."

— Gallus Anonymus

== See also ==
- List of wars involving Poland
- Civil war in Poland
