= Skarbimir =

Awandaniec coat of arms

Skarbimir of the Clan Awdaniec (died before 1132) was a Medieval Polish magnate, tutor, advisor and count palatine of Polish monarch Bolesław III Wrymouth.

== Biography ==
=== Early life ===
Skarbimir was a son of Michal the Old of the Clan Abdank, one time comes, founder of a Benedictine monastery at Lubin. Very little is known of Skarbimir's childhood and early life. It is believed that in 1079 he along with his father traveled to Hungary accompanying the banished king Boleslaw II the Bold. He and his father are believed to have returned to Poland circa 1086 along with Mieszko Bolesławowic, the son of the banished monarch. Following the poisoning of Boleslawowic in 1089, the clan Abdank declared itself in the opposition of count palatine Sieciech who was believed to have ordered Mieszko Bolesławowic poisoned.

=== Political involvement ===
Skarbimir was politically active already during the reign of Władysław I Herman. Through his initiative, a popular assembly was organized in Wrocław, where Bolesław III Wrymouth and his brother Zbigniew united to fight against Count Palatine Sieciech. There, he swore an oath of allegiance to both sons of Władysław I Herman and ratified the removal from office of the current guardian of Boleslaw, a noble named Wojsław Powała, who was a relative of Sieciech. The campaign against Palatine Sieciech, the de facto ruler of Poland, was also decided upon by Skarbimir at the Wrocław meeting. As a consequence Skarbimir became the main advisor to Bolesław III, which led to him taking over the office of palatine of the Lesser Poland-Silesian Duchy following the death of Wladyslaw I Herman.

In 1103 as en envoy of Bolesław III Wrymouth, he negotiated with Bořivoj II of Bohemia, who allied himself with Zbigniew and invaded Silesia. Skarbimir was a proponent of anti-Bohemian foreign policy. It was likely with his help and influence that a successful invasion of Bohemia took place in 1105. He was very influential, to the point that he even minted his own coin. According to Jan Długosz in 1106 the Duke appointed him the prestigious office of Voivode of Kraków. He remained Bolesław III Wrymouth’s faithful servant until 1117 when under unclear circumstances he rebelled against the Duke. The rebellion was suppressed, Skarbimir was captured and punished by being blinded.

=== Rebellion against the duke ===
The reason for the count palatine's rebellion of 1117–1118, though not clearly explained, is sometimes connected by historians to Bolesław III Wrymouth’s statute of succession. The problem with the principle of succession developed in 1115 when Leszek, Boleslaw's first son from his second marriage, was born. It is believed that Skarbimir was opposed to statutory regulation of royal inheritance. He believed that the choice of an heir should be decided by a council of magnates. Presumably he refused to pledge to abide by the decisions outlined in the statute of succession, for this he was removed from office and replaced as Count Palatine by Piotr Włostowic . At this point, it is supposed, Skarbimir began his mutiny against the monarch. He did not gain many supporters, however, and the uprising was defeated. The above explanation, however, is only a hypothesis due to a lack of primary sources on the matter.

=== Return to power and death ===
Towards the end of 1121 Piotr Włostowic was stripped of his title of count palatine, which was once again granted to Skarbimir. Skarbimir's return to the lead of Polish elites is testified by his name being the first secular dignitary mentioned on the document of Papal legate Giles of Tusculum issued between 1123 and 1125 as well as his mention in the Liber Fraternitatis of Lubin. Skarbimir died on April 16; the day of his death was noted in the Lubin Obituary Book entitled Liber Mortuorum Abbatiae Sanctae Mariae Lubinensis. The year of his death is not known. It is known that he died during the reign of Bolesław III Wrymouth, since at the time of Boleslaw’s death the office of count palatine was held once again by Piotr Włostowic. It is supposed therefore, that since Wlostowic is believed to have regained the office in 1132, then Skarbimir's death must have taken place beforehand, sometime in 1131. Skarbimir is believed to have had seven sons: Jaszczolt, Skarbimir, Przedwoj, Henryk, Szczedrzyk, Michal and Pakoslaw, as well as two daughters of unknown names.

== Bibliography ==
- Bieniak Janusz, Polska elita polityczna XII wieku, part II, Społeczeństwo Polski średniowiecznej, vol. 3, Warszawa 1985, pp. 13–74.
- Bieniak J., Skarbimir, Polski Słownik Biograficzny, vol. 38, 1997, pp. 27–31
- Gawlas Sławomir, O kształt zjednoczonego Królestwa, Warszawa 1996, pp. 77–78.
- Gąsiorowski Antoni, Skarbimir, Słownik Starożytności Słowiańskich, vol. 5, 1975, pp. 198.
- Szczur Stanisław, Historia Polski, średniowiecze, chapter 3, Drugie państwo piastowskie (pp. 103–204), Wydawnictwo Literackie 2002
