= St. Giles' Church, Inowłódz =

Church in Inowłódz, Poland

Coordinates: 51°31′38.29″N 20°13′38.4″E

St. Giles-Church in Inowłódz (Polish: Kościół św. Idziego, German: St. Ägidius) is a church in Poland. According to later inscription (presumably from 17th century) founded in 1082 by Władysław I Herman as thanks for birth of his son Bolesław III Wrymouth. Actually it was founded probably not later than in 1138 by Hemran's son, Bolesław III Wrymouth. The church was restored between 1924 and 1926 and thoroughly between 1936 and 1938 with raising of the tower by one storey. The restorations changed the architecture of the church.

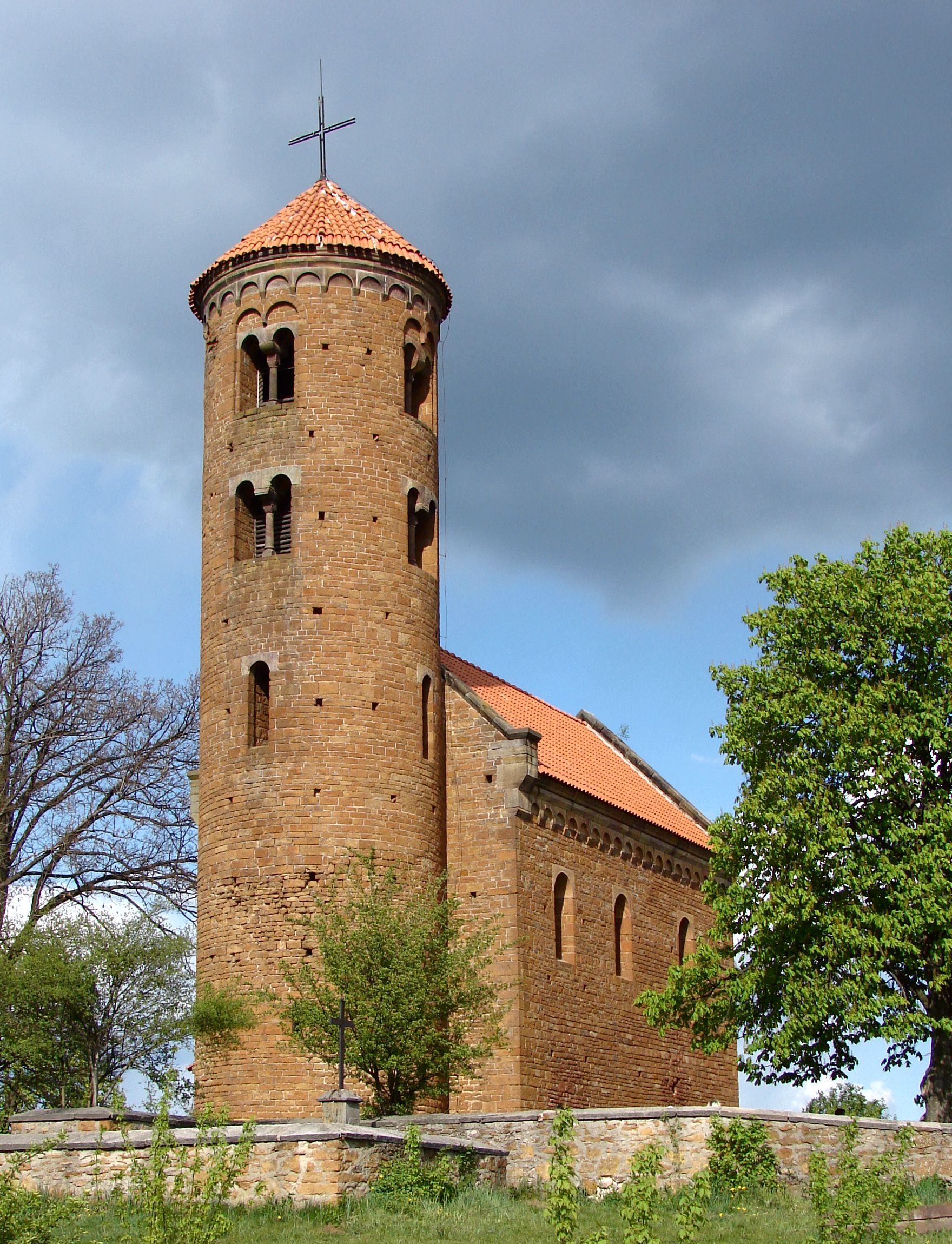
St. Giles-Church in Inowłódz.

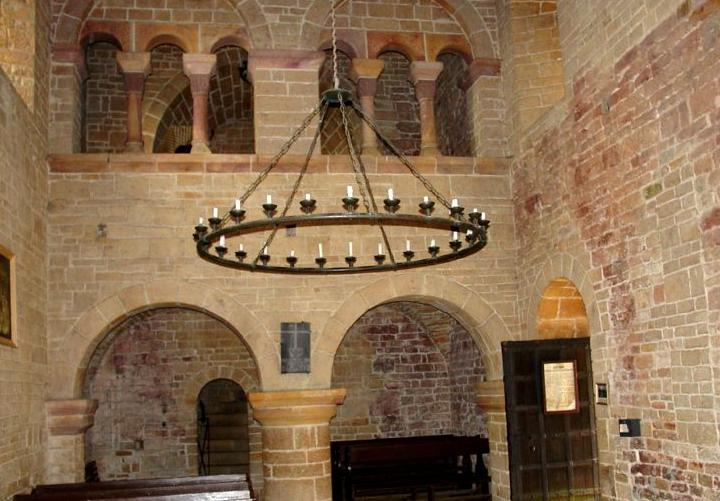
Interior view.

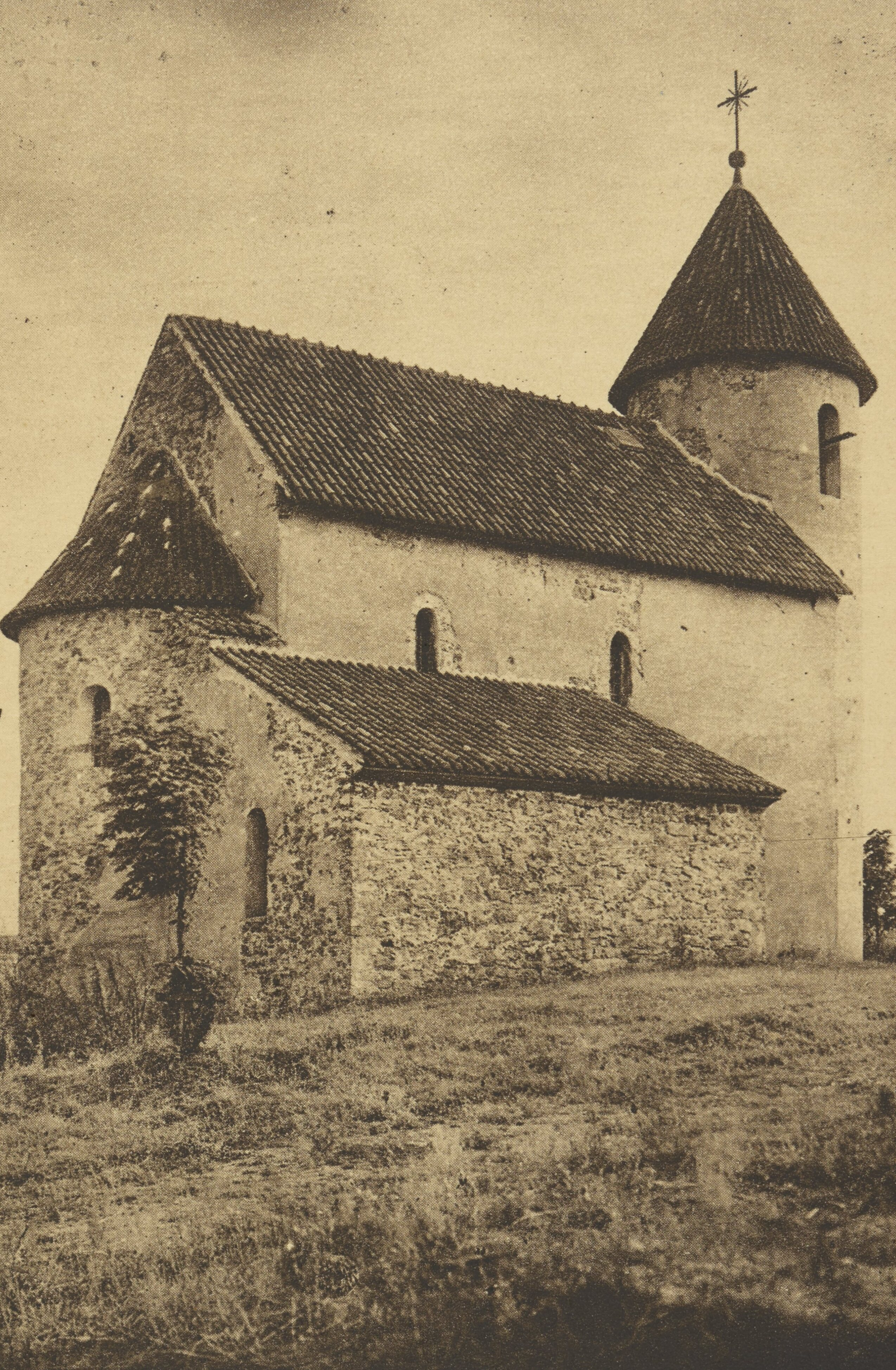
Church ca 1929.
