= Mieszko Bolesławowic =

11th-century Polish prince

- Prince of Kraków
- Born: c. 1069
- Died: 1089
- Noble family: Piast dynasty
- Spouse: Euphraxia of Turov
- Father: Bolesław II the Bold
- Mother: Unnamed

Mieszko Bolesławowic (c. 1069 – 1089) was the only son of Bolesław II the Generous, King of Poland. Mieszko was Prince of Kraków from 1086 until his death in 1089.

== Biography ==
Mieszko was, in all likelihood, born in Kraków sometime around or during A.D. 1069. He was the eldest son of the king of Poland Bolesław II the Bold and his wife. According to the Chronicler Gallus Anonymus, Mieszko was being groomed for the responsibilities of a monarch from an early age. At the age of ten, his father, Bolesław, was deposed by a rebellion led by his brother, Władysław I Herman. Mieszko was forced to leave his country and his education behind and seek refuge at the friendly court of Ladislaus I of Hungary. The king of Hungary was apparently very fond of young Mieszko and treated him like a son.

== Return to Poland ==
Following the death of his father in 1081, Mieszko remained in Hungary until 1086 when he is known to have returned to his homeland. There are two conflicting versions explaining the circumstances of this return. Chronicler Gallus Anonymus simply states that Mieszko was peacefully summoned to Poland by his uncle Władysław I Herman. It is likely that this was facilitated by a deal between Ladislaus I of Hungary and Władysław I Herman. Another version, publicized by a Hungarian chronicler, claims that in 1086 Ladislaus I of Hungary invaded the Kingdom of Poland, took control of Kraków, and installed Mieszko as its ruler.

== Prince of Kraków ==
Though there is no direct primary source evidence for this, notes in Kraków almanacs strongly suggest that during the years 1086–1089 Mieszko was prince of Kraków. However, sometime during this time he accepted over-lordship of his uncle Wladyslaw I Herman, and gave up his hereditary claim to the crown of Poland in exchange for becoming first in line to succeed him. It is also during this time (1088) that he married a Turov princess (from Ruthenia) Euphraxia of Turov, a daughter of Izyaslav I and Gertrude of Poland.

== Death ==
According to Gallus Anonymus the young prince was poisoned during a feast, possibly on orders of palatine Sieciech (who as Gallus Anonymus wrote wanted to "kill off the entire Piast dynasty") in Kraków in 1089. The death of Mieszko, the rightful pretender to the throne, allowed Władysław to strengthen his rule over Poland; Sieciech, after failed attempts to kill all of Władysław's sons, would be exiled.
