= Sieciech =

Polish magnate and statesman

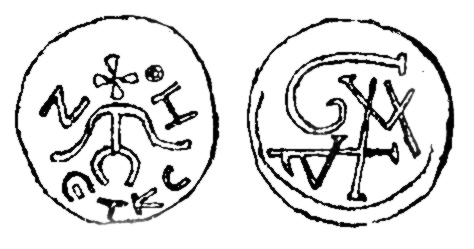
Denarius of Sieciech with what appears to be his personal coat of arms

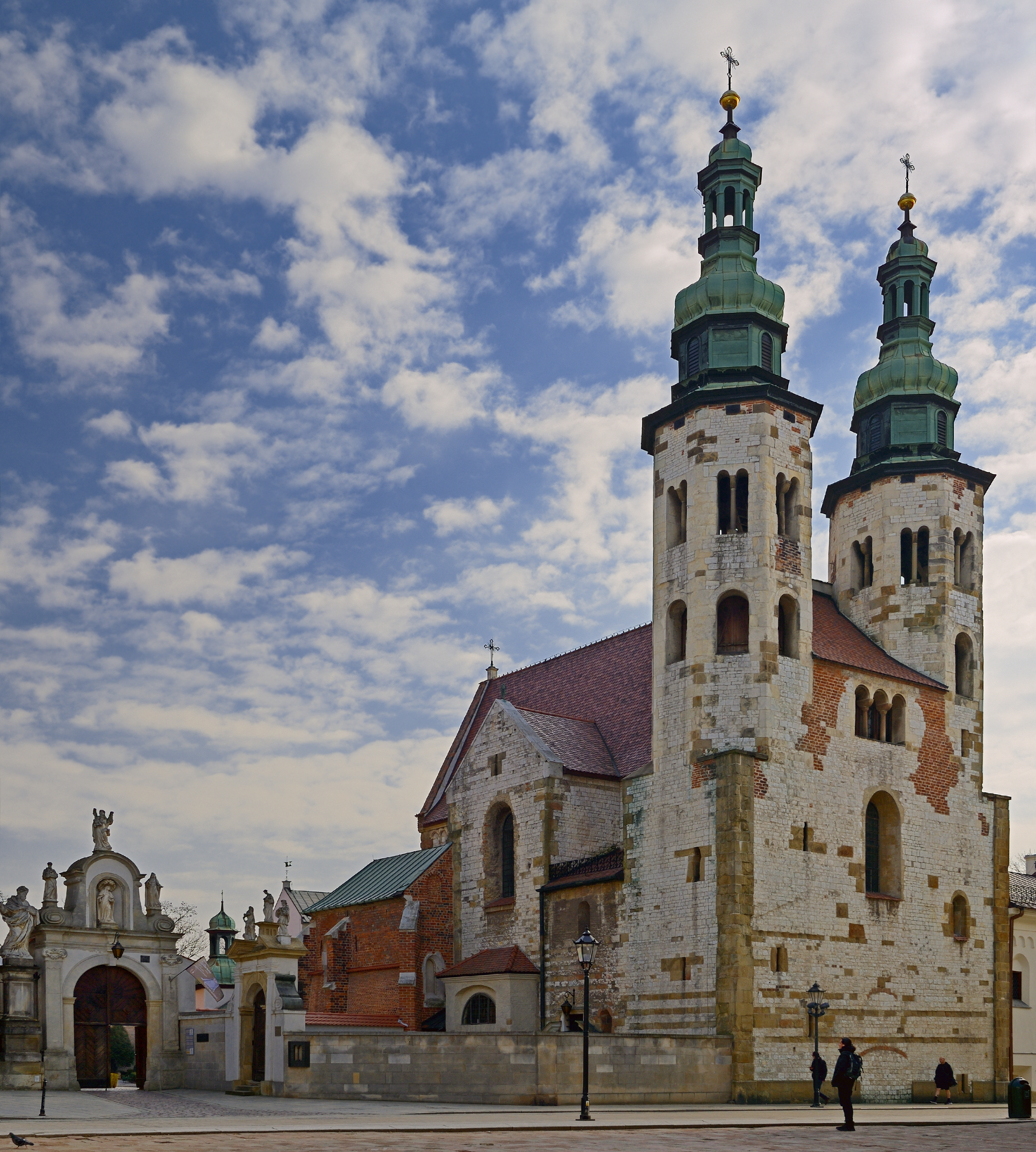
Saint Andrew's Church in Kraków, founded by Sieciech

Sieciech (mid 11th century AD – early 12th century AD) was a medieval Polish magnate and statesman.

== Biography ==
All information about Sieciech has come down from the chronicler Gallus Anonymus. He was a count palatine at the court of duke Władysław I Herman of Poland. Though the exact dates of his birth and death are unknown, he is said by Gallus Anonymus to have lived in the second half of the 11th century. During his time as count, Sieciech was the de facto ruler of Poland. He wielded such extensive authority throughout the realm that he even minted his own coins. According to Gallus Anonymus, Sieciech ruled heavy-handedly.

His alleged despotic conduct resulted in a number of nobles (especially those from Silesia) being forced to leave the country. Sieciech is credited with ordering the poisoning of Boleslaw II's son, Mieszko. He is also thought to have attempted to rid himself of the two sons of Władysław I Herman in attempt to gain the throne. Sieciech is known to have founded the Romanesque Saint Andrews church in Kraków.

Sieciech made a large number of enemies among the Polish nobility. The disgruntled nobles sought to limit his influence by proposing that the country should be divided between Władysław I Herman and his sons Zbigniew and Boleslaw III Wrymouth. His influence began to wane when the sons of Władysław I Herman demanded to be granted their own districts. They also demanded that Sieciech be removed from positions of influence.

Their wishes were granted when in 1100 Sieciech was stripped of his land and titles by Wladyslaw I Herman and banished from the country. According to Gallus Anonymus Sieciech managed to return to Poland before his death.

The town of Sieciechów (Castrum Sethei), judging by Gallus, was named after Sieciech (Setheus).
