= List of armed conflicts involving Poland against Germany =

Poland and Germany have been in many armed conflicts against each other. These include conflicts such as Polish–Teutonic Wars, Silesian Uprisings and World War II. This does include Polish and German intervention in wars such as the Lithuanian Civil War or the Zamość uprising.

Polish or Polish–Lithuanian victory

German, Brandenburger, Teutonic or Prussian victory

Another result (Result unknown or indecisive, Status quo ante bellum, treaty or peace without a clear result or an internal conflict inside Poland or Germany in which the other intervened)

== Civitas Schinesghe against the Holy Roman Empire (963–1018) ==
| Year | Conflict | Polish side | German side | Result |
|---|---|---|---|---|
| 963 | Gero's raid on Poland Part of the German–Polish Wars | Civitas Schinesghe | Saxon Eastern March | German victory |
| 972 | Battle of Cedynia Part of the German–Polish Wars Location: Cedynia, present–day Poland | Civitas Schinesghe | Saxon Eastern March | Polish victory |
| 979–980 | Otto II's raid on Poland Part of the German–Polish Wars Location: Poznań, Greater Poland | Civitas Schinesghe | Holy Roman Empire | Polish victory |
| 1003–1005 | German-Polish War Part of the German–Polish War (1003–1018) Location: Bohemia, Lusatia, Margravate of Meissen, Upper Lusatia | Civitas Schinesghe | Holy Roman Empire: Duchy of Bohemia; Veleti | German victory: Peace of Poznań (1005); Civitas Schinesghe loses Bohemia, Upper Lusatia and Lower Lusatia |
| 1007–1013 | German-Polish War Part of the German–Polish War (1003–1018) Location: Lubusz Land, Lusatia, Elbe Valley | Civitas Schinesghe | Holy Roman Empire | Polish victory: Peace of Merseburg (1013) |
| 1015–1018 | German-Polish War Part of the German–Polish War (1003–1018) Location: Lusatia, Meissen, Bohemia, Greater Poland, Silesia | Civitas Schinesghe: Moravians | Holy Roman Empire: Duchy of Bohemia; Margraviate of Austria; Veleti | Polish victory: Peace of Bautzen (1018); Poland is granted control over Lusatia and Upper Lusatia; The Duchy of Bohemia becomes an Imperial Estate of the Holy Roman Empire |

== Kingdom of Poland against the Holy Roman Empire (1028–1348) ==
| Year | Conflict | Polish side | German side | Result |
|---|---|---|---|---|
| 1028–1031 | German–Polish War Part of the German–Polish Wars Location: Lusatia, Moravia, Saxony, Poland, Red Ruthenia | Kingdom of Poland Kingdom of Hungary (1029–1031) | Holy Roman Empire: Duchy of Saxony; Duchy of Bohemia (from 1029); Kievan Rus' (from 1030) Kingdom of Hungary (1031) | German–Rus' victory |
| 1060 | Hungarian succession crisis Location: Moson County | Kingdom of Poland Kingdom of Hungary (Bela's supporters) | Holy Roman Empire Duchy of Bohemia Kingdom of Hungary (Andrew's supporters) | Bela–allied victory |
| 1077 | Hungarian succession crisis | Kingdom of Poland Kingdom of Hungary (Ladislaus' supporters) | Holy Roman Empire Kingdom of Hungary (Solomon's supporters) | Ladislaus–allied victory |
| 1109 | Henry V's expedition to Poland Part of the German-Polish Wars Location: Oder River, Silesia | Kingdom of Poland | Holy Roman Empire Duchy of Bohemia | Polish victory |
| 1132 | Bolesław III's expedition to Hungary Location: Sajó | Duchy of Poland Kievan Rus Hungarian Opposition | Kingdom of Hungary Duchy of Bohemia Duchy of Austria Holy Roman Empire | Bela II-allied victory |
| 1157 | Frederick I's expedition to Głogów Part of the German–Polish Wars Location: Głogów, Poznań, Greater Poland | Kingdom of Poland Cumania Old Prussians | Holy Roman Empire Duchy of Bohemia | German victory: Peace of Krzyszkowo (1157) |
| 1345–1348 | Polish–Bohemian War Location: Silesia, Lesser Poland | Kingdom of Poland | Kingdom of Bohemia Holy Roman Empire | Inconclusive: Treaty of Namysłów (1348) |

== Kingdom of Poland against the Margraviate of Brandenburg (1209–1427) ==
| Year | Conflict | Polish side | German side | Result |
|---|---|---|---|---|
| 1209–1211 | Battle of Lubusz Location: Lubusz Land, Kingdom of Poland | Duchy of Silesia Duchy of Greater Poland | Margraviate of Brandenburg | Polish victory |
| 1225–1229 | Second war for Lubusz | Kingdom of Poland | Margraviate of Brandenburg | Polish victory |
| 1238–1240 | Battle of Lubusz Location: Lubusz Land, Kingdom of Poland | Duchy of Silesia | Margraviate of Brandenburg | Polish victory |
| 1296 | Brandenburgian Raid on Rogozno | Kingdom of Poland | Margraviate of Brandenburg | German victory: Death of Przemysł II |
| 1326 | Raid on Brandenburg Location: Neumark, East Brandenburg | Grand Duchy of Lithuania Kingdom of Poland | Margraviate of Brandenburg | Polish-Lithuanian victory: Area looted and devastated; 6,000 prisoners taken |
| 1316 | Polish–Brandenburg conflict | Kingdom of Poland | Margraviate of Brandenburg | Polish victory |
| 1425–1427 | Uckermark War Location: Uckermark, Brandenburg | Pomerania-Stettin Pomerania-Wolgast Pomerania-Stolp Pomerania-Stargard Mecklenburg-Stargard Kingdom of Poland Werle (1425–1426) | Margraviate of Brandenburg | Allied victory: Pomerania-Stettin gains a few towns |

== Kingdom of Poland against the Teutonic Order (1308–1521) ==
| Year | Conflict | Polish side | German side | Result |
|---|---|---|---|---|
| 1308 | Teutonic takeover of Danzig Part of the Polish–Teutonic Wars Location: Danzig (Gdańsk) | Kingdom of Poland | Teutonic Order | Teutonic victory: Expansion of the Teutonic Order; Start of the Polish–Teutonic Wars; Poland landlocked from the Baltic Sea; Massacre of inhabitants by Teutonic Order; Germanisation of the region |
| 1326–1332 | Polish–Teutonic War Part of the Polish–Teutonic Wars Location: Kuyavia, Kulmerland | Kingdom of Poland Grand Duchy of Lithuania Kingdom of Hungary | Teutonic Order Kingdom of Bohemia Duchy of Masovia Holy Roman Empire | Teutonic military victory: Treaty of Kalisz (1343) |
| 1389–1392 | Lithuanian Civil War Part of the Vytautas–Jogaila power struggle Location: Prussia, Grand Duchy of Lithuania | Grand Duchy of Lithuania Kingdom of Poland | Teutonic Order Samogitia Rus' principalities | Inconclusive: Ostrów Agreement (1392); Władysław II Jagiełło was designated Supreme Duke of Lithuania; Vytautas was designated Grand Duke of Lithuania |
| 1409–1411 | Polish–Lithuanian–Teutonic War Part of the Polish–Teutonic Wars Location: Baltic coast | Kingdom of Poland Grand Duchy of Lithuania Golden Horde | Teutonic Order Kingdom of Denmark Holy Roman Empire | Polish–Lithuanian victory: Peace of Thorn (1411); Decline of the Teutonic Order |
| 1414 | Hunger War Part of the Polish–Teutonic Wars Location: State of the Teutonic Order | Kingdom of Poland Grand Duchy of Lithuania | Teutonic Order | Mediation at the Council of Constance: Treaty of Strasburg (1414) |
| 1419 | Retreat Expedition | Kingdom of Poland | Teutonic Order | Initial Polish victory Cancelling of invasion afterwards |
| 1422 | Golub War Part of the Polish–Teutonic Wars and the Lithuanian Crusade Location: Chełmno Land in the State of the Teutonic Order | Kingdom of Poland Grand Duchy of Lithuania Principality of Moldavia | Teutonic Order: Mercenaries; Various knights from the rest of Europe | Polish victory: Treaty of Melno (1422) |
| 1431–1435 | Polish–Teutonic War Part of the Polish–Teutonic Wars Location: State of the Teutonic Order | Kingdom of Poland; Duchy of Stolp; Orphans (Hussite mercenaries); Principality of Moldavia | Teutonic Order; Bohemian mercenaries | Polish victory: Peace of Brześć Kujawski (1435); Further decline of the Teutonic Order |
| 1432–1438 | Lithuanian Civil War Location: Grand Duchy of Lithuania | Grand Duchy of Lithuania (Švitrigaila's supporters) Teutonic Order Golden Horde Principality of Moldavia | Grand Duchy of Lithuania (Sigismund's supporters) Kingdom of Poland Orphans (Hussite mercenaries) | Švitrigaila's defeat: Švitrigaila withdraws to Moldavia (1438) |
| 1438–1439 | War of Bohemian succession Location: Lands of the Bohemian Crown | Kingdom of Poland; Hussites | Electorate of Saxony; Kingdom of Germany; Kingdom of Bohemia | Albert II-allied victory |
| 1454–1466 | Thirteen Years' War Part of the Polish–Teutonic Wars Location: Pomerelia, Prussia, Baltic Sea | Kingdom of Poland; Prussian Confederation | Teutonic Order; Denmark; Livonian Order; Amsterdam; Duchy of Żagań | Polish victory: Second Peace of Thorn (1466); Teutonic Order becomes a vassal of Kingdom of Poland; Teutonic Order returns Eastern Pomerania to Poland; Teutonic Order cedes the bishopric of Warmia; Both lands become Royal Prussia under direct rule of Kingdom of Poland |
| 1467–1479 | War of the Priests Part of the Polish–Teutonic Wars Location: Warmia | Kingdom of Poland | Teutonic Order Diocese of Warmia | Polish victory: Treaty of Piotrków (1479) |
| 1519–1521 | Polish–Teutonic War Part of the Polish–Teutonic Wars Location: State of the Teutonic Order | Kingdom of Poland | Teutonic Order | Polish victory: Treaty of Kraków (1525) |

== Polish-Lithuanian Commonwealth against Prussia (1794) ==
| Year | Conflict | Polish side | German side | Result |
|---|---|---|---|---|
| 1794 | Kościuszko Uprising: Greater Poland Uprising (1794); Part of the Partitions of Poland and Polish–Russian Wars Location: Polish–Lithuanian Commonwealth, Prussian Partition (Greater Poland and Kuyavia), Russian Partition | Polish–Lithuanian Commonwealth | Russian Empire Prussia | Prussian–Russian victory: Third Partition of Poland; Disappearance of Polish–Lithuanian Commonwealth |

== Duchy of Warsaw against Prussia (1806–1815) ==
| Year | Conflict | Polish side | German side | Result |
|---|---|---|---|---|
| 1806 | Greater Poland Uprising Part of the War of the Fourth Coalition Location: Greater Poland | (France) First French Empire Duchy of Warsaw | Kingdom of Prussia | Franco–Polish victory: Treaties of Tilsit (1807) |
| 1812–1814 | War of the Sixth Coalition Part of the Napoleonic Wars and Coalition Wars Location: Central and Eastern Europe, the Low Countries, France | Original coalition: Russia; Prussia; Spain; United Kingdom; Hanover; (Grand Duchy of Mecklenburg-Schwerin) Mecklenburg-Schwerin; Portugal; Sardinia; Sicily; Sweden; After the Armistice of Pläswitz: Austria; Bavaria; After the Battle of Leipzig: (Grand Duchy of Baden) Baden; Liechtenstein; Saxony; Württemberg; After 20 November 1813 (Sovereign Principality of the United Netherlands) Netherlands After January 1814 Denmark | France: Duchy of Warsaw; Italy; Naples; Until January 1814: Confederation of the Rhine (many member states defected after Battle of Leipzig); Denmark–Norway; Co-belligerent: United States (War of 1812 only) | Coalition victory: End of Napoleon's empire; Napoleon sent into exile; Treaty of Fontainebleau (1814); Treaty of Paris (1814) |

== Polish insurgents against Prussia (1848) ==
| Year | Conflict | Polish side | German side | Result |
|---|---|---|---|---|
| 1848 | Greater Poland Uprising Part of the Revolutions of 1848 Location: Prussian Partition (Grand Duchy of Posen and former West Prussia), Silesia | Polish independence movement | Prussia: Prussian Army and German colonists militia | Prussian victory: Autonomy of Grand Duchy of Posen removed, Posen transformed into the Province of Posen |

== Second Polish Republic against Weimar Republic (1918–1921) ==
| Year | Conflict | Polish side | German side | Result |
|---|---|---|---|---|
| 1918–1919 | Greater Poland Uprising Part of the Aftermath of World War I Location: Greater Poland | Polish insurgents Second Polish Republic | Weimar Republic | Polish victory: Poland gains provinces of Posen and West Prussia; Poland gains eastern Upper Silesia and the area of Działdowo |
| 1919 | First Silesian Uprising Part of the Aftermath of World War I and Silesian Uprisings Location: Parts of Upper Silesia | Polish insurgents Second Polish Republic | Weimar Republic | German victory: Rebellion suppressed |
| 1920 | Second Silesian Uprising Part of the Aftermath of World War I and Silesian Uprisings Location: Upper Silesia | Polish insurgents Second Polish Republic | Weimar Republic | Polish victory |
| 1921 | Third Silesian Uprising Part of the Aftermath of World War I and Silesian Uprisings Location: Upper Silesia | Polish insurgents Second Polish Republic | Weimar Republic | League of Nations forces a ceasefire |

== Polish Underground State against Nazi Germany (1939–1945) ==
| Year | Conflict | Polish side | German side | Result |
|---|---|---|---|---|
| 1939 | Jabłonków incident Part of the Causes of World War II Location: Jablunkov Pass, in modern-day Czech Republic | Second Polish Republic | Nazi Germany | Polish victory: Acceleration of Polish mobilisation; Transfer of most of operational aircraft of the Polish Air Force to secondary airfields |
| 1939 | Invasion of Poland Part of the European theatre of World War II Location: Second Polish Republic, eastern Germany, Free City of Danzig (modern-day Gdańsk) | Second Polish Republic | Nazi Germany Slovakia Soviet Union | German–Soviet–Slovak victory: Polish territory divided among Germany, Lithuania, Soviet Union and Slovakia; Danzig annexed by Nazi Germany; Kresy annexed by the Soviet Union; Vilnius region granted to Lithuania |
| 1939–1945 | World War II Location: Europe; Pacific; Atlantic; Indian Ocean; South-East Asia; China; Japan; Middle East; Mediterranean; North Africa; Horn of Africa; Central Africa; Australia; Caribbean; North and South America | Allies of World War II Including: Polish Underground State | Axis powers Including: Nazi Germany | Allied victory: Collapse of Nazi Germany |

== See also ==
- War of the Polish Succession – loyal to Augustus III forces victory (including Prussia)
- Battles for Vilnius (1918–1919)
- List of wars involving Poland – chronological list of wars involving Poland
- List of wars involving Germany – chronological list of wars involving Germany
- List of wars involving Russia – chronological list of wars involving Russia
- List of wars involving France – chronological list of wars involving France
- List of wars involving Slovakia – chronological list of wars involving Slovakia
- List of wars involving Lithuania – chronological list of wars involving Lithuania
- List of wars involving the Czech lands – chronological list of wars involving the Czech lands
- Russo-Polish Wars – wars between Poland and Russia over their history
- Treaty of Versailles – most important treaty ending World War I
- History of Poland
- History of Germany
