= Invasion of Poland (disambiguation) =

Invasion of Poland may refer to:

10th century invasions of Poland:

- (972) Battle of Cedynia, invasion by Odo I, Margrave of the Saxon Ostmark

11th century invasions of Poland:

- (1028–1031) German–Polish War, invasion by Conrad II
- (1038–1039) Bretislav's invasion, invasion by Bretislav I

12th century invasions of Poland:

- (1109) Henry V's expedition to Poland, invasion by Henry V
- (1157) Frederick I's expedition to Głogów, invasion by Frederick I Barbarossa

13th century invasions of Poland:

- (1205) Battle of Zawichost, invasion by Roman the Great
- (1209) Battle of Lubusz (1209), invasion by Conrad II, Margrave of Lusatia
- (1240–1241) First Mongol invasion, invasion by Subutai
- (1259–1260) Second Mongol invasion, invasion by Nogai Khan
- (1287–1288) Third Mongol invasion, invasion by Talabuga Khan

14th century invasions of Poland:

- (1308) Teutonic takeover of Danzig (Gdańsk), invasion by Heinrich von Plötzke
- (1376) Lithuanian raid on Poland, invasion by Kęstutis

15th century invasions of Poland:

- (1409–1411) Polish–Lithuanian — Teutonic War, invasion by Ulrich von Jungingen
- (1431–1435) Polish — Teutonic War, invasion by Paul von Rusdorf
- (1454–1466) Thirteen Years' War, invasion by Bernard Szumborski
- (1467–1479) War of the Priests (Poland), invasion by Heinrich Reffle von Richtenberg

16th century invasions of Poland:

- (1502–1510) Moldavian–Polish War, invasion by Bogdan III the One-Eyed
- (1512) Battle of Wisniowiec, invasion by Meñli I Giray
- (1530–1538) Moldavian–Polish War, invasion by Petru Rareș
- (1558–1583) Livonian War, invasion by Ivan IV the Terrible
- (1563–1570) Northern Seven Years' War, invasion by Eric XIV
- (1587–1588) War of the Polish Succession, invasion by Maxilmilian III of Austria

17th century invasions of Poland:

- (1600–1611) Polish–Swedish War, invasion by Charles IX
- (1606) Battle of Udycz, invasion by Khan Temir
- (1617–1618) Polish–Swedish War, invasion by Gustavus Adolphus
- (1620–1621) Polish–Ottoman War, invasion by Osman II
- (1621–1625) Polish–Swedish War, invasion by Gustavus Adolphus
- (1624) Battle of Martynów, invasion by Khan Temir
- (1626–1629) Polish–Swedish War, invasion by Gustavus Adolphus
- (1632–1634) Smolensk War, invasion by Mikhail Shein
- (1633–1634) Polish–Ottoman War, invasion by Abaza Mehmed Pasha
- (1644) Battle of Ochmatów, invasion by Tugay Bey
- (1654–1667) Russo-Polish War, invasion by Aleksey Trubetskoy
- (1655–1660) Second Northern War, invasion by Charles X Gustav
- (1666–1671) Polish — Cossack–Tatar War, invasion by Petro Doroshenko
- (1672–1676) Polish–Ottoman War, invasion by Mehmed IV

18th century invasion:

- (1700–1721) Great Northern War, invasion by Peter the Great and Charles XII
- (1701–1706) Swedish invasion, invasion by Charles XII
- (1715–1716) Tarnogród Confederation, invasion by Peter the Great and Augustus II the Strong
- (1733–1735) War of the Polish Succession, invasion by Peter Lacy
- (1768–1769) Koliivshchyna, invasion by Maksym Zalizniak
- (1768–1772) Bar Confederation, invasion by Alexander Suvorov
- (1772) First Partition of Poland, invasion by Frederick the Great and Catherine II
- (1792) Polish–Russian War of 1792, invasion by Mikhail Krechetnikov
- (1793) Second Partition of Poland, invasion by Catherine II
- (1795) Third Partition of Poland, invasion by Catherine II and Frederick William II

19th century invasions of Poland:

- (1809) Austro-Polish War, invasion by Archduke Ferdinand Karl Joseph of Austria-Este

20th century invasions of Poland:

- (1905–1907) Revolution in the Kingdom of Poland, invasion by Sergei Witte
- (1918–1919) Polish–Ukrainian War, invasion by Yevhen Petrushevych
- (1919–1921) Polish–Soviet War, invasion by Vladimir Lenin
- (1939) Invasion of Poland, invasion by Adolf Hitler, Joseph Stalin and Ferdinand Čatloš
- (1945) Vistula–Oder offensive, invasion by Georgy Zhukov
