= Lubusz (disambiguation) =

Lubusz most often refers to Lebus and Lubusz Voivodeship.

Lubusz may also refer to:

- Battle of Lubusz (1239), medieval conflict
- Diocese of Lebus, former Catholic jurisdiction in Germany and Poland
- Duchy of Lubusz, former duchy of medieval Poland
- Nowy Lubusz, village in Lubusz Voivodeship, Poland
- Lubusz and West Pomeranian, European parliament constituency
- Lubusz Land, historical region in Poland and Germany
- Lubusz Voivodeship Sejmik, regional assembly of Lubusz Voivodeship
- Polregio (Lubusz), rail operator serving Lubusz Voivodeship, Poland

== See also ==
- Category:Geography of Lubusz Voivodeship
