= List of wars involving Germany =

This is a list of wars involving Germany from 843. It includes East Francia (Kingdom of Germany), Holy Roman Empire, Confederation of the Rhine, the German Confederation, the North German Confederation, the German Empire, the Weimar Republic, Nazi Germany, the German Democratic Republic (DDR, "East Germany") and the present Federal Republic of Germany (BRD, until German reunification in 1990 known as "West Germany").

Victory of Germany (and allies)
Defeat of Germany (and allies)
Another result*
Ongoing conflict

*e.g. result unknown or indecisive/inconclusive, result of internal conflict inside Germany, status quo ante bellum, or a treaty or peace without a clear result.

== Kingdom of Germany (843–962) ==
Conflict	Belligerents		Outcome	King
Conflict	Germany & allies	Opposition	Outcome	King
Viking raids in the Rhineland (843–885)	Carolingian Empire: Kingdom of Germany	Vikings	Victory	Louis the German
Battle of Andernach (876)	Kingdom of Germany	West Francia	Victory	Louis the Younger
Siege of Paris (885-886)	Carolingian Empire: Kingdom of Germany; West Francia	Vikings	Victory	Charles the Fat
Battle of Leuven (891)	Kingdom of Germany	Vikings	Victory	Arnulf of Carinthia
Battle of Pressburg (907)	Kingdom of Germany	Principality of Hungary	Defeat	Louis the Child
Battle of Eisenach (908)	Kingdom of Germany	Principality of Hungary	Defeat	Louis the Child
Battle of Rednitz (910)	Kingdom of Germany	Principality of Hungary	Defeat	Louis the Child
Battle of Lechfeld (910)	Kingdom of Germany	Principality of Hungary	Defeat	Louis the Child
Battle of the Inn (913)	Kingdom of Germany: Duchy of Bavaria; Duchy of Swabia	Principality of Hungary	Victory	Conrad I of Germany
Battle of Püchen (919)	Kingdom of Germany	Principality of Hungary	Defeat	Henry the Fowler
Siege of Gana (929)	Kingdom of Germany	Glomacze	Victory	Henry the Fowler
Battle of Lenzen (929)	Kingdom of Germany: Duchy of Saxony	Redarii; Linonen	Victory	Henry the Fowler
Battle of Riade (933)	Kingdom of Germany	Principality of Hungary	Victory	Henry the Fowler
German–Bohemian War (935–950)	Kingdom of Germany	Duchy of Bohemia	Victory	Otto I
Battle of Birten (939)	Kingdom of Germany	Duchy of Lotharingia	Victory	Otto I
Battle of Andernach (939)	Kingdom of Germany	Duchy of Franconia; Duchy of Lotharingia	Victory: Rebellion crushed	Otto I
Battle of Wels (943)	Kingdom of Germany: Duchy of Bavaria	Principality of Hungary	Victory	Otto I
First Italian Expedition of Otto I (951–952)	Kingdom of Germany	Kingdom of Lombardy	Victory: Otto gets crowned King of the Lombards	Otto I
Battle on the Raxa (955)	Kingdom of Germany	Obotrites, Veleti, and allied Slavs	Victory	Otto I
Battle of Lechfeld (955)	Kingdom of Germany	Principality of Hungary	Victory: End of Magyar invasions in Europe	Otto I
Second Italian Expedition of Otto I (960–962)	Kingdom of Germany	Kingdom of Italy	Victory: Formation of the Holy Roman Empire	Otto I

== Holy Roman Empire (962–1806) ==
Conflict	Belligerents		Outcome	Emperor
Conflict	Holy Roman Empire & allies	Opposition	Outcome	Emperor
Otto I's raid on Poland (963)	Holy Roman Empire	Duchy of Poland	Victory	Otto I
Rebellion of Harald Bluetooth (974)	Holy Roman Empire; Norwegian Rebels	Kingdom of Denmark; Kingdom of Norway	Victory	Otto II
Olaf Tryggvason's raid on Saksland	Holy Roman Empire	Norwegian vikings	Defeat	Otto II
Franco-German War of 978–980	Holy Roman Empire	West Francia	Defeat	Otto II
Otto II's raid on Poland (979)	Holy Roman Empire	Civitas Schinesghe	Defeat	Otto II
Battle of Stilo (982)	Holy Roman Empire	Fatimid Caliphate: Emirate of Sicily	Defeat	Otto II
Slavic revolt of 983	Holy Roman Empire	Wends Lutici Obotrite	Defeat	Otto II
Polish-Saxon Invasion of Veleti (985)	Duchy of Poland; Holy Roman Empire	Veleti	Victory	Otto III
Polish–Bohemian War (990)	Duchy of Poland; Holy Roman Empire	Duchy of Bohemia	Victory	Otto III
Polish-German invasion of Veleti (992)	Duchy of Poland; Holy Roman Empire	Veleti	Victory	Otto III
Polish-German invasion of Obotrites (995)	Duchy of Poland; Holy Roman Empire	Obotrites	Victory	Otto III
German–Polish War (1003–1018)	Holy Roman Empire	Duchy of Poland	Defeat (Peace of Bautzen): Poland is granted control over Lusatia and Upper Lusatia	Henry II
Bolesław I's intervention in the Kievan succession crisis (1015–1019)	Duchy of Poland Kingdom of Hungary (Holy Roman Empire) Holy Roman Empire; Pechenegs	Kievan Rus	Victory: Temporary victory for Sviatopolk and Boleslaw; Polish sack of Kiev	Henry II
German–Polish War (1028–1031)	Holy Roman Empire	Kingdom of Poland; Kingdom of Hungary	Victory	Conrad II
German–Hungarian War (1030–1031)	Holy Roman Empire	Kingdom of Hungary	Defeat: The Hungarians occupied Vienna	Conrad II
German-Hungarian Wars (1042–1043)	Holy Roman Empire	Kingdom of Hungary	Victory	Henry III
Henry III's military campaign against Hungary (1044)	Holy Roman Empire Peter Orseolo and his allies	The army of King Samuel Aba	Victory: Defeat of Samuel Aba, restoration of Peter	Henry III
War between King Peter and Prince Andrew (1046)	King Peter's army Holy Roman Empire	Prince Andrew's army Kievan Rus'	Defeat	Henry III
Emperor Henry III's military campaigns against Hungary: Siege of Pozsony; Battle of Vertes; (1051–1052)	Holy Roman Empire Duchy of Bohemia	Kingdom of Hungary	Defeat	Henry III
German-Hungarian border War (1056–1058)	Holy Roman Empire	Kingdom of Hungary	Stalemate: Treaty of Marchfeld	Henry IV
Civil War between King Andrew I and his brother, Prince Bela (1060)	King Andrew I's army Holy Roman Empire	Prince Béla's army Kingdom of Poland	Defeat	Henry IV
German invasion of Hungary (1063)	Holy Roman Empire: Duchy of Bavaria	Kingdom of Hungary	Victory: Death of Béla I; Ascension of Solomon to the Hungarian throne	Henry IV
Saxon revolt of 1073–1075	Holy Roman Empire	Duchy of Saxony	Victory: Rebellion suppressed	Henry IV
Saxon revolt of 1077–1088	Holy Roman Empire	German rebels: Duchy of Saxony; Duchy of Bavaria; County of Luxembourg	Victory	Henry IV
German-Flemish war	Holy Roman Empire	County of Flanders	Status quo ante bellum	Henry V
Henry V's expedition to Poland (1109)	Holy Roman Empire; Duchy of Bohemia	Kingdom of Poland	Defeat	Henry V
War of Bohemian Succession (1125–1126)	Holy Roman Empire	Duchy of Bohemia	Defeat	Lothair III
Wars of the Guelphs and Ghibellines: (1125–1186); (1216–1392)	Ghibellines': Holy Roman Empire; 1st phase: Holy Roman Empire; 2nd phase: Staufen (Empire); Pro-Staufen Sicily; March of Treviso; County of Urbino; Pro-Ghibelline Florence; Pro-Ghibelline Milan led by Della Torre; Pro-Ghibelline Milan led by Visconti; Republic of Siena; Republic of Lucca; Republic of Pisa; Duchy of Modena; Republic of Massa; Pro-Ghibelline Montferrat; Pavia; Commune of Terni; Asti; Todi; Santa Fiora; Variable Italian city-states; Crown of Aragon; Empire of Nicaea	Guelphs': Holy See (Papacy); 1st phase: (Milan) Lombard League; 2nd phase: Welfen (Empire); Pro-Angevin Sicily; Papal States; Pro-Guelph Florence; Pro-Guelph Milan led by Della Torre; Pro-Guelph Milan led by Visconti; House of Della Torre; Commune of Bologna; Republic of Siena; Republic of Lucca; Republic of Genoa; March of Ferrara; Republic of Massa; Pro-Guelph Montferrat; County of Savoy; Republic of Ancona; Patriarchate of Aquileia; Lodi; Perugia; Mantua; Orvieto; Variable Italian city-states	1st phase:Peace of Constance (1186) 2nd phase:Stalemate (1392): Decline of free communes;rise of signorie; Diffusion of Black Death; Extinction of Hohenstaufen dynasty; Conquest of the Kingdom of Sicily by Charles of Anjou; Interregnum after Frederick II's death; Weakening of Imperial Authority over Italy	Frederick I Barbarossa Frederick II Henry VII Louis IV
Wendish Crusade (1147)	Crusaders: Holy Roman Empire; Bishopric of Havelberg; March of Meissen; March of Brandenburg; Duchy of Saxony; Archbishopric of Bremen; Archbishopric of Mainz; Bishopric of Halberstadt; County of Holstein; Bishopric of Münster; Bishopric of Olmütz; Bishopric of Brandenburg; Bishopric of Merseburg; Jutland-Kingdom of Denmark; Zealand/Scania-Kingdom of Denmark; Kingdom of Poland	Wends: Obotrite Confederacy; Obotrites; Wagrians; Liutizian Confederacy Wendish allies: Duchy of Pomerania	Victory: March of Brandenburg reconquers Havelberg, County of Holstein expels its Wends	Conrad III of Germany
Second Crusade (1147–1150)	Holy Roman Empire Other Crusaders	Emirate of Damascus other Muslim and Pagan entities in East Central Europe, Iberia and the Near East.	Indecisive: Victories in East Central Europe and Iberia. Defeat in the Holy Land.	Conrad III of Germany
Frederick I's expedition to Głogów (1157)	Holy Roman Empire; Duchy of Bohemia	Kingdom of Poland; Cumania; Old Prussians	Victory	Frederick I Barbarossa
Third Crusade (1189–1192)	Holy Roman Empire Other Crusaders	Ayyubids	Victory	Frederick I Barbarossa
Henry VI's conquest of Sicily (1194)	Holy Roman Empire	Kingdom of Sicily	Victory: Kingdom of Sicily added to Henry VI's Personal Union	Henry VI
Crusade of 1197	Holy Roman Empire	Ayyubid Sultanate	Victory: Beirut restored to the Kingdom of Jerusalem	Henry VI
Fourth Crusade (1202–1204)	Crusaders from: Kingdom of France: County of Blois; County of Brienne; County of Champagne; County of Flanders; County of Saint-Pol; Holy Roman Empire: March of Montferrat; County of Hainaut	In Europe: Byzantine Empire; Kingdom of Hungary; Kingdom of Croatia; Holy Land: Ayyubid Sultanate	Victory	Otto IV
Prussian Crusade (1217–1274)	Holy Roman Empire Other Crusaders	Baltic pagans:': Prussians; Bartians; Galindians; Natangians; Nadruvians; Pomesanians; Pogesanians; Sambians; Warmians; Yotvingians (Sudovians); Skalvians; Allies of Prussians: Grand Duchy of Lithuania; Duchy of Pomerania	Victory: Teutonic Knights gain control of Prussia	Frederick II
Anglo-French War (1213–1214)	Angevin Empire: Kingdom of England; County of Anjou; Duchy of Normandy; Duchy of Aquitaine; Holy Roman Empire County of Flanders County of Boulogne	Kingdom of France	Defeat: Collapse of the Angevin Empire	Otto IV
Fifth Crusade (1217–1221)	Crusaders: Holy Roman Empire; Kingdom of Portugal; Kingdom of Hungary; Kingdom of France; Levant: Kingdom of Jerusalem; Kingdom of Cyprus; Latin Empire; Military orders: Knights Templar; Teutonic Order; (Sovereign Military Order of Malta) Knights Hospitaller	Muslim forces: Ayyubids	Defeat	Frederick II
Sixth Crusade (1227–1229)	Holy Roman Empire including in Personal Union: Kingdom of Sicily; Kingdom of Jerusalem	Ayyubids	Victory: Crusaders regain Jerusalem	Frederick II
War of the Keys (1228–1230)	Holy Roman Empire: Kingdom of Sicily	Papal States: Lombard League	Victory	Frederick II
War of the Lombards (1228–1243)	Holy Roman Empire; Pro-Imperial faction in the Kingdom of Jerusalem: Tyre; Jerusalem Principality of Antioch and County of Tripoli Republic of Pisa Knights Hospitaller Teutonic Knights	Kingdom of Cyprus; Anti-Imperial faction in the Kingdom of Jerusalem: Acre; Beirut; Arsuf; Caesarea Republic of Genoa Knights Templar Papacy	Defeat	Frederick II
Mongol incursions in the Holy Roman Empire (1241–1242)	Holy Roman Empire	Golden Horde	Victory	Frederick II
Great Interregnum (1245/50–1273/5)	Hohenstaufen party: Frederick II (1245–50); Conrad IV (1245–54); Alfonso X of Castile (1257–75); Rudolf of Habsburg (1273–5)	Welf party: Henry of Thuringia (1246–7); William II of Holland (1247–56); Richard of Cornwall (1257–72); Ottokar II of Bohemia	Compromise: Unanimous election of Rudolf of Habsburg in 1273; Alfonso X of Castile renounced claim in 1275	?
War for the German Crown (1322)	Kingdom of Germany: Duchy of Bavaria	Duchy of Austria	Victory: Capture of Frederick of Habsburg	Louis IV
Polish–Teutonic War (1326–1332)	Teutonic State Holy Roman Empire	Kingdom of Poland; Grand Duchy of Lithuania	Victory	Louis IV
Hussite Wars (1419–1434)	Catholic Church, Crusades and Loyalists: Holy Roman Empire	Bohemian Wars: Hussite Movement	Indecisive: Eventual defeat for Radical Hussites, Victory for Moderate Hussites and Catholics	Sigismund
Austrian–Hungarian War (1477–1488)	Holy Roman Empire	Kingdom of Hungary	Defeat: The Black Army captures Vienna	Frederick III
Austrian–Hungarian War (1490–1491)	Holy Roman Empire	Kingdom of Hungary	Victory: Treaty of Pressburg (1491)	Frederick III
Italian War of 1494–1498	1494: Kingdom of Naples 1495: League of Venice; Papal States; Republic of Venice; Kingdom of Naples; Kingdoms of Spain; Duchy of Milan; Holy Roman Empire; Republic of Florence; England (1496–98); Margraviate of Mantua; Republic of Genoa	Kingdom of France: (Old Swiss Confederacy) Swiss mercenaries; Duchy of Milan (before 1495); Duchy of Ferrara (officially neutral)	Victory	Maximilian I
Swabian War (1499)	Holy Roman Empire Swabian League	Old Swiss Confederacy Three Leagues of the Grisons	Defeat: Peace of Basel; Swiss Confederacy exempt from the resolutions of the Imperial Diet of Worms	Maximilian I
Italian War of 1521–1526	Holy Roman Empire; Spain; England; Papal States (1521–1523 and 1525–1526)	France: (Old Swiss Confederacy) Swiss mercenaries; Republic of Venice; Papal States (1524–1525); Marquisate of Saluzzo	Victory: Capture of Francis I of France at the Battle of Pavia	Charles V
Knights' War (1522–1523)	Holy Roman Empire: Trier; Palatinate	Brotherly Conventention of Knight's	Victory	Charles V
German Peasants' War (1524–1525)	Holy Roman Empire; Swabian League	Peasant army	Victory: Rebellion suppressed	Charles V
War of the League of Cognac (1526–1530)	Pro-Habsburg: Holy Roman Empire; Spain; Duchy of Ferrara; Republic of Genoa (1528–1530); Duchy of Mantua (1528–1530); Papal States (1530)	League of Cognac: Kingdom of France; (Old Swiss Confederacy) Swiss mercenaries; Papal States (1526–1529); (Papal States) Swiss Guards; Republic of Venice; Republic of Florence; Kingdom of England; Republic of Genoa (1526–1528); Kingdom of Navarre; Duchy of Milan	Victory: Treaty of Cambrai (1529); End of the Florentine Republic (1530); Transformation of Florence into an hereditary monarchy by Pope Clement VII (1532)	Charles V
Little War in Hungary	Holy Roman Empire: Archduchy of Austria; Kingdom of Bohemia; Duchy of Styria; Duchy of Carniola; Royal Hungary; Kingdom of Croatia; Spain; Papal States	Ottoman Empire; John Szapolyai's Hungarian kingdom Kingdom of France	Defeat	Charles V
Conquest of Tunis (1535)	(Spain) Spanish Empire: Kingdom of Naples; Kingdom of Sicily; Holy Roman Empire: Republic of Genoa; County of Flanders Kingdom of Portugal Papal States Knights of Malta	Ottoman Empire	Victory: Sack of Tunis; Muley Hassan of the Hafsid dynasty restored as client ruler of Tunis and Spanish-Imperial tributary.	Charles V
Italian War of 1542–1546	Holy Roman Empire; Saxony; Brandenburg; Spain (Kingdom of England) England	France; Ottoman Empire: Regency of Algiers; Jülich-Cleves-Berg; Denmark-Norway (1542–1543)	Inconclusive	Charles V
Schmalkaldic War (1546–1547)	Holy Roman Empire: Habsburg Austria; Electorate of Saxony; (Bohemia) Bohemian Crown; Habsburg Spain; Habsburg Hungary Supported by: Papal States	Schmalkaldic League: Electorate of Saxony; Hesse; Electoral Palatinate; Bremen; Lübeck; Brunswick-Lüneburg; Württemberg; Pomerania-Wolgast; Anhalt-Köthen; Brandenburg-Küstrin; Lesser German states; Supported by: England	Victory: Capitulation of Wittenberg; Schmalkadic League dissolved; Saxon electoral dignity passed to the Albertine House of Wettin	Charles V
Italian War of 1551–1559	Holy Roman Empire; (Spain) Spanish Empire; Papal States (1551–1552); Duchy of Mantua; Kingdom of England (1557–1559); Republic of Florence; Duchy of Savoy; Republic of Genoa; (Sovereign Military Order of Malta) Knights Hospitaller	Kingdom of France; (Old Swiss Confederacy) Swiss mercenaries; Ottoman Empire; Duchy of Parma (1551–1552); Republic of Siena (1552–1555/9); Papal States (1556–1557)	Victory: Treaty of Cateau-Cambrésis	Charles V
Second Schmalkaldic War (March–August 1552)	Imperial–Habsburg forces Holy Roman Empire: (Habsburg monarchy) Habsburg Austria	Protestant princes: Electoral Saxony; Hesse; Prussia; Brandenburg-Kulmbach; Supported by: France	Protestant victory: Peace of Passau (1552); Peace of Augsburg (1555); Three Bishoprics annexed by the Kingdom of France	Charles V
Long Turkish War (1593–1606)	Holy Roman Empire; Transylvania; Kingdom of Hungary; Papal States; Spain	Ottoman Empire	Inconclusive: Peace of Zsitvatorok	Rudolph II
War of the Jülich Succession (1609–1614)	1609–1610: Holy Roman Empire; Principality of Strasbourg; Prince-Bishopric of Liège; Catholic League	1609–1610: Margraviate of Brandenburg; Palatinate-Neuburg; United Provinces; Kingdom of France; Protestant Union	Treaty of Xanten	Rudolph II Matthias
War of the Montferrat Succession (1613–1617)	Supporting the Duke of Mantua: Duchy of Mantua; Montferrat; Tuscany (1613) (Spain) Spanish Empire; France (1613–14); Holy Roman Empire; Kingdom of Naples; Genoa	Supporting the Duke of Savoy: Duchy of Savoy; Montferrat; Tuscany (1613); France (1615–17); Venice	Victory: Peace of Asti; Savoy renounces its claims to Montferrat	Matthias
Uskok War (1615–1617)	Holy Roman Empire; Kingdom of Croatia; Spain	Republic of Venice; Dutch Republic; England	Treaty of Madrid (1617): Many Uskok pirates executed or exiled; Austrian garrison installed to check Uskoks.	Matthias
Thirty Years' War (1618–1648)	Imperial alliance prior to 1635 (Note: States that allied at some point between 1618 and 1635): Habsburg Monarchy; (Spain) Spanish Empire; Bavaria; Catholic League; Post–1635 Peace of Prague: Holy Roman Empire; (Spain) Spanish Empire; Denmark–Norway	Anti-Imperial alliance prior to 1635 (Note: States that fought against the Emperor at some point between 1618 and 1635): Kingdom of Bohemia; Sweden; Palatinate; (Duchy of Savoy) Savoy; Transylvania; Dutch Republic; Denmark–Norway; Heilbronn League; Hesse-Kassel; Brandenburg-Prussia; Saxony; Post–1635 Peace of Prague: France; Sweden; Dutch Republic; Hesse-Kassel	Defeat: Peace of Prague (1635); Peace of Westphalia (1648): Peace of Münster (January 1648) between Spain and the Dutch Republic; Treaty of Osnabrück (IPO; October 1648) between Sweden and the Holy Roman Empire; Treaty of Münster (October 1648) (IPM; October 1648) between France and the Holy Roman Empire; Consequences: France annexes Décapole, and Sundgau; Sweden gains Wismar, Wolin, Western Pomerania, and Bremen-Verden; Brandenburg-Prussia obtains Eastern Pomerania; Spain recognises sovereignty of the Dutch Republic; Old Swiss Confederacy gains independence from the Holy Roman Empire	Ferdinand III
Upper Austrian peasant war of 1626	Holy Roman Empire; Bavaria	Austrian Rebels	Victory	Adam Von Herberstorff
Austro-Turkish War (1663–1664)	League of the Rhine: Kingdom of France; Holy Roman Empire: Electorate of Saxony; Brandenburg-Prussia; Electorate of Bavaria; Baden-Baden; Swabia; Piedmont-Savoy; Kingdom of Hungary; Kingdom of Croatia; Polish–Lithuanian Commonwealth	Ottoman Empire	Peace of Vasvár	Leopold I
Franco-Dutch War (1672–1678)	Dutch Republic; Holy Roman Empire (from 1673); Spain (from 1673); Brandenburg-Prussia (from 1673); Lorraine (from 1673); Denmark–Norway (from 1674); England (1678)	France; England (1672–74); Münster (1672–1674); Cologne (1672–1674); (Sweden) Swedish Empire (from 1674)	Treaty of Nijmegen: Major French territorial gains; France occupies Lorraine, Freiburg and Kehl	Leopold I
War of the Reunions (1683–1684)	(Spain) Spain; Co-belligerent: (Habsburg monarchy) Holy Roman Empire (Republic of Genoa) Genoa	(Kingdom of France) France	Defeat: Truce of Ratisbon	Leopold I
Great Turkish War (1683–1699)	Holy Roman Empire Polish–Lithuanian Commonwealth Tsardom of Russia Republic of Venice Spanish Empire	Ottoman Empire	Victory: Treaty of Karlowitz; The Habsburg monarchy wins lands in Hungary, the Principality of Transylvania and the Balkans.; Poland-Lithuania captures Podolia.; Russia captures the port of Azov.; Venice captures Morea and inner Dalmatia.	Leopold I
Nine Years War (1688–1697)	Grand Alliance: Dutch Republic; England; Scotland; Holy Roman Empire (Spain) Spanish Empire (Duchy of Savoy) Savoyard state	(Kingdom of France) France	Victory: Treaty of Ryswick	Leopold I
War of the Spanish Succession (1701–1714)	Pro-Habsburg Spain; Holy Roman Empire; England (until 1707); Scotland (until 1707); (Kingdom of Great Britain) Great Britain (from 1707); Ireland; Dutch Republic; Prussia (from 1702); Portugal (from 1702); Savoy (from 1703)	Pro-Bourbon Spain; France; Bavaria; Savoy (until 1703); Portugal (until 1702); Cologne (until 1702); Liège (until 1702); Kuruc (1703–1711)	Indecisive: Treaties of Utrecht (1713), Rastatt (1714) and Baden (1714); Philip is recognized as King of Spain, but once more renounces any claim to the throne of France; Austria gains the crowns of Naples and Sardinia as well as the duchy of Milan and the Spanish Netherlands; Savoy gains the crown of Sicily which is soon to be exchanged with Sardinia	Leopold I Joseph I Charles VI
Rákóczi's War of Independence (1703–1711)	Holy Roman Empire: Austria; Prussia; Margraviate of Baden; Serbs from the Military Frontier; Transylvanian Saxons; Kingdom of Croatia; Royalists; (Denmark) Danish Auxiliary Corps; Foreign mercenaries: Swiss; Germans; Italians; Spaniards	Kuruc (Kingdom of Hungary); Principality of Transylvania; Kingdom of France; Minorities: Hungarian Slovenes; Slovaks; Rusyns; Zipser Saxons; Hungarian Germans; Croats from Hungary; Šokac and Bunjevac people; Romanians in Hungary; pro-Hungarian Serbs; Foreign mercenaries and volunteers: Poles; Wallachians; Crimean Tatars; Swedes; Ottoman Turks; Germans; Lithuanians; Moldavians; Bulgarians; Lipka Tatars; Ruthenians	Victory	Leopold I Joseph I Charles VI
War of the Polish Succession (1733–1735)	Poland loyal to Augustus III; Russia; Habsburg Monarchy; Holy Roman Empire (from 1734); Saxony; Prussia	Poland loyal to Stanislaus I; France; Spain; (Duchy of Savoy) Savoy-Sardinia; Duchy of Parma	Treaty of Vienna: Augustus III ascends the throne; Bourbon and Habsburg territorial gains	Charles VI
Liège Revolution (1789–1791)	Prince-Bishops of Liège Holy Roman Empire: (Austrian Empire) Habsburg monarchy; Supported by: Prussia (1789–1790)	Liège rebels Republic of Liège (1789–1791); France (from 1792) Supported by: Prussia (from July 1790)	Defeat: Foundation of Liège Republic (1789); reversion to Prince-Bishopric(1791); annexation by France (1795)	Leopold II
War of the First Coalition (mostly the Low Countries theatre) (1792–1797)	First Coalition: Dutch Republic; Holy Roman Empire: Habsburg monarchy (Austria); Kingdom of Prussia; Electorate of Hanover; Hesse-Kassel (until 1795); Great Britain; Spanish Empire (1793–95): Kingdom of Naples (until 1796); Kingdom of Portugal; Kingdom of Prussia (until 1795); Kingdom of Sardinia (until 1796); Army of Condé	Kingdom of the French (1792); French First Republic (from 1792): Republic of Bouillon (1794–95); Batavian Republic (from 1795); Ligurian Republic (from 1795); Cisrhenian Republic (1797); Cisalpine Republic (1797); other sister republics; Spanish Empire (1796–97): Polish Legions (from 1797)	Defeat: French monarchy abolished, republicanism spread across Europe; All southern Low Countries and Left Bank of the Rhine annexed by France (1795); Treaty of The Hague (1795); Batavian Republic established as a French sister republic; Peace of Basel (1795); Prussia and Hesse-Kassel withdraw from Coalition; Spain allies with France (ending the War of the Pyrenees); Treaty of Campo Formio (1797); Habsburg monarchy accepts the loss of the Austrian Netherlands	Francis II

== Confederation of the Rhine (1806–1813) ==
Conflict	Belligerents		Outcome	Protector
Conflict	Confederation of the Rhine & allies	Opposition	Outcome	Protector
War of the Fourth Coalition (1806–1807)	(First French Empire) France: Confederation of the Rhine; (Kingdom of Etruria) Etruria; Holland; (Kingdom of Italy (Napoleonic)) Italy; (Kingdom of Naples) Naples; Saxony (from 11 Dec 1806); Polish Legions; (Old Swiss Confederacy) Swiss Confederation; Spain Polish rebels	Fourth Coalition:': (Kingdom of Prussia) Prussia; Russia; United Kingdom; Saxony (until 11 Dec 1806); Sweden; Sicily	Victory: Treaties of Tilsit; Treaty of Posen; Franco Russian alliance; Creation of the Continental System; Hostilities resume later in 1807 with the commencement of the Peninsular War and expand and expand in 1809 with the formation of a Fifth Coalition against France	Napoleon I
Peninsular War (1808–1814)	(First French Empire) France: Napoleonic Spain; (Kingdom of Italy (Napoleonic)) Kingdom of Italy; Confederation of the Rhine; Duchy of Warsaw; (Netherlands) Kingdom of Holland (Note: The Dutch Brigade); Denmark-Norway (Evacuation of La Romana's division)	Spain; Portugal; United Kingdom	Defeat: Treaty of Paris; Collapse of the First French Empire; Revolts break out in America	Napoleon I
War of the Fifth Coalition (1809)	(First French Empire) France: Confederation of the Rhine; Bavaria; (Kingdom of Saxony) Saxony; (Kingdom of Westphalia) Westphalia; (Kingdom of Württemberg) Württemberg; Duchy of Warsaw; Italy; (Kingdom of Naples) Naples; (Netherlands) Holland; Russia	Fifth Coalition: Austria; United Kingdom (Note: Mikaberidze 2020, p. 309 states that the contributions of coalition members aside from Austria were "rather nominal". Englund 2004, p. 345 writes that "the only real coalition to be mounted in this nominal fifth war of that name was the coalition France created against unhappy Austria; it included the key German States and Italy."); Portugal; Spain; Sardinia; (Kingdom of Sicily) Sicily; Rebel groups: Black Brunswickers (Note: in rebellion against the Confederation of the Rhine); (Tyrol (federal state)) Tyrol (Note: in rebellion against Bavaria); (Austrian Empire) Gottscheers (Note: in rebellion against France in Illyria); Italian rebels (Note: in rebellion against the Kingdom of Italy)	Victory: Treaty of Schönbrunn; Illyrian Provinces to France; Salzburg to Bavaria; Parts of Bohemia to Saxony; West Galicia to Duchy of Warsaw; East Galicia to Russia	Napoleon I
French Invasion of Russia (1812)	France: Poland; Duchy of Warsaw; Lithuania; Italy; Naples; Rhine Confederation; (Kingdom of Saxony) Saxony; (Kingdom of Bavaria) Bavaria; (Kingdom of Westphalia) Westphalia; (Kingdom of Württemberg) Württemberg; (Grand Duchy of Hesse) Hesse; Berg; (Grand Duchy of Baden) Baden; Switzerland; Spain; French allies: Austria; Prussia; Denmark-Norway	Russia	Defeat	Napoleon I
War of the Sixth Coalition (1813–1814)	Original coalition: Russia; Prussia; Spain; United Kingdom; Hanover; (Grand Duchy of Mecklenburg-Schwerin) Mecklenburg-Schwerin; Portugal; Sardinia; Sicily; Sweden; After the Armistice of Pläswitz: Austria; Bavaria; After the Battle of Leipzig: (Grand Duchy of Baden) Baden; Liechtenstein; Saxony; Württemberg; After 20 November 1813 (Sovereign Principality of the United Netherlands) Netherlands After January 1814 Denmark	France: Duchy of Warsaw (Note: Duchy of Warsaw as a state was in effect fully occupied by Russian and Prussian forces by May 1813, although most Poles remained loyal to Napoleon.); Italy; Naples; Until January 1814: Confederation of the Rhine (many member states defected after Battle of Leipzig); Denmark–Norway; Co-belligerent: United States (War of 1812 only)	Victory: Treaty of Kiel; Treaty of Fontainebleau; Treaty of Paris; Confederation of the Rhine dissolved German states and Austria unite to form the German Confederation Netherlands gains independence Norway ceded to The King of Sweden	Napoleon I

== German Confederation (1815–1866) ==
Conflict	Belligerents		Outcome	Head of the Presiding Power
Conflict	German Confederation & allies	Opposition	Outcome	Head of the Presiding Power
War of the Seventh Coalition (1815)	United Kingdom; (Kingdom of Prussia) Prussia; Russia; (United Kingdom of the Netherlands) Netherlands; Austria; Bourbon Restoration; (Duchy of Brunswick) Brunswick; Denmark (no combat); Hanover; Liechtenstein; Nassau; Sardinia; Sicily; Switzerland; Tuscany; Württemberg	France; (Kingdom of Naples) Naples	Victory: Second Treaty of Paris; End of the Napoleonic Wars; Second exile of Napoleon (to the island of Saint Helena) and second Bourbon Restoration; Beginning of the Concert of Europe	Francis I
German revolutions of 1848–1849	German Confederation: Kingdom of Saxony; Kingdom of Prussia; Austrian Empire	German Empire (1848–1849) German Revolutionaries	Victory: Establishment of German state and introduction of liberal constitution; Dissolution of German Confederation	Ferdinand I Archduke John of Austria Frederick William IV
First Schleswig War (Part of the revolutions of 1848)	German Confederation: Schleswig; Holstein; Prussia; Kingdom of Saxony; Kingdom of Hanover; Mecklenburg-Schwerin	Denmark Supported by: Russian Empire; United Kingdom; Sweden-Norway; France	Defeat: Denmark retains control of Schleswig-Holstein	Ferdinand I of Austria Franz Joseph I of Austria
Second Schleswig War (1864)	Kingdom of Prussia; Austrian Empire	Kingdom of Denmark	Victory: Denmark losses Schleswig, Holstein and Lauenburg to Prussia and Austria	Otto von Bismarck
Austro-Prussian War (1866)	Austrian-led German Confederation states: Austria; Bavaria; Saxony; Hanover; Württemberg; Hesse-Kassel; Baden; Hesse-Darmstadt; Nassau; Saxe-Meiningen; Reuss-Greiz; Schaumburg-Lippe; Frankfurt; Liechtenstein	Prussian-led German states: (Kingdom of Prussia) Prussia; Saxe-Lauenburg; Mecklenburg-Schwerin; (Duchy of Brunswick) Brunswick; Saxe-Coburg & Gotha; Saxe-Altenburg; Mecklenburg-Strelitz; Oldenburg; Anhalt; Schwarzburg; Waldeck; Lippe; Lübeck; Bremen; Hamburg; (Kingdom of Italy) Italy	Victory: Dissolution of the German Confederation; Formation of the North German Confederation, later the German Empire; Formation of Austria-Hungary	Francis Joseph I

== North German Confederation (1867–1870/71) ==
Conflict	Belligerents		Outcome	Chancellor
Conflict	North German Confederation	Opposition	Outcome	Chancellor
Franco-Prussian War (1870–1871)	Before 18 January 1871: North German Confederation: Prussia; Saxony; Hesse; and 19 smaller states; Bavaria; Württemberg; Baden After 18 January 1871: German Empire	Before 4 September 1870: French Empire After 4 September 1870: French Republic (Note: Under the Government of National Defense.): Foreign volunteers	German victory: End of the Second French Empire; Unification of Germany and establishment of the German Empire; German annexation of Alsace-Lorraine	Otto von Bismarck

== Post-unification (1871–present) ==
=== German Empire (1871–1918) ===
Conflict	Belligerents		Outcome	Imperial Chancellor	German losses
Conflict	Germany & allies	Opposition	Outcome	Imperial Chancellor	German losses
Batsch affair (1872)	Germany	Haiti	Victory: Haiti paid the 3,000 pounds demanded by Germany	Otto von Bismarck	?
Eisenstück affair (1877–1878)	Germany	Nicaragua	Victory: Nicaragua pays Germany a US$30,000 indemnity; Nicaraguan soldiers salute the Reichskriegsflagge	Otto von Bismarck	None
Nauruan Civil War (1878–1888)	Supporters of King Aweida; Germany	Anti-Aweida Rebels	Victory: Nauru is annexed as part of German New Guinea	Otto von Bismarck	?
First Samoan Civil War (1886–1894)	Supporters of Laupepa; Germany	Supporters of Mata'afa	Compromise: Malietoa Laupepa restored to power	Otto von Bismarck	16 dead
Abushiri Revolt (1888–1889)	Germany; United Kingdom	Arab Rebels led by al-Harthi	Victory: Rebellion put down	Otto von Bismarck	?
Blockade of Zanzibar (1888–1889)	German Empire; British Empire; Portuguese Empire; Kingdom of Italy	Sultanate of Zanzibar	Victory	Otto von Bismarck	?
Battle of Kibosho (1891)	German Empire	Kibosho Kingdom	Victory	Leo von Caprivi	3
Hehe Rebellion (1891–1898)	Germany	Hehe	Victory: Rebellion put down	Leo von Caprivi	?
Bafut Wars (1891–1907)	Germany	Fondom of Bafut	Victory: Exile of the Fon of Bafut	Leo von Caprivi	?
Battle of Adibo (1896)	Germany	Dagbaŋ	Victory	Chlodwig von Hohenlohe-Schillingsfürst	?
Lüders affair (1897)	Germany	Haiti	Victory	Chlodwig von Hohenlohe-Schillingsfürst	?
Second Samoan Civil War (1898–1899)	Supporters of Mata'afa; Germany	Supporters of Tanumafili I United States; United Kingdom	Compromise: Tripartite Convention	Chlodwig von Hohenlohe-Schillingsfürst	?
Boxer Rebellion (1899–1901)	Eight-Nation Alliance British Empire Russia Japan France Germany United States Italy Austria-Hungary: Netherlands; Spain; Belgium; (Qing dynasty) Mutual Defence Pact of Southeast China (after 1900)	Boxer movement; Qing dynasty (after 1900)	Eight-Nation Alliance victory: Signing of the Boxer Protocol; Provisions for foreign troops to be stationed in Beijing	Chlodwig von Hohenlohe-Schillingsfürst	?
Adamawa Wars (1899–1907)	Germany; United Kingdom	Sokoto Caliphate; Mahdist rebels	Victory: German rule in Kamerun solidified	Chlodwig von Hohenlohe-Schillingsfürst	?
Venezuelan Crisis (1902–1903)	United Kingdom; Germany; Italy	Venezuela	Compromise: Venezuelan debt dispute resolved	Bernhard von Bülow	?
Kavango Uprising (1903)	German Empire	Kavango rebels	Victory: Uprising suppressed	Bernhard von Bülow	?
Herero Wars (1904–1908)	Germany	Herero; Namaqua	Victory: Herero and Namaqua genocide	Bernhard von Bülow	1,541 dead
Maji Maji Rebellion (1905–1908)	Germany	Qadiriyya Brotherhood; Matumbi; Ngoni; Yao	Victory: Rebellion put down	Bernhard von Bülow	397 dead
Sokehs Rebellion (1910–1911)	Germany	Sokehs tribe	Victory: Rebellion put down	Bernhard von Bülow	?
Agadir Crisis (1911)	Germany	France; United Kingdom; Spain	Compromise: Morocco–Congo Treaty	Bernhard von Bülow	None
Ndungutse's rebellion (1912)	Germany	Ndungutse's coalition	Victory: Rebellion put down	Bernhard von Bülow	?
World War I (1914–1918)	Germany; Austria-Hungary; Ottoman Empire; Bulgaria	France; United Kingdom; Russia (withdrew); United States; Italy; Canada; Australia; New Zealand; India; South Africa; Serbia; Montenegro; Belgium; Romania; Greece; Portugal; Brazil; Nepal; Japan; China; Siam; Hejaz	Defeat: Victory of Germany and its allies on the Eastern Front, leading to an armistice between Russia and the Central Powers and the Treaty of Brest-Litovsk; Armistice of 11 November 1918, Paris Peace Conference; Communist Russian Revolution and Russian Civil War, formation of the Soviet Union in 1922; Establishment of the Weimar Republic; Rise of the United States; Transfer of German colonies and territories to other countries, partition of the Ottoman Empire, dissolution of Austria-Hungary; Turkish War of Independence; Creation of the League of Nations	Theobald von Bethmann Hollweg	2,198,420 to 2,800,720 dead
Finnish Civil War (1918)	Finnish Whites; German Empire; Foreign volunteers: Swedish Brigade; Estonian volunteers; (Second Polish Republic) Polish Legion in Finland; (Russian Empire) White Army	Finnish Reds; (Russian Socialist Federative Soviet Republic) Soviet Russia	Victory: Establishment of the Kingdom of Finland; German hegemony until November 1918; Division in Finnish society; Collapse of the Finnish Reds	Georg von Hertling	450–500 killed in action
Ukrainian War of Independence (1917–1921)	Ukrainian State South Russia Germany Poland	Russian SFSR; UNRR; URR; Ukrainian SSR	Victory (The Bolsheviks were forced out of Ukraine as long as Germany was stationed there. see Operation Faustschlag	Hermann von Eichhorn	?

=== Weimar Republic (1918–1933) ===
Conflict	Belligerents		Outcome	Chancellor	German losses
Conflict	Germany & allies	Opposition	Outcome	Chancellor	German losses
German Revolution (1918–1919)	(German Empire) Germany	Revolutionaries	Government victory: Establishment of the Weimar Republic	Friedrich Ebert	?
Greater Poland Uprising (1918–1919)	(German Empire) Germany	POW	Defeat: Poland gains Greater Poland	Friedrich Ebert	?
Lithuanian–Soviet War (1918–1919)	Lithuania; Saxon Volunteers	Russian SFSR; Lithuanian-Byelorussian SSR	Victory	Friedrich Ebert (1918–1919); Philipp Scheidemann (1919); Gustav Bauer (1919)	?
First Silesian Uprising (1919)	Weimar Republic	POW-GS	Victory: German forces crush uprising	Gustav Bauer	?
Kapp Putsch (1920)	Weimar Republic: Striking workers	Putschists: Marinebrigade Ehrhardt	Government victory: Collapse of the Putsch; General strike in opposition of the Putsch; Order restored and elections held; Amnesty for Putschists; Ruhr uprising	Friedrich Ebert	?
French occupation of Frankfurt (1920)	Weimar Republic	(French Third Republic) France	Victory: French withdrawal	Friedrich Ebert	9 dead
Ruhr Uprising (1920)	Weimar Republic	Ruhr Red Army	Government victory: Uprising crushed	Friedrich Ebert	1,600+ (Both combatants)
Second Silesian Uprising (1920)	Weimar Republic	POW-GS	League of Nations ceasefire: Order restored by Allied intervention	Constantin Fehrenbach	?
March Action (1921)	Weimar Republic	Communist Party; Communist Workers Party	Government victory	Constantin Fehrenbach	31 police officers dead
Third Silesian Uprising (1921)	Weimar Republic	POW-GS	League of Nations ceasefire: Parts of Upper Silesia ceded to Poland	Joseph Wirth	?
Hamburg Uprising (1923)	Weimar Republic	Communist Party of Germany	Government victory	Friedrich Ebert	17 dead, 61 civilians dead
Beer Hall Putsch (1923)	Weimar Republic: Bavarian State Police; Reichswehr	Kampfbund: Nazi Party; Sturmabteilung; Stoßtrupp-Hitler; Bund Reichskriegsflagge; Freikorps Oberland	Government victory	Friedrich Ebert	4 police officers dead, 1 civilian dead
Prussian coup d'état (1932)	Weimar Republic	Prussia	Government victory: Prussia brought under direct rule; von Papen installed as Reichskommissar; End of democracy in Prussia	Paul von Hindenburg	?

=== Nazi Germany (1933–1945) ===
Conflict	Belligerents		Outcome	Führer	German losses
Conflict	Germany & allies	Opposition	Outcome	Führer	German losses
German involvement in the Spanish Civil War (1936–1939)	(Spain) Spanish Nationalists; Italy; Germany; Portugal	(Second Spanish Republic) Spanish Republicans; International Brigades	Victory: End of the Second Spanish Republic	Adolf Hitler	~300 killed
Sudeten German uprising	Sudeten Germans: SdP sympathisers; Freikorps; Grüne Korps; Supported by: Germany: Schutzstaffel; Sturmabteilung; Abwehr	Czechoslovakia: Czechoslovak Army; State Defence Guard; Republikanische Wehr	Defeat	Adolf Hitler	ca.200
Invasion of Czechoslovakia (1939)	Germany; Hungary; Poland	Czechoslovakia	Victory: German occupation of Czechoslovakia	Adolf Hitler	21 killed and wounded
World War II (1939–1945)	Germany; Japan; Italy; Hungary; Romania; Bulgaria Finland; Thailand	Soviet Union; United States; United Kingdom; China; France; Poland; Canada; Australia; New Zealand; India; South Africa; Yugoslavia; Greece; Denmark; Norway; Netherlands; Belgium; Luxembourg; Ethiopia; Brazil; Mexico; Colombia; Cuba; Nepal; Philippines; Mongolia	Defeat: Collapse of Nazi Germany and its allies. Allied occupation of Germany and Japan as well as Austria and Korea. Germany loses its pre-war and wartime territorial gains, as well as the eastern territories. Remaining German territory is placed under Allied occupation until 1949, when West and East Germany are established.; Economy and facility of Germany suffers heavy loss; Flight and expulsion of Germans from various territories in Central and Eastern Europe, including from Germany's eastern territories; Creation of the United Nations and rise of internationalism	Adolf Hitler	6,900,000 to 7,400,000 dead

=== East Germany (1949–1990) ===
Conflict	Belligerents		Outcome	Leadership of East Germany	German losses
Conflict	Germany & allies	Opposition	Outcome	Leadership of East Germany	German losses
East German uprising of 1953 (1953)	East Germany; Soviet Union	Demonstrators	Victory	Walter Ulbricht	5 police killed
Berlin Crisis (1961)	Soviet Union; East Germany; Supported by: Warsaw Pact (except Albania)	United States; West Germany; Supported by: NATO	Stalemate: Erection of the Berlin Wall on 12–13 August 1961	Walter Ulbricht	None
Peaceful Revolution (1989-1990)	Government of East Germany; Socialist Unity Party; Stasi; Volkspolizei; Volkspolizei-Bereitschaft; Border Troops	East German opposition; Anti-government demonstrators; New Forum; Initiative for Peace and Human Rights; Democratic Awakening; Democracy Now	Defeat: Collapse of East Germany; Reunification of Germany	Erich Honecker	None

=== West Germany (1949–1990) ===
Conflict	Belligerents		Outcome	Leadership of West Germany	German losses
Conflict	Germany & allies	Opposition	Outcome	Leadership of West Germany	German losses
Operation Jungle (1949-1955)	United Kingdom; West Germany; Sweden; Denmark; United States	Soviet Union: Lithuanian Soviet Socialist Republic; (Poland) Polish People's Republic	Defeat	Konrad Adenauer	?
Cod Wars (1958-1976)	United Kingdom; West Germany; Belgium	Iceland	Defeat	Konrad Adenauer and others	?
German Autumn (1977)	West Germany; Supported by: Somali Democratic Republic; United States	Red Army Faction; Revolutionary Cells; Popular Front for the Liberation of Palestine	Victory	Helmut Schmidt	6 dead

=== Federal Republic of Germany (1991–present) ===
Conflict	Belligerents		Outcome	Federal Chancellor	German losses
Conflict	Germany & allies	Opposition	Outcome	Federal Chancellor	German losses
Gulf War (1990–1991)	United States; United Kingdom; France; Saudi Arabia; Egypt; Kuwait; Coalition: Afghan mujahideen; Argentina; Australia; Bahrain; Bangladesh; Belgium; Canada; Czechoslovakia; Denmark; Germany; Greece; Honduras; Hungary; Italy; Japan; Luxembourg; Morocco; Netherlands; New Zealand; Niger; Norway; Oman; Pakistan; Philippines; Poland; Portugal; Qatar; Romania; Senegal; Sierra Leone; Singapore; South Korea; Spain; Sweden; Syria; Turkey; United Arab Emirates	Iraq → Iraq	Victory	Helmut Kohl	?
Operation Deliberate Force (1995)	NATO: Belgium; Canada; Denmark; France; Germany; Italy; Luxembourg; Netherlands; Norway; Portugal; Spain; Turkey; United Kingdom; United States; United Nations Protection Force	Republika Srpska	Victory: Dayton Accords	Helmut Kohl	None
Operation Allied Force (1999)	NATO: Belgium; Canada; Denmark; France; Germany; Italy; Luxembourg; Netherlands; Norway; Portugal; Spain; Turkey; United Kingdom; United States	FR Yugoslavia	Compromise: Kumanovo Treaty; Yugoslav security forces pull out of Kosovo; United Nations Resolution 1244	Gerhard Schröder	None
War in Afghanistan (2001–2021)	Afghanistan; ISAF: United States; United Kingdom; Canada; Australia; New Zealand; Germany; France; Italy; Czech Republic; Netherlands; Turkey; Romania; Georgia; South Korea; Poland; Denmark; Sweden; Norway; Others	(Afghanistan) Taliban al-Qaeda	Taliban victory: Fall of the Islamic Emirate of Afghanistan in 2001; Establishment of new Afghan government; Fall of the Islamic Republic of Afghanistan, reestablishment of the Islamic Emirate of Afghanistan on 16 August 2021; War in North-West Pakistan	Gerhard Schröder (2001–2005); Angela Merkel (2005–2021)	59 dead
War on ISIL (2015–present)	Iraq; Kurdistan Region; Syrian Kurdistan; CJTF–OIR: United States; United Kingdom; Canada; France; Germany; Turkey; Saudi Arabia; Qatar; Jordan; Bahrain; United Arab Emirates; Morocco; Australia; Netherlands; Belgium; Denmark; Norway	ISIL al-Qaeda	Ongoing: Airstrikes on ISIL and al-Qaeda affiliates positions in Iraq and Syria; Islamic terrorism in Europe	Angela Merkel (2015–2021); Olaf Scholz (2021–2025); Friedrich Merz (2025–present)	See below (Note: No German soldiers have been killed by ISIS, however, many German civilians have been killed in terror attacks claimed by ISIS. For details, see Islamic terrorism in Europe)
Mali War (2017–2023)	Mali (United Nations) MINUSMA: France; (Nigeria) ECOWAS; Chad; Germany; Netherlands; Sweden	al-Qaeda	Compromise: The Foreign Minister of Mali requested that the United Nations terminate MINUSMA due to what he called its "failure" to stabilize the situation there on 16 June 2023; MINUSMA was officially terminated on 30 June 2023.; Dissolution of United Nations peacekeeping mission on 31 December 2023; Withdrawal of all contributing MINUSMA nations and retreat of their troops within 6 months	Angela Merkel (2015–2021); Olaf Scholz (2021–2025); Friedrich Merz (2025–present)	2 dead
2022 German coup d'état plot	Germany	Patriotische Union; QAnon followers; COVID-19 deniers	Victory: arrests of alleged conspirators including Heinrich Prinz Reuss and Birgit Malsack-Winkemann	Angela Merkel (2015–2021); Olaf Scholz (2021–2025); Friedrich Merz (2025–present)	None
Operation Aspides	European Union: Belgium; Estonia; Finland; France; Germany; Greece; Italy; Latvia; Netherlands; Sweden	Yemen (SPC)	Ongoing	Angela Merkel (2015–2021); Olaf Scholz (2021–2025); Friedrich Merz (2025–present)	None

== Sources ==
- Chandler, David (1981) [1980]. Waterloo: The Hundred Days. Osprey Publishing.
- Croxton, Derek (2013). The Last Christian Peace: The Congress of Westphalia as A Baroque Event. Palgrave Macmillan. ISBN 978-1-137-33332-2.
- Englund, Steven (2004). Napoleon : a Political Life. New York: Scribner. ISBN 978-0-684-87142-4. OCLC 1085212315.
- Heitz, Gerhard; Rischer, Henning (1995). Geschichte in Daten. Mecklenburg-Vorpommern; History in data; Mecklenburg-Western Pomerania (in German). Koehler&Amelang. ISBN 3-7338-0195-4.
- Hofschroer, Peter (2006). 1815 The Waterloo Campaign: Wellington, his German allies and the Battles of Ligny and Quatre Bras. Vol. 1. Greenhill Books.
- Lackman, Matti (2009), Jääkäriliike. In: Haapala, P. & Hoppu, T. (eds.) Sisällissodan pikkujättiläinen, Helsinki: WSOY, pp. 48–57, ISBN 978-951-0-35452-0
- McMeekin, Sean (2017). The Russian Revolution: A New History. London: Profile Books. ISBN 978-1-78125-902-3.
- Mikaberidze, Alexander (2020). The Napoleonic Wars: A Global History. Oxford: Oxford University Press. ISBN 978-0-19-995106-2.
- Pipes, Richard (1996). A Concise History of the Russian Revolution. New York: Vintage Books. ISBN 0-679-74544-0.
- Tuchman, Barbara W. (1978). A Distant Mirror: the Calamitous 14th Century. New York: Alfred A. Knopf. ISBN 0-345-28394-5.
- Zamoyski, Adam (2004). Moscow 1812: Napoleon's Fatal March. London: HarperCollins. ISBN 978-0-00-712375-9.
