= German–Polish War =

German–Polish War may refer to:

- German–Polish War (1003–1018)
- German–Polish War (1028–1031)
- German–Polish War (1109)
- Invasion of Poland (1939), during World War II

== See also ==
- List of wars involving Germany
- List of wars involving Poland
