= Otto II's raid on Poland =

Otto II's raid on Poland (979)
- Part of German–Polish War
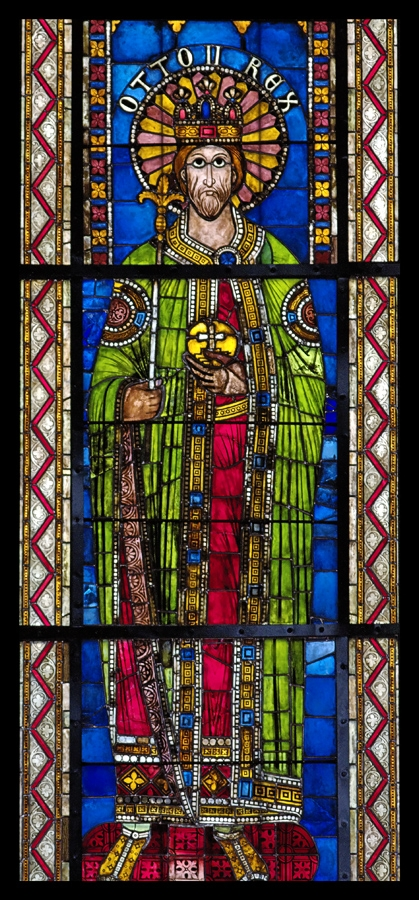
- Otto II, from a series of Holy Roman emperors (12th and 13th centuries); the panels are now set into Gothic windows, Strasbourg Cathedral
Date	979 – Summer 980
Location	Poznań, Greater Poland
Result	Polish victory

Belligerents
Civitas Schinesghe	Holy Roman Empire

Commanders and leaders
Mieszko I	Otto II

Strength
Unknown	Unknown

This is the 979 German-Polish War. For a list of all Polish-German Wars, see Polish-German Wars.

Otto II's raid on Poland was a military expedition against Civitas Schinesghe the state of Mieszko I after Mieszko I supported the rebellious prince Henry the Quarrelsome during the civil war in Germany following the death of Emperor Otto I the Great. The invasion ended in defeat for the Holy Roman Empire, as Otto II could not achieve any military success which forced him to return to Germany.

== Background ==
Mieszko I, the first historical ruler of the Piast state, initially maintained strong relations with Emperor Otto I the Great, being recognized as both an ally and a friend. However, this relationship was abruptly strained in 972 when Margrave Odo, acting independently, invaded Piast territories. In response, Mieszko confronted Odo at the Battle of Cedynia, achieving a significant victory.

Although the battle was relatively minor in scale, it drew the attention of Emperor Otto I, who condemned Mieszko for the conflict and demanded punitive measures. Mieszko was compelled to send his six-year-old son, Bolesław, as a hostage to the imperial court. Bolesław's captivity, however, was brief; Mieszko secured his release following Otto I's death in 973, exploiting the political instability in Germany. Mieszko subsequently involved himself in the German civil war, siding with a rebellious duke against Otto II.

Otto II's suppression of the rebellion led to severe consequences for its supporters, including the imprisonment of Henry of Bavaria and military campaigns against Bohemian allies. During this turbulent period, the death of Mieszko’s Christian wife, Dobrawa, in 977, weakened Piast-Bohemian ties, allowing Mieszko to seek alliances with German nobles. Meanwhile, King Lothair of France unexpectedly allied with the Piasts and invaded Aachen, diverting Otto II’s focus and complicating the geopolitical landscape of the region.

== Raid ==
As Otto II prepared to march east in 979, Mieszko fortified his positions in Greater Poland, notably strengthening the fortress of Poznań. The subsequent conflict between Otto II and Mieszko remains shrouded in mystery, but it set the stage for future confrontations between the German and Polish rulers. Ultimately, faced with logistical challenges and diminishing morale, Otto II retreated from Greater Poland without achieving decisive victory. The conflict forced Otto II to recognize Mieszko's strengthened position and seek a peace agreement, albeit indirectly and without admitting defeat.

== Aftermath ==
The Polish-German agreement was concluded in the spring or possibly summer of 980, because in November of that year Otto II left his country and went to Italy. It appears that during this time Mieszko I married Oda, daughter of Dietrich of Haldensleben, Margrave of the Northern March, after abducting her from the monastery of Kalbe. Chronicler Thietmar described the event as follows:

When Bolesław's mother died his father married, without permission from the Church, a nun from the monastery in Kalbe, daughter of Margrave Dietrich. Oda was her name and her guilt was great. For she scorned her vows to God, and gave preference to the man of war before him (...). But because of the concern for the well-being of the homeland and the necessity to secure its peace, the event caused no break of relations, instead a proper way was found to restore concord. For thanks to Oda the legion of followers of Christ became augmented, many prisoners returned to their country, the shackled had their chains taken off, and the gates of prisons were opened for the trespassers.

— Thietmari chronicon, vol. IV cap. 57

Although Thietmar made no mention of warfare that possibly took place on this occasion, the information on the return of the accord, acting for the good of the country and release of prisoners indicate that a conflict actually did occur.

== Archeology ==
Archaeological discoveries appear to support the thesis of Otto II's invasion. In the last quarter of the 10th century there had been a radical expansion of the fortifications at Gniezno and Ostrów Lednicki, which may be associated with the Polish-German war, or the expectation of such. The duration of the expedition suggests that it may have reached as far east as the vicinity of Poznań.

== Sources ==
- Marek Kazimierz Barański, Dynastia Piastów w Polsce (in Polish), Warsaw 2008. ISBN 9788301182137
- Stanisław Rosik, Mieszko I i jego czasy (in Polish), 2001. ISBN 9-788-37023-8834
- Karol Olejnik, Cedynia, Niemcza, Głogów, Krzyszków, Cracow 1988.
- Klaus Zernack, Polska a Niemcy i Cesarstwo w X wieku, Poznań 1933.
- Gerard Labuda, Mieszko I, Wrocław 2002. ISBN 9-788-30404-6191
- Thietmar of Merseburg, Thietmari chronicon, vol IV ISBN 9-781-33257-8290
- Gerard Labuda, Mieszko I, Wrocław 2002.
