= Siege of Bautzen =

- Part of German–Polish War; Crisis of the Piast dynasty
Date	1029
Location	Bautzen, Kingdom of Poland
Result	Polish victory

Belligerents
Kingdom of Poland	Holy Roman Empire

Commanders and leaders
Mieszko II Lambert	Conrad II

The siege of Bautzen (German: Belagerung von Bautzen; Polish: Oblężenie Budziszyna) was a siege of city of Bautzen, Kingdom of Poland that took place in 1029 during the German–Polish War between 1028 and 1031. Following the raid of Saxony organised by king of Poland, Mieszko II Lambert, Conrad II, the emperor of the Holy Roman Empire, had attacked Poland and organised the siege of the city. Despite heavy casualties, Polish forces managed to defeat the attackers, and Imperial forces had retreated.
