= Battle of Lubusz (1239) =

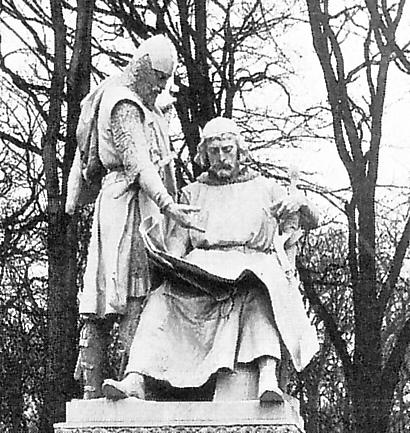
- Otto III and John I
Date	1239
Location	Lebus Land, Kingdom of Poland
Result	Polish victory

Belligerents
Duchy of Silesia	Margraviate of Brandenburg

Commanders and leaders
Henry II the Pious	Otto III; John I

Strength
Unknown	Unknown

The Battle of Lubusz (1239) was a conflict between the Margraviate of Brandenburg and the Polish Duke Henry II the Pious, the conflict ended in victory for Henry. Lebus Land remained under Polish control and Cedynia and Kienitz were retained by Pomeranian Prince Barnim I.

== Background ==
The will of Boleslaw III Wrymouth, which divided the country among his sons, initiated a feudal fragmentation in Poland. The country, fragmented into many principalities, became weak and vulnerable to attacks from its neighbors. Despite this situation, the thought of unifying the country appeared continuously in the minds of some of the more prominent Piast princes. At the beginning of the 13th century, Henry I the Bearded took over the authorities in Silesia. Under his rule, the prince managed to unite most of the Polish lands. Becoming the most powerful of the Piasts, he began to think about a crown for his son Henry II the Pious. Henry I the Bearded died in 1238.

== Battle of Lubusz (1239) ==
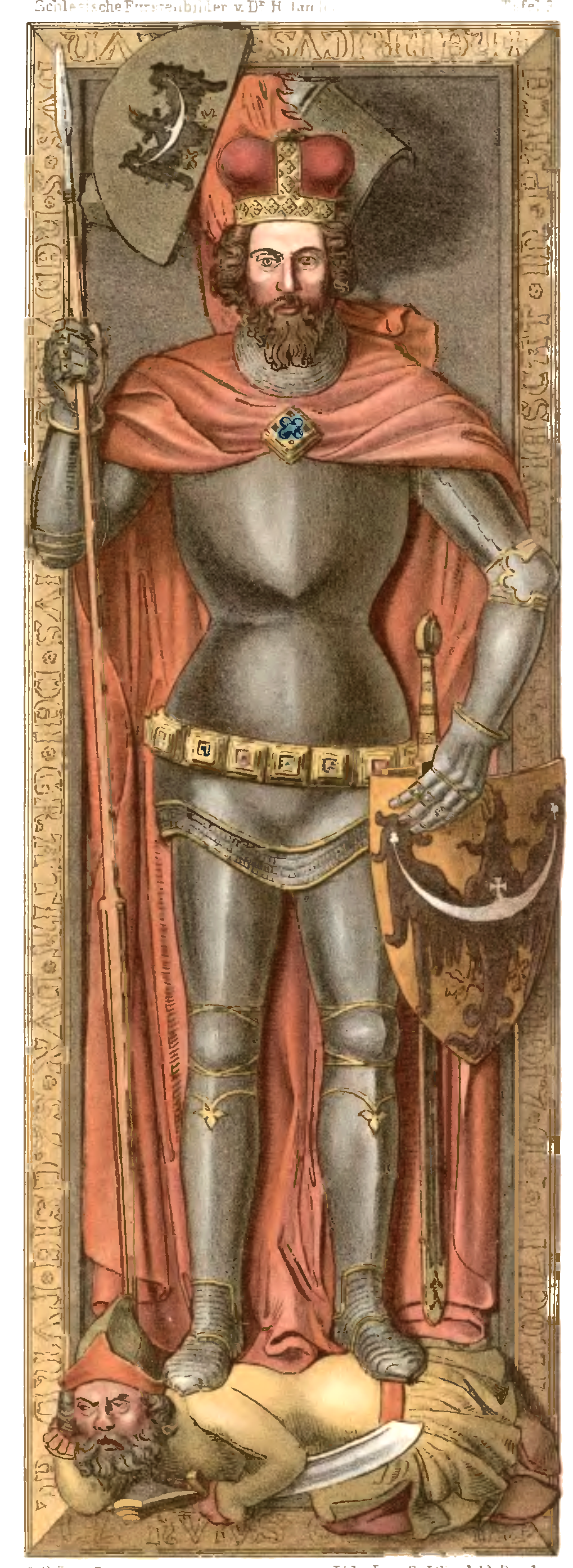
Henry II the Pious

After the death of Duke Henry the Bearded in 1238, the Brandenburgian Margraves Otto III and John I took steps to control the Lebus Land. Interacting with the Pomeranian Duke Barnim I, they crossed the Oder River and took Santok. At the same time, Barnim took Cedynia and Kienitz from Henry II the Pious, shifting the boundaries of his duchy to the line of the Myśla River. The next step for the young German princes was to seize Lebus and control the entire Lubusz land. They established closer contacts with the Margrave of Meissen, Henry III, and Archbishop Wilbrand of Magdeburg. In the summer of 1239 a great expedition headed by Archbishop Wilbrand and one of the Margraves of Brandenburg set off. The German actions did not surprise Henry the Pious. The Silesian prince organized a strong relief in time and beat back the German troops besieging Lebus. Henry the Pious won a magnificent victory inflicting high losses on the aggressors. The defeat divided the Archbishop and the young margraves, giving rise to a new war between the Brandenburgers and the Margrave of Meissen.

== Aftermath ==
Shortly after repelling the invasion, Henry the Pious regained Santok, but left Cedynia and Kienitz in the hands of Pomeranian Duke Barnim.

Henry II the Pious proved to be a worthy successor to his father. He smashed the German army to the ground and saved Lebus. Then he recaptured Santok as well. In the meantime, emphasizing his power, he was able to meddle in German politics by proposing the election of a German anti-king in his estate, precisely in Lebus.

== See also ==
- First War for Lebus
- List of Wars involving Poland
- List of Wars involving Germany
- Henry II the Pious
- Otto III, Margrave of Brandenburg
- John I, Margrave of Brandenburg
