= List of wars involving the Czech lands =

This is a list of wars involving the Czech Republic and its predecessor states.

== Before 850 ==
Year	War	Allies	Enemies	Leaders	Events	Conclusion
626	War against Avars	Samo's empire	Avar Khaganate	Samo	Samo's rebellion	Victory
631	War between Samo's empire and Frank Empire	Samo's empire	Francia	Samo	Battle of Wogastisburg	Victory
632–634	Raids on Thuringia	Samo's empire	Francia	Samo		Victory
79?–795	Francian Campaigns against Avars	Czechs; Francia	Avar Khaganate			Victory
805	Great Turkestan War	Czechs	Francia	Lech	Siege of Canburg	Victory
833	Conquest of Nitrian Principality	Principality of Moravia	Principality of Nitra	Mojmir I		Victory
848–849	Louis the German's campaign against Bohemia	Bohemia	East Francia	14 princes	Battle of Záseky	Victory

== 850–1526 ==
Year	War	Allies	Enemies	Leaders	Events	Conclusion
864–874	Great Moravia war against East Francia	Great Moravia; Bohemia	East Francia	Svatopluk I Bohemian princes	Battle of Vltava	Victory
936–950	Bohemian-Saxon war	Duchy of Bohemia	Holy Roman Empire	Boleslaus I	Battle of Meissen (936); Siege of castle Nova	Defeat
955	Battle of Lechfeld	Kingdom of Germany; Duchy of Bohemia	Principality of Hungary	Otto I Boleslaus I		Victory
967	Polish–Veletian War	Duchy of Poland; Duchy of Bohemia	Veleti; Wolinians		Battle between Mieszko I and Wichmann	Victory
975–978	War against Otto II	Duchy of Bohemia	Holy Roman Empire	Boleslaus II	Battle of Pilsen (976)	Victory
988–990	Polish-Bohemian War	Duchy of Bohemia	Duchy of Poland; Holy Roman Empire	Boleslaus II		Defeat
995	War against Slavník dynasty	Duchy of Bohemia	Zlicans	Boleslaus II		Victory
1002–1005	Polish-German War	Duchy of Bohemia; Holy Roman Empire	Duchy of Poland	Henry II; Jaromír		Victory
1015–1018	Polish-German War	Duchy of Bohemia; Holy Roman Empire	Duchy of Poland	Henry II; Oldřich		Defeat
1029–1031	Polish-German War	Duchy of Bohemia (since 1029) Holy Roman Empire Others	Kingdom of Poland Kingdom of Hungary	Conrad II; Bretislaus I		Victory
1030–1031	Campaign into Hungary	Duchy of Bohemia	Kingdom of Hungary	Bretislaus I		Bretislaus I led the Bohemian army and devastated the land until Esztergom and marched until River Garam. He was forced to retreat however
1035	Campaign against Lutici	Duchy of Bohemia	Lusatia	Bretislaus I		Victory
1040–1041	War against Henry III.	Duchy of Bohemia	Holy Roman Empire	Bretislaus I	Battle at Brůdek; Siege of Prague (1041)	Defeat
1042–1044	German-Hungarian War	Duchy of Bohemia; Holy Roman Empire	Kingdom of Hungary	Henry III; Bretislaus I		Victory
1051	Emperor Henry III.'s military campaigns against Hungary	Duchy of Bohemia; Holy Roman Empire	Kingdom of Hungary	Henry III; Bretislaus I		Defeat
1063	Siege of Hradec nad Moravicí	Duchy of Bohemia	Kingdom of Poland	Vratislaus II		Victory
1073–1075	Saxon revolt	Duchy of Bohemia; Holy Roman Empire	Duchy of Saxony	Henry IV; Vratislaus II	Battle of Langensalza (1075)	Victory
1077–1088	Great Saxon Revolt	Duchy of Bohemia; Holy Roman Empire	Rudolf of Rheinfelden	Henry IV; Vratislaus II	Battle of Flarchheim; Battle on the Elster	Victory
1126	War of succession to the Duchy of Bohemia	Holy Roman Empire	Duchy of Bohemia	Soběslav I		Victory
1132-1135	Soběslaus I raids into Silesia	Duchy of Bohemia	Kingdom of Poland	Soběslaus I		Victory
1145–1149	Second Crusade	Duchy of Bohemia; Crusaders	Saracens	Vladislaus II		Defeat
1158	Milan Campaign	Duchy of Bohemia; Holy Roman Empire	Milan	Frederick Barbarossa; Vladislaus II		Victory
1189–1192	Third Crusade	Duchy of Bohemia; Crusaders	Muslims; Byzantine Empire	Frederick Barbarossa; Frederick VI; Děpolt II	German–Byzantine war Battle of Philomelion (1190); Battle of Iconium (1190); Siege of Acre (1189–1191)	Military victory
1241	Mongol invasion of Moravia	Kingdom of Bohemia	Mongol Empire			Mongols retreated
1254–1255	Prussian Crusade	Kingdom of Bohemia; Teutonic Knights	Grand Duchy of Lithuania	Ottokar II	Battle of Rudau (1254)	Victory
1257	Bohemia–Bavarian War	Kingdom of Bohemia	Bavaria	Ottokar II		Defeat
1260	War of Styria	Kingdom of Bohemia; Duchy of Austria	Kingdom of Hungary	Ottokar II		Victory
1267–1268	Prussian Crusade	Kingdom of Bohemia; Teutonic Knights	Grand Duchy of Lithuania	Ottokar II		Retreat
1270–1271	Hungarian Campaign	Kingdom of Bohemia	Kingdom of Hungary	Ottokar II		Victory
1273	Bohemian–Hungarian War	Kingdom of Bohemia	Kingdom of Hungary	Ottokar II		Victory
1278	War against Rudolf von Habsburg	Kingdom of Bohemia; Margraviate of Moravia; Duchy of Głogów; Duchy of Lower Bavaria; Duchy of Silesia	Duchy of Austria; Kingdom of Hungary; Kingdom of Germany; Burgraviate of Nuremberg	Ottokar II		Defeat
1291-1292	Wenceslaus II.'s Polish Campaign	Kingdom of Bohemia	Duchy of Sandomierz	Wenceslaus II		Victory
1298	Fight for the rule over the Holy Roman Empire	Kingdom of Bohemia; Duchy of Austria	County of Nassau; Electoral Palatinate			Victory
1304	Anti-Bohemian Coalition	Kingdom of Bohemia	Holy Roman Empire; Charles I of Hungary	Wenceslaus II	Siege of Kutná Hora (1304)	Victory
1315	War against Matthew III Csák	Kingdom of Bohemia	Máté Csák's domain	John of Bohemia	Battle of Holíč (1315)	Victory
1314–1322	Double reign of Holy Roman Empire	Kingdom of Bohemia; Louis IV.	Frederick the Fair	John of Bohemia	Battle of Mühldorf	Victory
1326–1332	Polish–Teutonic War	Kingdom of Bohemia Teutonic Order Others	Kingdom of Poland Grand Duchy of Lithuania Kingdom of Hungary	John of Bohemia		Treaty of Kalisz (1343)
1331–1332	War against Louis IV.	Kingdom of Bohemia	Holy Roman Empire	John of Bohemia	Battle of Mailberg (1332)	Defeat
1345–1348	Polish-Bohemian War	Kingdom of Bohemia	Kingdom of Poland (Piast)	John of Bohemia		Treaty of Namysłów
1346	Hundred Years' War	Kingdom of Bohemia; France	England	John of Bohemia		Defeat
1419–1434	Hussite Wars	Radical Hussites	Papal States; Holy Roman Empire; Utraquist hussites			Defeat of radicals
1437-1442	Hungarian–Ottoman War	Kingdom of Hungary; Taborites	Ottoman Empire	Sigismund of Luxembourg; John Jiskra of Brandýs	Siege of Szendrő	Victory
1438-1439	War of Bohemian succession	Kingdom of Bohemia; Electorate of Saxony; Holy Roman Empire	Kingdom of Poland; Hussites		Siege of Tábor (1438); Battle of Sellnitz	Defeat of Pro-Jagiellon side
1443–1444	Crusade of Varna	Kingdom of Bohemia; Kingdom of Poland; Kingdom of Hungary	Ottoman Empire	Władysław III; Jan Čapek of Sány		Defeat
1468–1478	Bohemian War	Kingdom of Bohemia	Kingdom of Hungary	George of Poděbrady	Battle of Vilémov	Treaty of Brno

== 1526–1918 ==
Year	War	Allies	Enemies	Conclusion
1530–1552	Little War in Hungary	Kingdom of Bohemia; Holy Roman Empire	Ottoman Empire	Indecisive
1546–1547	Schmalkaldic War	Kingdom of Bohemia; Holy Roman Empire; Spain	Schmalkaldic League	Victory
1611	Invasion of Passau Army	Kingdom of Bohemia	Roman Catholic Diocese of Passau	Victory
1618–1620	Bohemian Revolt	Bohemia	Holy Roman Empire	Defeat
1620–1648	Thirty Years' War	Bohemia; Holy Roman Empire; Spanish Empire	Protestant states	Peace of Westphalia
1680	Peasant Uprising	Czech Peasants	Austrian Empire	Defeat
1775	Peasant Uprising	Czech Peasants	Austrian Empire	Defeat
1848	Pentecostal Storm	Czechs	Austrian Empire	Defeat
1914–1918	World War I	Kingdom of Bohemia (as part of Austria-Hungary); Margraviate of Moravia (as part of Austria-Hungary); Central Powers	Allied Powers	Defeat
1914–1918	World War I	Czechoslovak Legions; Triple Entente	Central Powers	Victory
1917–1922	Russian Civil War	Czechoslovak Legions; White Movement	Russian Soviet Federative Socialist Republic	Legions did get in Vladivostok, White army defeated

== Since 1918 ==
Year	War	Allies	Enemies	Losses	Conclusion
1919	Polish–Czechoslovak War	Czechoslovakia	Poland	44-53 killed	Victory
1918–1920	Revolutions and interventions in Hungary	Czechoslovakia; Romania	Hungary	2824 killed or missing	Victory
1938	Sudeten German uprising	Czechoslovakia	German Insurgents	100 killed	Partially suppressed
1939	Axis invasion of Czechoslovakia	Czechoslovakia	Nazi Germany	1 killed	Defeat
1939	Hungarian Invasion of Carpatho-Ukraine	Czechoslovakia	Kingdom of Hungary; Ukrainian nationalists	40 killed	Defeat
1939–1945	World War II	Czechoslovak government-in-exile Allies	Axis powers	325,000 killed	Victory
1945	Racibórz Conflict	Czechoslovakia	Poland	None	Agreement
1945–1947	Operation B	Czechoslovakia; Poland; Soviet Union	Ukrainian Insurgent Army	49 killed	Victory
1948–1949	Israeli War of Independence	Israel supported by Czechoslovakia	Arab states	None	Victory
1952–1953	Korean War	Communist states including Czechoslovakia	South Korea; United Nations	None	Military stalemate; Ceasefire reached through Korean Armistice Agreement
1953	Merklín incident	Czechoslovakia	United States	None	Victory
1953	Uprising in Plzeň	Czechoslovakia	Plzeň workers	None	Uprising crushed
1955–1975	Vietnam War	Communist states including Czechoslovakia	South Vietnam; United States	None	Victory
1968	Warsaw Pact invasion of Czechoslovakia	Czechoslovakia	Warsaw Pact	137 killed	Defeat
1970s–1980s	Angolan Civil War	MPLA supported by: Czechoslovakia and others	UNITA	1 killed	Victory
1990–1991	Gulf War	Czechoslovakia; United States and other	Iraq	1 killed	Victory
1999	Kosovo War	NATO including the Czech Republic	Federal Republic of Yugoslavia	None	Victory
2002–2021	War in Afghanistan	Czech Republic; United States; United Kingdom and others	Insurgents	14 killed	Defeat
2003–2009	Iraq War	Czech Republic; United States; United Kingdom and others	Insurgents	1 killed	Victory
2004	Unrest in Kosovo	Czech Republic; Kosovo Force	Kosovo Albanians	None	Unrest suppressed Peace reached through mutual agreement
2011	First Libyan Civil War	Anti-Gaddafi movement NATO supported by the Czech Republic	Libya	None	Victory
2013–2022	Mali War	Czech Republic; Mali; France; ECOWAS	National Movement for the Liberation of Azawad; Al-Qaeda; Islamic State	None	Czech soldiers withdraw from Mali; The war continues
