= 1376 Lithuanian raid on Poland =

Lithuanian raid on Poland
Date	1376
Location	Lesser Poland
Result	Polish territory raided and approximately 23 000 people took into captivity, See Aftermath

Belligerents
Grand Duchy of Lithuania; Duchy of Belz	Kingdom of Poland

Commanders and leaders
Kęstutis; Liubartas; Jurgis Narimantaitis	Unknown

Lithuanian raid on Poland was an attack of Grand Duchy of Lithuania and Duchy of Belz on the Kingdom of Poland that took place in autumn 1376. It was led by Kęstutis, Liubartas and Jurgis Narimantaitis. During the attack, Lithuanian forces crossed the San river and marched along the Vistula river until they got near Tarnów. During the attack, they raided the passed area and took approximately 23 000 people into captivity . After the attack, they retreated to the Duchy of Belz.

== Aftermath ==
In 1377, Louis undertook a retaliatory expedition, besieging the castle in Bełz with the Hungarians, and the people of Lesser Poland and Sieradz, together with the Silesian princes: the Hungarian palatine Władysław of Opolczyk, Bolesław III and Konrad II of Oleśnica, recaptured Chełm, Horodło, Grabowiec and Sewołoż.
