= List of wars involving Slovakia =

This is a list of wars involving the Slovak Republic and its predecessor states. There have been 15 wars that ever included Slovakia, only one of them being after Slovakia became independent. The first war was the Hungarian–Czechoslovak War, which was between Hungary and Czechoslovakia. The most recent is the ongoing war on terror.

== List of wars ==
Date	Conflict	Combatant 1	Combatant 2	Result
First Czechoslovak Republic
1918–1919	Hungarian-Czechoslovak War	Czechoslovakia	Until 21 March 1919: Hungarian Republic; From 21 March 1919: Hungary	Victory
1919	Polish-Czechoslovak War	Czechoslovakia	Poland	Cieszyn Silesia divided between Czechoslovakia and Poland
Second Czechoslovak Republic
1938	Sudeten German uprising	Czechoslovakia	SdP sympathisers Germany	Uprising partially suppressed
Slovak Republic (partially recognised)
1939	Slovak-Hungarian War	Slovak Republic (1939–1945)	Hungary	Slovak defeat
1939–1945	World War II	Axis: Slovak Republic (1939–1945); Nazi Germany; Japan; Hungary	Allies: United States; Poland; France; Czechoslovakia; USSR	Victory of the Allies and Czechoslovakia (with the Slovak National Council on their side); defeat and dissolution of the Slovak Republic, which according to Czechoslovak law (and the theory of legal continuity) never existed. The current Slovak Republic does not consider itself a successor state of the wartime Slovak Republic.
Third Czechoslovak Republic
1948	1948 Czechoslovak coup d'état	Czechoslovakia	Communist Party Soviet Union	Appointment of a communist-dominated government
Czechoslovak Socialist Republic
1950–1953	Korean War	Czechoslovakia North Korea China USSR Bulgaria East Germany Hungary Poland Romania	South Korea United States United Nations	Military stalemate; Korean Conflict continues
1953	Air battle over Merklín	Czechoslovakia	United States	Czechoslovak victory; 1 American F-84 Thunderjet is shot down, but the pilot survives.
1953	Plzeň uprising of 1953	Czechoslovakia	Plzeň Workers	Czechoslovak victory; uprisings suppressed
1955–1975	Vietnam War	Czechoslovakia, North Vietnam, Viet Cong,, Khmer Rouge, Khmer Issarak, Pathet Lao, China, North Korea, Soviet Union, Cuba, Poland, Hungary, East Germany, Bulgaria, Romania	South Vietnam, United States, South Korea, Thailand, Australia, New Zealand, Laos, Khmer Republic, Philippines, Turkey, Spain, Taiwan, Brazil, Japan, Iran, Malaysia, West Germany, United Kingdom	North Vietnam-Viet Cong victory; formation of the Socialist Republic of Vietnam
1968–1975	Cambodian Civil War	Czechoslovakia; GRUNK; North Vietnam; Viet Cong; Soviet Union; China; Cuba; Romania	Cambodia; Khmer Republic; United States; South Vietnam; Australia; Canada France; Malaysia; Singapore; Thailand	GRUNK-North Vietnamese victory; establishment of Democratic Kampuchea
1968	Warsaw Pact invasion of Czechoslovakia	Czechoslovakia	Poland; Soviet Union; Bulgaria; East Germany; Hungary	Warsaw Pact victory
1978–1989	Cambodian-Vietnamese War	Czechoslovakia; Vietnam; Kampuchea; Soviet Union; Poland; East Germany	Democratic Kampuchea Thailand; China; Malaysia; Singapore; United Kingdom; United States (alleged)	Vietnamese victory; collapse of Democratic Kampuchea
Czech and Slovak Federative Republic
1990–1991	Gulf War	Czechoslovakia, Kuwait, United States, United Kingdom, Saudi Arabia, Egypt, France, Syria, Morocco, Oman, Pakistan, Canada, United Arab Emirates, Qatar, Bangladesh, Italy, Australia, Netherlands, Niger, Philippines, Sweden, Argentina, Senegal, Spain, Bahrain, Belgium, Poland, South Korea, Singapore, Norway, Greece, Denmark, New Zealand, Hungary	Iraq	Coalition victory
Slovakia
2001–present	War on terror	Slovakia NATO	Al-Qaeda ISIL Afghan Taliban Pakistani Taliban	Ongoing conflict • Taliban victory in the War in Afghanistan (2001–2021)
