= Kingdom of Lombardy =

The Kingdom of Lombardy could refer to:

- Kingdom of the Lombards (568–774), the independent state
- Kingdom of Italy (Holy Roman Empire) (855–1801), state of the Holy Roman Empire
- Kingdom of Lombardy–Venetia (1815–1866), state of the Austrian Empire
