= Battle of Lubusz (1209) =

War for lubusz
- Part of German–Polish Wars
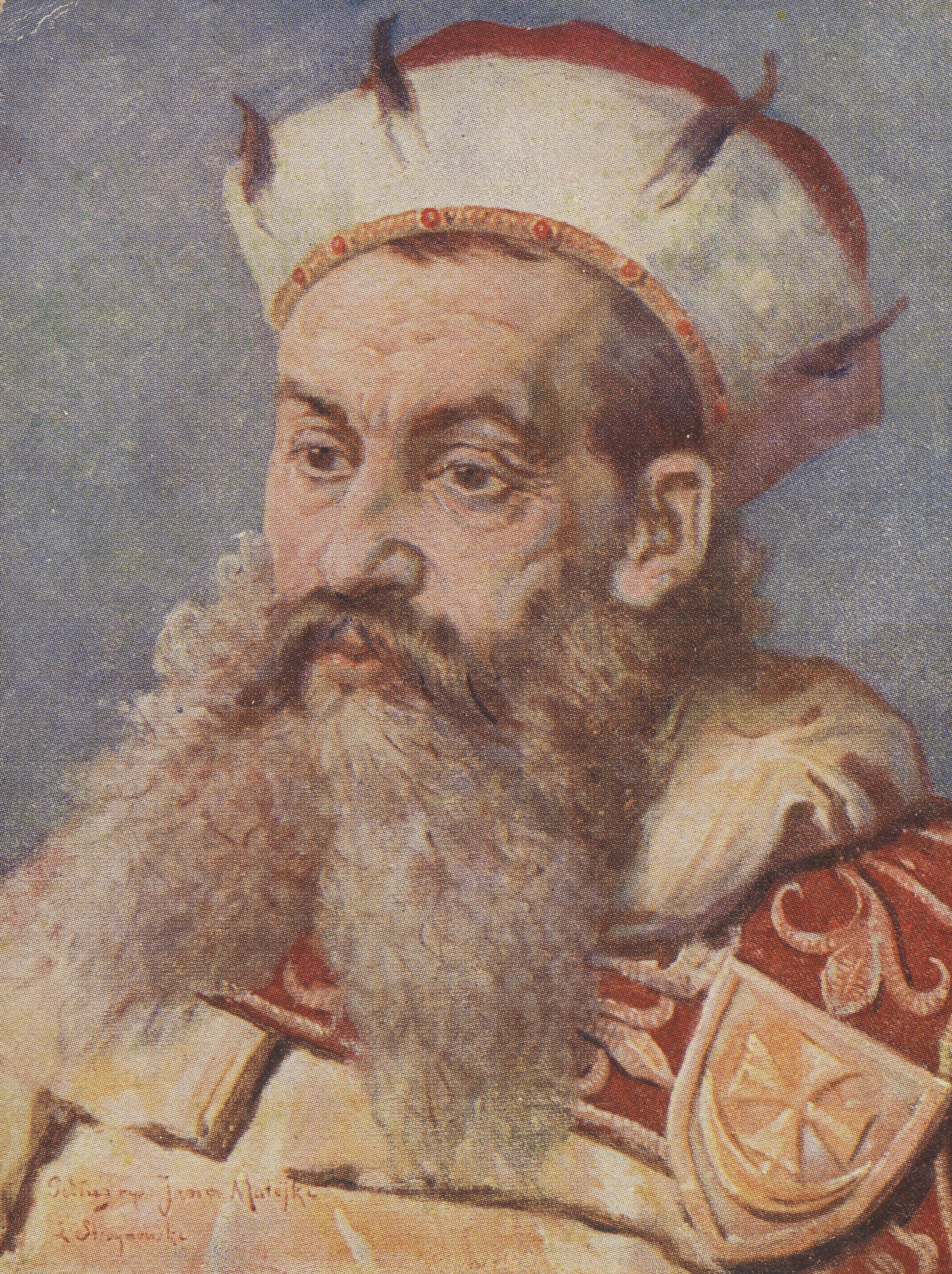
- Henry I the Bearded
| Date | 1209–1211 |
| Location | Lebus Land, Kingdom of Poland |
| Result | Polish victory |

Belligerents
| Duchy of Silesia; Duchy of Greater Poland | Margraviate of Brandenburg |

Commanders and leaders
| Henry I the Bearded; Władysław III Spindleshanks | Conrad II; Albert II |

Strength
| Unknown | Unknown |

,

The Battle of Lubusz (1209) was a battle between the Margraviate of Brandenburg and the Polish princes Władysław III Spindleshanks and Henry I the Bearded. The conflict eventually ended with a Polish victory in 1211 after a successful offensive by Duke Henry I the Bearded.

== Background ==
At the turn of the twelfth and thirteenth centuries, a German offensive was launched to control the remnants of the lands of the Western Slavs located between the Spree and Oder rivers and to seize the Lebus Land, considered at the time to be "the key to the Polish lands." The Lebus Land belonged to the Polish princes and was an important point in their policy toward Western Pomerania. It also served as an effective barrier defending Polish lands from German invasions, and was the place through which important tracts ran from the Saxon estates to Greater Poland and Pomerania.

In 1205, Margrave of Lower Lusatia Conrad II with his son-in-law Margrave of Brandenburg Albert II divided the sphere of influence. Albert planned to control the mouth of the Oder River, while Conrad was preparing with great vigor to take over part of the Lebus land, with Lebus at its head, located on the left bank of the Oder River. Thanks to the political agreement, the Lusatian margrave took control of Kopanica, a town that became the starting point for further warfare.

In 1207, as a result of an exchange with the Silesian Duke Henry I the Bearded, the land of Kalisz for the land of Lebus, the Duke of Greater Poland Wladyslaw III Spindleshanks became the owner of Lebus. The swap was crucial for the Duke of Greater Poland, as it allowed him to pursue an active policy on the Baltic coast.

== Battle ==
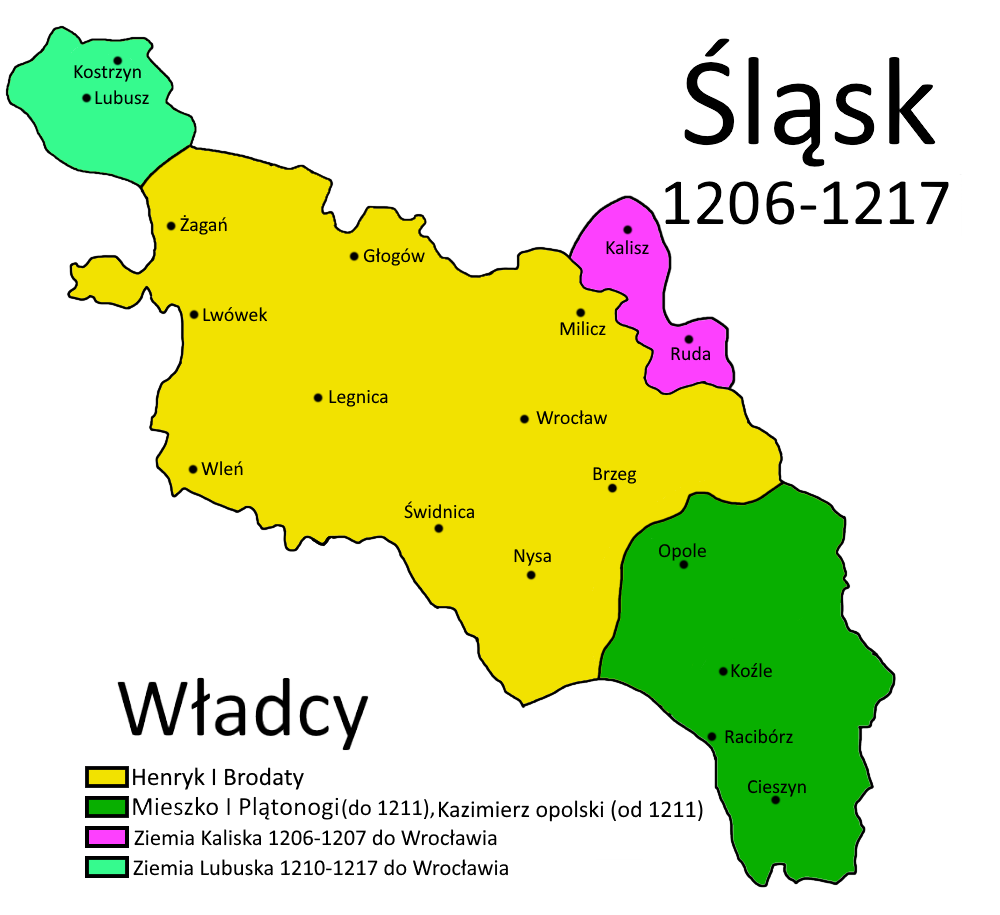
Silesia 1206-1217

In March 1209, after fortifying the stronghold in Kopanica, Margrave Conrad II entered the Lebus region and besieged Lebus. Władysław III Spindleshanks, who was the brother-in-law of Conrad II (his wife was Elisabeth Mieszkówna), set out to help the besieged castle. In accordance with the knightly ethos, the margrave Conrad was informed of the day and place of the battle ahead of him. However, on the eve of the scheduled clash, Prince Władysław crossed the Oder River and tried to surprise his opponent, which, according to the Meissen chronicles, did not please the knights accompanying him (they were also supposedly accompanied by a witch who bode victory). However, Prince Władysław failed to surprise Margrave Conrad, who learned of the planned attack and struck first. A battle ensued, in which Margrave Conrad's army was victorious. The late hour of the day allowed Prince Władysław' troops to retreat. However, during the difficult nighttime crossing of the swampy terrain, many people drowned, adding to the losses of the Polish side. The failed relief of Władysław Spindleshanks hastened the surrender of Lebus, and the defenders of the stronghold met a terrible fate - by order of Margrave Conrad, they were all killed by hanging.

== Aftermath ==
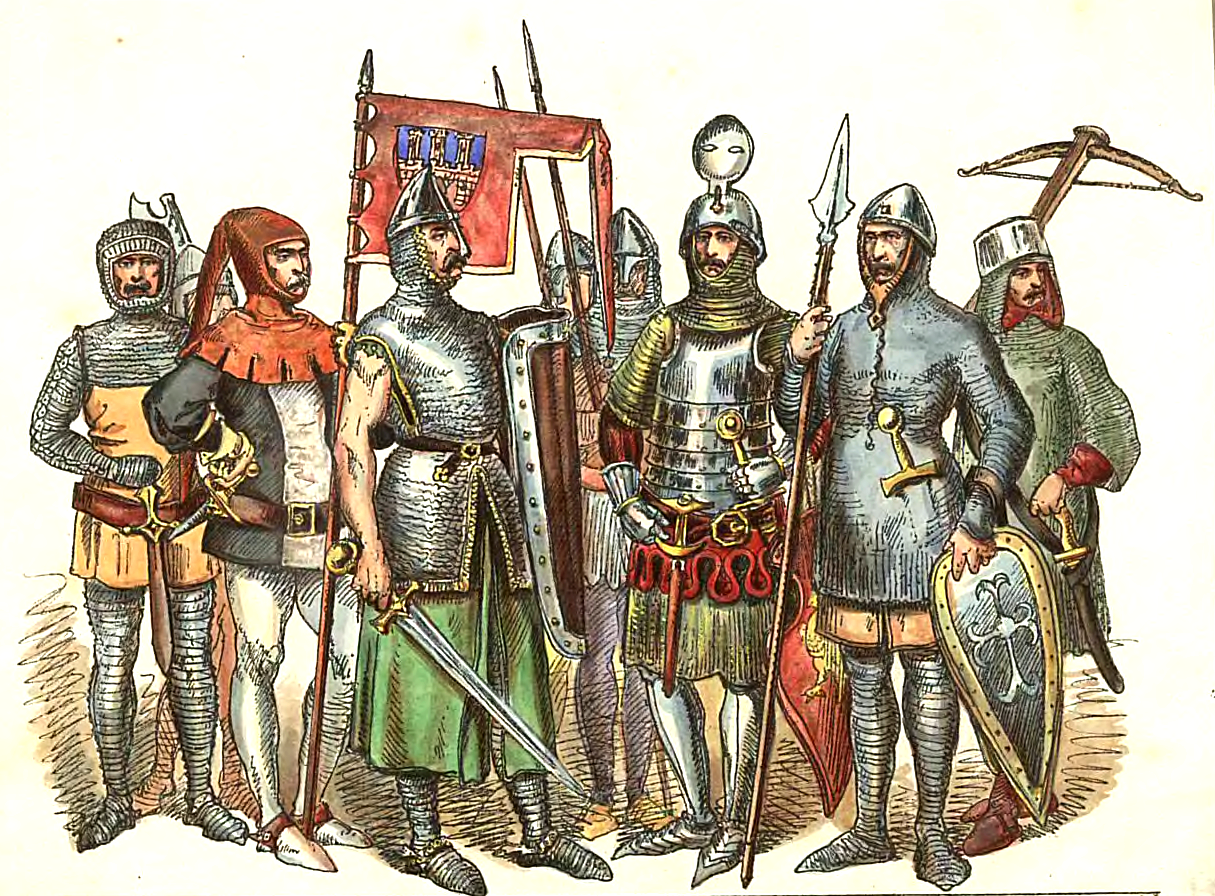
Polish medieval knights

The seizure of Lebus, which was important for Poland's western borders, mobilized Henry I the Bearded, Poland's most powerful prince, into action. He soon took advantage of the turmoil following the death of Margrave Conrad II (May 6, 1210) and disputes over his inheritance, since Conrad had left no male descendant. Henry the Bearded regained the territories lost by Władysław Spindleshanks during an armed campaign he carried out between August 1210 and March 1211. The Silesian prince entered the Lebus land and Lusatia and, in an unknown way, competing with Theodoric I, Margrave of Meissen, took control of the main strongholds, including Lebus and Gubin. Henry the Bearded's victorious action ended the "First War for Lebus."

== See also ==
- German-Polish Wars
- Lebus
- Henry I the Bearded
- Conrad II
- Władysław III Spindleshanks
