= Henry V's expedition to Poland =

Henry V's Polish expedition
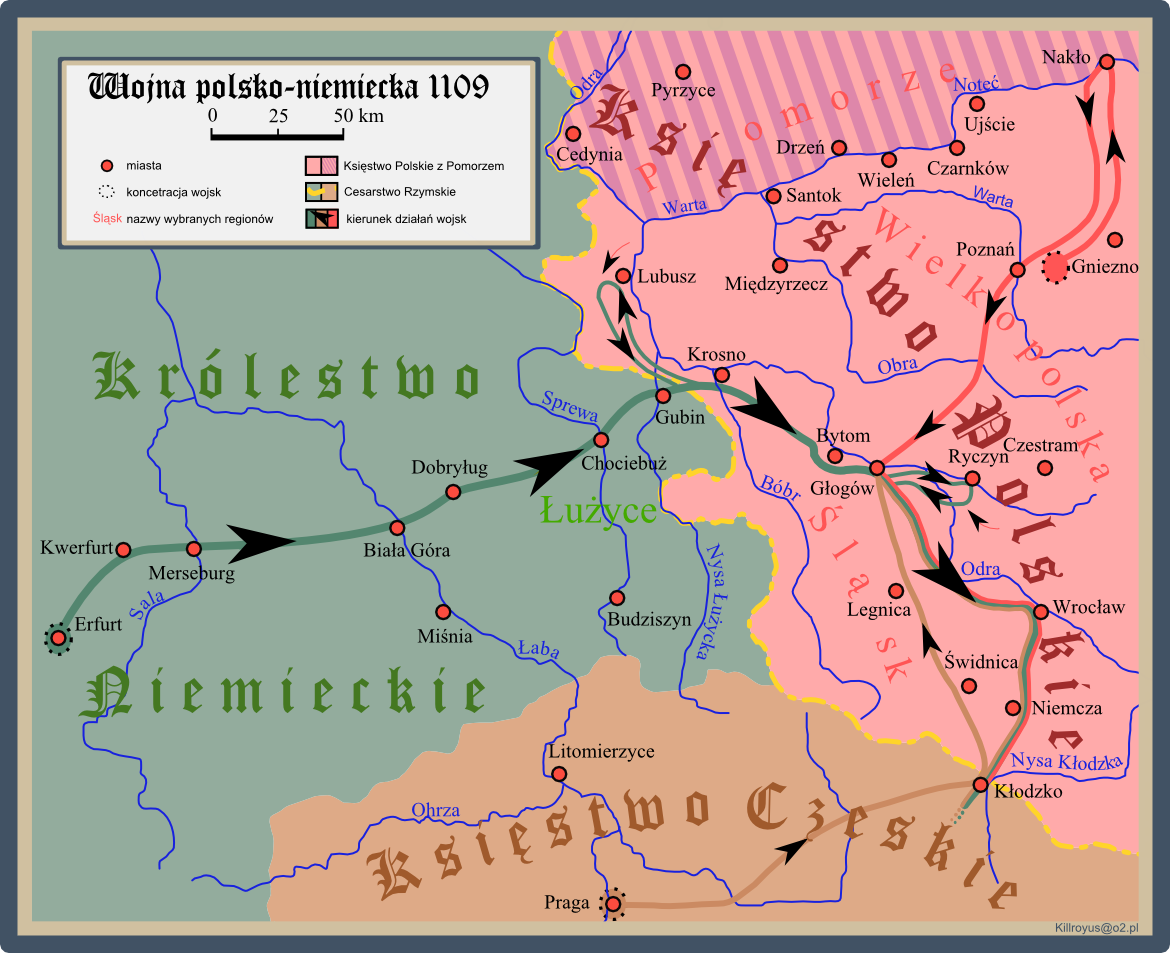
- German–Polish War (1109)
Date	Summer 1109
Location	Oder River, Silesia
Result	Polish victory

Belligerents
Kingdom of Poland	Holy Roman Empire; Duchy of Bohemia

Commanders and leaders
Bolesław III	Henry V Svatopluk

Strength
Unknown	10,000

Casualties and losses
Unknown	Heavy

This is the 1109 German-Polish War. For a list of all Polish-German Wars, see Polish-German Wars.

The Henry V's expedition to Poland, also known as the 1109 German-Polish War, was a conflict between Bolesław III Wrymouth and Henry V, the reason for the war was the exile from Poland of Bolesław's brother Zbigniew who sought support from the German Emperor to restore his power in the country. Henry V, Zbigniew and Bohemian Duke Svatopluk set out on an armed expedition into Poland, where they besieged the border town of Głogów, which they failed to conquer, but were also defeated in the Battle of Hundsfeld. The war ended with the defeat of German-Bohemian forces.

== Background ==
After a long-term rivalry within the ruling Piast dynasty, Bolesław III, in 1107, had finally expelled his older half-brother and co-ruler Duke Zbigniew from Poland. Zbigniew fled to the Holy Roman Empire where he sought help from King Henry V. The Emperor, however, did not take action as he was stuck in an inner-Hungarian rivalry, supporting the Árpád Prince Álmos against his brother King Coloman, and had started an armed expedition to Bratislava (Pozsony).

Henry tangled with Bolesław when the Polish duke, loyal to King Coloman, took the occasion to campaign in the Bohemian lands in 1108: as soon as the Bohemian Duke Svatopluk heard of the invasion, he left the Imperial army to oust the Polish troops. Left alone, King Henry was forced to abandon his Hungarian campaign.

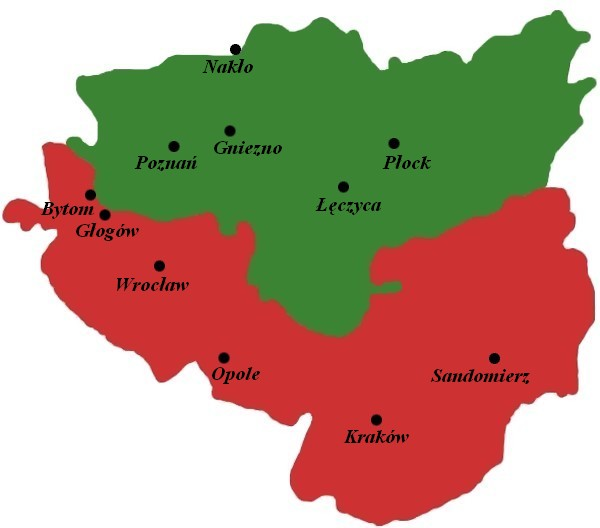
Division of Poland between Bolesław (red) and Zbigniew (green)

Angered under this defeat, Henry finally associated himself with Zbigniew and requested Bolesław to reinstate his half-brother as co-ruler, as well as to pay an annual tribute to the Empire. The Polish Duke categorically rejected both demands. The next year, the German forces gathered at Erfurt, crossed the Polish border near Krosno on the Bóbr River, and on St. Bartholomew's Day approached the fortified town of Głogów (Svatopluk's troops arrived in September). At first they defeated a Polish garrison which was stationed near the town. Bolesław fortified the Oder River strongholds and himself attacked Pomerania, inflicting defeat on the Pomeranian army at the Battle of Nakło on August 10.

== Siege of Głogów (1109) ==
According to Gallus Anonimus' Gesta principum Polonorum, King Henry resorted to lay siege to Głogów but granted its citizens a five-day ceasefire to ask their King for permission to surrender. He allegedly even made the townsmen give up their children as hostages as a guarantee of the ceasefire, and promised to give them back alive no matter what Bolesław's answer would be.

The Polish Duke, however, had no intention to hand over the city, and ordered the defense of Głogów. After the five days were up, King Henry began to barrage the town. Breaking his promise, he chained the child hostages to his siege engines, hoping that the people of Głogów would not shoot their own offspring, which would allow him to conquer the Polish settlement. However, Gallus stated that his cruelty towards children only strengthened the resolve of Głogów's defenders. Several harsh attacks by the Imperial army were repulsed, while Henry suffered significant losses by Polish guerilla fighters. After many days of unsuccessful fighting, the King was forced to abandon the siege and march south.

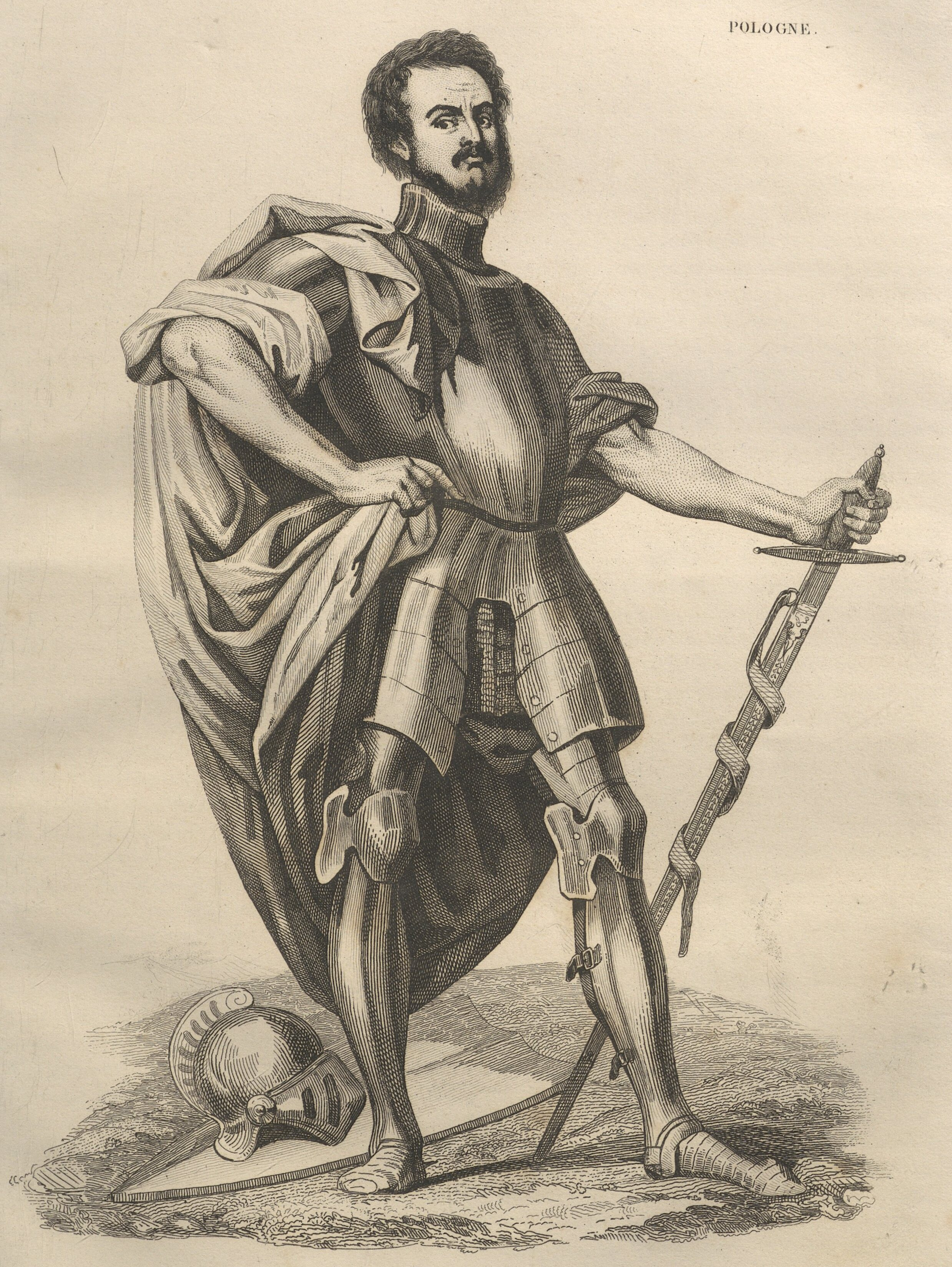
Zbigniew

== Battle of Hundsfeld (1109) ==
The contemporary author Gallus Anonymus in his Gesta principum Polonorum, written between 1112 and 1118, mentioned several armed encounters with the Imperial forces led by King Henry V of Germany. After Bolesław III had invaded the Bohemian territory of Duke Svatopluk, the German king in turn started a campaign in Poland and laid siege to the towns of Bytom Odrzański and Głogów, before he moved further down the Oder River and marched against Wrocław, though to no avail, after being defeated at the Battle of Hundsfeld by Bolesław's forces.

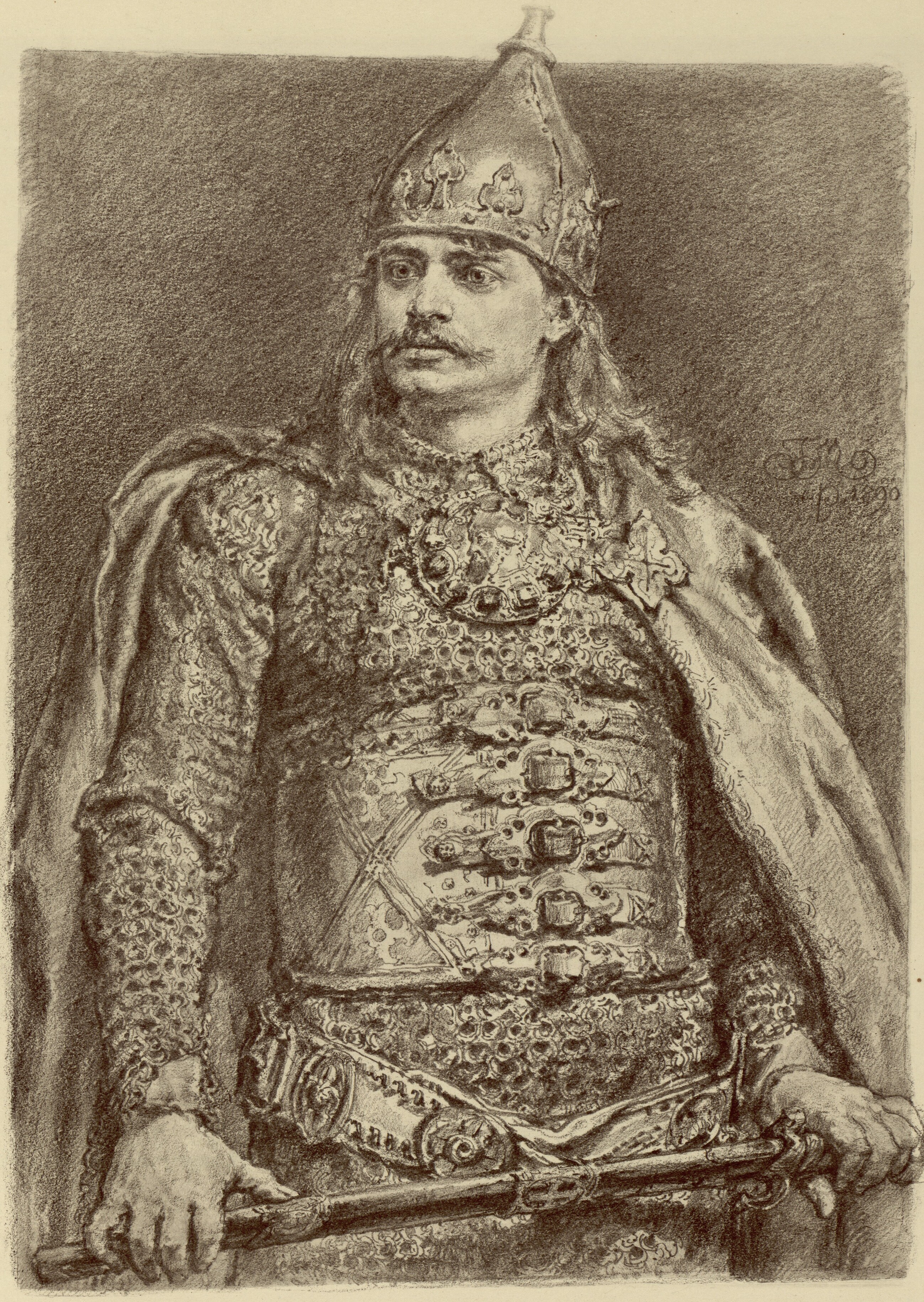
Bolesław III Wrymouth

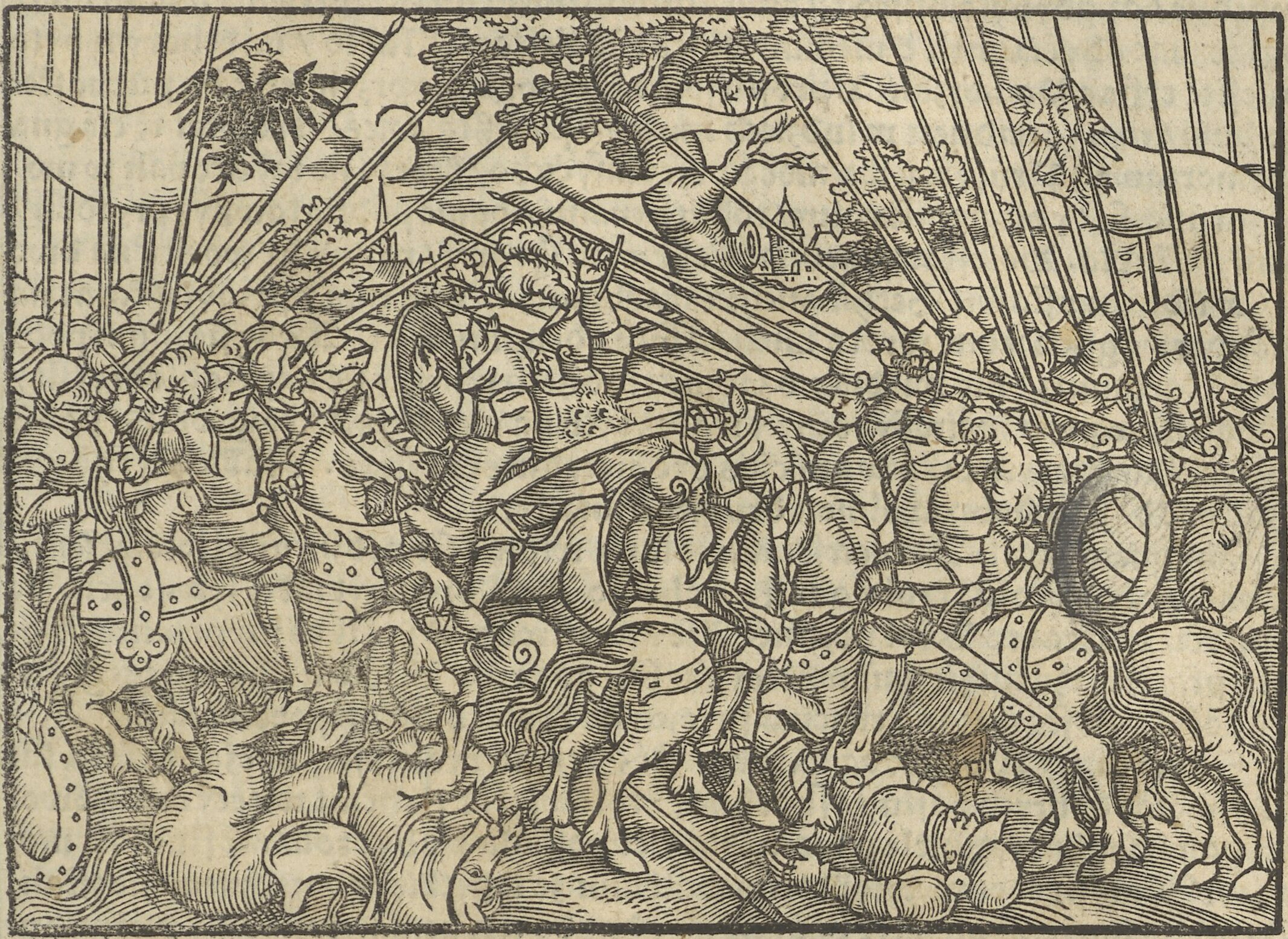
Battle of Hundsfeld

According to Wincenty Kadłubek, the Germans were ambushed by the Polish forces and the result was a complete victory of Bolesław III Wrymouth, whereafter King Henry withdrew from Poland. After the encounter, due to the many dead and dying left on the battlefield; Kadłubek remarked, that the "...dogs which, devouring so many corpses, fell into a mad ferocity, so that no one dared venture there." Hence, the site became known as "dogs' field" (Polish: Psie Pole, German: Hundsfeld).

Kadłubek's relation was questioned in the late 19th century Encyklopedia Powszechna by Samuel Orgelbrand. Present-day historians are split on the issue, with some arguing that the battle was rather an unimportant skirmish, and the Chronica, written at the court of Bolesław's son Casimir II the Just almost hundred years after the event, is not fully reliable. Though, regardless of the magnitude, the clash contributed to Henry V's retreat.

== Aftermath ==
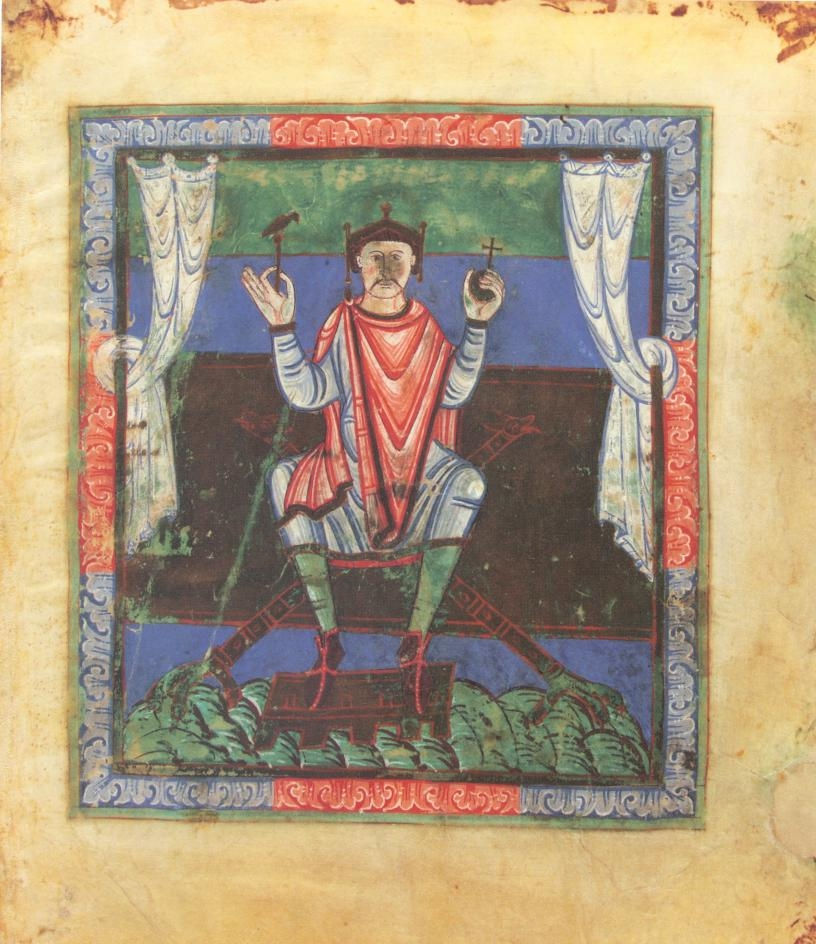
Henry V

King Henry's campaign turned out to be a complete failure, when it ended in Bolesław's final victory at the Battle of Hundsfeld (Psie Pole). Duke Svatopluk was assassinated - probably by Bohemian Vršovci liensmen - still at the Głogów camp on September 21. His successor, Vladislaus, reconciled with Bolesław, whereafter Zbigniew was able to return to Poland in 1111, only to be arrested and blinded by his half-brother shortly afterwards. Bolesław's position towards the Empire was strengthened, and in the following years he was able to consolidate his rule in Pomerania and Lubusz Land. It was not until 1157, when Emperor Frederick Barbarossa in aid of the Silesian Duke Władysław II the Exile launched a successful campaign to the Polish lands.

After centuries-long ambivalent relations with Germany, the successful defense and the tradition of Henry's cruelty had evolved to a key element in the memory of the Polish nation. A first memorial stone was erected by the Głogów citizens on the occasion of the 850th anniversary of the battle in 1959. On 1 September 1979 a large Socialist Realistic memorial to the Głogów children was inaugurated to commemorate not only the 870th anniversary but also the 40th memorial day of the German Invasion of Poland.
