= German–Polish War (1028–1031) =

Date	1028–1031
Location	Lusatia, Moravia, Saxony, Poland, Red Ruthenia
Result	German-Rus’-Bohemian victory

Belligerents
Holy Roman Empire; Duchy of Saxony; Duchy of Bohemia (from 1029); Kievan Rus' (from 1030); Kingdom of Hungary (1031)	Kingdom of Poland; Kingdom of Hungary (1029–1031)

Commanders and leaders
Conrad II; Bretislav I (from 1029); Yaroslav the Wise (from 1030); Stephen I of Hungary (1029–1031)	Mieszko II Lambert; Stephen I of Hungary (1029–1031)

The German–Polish War (Note: Polish: wojna polsko-niemiecka) was a conflict fought between 1028 and 1031. It was fought by the Holy Roman Empire led by Conrad II, the Duchy of Bohemia led by Bretislav I, the Kievan Rus' led by Yaroslav the Wise and, from 1031, the Kingdom of Hungary led by Stephen I, against the Kingdom of Poland led by Mieszko II Lambert and, until 1031, the Kingdom of Hungary led by Stephen I. The war had begun with Polish attacks on Saxony within the Holy Roman Empire. Following that, the Empire and the Kievan Rus' had attacked Poland, winning the war in 1031. Following the German victory, Mieszko II Lambert was forced to abdicate, losing the title of the King of Poland, and his country being reformed into the Duchy of Poland, with Bezprym as a duke.

== The conflict ==
In 1026, King Conrad II of Germany went to Italy for his coronation as the Holy Roman Emperor. His absence increased the activity of the opposition in the Holy Roman Empire centered around Dukes Ernest II of Swabia and Frederick II of Upper Lorraine. Conrad II's opponents conspired to acquire Mieszko's favor. Historical evidence of these efforts is in the prayer book sent to Mieszko by Frederick's wife, Matilda of Swabia, around 1027. The volume is entitled: officiorum Liber quem ordinem Romanum apellant. In it, a miniature showed the Duchess presenting the Book to Mieszko II while sitting on a throne. The gift was accompanied by a letter, wherein Matilda named him a distinguished king and a model for the spread of Christianity. Also written was praise of the merits of Mieszko II in the building of new churches, as well his knowledge of Latin, very unusual in those times when Greek was more widely used. In this book are found the earliest records of the Kingdom of Poland: neumes at the margins of the sequence Ad célèbres rex celica. The gift caused the expected effect, and Mieszko II promised to take military action. The preparations for the war began in the autumn of 1027. In the middle of that year, Conrad II returned to Germany and began to fight the rebels. Soon, he defeated Duke Ernest II, depriving him of his lands. Only when the rebel fight was nearly lost did Mieszko II arrive to their aid. In 1028, Polish troops invaded Saxony and took a number of prisoners. The devastation was so great that, according to Saxon sources, "where Mieszko II's troops put their feet grass never thence grew". The Emperor accused the Polish ruler of an illegal coronation as King and declared him a usurper. This invasion involved the lands of the Lutici tribe. In October 1028, the Emperor's opportunity came as the Lutici district of Pöhlde asked the Emperor to defend against the attacks of Mieszko II, promising support in the fight against the Polish ruler. Despite the treaty which secured peace between Poland and Germany, the Emperor soon armed a retaliatory expedition against Mieszko II. Conrad II's army arrived to Lusatia in the autumn of 1029 and began the siege of Bautzen, but the German troops did not receive the promised support of the Lutici tribe and the expedition failed. Threatened by the Hungarians, the Emperor was forced to retreat.

Probably in this same year, the son of Oldřich, Bretislaus I, attacked and took Moravia.

In 1030, Mieszko II secured an alliance with Hungary and once again invaded Saxony. In the meanwhile, his southern ally attacked Bavaria and temporarily occupied Vienna.

In response, the Emperor organized another expedition against the Polish king, this time by organizing a coalition against Mieszko II. Already in 1030, Yaroslav I the Wise began the offensive and conquered Red Ruthenia and some Bełz castles.

In 1031, the Emperor concluded peace with the Kingdom of Hungary. Probably in exchange for Stephen I's support, Conrad II ceded to Hungary the territories between the Leitha and Fischa Rivers. Now that the Emperor was less concerned about an attack from the south, in the autumn of 1031, he went on the offensive against Poland and besieged Milsko. The offensive ended with complete success, and Mieszko II was forced to surrender some lands. As a result, the Polish King lost portions of the lands taken by his father, who warred often against Emperor Henry II.

When Mieszko II was busy defending Lusatia from the troops of Conrad II, the Kievan expedition came from the east with Yaroslav I the Wise as the leader. In 1031, Poland was invaded and then Bezprym was settled on the throne. Mieszko II and his family were forced to flee the country. Queen Richeza and her children found refuge in Germany. The King could not escape to Hungary because, during his travel, he was stopped by Rus' troops. King Stephen I of Hungary was not favorable to accepting him in his country. Without alternatives, Mieszko II went to Bohemia. Duke Oldřich once again imprisoned him. This time, the King could not count on Imperial support. Mieszko II was not only imprisoned but also castrated, which was to be a punishment to Bolesław I the Brave, who blinded Duke Boleslaus III the Red (Oldřich's brother) thirty years before. Mieszko II and his wife never reunited again; according to some sources, they were either officially divorced, or only separated.

== Notable battles ==
- Siege of Bautzen

== Bibliography ==
- Gall Anonim. Kronika polska. Wrocław: Zakład Narodowy im. Ossolińskich. 2003. ISBN 83-04-04610-5.
- Oswald Balzer. Genealogia Piastów. Kraków. 1895.
- Roman Grodecki, S. Zachorowski, J. Dąbrowski. Dzieje Polski średniowiecznej, vol. 1. Kraków. 1995. ISBN 83-7052-230-0.
- Kazimierz Jasiński. Rodowód pierwszych Piastów. Wrocław–Warsaw. 1992. ISBN 83-85218-32-7.
- Feliks Koneczny. Dzieje Polski za Piastów. Kraków. 1902.
- Gerard Labuda. Mieszko II król Polski (1025–1034) in Rozprawy Akademii Umiejętności, vol. 73. Kraków. Wydział Historyczno-Filozoficzny. 1992. ISBN 83-85483-46-2.
- Gerard Labuda. Pierwsze państwo polskie. Kraków. Krajowa Agencja Wydawnicza. 1989. ISBN 83-03-02969-X.
- Anatol Lewicki. Mieszko II in Rozprawy Akademii Umiejętności, vol. 5. Kraków. Wydział Historyczno-Filozoficzny. 1876.
- Ludwik Stomma. Królów polskich i francuskich przypadki. Warsaw. 2000. ISBN 83-87988-69-3.
- Stanisław Szczur. Historia Polski średniowiecze. Państwo Bolesława Chrobrego. Kraków. Wydawnictwo Literackie. 2002. ISBN 83-08-03272-9.
- Jerzy Lesław Wyrozumski. Dzieje Polski piastowskiej (VIII w.–1370). Kraków. 1999. ISBN 83-85719-38-5.
- Benedykt Zientara. Poczet Królów i Książąt Polski. Warsaw. Czytelnik. 1988. ISBN 83-07-01822-6.
