= Family tree of Bohemian monarchs =

Family tree of Bohemian monarchs

PŘEMYSLID
Bořivoj I c. 852 – c. 889; Duke of Bohemia r. c. 870 – c. 889	Ludmila of Sorbia c. 860–921
Spytihněv I 875–894; Duke of Bohemia r. 875–915	Vratislaus I 888–921; Duke of Bohemia r. 915–921	Drahomíra of Stodor c. 877–934
Wenceslaus I (Václav the Good); 911–935; Duke of Bohemia r. 921–935	Boleslaus I the Cruel c. 915–972; Duke of Bohemia r. 935–972	Biagota b. c. 901	Lothair II; 928–950; King of Italy	Saint Adelaide of Italy; 931–999	Otto I the Great; 912–973; Holy Roman Emperor	Taksony; 931–c. 970; Grand Prince of the Hungarians
PIAST
Emma of Italy c. 948–987	Boleslaus II the Pious c. 930–999; Duke of Bohemia r. 972–999	Eadgifu of England	Doubravka of Bohemia c. 940–977	Mieszko I of Poland; 930–992	Otto II the Red; 955–983; Holy Roman Emperor	Vladimir I the Great; 958–1015; Prince of Kiev	Michael of the Hungarians c. 960–997	Géza c. 940–997; Grand Prince of the Hungarians
Jaromir d. 1038; Duke of Bohemia r. 1003, r. 1004–1012, r. 1033–1034	Oldřich c. 975–1034/1042; Duke of Bohemia r. 1012–1033, r. 1034	Božena Křesinová d. c. 1052	Boleslaus III the Red c. 965–1037; Duke of Bohemia r. 999–1002, r. 1003	Vladivoj; 981–1003; Duke of Bohemia r. 1002–1003	Boleslaus IV the Brave c. 967–1025; Duke of Bohemia r. 1003–1004 also King of Poland	Emnilda of Lusatia c. 973–1017	Matilda of Germany; 979–1025	Otto Orseolo c. 992–1032; Doge of Venice	Grimelda of Hungary	Saint Stephen I c. 975–1038; Grand Prince of the Hungarians
Bretislaus I 1002–1055; Duke of Bohemia r. 1035–1055	Judith of Schweinfurt; 1003–1058	Peter Orseolo; 1011–c. 1059; King of Hungary	Frozza Orseolo; 1015–1071	Mieszko II Lambert c. 990–1034; King, then Duke of Poland	Richeza of Lotharingia c. 997–1063	Vazul of Nitra c. 997–1031	Yaroslav I the Wise; 978–1054; Grand Prince of Kiev
Conrad I of Brno c. 1035–1092; Duke of Bohemia r. 1092	Ernest of Austria; 1027–1075	Spytihněv II; 1031–1061; Duke of Bohemia r. 1055–1061	Maria Dobroniega of Kiev; 1012–1087	Casimir I of Poland; 1016–1058	Richeza of Poland; 1013–1075	Béla I of Hungary c. 1015–1063; King of Hungary	Andrew I c. 1015–1060; King of Hungary	Anastasia of Kiev; 1023–1096	Iziaslav I 1024–1078; Grand Prince of Kiev	Vsevolod I 1030–1093; Grand Prince of Kiev
Otto I of Olomouc; 1045–1097	Euphemia of Hungary c. 1055–1111	Leopold of Znojmo d. 1112	Henry I of Berg c. 1070–1115	Świętosława of Poland; 1047–1126	Vratislaus II c. 1032–1092; Duke of Bohemia r. 1061–1085 then King of Bohemia r. 1085–1092	Adelaide of Hungary; 1040–1062	Leopold II the Fair of Austria; 1050–1095	Géza I c. 1040–1077; King of Hungary	daughter of Spytihněv II name unknown	Sviatopolk II; 1050–1113; Grand Prince of Kiev
Svatopluk the Lion d. 1109; Duke of Bohemia r. 1107–1109	Conrad II of Znojmo d. 1161	Richeza of Berg c. 1095–1125	Vladislaus I c. 1065–1125; Duke of Bohemia r. 1109–1117, r. 1120–1125	Bořivoj II c. 1064–1124; Duke of Bohemia r. 1100–1107, r. 1117–1120	Gerberga of Austria d. 1142	Leopold III; 1073–1136; Margrave of Austria	Bretislaus II c. 1060–1100; Duke of Bohemia r. 1092–1100	Coloman c. 1070–1116; King of Hungary and Croatia	Álmos of Hungary d. 1127	Predslava of Kiev fl. 1104–1107	Vladimir II Monomakh; 1053–1125; Grand Prince of Kiev
Judith of Bohemia; 1058–1086	Władysław I Herman of Poland c. 1044–1102	Conrad II Otto; 1136–1191; Duke of Bohemia r. 1189–1191	unknown daughter	Soběslav (Sobeslaus) I c. 1075–1140; Duke of Bohemia r. 1125–1140	Adelaide of Hungary; 1107–1140	Béla II; 1109–1141; King of Hungary and Croatia	Msitislav I the Great; 1076–1132; Grand Prince of Kiev
Zbyslava of Kiev c. 1085–1114	Bolesław III Wrymouth of Poland; 1086–1138	Salomea of Berg c. 1100–1144	Henry of Bohemia d. c. 1169	Judith of Thuringia c. 1135–1174	Vladislaus II c. 1110–1172; Duke of Bohemia r. 1140–1158 then King of Bohemia r. 1158–1172	Gertrude of Babenberg c. 1118–1150	Henry II Jasomirgott of Austria; 1112–1177	Yaroslav Osmomysl of Halych c. 1135–1187	Soběslav (Sobeslaus) II the King of the Peasants c. 1128–1180; Duke of Bohemia r. 1173–1178	Wenceslaus II; 1137–aft. 1192; Duke of Bohemia r. 1191–1192	Géza II; 1130–1162; King of Hungary and Croatia	Euphrosyne of Kiev c. 1130–1193
Casimir II the Just of Poland; 1138–1194	Mieszko III the Old of Poland; 1127–1202	Elizabeth of Hungary c. 1128–1154	Bretislaus III; Henry Bretislav d. 1197; Duke of Bohemia r. 1193–1197	Leopold V of Austria; 1157–1194	Frederick I c. 1142–1189; Duke of Bohemia r. 1172–1173, r. 1178–1189	Elizabeth of Hungary d. 1189	Isaac II Angelos; 1156–1204; Byzantine Emperor	Béla III c. 1148–1196; King of Hungary and Croatia	Alexios III Angelos c. 1153–1211; Byzantine Emperor
Constance of Hungary c. 1180–1240	Odon of Poznań c. 1149–1194	Viacheslava Yaroslavna of Halych	Vladislaus III Henry c. 1160–1222; Duke of Bohemia r. 1197	Irene Angelina c. 1181–1208	Přemysl Ottokar I c. 1155–1230; Duke of Bohemia r. 1192–1193, r. 1197–1198 then King of Bohemia r. 1198–1230	Constance of Hungary c. 1180–1240	Andrew II c. 1177–1235; King of Hungary and Croatia	Anna Komnene Angelina c. 1176–1212	Ludmilla of Bohemia d. 1240
WITTELSBACH
Casimir I of Kuyavia c. 1211–1267	Maria of Swabia; 1201–1235	Władysław Odonic of Poland c. 1190–1239	Jadwiga of Bohemia d. 1249	Leopold VI of Austria; 1176–1230	Kunigunde of Hohenstaufen; 1202–1248	Wenceslaus I the One-Eyed c. 1205–1230–1253	Anne of Bohemia c. 1203–1265	Béla IV; 1206–1270; King of Hungary and Croatia	Maria Laskarina of Nicaea c. 1206–1270	Otto II of Bavaria; 1206–1253
HABSBURG	MEINHARDINER
Bolesław of Greater Poland c. 1225–1279	Blessed Jolanta of Hungary; 1235–1298	Henry III of Brabant c. 1230–1261	Adelaide of Burgundy c. 1233–127	Przemysł I of Greater Poland; 1221–1257	Elisabeth of Wrocław c. 1232–1265	Stephen V 1239–1272; King of Hungary and Croatia	Anna of Hungary b. 1226	Rudolf I of Germany; 1218–1291	Meinhard of Carinthia; 1238–1295	Elisabeth of Bavaria c. 1227–1273	Louis II of Bavaria; 1229–1294
Jadwiga of Greater Poland; 1266–1339	Władysław I of Poland c. 1260–1333	Mary of Hungary c. 1257–1323	John I of Brabant; 1253–1294	Margaret of Flanders d. 1285	Przemysł II of Poland; 1257–1296	Violant of Hungary c. 1215–1251	Margaret of Austria c. 1204–1266	Přemysl Ottokar II; 1233–1278; King of Bohemia r. 1253–1278	Cunigunde of Halych; 1245–1285	Albert I of Germany; 1255–1308	Elizabeth of Carinthia c. 1262–1312
Charles Martel of Anjou; 1271–1295; Titular King of Hungary and Croatia	Isabella of Aragon c. 1248–1271	Margaret of Brabant; 1276–1311	Henry VII; 1278–1313; Holy Roman Emperor	Rudolf I c. 1282–1307; King of Bohemia r. 1306–1307	Elizabeth Richeza of Poland; 1288–1335	Wenceslaus II Přemyslid; 1271–1305; King of Bohemia r. 1278–1305 also King of Poland	Judith of Habsburg; 1271–1297	Otto III of Carinthia c. 1265–1310	Rudolf I of Bavaria; 1274–1319
Casimir III the Great of Poland; 1310–1370	Elizabeth of Poland; 1305–1380; Queen of Hungary	Charles I Robert; 1288–1342; King of Hungary and Croatia	Charles of Valois; 1270–1325	John the Blind; 1296–1346; King of Bohemia r. 1310–1346	Elizabeth of Bohemia; 1292–1330	Wenceslaus III; 1289–1306; King of Bohemia r. 1305–1306 also King of Hungary, Croatia, and Poland	Frederick I of Celje c. 1300–1359	Anne of Bohemia; 1290–1313	Henry c. 1265–1335; King of Bohemia r. 1307–1310	Albert II of Austria; 1298–1358	Anne of Carinthia-Tyrol; 1300–1331	Rudolf II of the Palatinate; 1306–1353
JAGIELLONIANS
Elizabeth of Poland; 1326–1361; Duchess of Pomerania	Louis I of Hungary and Poland; 1326–1382; King of Hungary, Croatia, and Poland	Catherine of Hungary d. 1355	Algirdas of Lithuania c. 1296–1377; Grand Duke of Lithuania	Hermann I of Celje; 1333–1385	Ulrich I of Celje; 1331–1368	Leopold III; 1351–1386; Duke of Austria	Albert III of Austria; 1349–1395; Duke of Austria	Adolf of the Palatinate; 1300–1327	Louis IV; 1282–1347; Holy Roman Emperor
Elizabeth of Pomerania c. 1347–1393	Anna of Świdnica-Jawor; 1339–1362	Charles I 1316–1347–1378; King of Bohemia r. 1346–1378 also Holy Roman Emperor	Blanche of Valois; 1317–1348	Anne of the Palatinate; 1329–1353	Herman II of Celje c. 1360–1435	Alexandra of Lithuania d. 1434	Rupert II of the Palatinate; 1325–1398
Mary I of Hungary; 1371–1395	Sigismund; 1368–1437; King of Bohemia r. 1419–1437 also King of Hungary and Croatia and Holy Roman Emperor	Barbara of Cilli; 1392–1451	Wenceslaus IV the Idle; 1361–1419; King of Bohemia r. 1378–1419	Albert IV of Austria; 1377–1404	Anna of Poland; 1366–1425	William of Celje; 1361–1392	Ernest the Iron of Austria; 1377–1424	Cymburgis of Mazovia c. 1394–1429	Rupert of Germany; 1352–1410	Stephen II of Bavaria; 1319–1375
KUNŠTÁT-Z PODĚBRAD
Kunigunde of Sternberg; 1425–1449	George of Poděbrady; 1420–1471; King of Bohemia r. 1458–1471	Joanna of Rožmitál c. 1430–1475	Jadwiga of Poland c. 1373–1399; King of Poland	Elizabeth of Luxembourg; 1409–1442	Albert the Magnanimous; 1397–1439; King of Bohemia r. 1437–1439 also King of Hungary and Croatia	Sophia of Halshany; 1405–1461	Władysław II Jagiełło c. 1352–1434; Grand Duke of Lithuania; King of Poland	Anna of Cilli c. 1381–1416	Frederick III; 1415–1493; Holy Roman Emperor	Stephen of Simmern-Zweibrücken; 1385–1459	John II of Bavaria; 1341–1397
Margaret of Austria c. 1416–1486	Ladislaus the Posthumous; 1440–1457; King of Bohemia r. 1453–1457 also King of Hungary and Croatia	Elizabeth of Austria; 1436–1505	Casimir IV Andrew of Poland; 1427–1492; Grand Duke of Lithuania; King of Poland	Maximilian I 1459–1519; Holy Roman Emperor	Frederick I of the Palatinate-Simmern; 1417–1480	Ernest of Bavaria; 1373–1438
HUNYADI
Matthias Corvinus; 1443–1490; King of Bohemia r. 1469–1490 also King of Hungary and Croatia	Catherine of Kunštát-Podĕbrady; 1449–1464	Sidonie of Kunštát-Poděbrady; 1449–1510	Albert III of Saxony; 1443–1500	Kunigunde of Austria; 1465–1520	Albert IV of Bavaria; 1447–1508	Vladislaus I of Bohemia; 1456–1516; King of Bohemia r. 1471–1516 also King of Hungary and Croatia	Anne of Foix-Candale; 1484–1506	Philip I 1478–1506; King of Castile	John I of the Palatinate-Simmern; 1459–1509
George of Saxony; 1471–1539	Barbara of Poland; 1478–1534	William IV of Bavaria; 1493–1550	Mary of Castile and Austria; 1505–1558	Louis I of Bohemia; 1506–1526; King of Bohemia r. 1516–1526 also King of Hungary and Croatia	Anne of Bohemia and Hungary; 1503–1547	Ferdinand I 1503–1564; King of Bohemia r. 1526–1564 also King of Hungary and Croatia and Holy Roman Emperor	Charles V 1500–1558; King of Spain and Holy Roman Emperor	John II of the Palatinate-Simmern; 1492–1557
Frederick III of the Palatinate; 1515–1576	Christine of Saxony; 1505–1549	Anna of Austria; 1528–1590	Albert V of Bavaria; 1528–1579	William I/X of Mantua-Montferrat; 1538–1587	Eleanor of Austria; 1534–1594	Maximilian I of Bohemia; 1527–1576; King of Bohemia r. 1562–1576 also King of Hungary and Croatia and Holy Roman Emperor	Maria of Austria and Spain; 1528–1603
Louis VI of the Palatinate; 1539–1583	Elizabeth of Hesse; 1539–1582	William V of Bavaria; 1548–1626	Maria Anna of Bavaria; 1551–1608	Charles II Francis of Inner Austria; 1540–1590	Anna Juliana Gonzaga; 1566–1621	Ferdinand II of Further Austria; 1529–1595	Rudolf II; 1552–1612; King of Bohemia r. 1576–1611 also Holy Roman Emperor	Anna of Austria; 1549–1580	Philip II; 1527–1598; King of Spain
Frederick IV of the Palatinate; 1574–1610	Maria Anna of Bavaria; 1574–1616	Ferdinand II; 1578–1617; King of Bohemia r. 1617–1619, 1620–1637 also Holy Roman Emperor	Anna of Austria-Tyrol; 1575–1618	Matthias I of Bohemia; 1557–1619; King of Bohemia r. 1611–1619 also Holy Roman Emperor	Margaret of Austria; 1584–1611	Philip III; 1578–1621; King of Spain	Ferdinand I of Tuscany; 1549–1609
Frederick the Winter King; 1596–1632; King of Bohemia r. 1619–1620	Magdalene of Bavaria; 1587–1628	Maximilian I of Bavaria; 1573–1651	Maria Anna of Austria; 1610–1665	Ferdinand III; 1608–1657; King of Bohemia r. 1637–1657 also Holy Roman Emperor	Maria Anna of Spain; 1606–1646	Leopold V of Austria; 1586–1632	Claudia of Tuscany; 1604–1648	Cosimo II of Tuscany; 1590–1621	Maria Magdalena of Austria; 1589–1631
Charles I Louis, Elector Palatine; 1617–1680	Edward of the Palatinate-Simmern; 1625–1663	Philip William of the Palatinate; 1615–1690	Ferdinand IV; 1633–1654; King of Bohemia r. 1646–1654 also King of Hungary and Croatia	Mariana of Austria; 1634–1696	Philip IV; 1605–1665; King of Spain	Ferdinand Charles of Austria; 1628–1662	Anna of Tuscany; 1616–1676
Elizabeth Charlotte of the Palatinate; 1652–1722	John III Sobieski; 1629–1696; King of Poland	Benedicta Henrietta of the Palatinate; 1652–1730	Charles II; 1661–1700; King of Spain	Maria Anna of Neuburg; 1667–1740	Eleonor Magdalene of Neuburg; 1655–1720	Leopold I 1640–1705; King of Bohemia r. 1657–1705 also Holy Roman Emperor	Margaret Theresa of Spain; 1651–1673	Ferdinand Maria of Bavaria; 1636–1679	Claudia Felicitas of Austria; 1653–1676
Elisabeth Charlotte of Orleans; 1676–1744	Theresa Cunigunda of Poland; 1676–1730	Wilhelmine Amalia of Brunswick-Lüneburg; 1673–1742	Joseph I 1678–1711; King of Bohemia r. 1705–1711 also Holy Roman Emperor	Elisabeth Christine of Brunswick-Wolfenbüttel; 1691–1750	Charles II; 1685–1740; King of Bohemia r. 1711–1740 also Holy Roman Emperor	Maria Antonia of Austria; 1669–1692	Maximilian II Emanuel of Bavaria; 1662–1726	Charles III Philip of the Palatinate]] 1661–1742
LORRAINE
Charles Albert; 1697–1745; Holy Roman Emperor	Maria Amaila of Austria; 1701–1756	Maria Josepha of Austria; 1699–1757	Francis I 1708–1765; Holy Roman Emperor	Maria Theresa; 1717–1780; Queen of Bohemia r. 1740–1741, r. 1743–1780	Elisabeth Auguste Sophie of Neuburg; 1693–1728
Frederick Christian of Saxony; 1722–1763	Maria Antonia of Bavaria; 1724–1780	Charles III; 1716–1788; King of Spain	Maria Amaila of Saxony-Poland; 1724–1760	Maria Josepha of Bavaria; 1739–1767	Joseph II; 1741–1790; King of Bohemia r. 1780–1790 also Holy Roman Emperor	Ferdinand Charles of Austria-Este; 1754–1806	Maria Francisca of Sulzbach; 1724–1794
Maximilian of Saxony; 1759–1838	Charles IV; 1748–1819; King of Spain	Maria Luisa of Spain; 1745–1792	Leopold II; 1747–1792; King of Bohemia r. 1790–1792 also Holy Roman Emperor	Ferdinand I 1751–1825; King of the Two Sicilies	Maria Carolina of Austria; 1752–1814	Caroline of Baden; 1776–1841	Maximilian I Joseph of Bavaria; 1756–1825	Augusta Wilhelmina of Hesse-Darmstadt; 1765–1796
Maria Clementina of Austria; 1777–1801	Francis I 1777–1830; King of the Two Sicilies	María Isabella of Spain; 1789–1848	Charles of Austria-Teschen; 1771–1847	Maria Theresa of Austria-Este; 1773–1832	Maria Theresa of Naples and Sicily; 1772–1807	Francis I 1768–1835; King of Bohemia r. 1792–1835 also King of Hungary and Croatia and Holy Roman Emperor then Emperor of Austria	Caroline Augusta of Bavaria; 1792–1873
Maria Carolina of Bourbon-Two Sicilies; 1798–1870	John of Saxony; 1801–1873	Ferdinand II; 1810–1859; King of the Two Sicilies	Maria Theresa of Austria; 1816–1867	Maria Anna of Sardinia-Piedmont; 1803–1884	Ferdinand V the Good; 1793–1875; King of Bohemia r. 1835–1848 also King of Hungary and Croatia and Emperor of Austria	Francis Charles of Austria; 1802–1878	Sophie of Bavaria; 1805–1872	Ludovika of Bavaria; 1808–1892
Louise Marie Thérèse of Artois; 1819–1864	George of Saxony; 1832–1904	Maria Annunciata of Bourbon-Two Sicilies; 1843–1871	Charles Louis of Austria; 1833–1896	Franz Joseph I 1830–1916; King of Bohemia r. 1848–1916 also King of Hungary and Croatia and Emperor of Austria	Elizabeth in Bavaria; 1837–1898
Robert I of Parma; 1848–1907	Maria Josepha of Saxony; 1867–1944	Otto of Austria; 1865–1906	Francis Ferdinand of Austria; 1863–1914
Zita of Bourbon-Parma; 1892–1989	Charles III; 1887–1922; King of Bohemia r. 1916–1918 also King of Hungary and Croatia and Emperor of Austria in pretence r. 1918–1922
Bohemia became part of the Republic of Czechoslovakia
Otto von Habsburg; 1912–2011; King of Bohemia in pretence r. 1922–2011	Regina of Saxe-Meiningen; 1925–2010
Karl von Habsburg "Charles IV" b. 1961; King of Bohemia in pretence r. 2011–present

== See also ==
- Family tree of German monarchs
