= Battle of Dadosesani Land =

1015 battle of the Polish–German Wars

- Part of Polish–German Wars
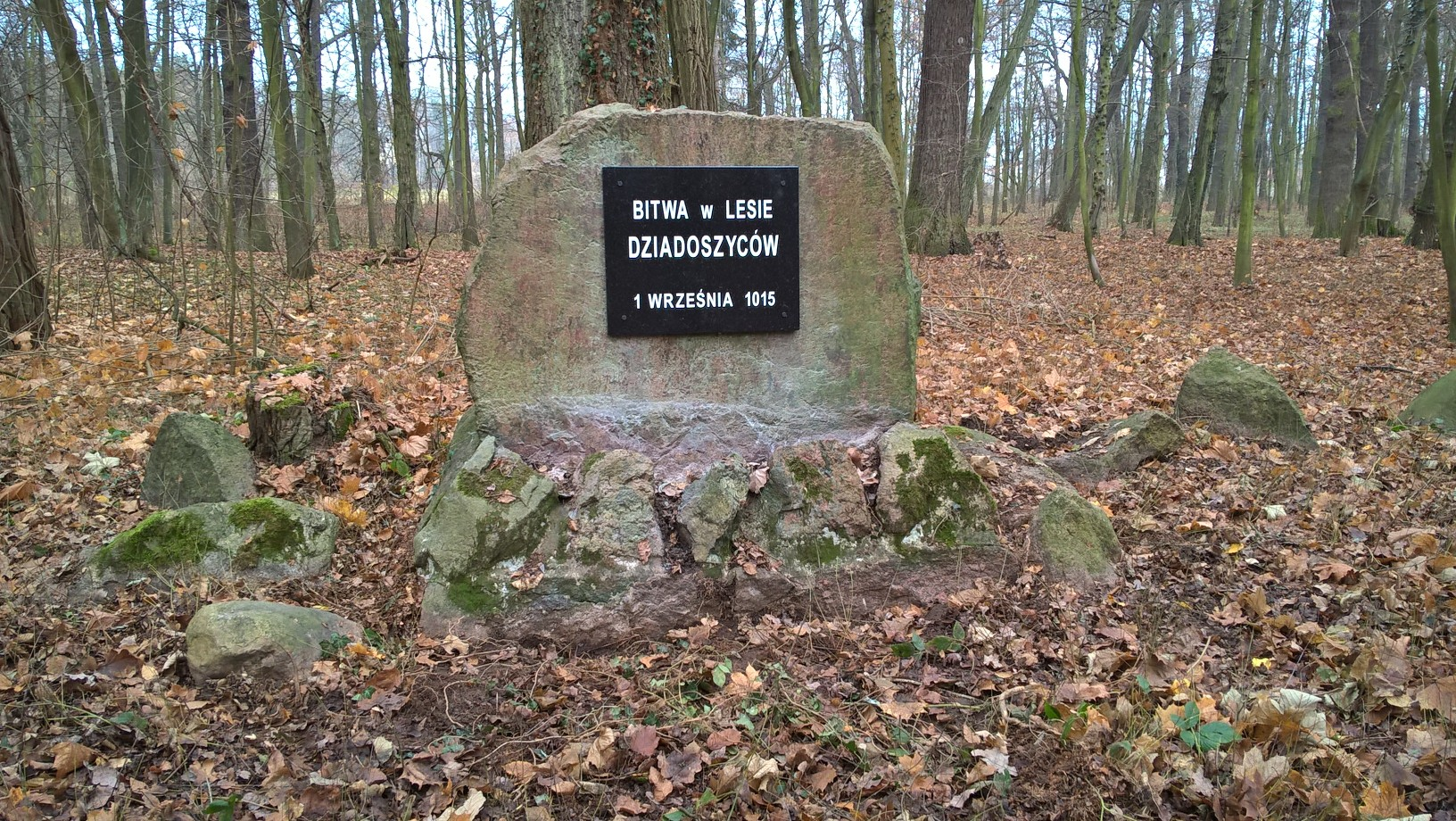
- The monument commemorating the battle in the town of Szprotawa in Lubusz Voivodeship, Poland
Date	1 September 1015
Location	Lower Silesia
Result	Polish victory; Successful retreat of the Holy Roman Empire forces

Belligerents
Duchy of Poland	Holy Roman Empire

Commanders and leaders
Bolesław I the Brave; Mieszko II Lambert	Henry II; Gero Gero II †

Casualties and losses
Unknown	200 soldiers

The Battle of Dadosesani Land (German: Bitwa na ziemi Dziadoszan; German: Schlacht im Land der Dadosanen), also known as the Battle of Dadosesani Forest (Polish: Bitwa w Lesie Dziadoszan, Bitwa w Lesie Dziadoszyców; German: Schlacht von Dadosaner-Wälder) was fought on 1 September 1015 during the Polish–German Wars, between the forces of the Holy Roman Empire, led by emperor Henry II, the margrave of the Saxon Eastern March, against the forces of the Duchy of Poland led by duke Bolesław I the Brave and Mieszko II Lambert. The battle saw Polish forces attack the rearguard units of the Holy Roman Empire, commanded by Gero, the archbishop of Magdeburg, and Gero II, which were tasked with protecting the retreat of the rest of the forces led by emperor Henry II. It ended with the Polish victory and destruction of the rearguard, and the successful reatreated of the rest of the Holy Roman Empire forces. It took place in Lower Silesia, on a swamp on the land of the tribe of the Dadosesani. Its exact location remains unknown, with historians theorising that it most likely took place between towns of Przemków in Lower Silesian Voivodeship and Szprotawa in Lubusz Voivodeship in Poland.

== Background ==
In 1015, during the Polish–German Wars, the Holy Roman Empire forces under the command of the emperor Henry II, broke through the defensive lines of the Duchy of Poland in the Battle of Krosno Odrzańskie. At the same time, the campaign of the Duchy of Bohemia against Poland has been stopped by the Moravians allied with Poland, and the armies the Duchy of Saxony and the Confederacy of the Veleti retreated after pillaging the border regions of Poland. In that situation, the Holy Roman Empire forces become threatened by Polish armies, which led to Henry II ordering his army to retreat back to the Holy Roman Empire.

== Course of the battle ==
While retreating from Poland, the Holy Roman Empire forces set up a camp in Lower Silesia in the lands which belonged to the tribe of the Dadosesani. Threatened with being surrounded by the Polish army, Henry II retreated with the majority of his forces, crossing a swamp on an improvised bridge. A few rearguard units were left in camp under the command of Gero, the archbishop of Magdeburg, and Gero II, the margrave of the Saxon Eastern March. Their units had been surrounded by the Polish forces, led by duke Bolesław I the Brave and Mieszko II Lambert, and destroyed following the series of three attacks on 1 September 1015. 200 soldiers of the Holy Roman Empire forces have been killed, including Gero II. According to some historians, such us Mariusz Samp, the number of Holy Roman Empire casualties have been much more severe. The rest of the Holy Roman Empire forces, led by Henry II, managed to retreat from the battle. They were subsequently chased by the Polish forces, led by Mieszko II Lambert, unsuccessfully besieging the settlement of Meissen on 13 September 1015.

The exact location of the battle remains unknown, with historians theorising that it most likely took place between towns of Przemków in Lower Silesian Voivodeship and Szprotawa in Lubusz Voivodeship in Poland. Other proposed locations include the village of Lubiechów, near the city district of Ochla in Zielona Góra, and the municipality of Gromadka.

== Commemoration ==
In 2019, a monument dedicated to the battle was unveiled in the Slavic Park in the town of Szprotawa in Lubusz Voivodeship, Poland. The town is one of the proposed locations of the battle. It takes a forms of a commemorative plaque installed on a large rock.
