= Emma of Italy =

Queen of Western Francia from 965 to 986

Queen consort of Western Francia
- Tenure: 965–986
- Born: c. 948
- Spouse: Lothair of France (m. 965; died 986)
- Issue: Louis V
- House: Boso
- Father: Lothair II of Italy
- Mother: Adelaide of Italy

Emma of Italy (c. 948 – after 987) was Queen of Western Francia as the wife of King Lothair, whom she married in 965. Their son, Louis V, was the last Carolingian king.

== Life ==
Born around 948, Emma was the only child of Lothair II of Italy and Adelaide of Italy. Her father was poisoned in 950 by his political rival, Berengar of Ivrea. Berengar attempted to marry Emma’s mother, who had a claim to the kingdom, to his own son; she defied him, however, and married the German king Otto I, Holy Roman Emperor instead, by whom she had Otto II.

In 977, Queen Emma was accused by her brother-in-law, Duke Charles of Lower Lorraine, of infidelity with Ascelin, Bishop of Laon. The Queen and Bishop were exonerated by the Synod of Sainte-Macre, led by Adalberon, Archbishop of Rheims, and Charles was forced to flee Western Francia. Emma, to ensure her son’s succession, then persuaded Lothair to crown him as associated king; Lothair did so, but refused to let him have any real power.

Emma’s marriage to Lothair was marked by hostilities between her husband and her half-brother, Otto II, each invading the other’s territories, and attempting to destabilise each other, often through the intermediary of Lothair’s brother, Charles (who as Duke of Lower Lorraine was a vassal of the Emperor). The final years of their marriage, however, from 980 onwards, saw peace between Lothair and his in-laws; when Otto II died, he was even advanced as guardian of the young King.

Lothair died on 2 March 986, and their young son Louis became king. However, he promptly drove Emma and Bishop Ascelin of Laon from the court, accusing them of having poisoned Lothair. Louis then died on 22 May 987, without an heir. In the following months, her brother-in-law Charles seized the royal capital of Laon and declared himself king; Hugh Capet, Duke of the Franks, was elected and crowned king by the agencies of Adalberon on 3 July 987. In the resulting conflicts, Ascelin betrayed Charles to Hugh Capet, as a result of which the last Carolingian was imprisoned in Orleans.

Emma's doings following the death of her son are unclear; she is believed to have died in a Burgundian convent or married Duke Boleslaus II (being identical to Emma of Mělník) and possibly had a son called Oldřich.

== Hypothetical second union in Bohemia ==
According to some historians, she may have been Emma of Mělník, who married Boleslaus II about the year 989 and died either in 1005 or 1006. It was traditionally supposed by Czech historians that Emma was the mother of Boleslaus' younger sons Oldřich and Jaromír and that the mother of the oldest son, Boleslaus III of Bohemia, was Adiva, the first wife of Boleslaus II.

After death of her second husband and afraid of Boleslaus III, Emma chose to go into exile at the court of Bavaria (as she was stepsister of former Emperor Otto II) in 1001 together with her stepsons Oldřich and Jaromír. The brothers sought military backing from the German King Henry II. This action definitively placed Bohemia within the jurisdiction of the Holy Roman Empire.

In 1004, Jaromír occupied Prague with a German army and made himself duke. Emma came back to Bohemia, maybe living in town Mělník, where she died.

Evidence of a Bohemian marriage are Bohemian denars with the inscription EMMA REGINA ("Queen Emma", not Duchess), while denars of her husband Boleslaus II from the same period are inscribed BOLESLAVS DUX ("Duke Boleslaus"). In that time Bohemia was a Duchy of Bohemia, not yet a Kingdom of Bohemia, but she was still an anointed queen of Western Francia. Through her the following Dukes of Bohemia became also offspring of Carolingian.

This second wedding is not accepted by the majority of historians.

== Sources ==
- Duckett, Eleanor Shipley (1988). Death and Life in the Tenth Century. University of Michigan Press. ISBN 9780472061723.

Royal titles
Preceded by Gerberga of Saxony	Queen consort of Western Francia; 965–986; Served alongside: Adelaide-Blanche of Anjou (982–984)	Succeeded by Adelaide of Aquitaine
