= Jaromír, Bishop of Prague =

Eleventh-century Czech bishop

Jaromír (after 1035 – 26 June 1090) was the Bishop of Prague from 1068, when he was appointed by his brother, Vratislaus II of Bohemia. The two were both sons of Duke Bretislaus I of Bohemia.

== Life ==
In 1063, Vratislaus established a diocese at Olomouc and raised John, a monk of Břevnov, to the see. Jaromír was resentful of the loss of tithes and fiefs and the brothers entered into a long rivalry. Jaromír even attacked the new bishop of Olomouc and carried off by force of arms the relics which had been removed from Prague to the new see. Vratislaus, for his part, spited his brother by wearing his episcopal vestments—an honour conferred by the pope for the price of 100 marks per annum—in his brother's presence at official functions.

Pope Alexander II sent the legate Rudolph to hold a diet in Prague in response to the conflicts surrounding the new see. Jaromír did not attend and was deposed. Gregory VII summoned the bishops to Rome. At an Easter synod in 1074, Jaromír confessed his ill-treatment of John, but refused to yield Podvin. Gregory ordered that Vratislaus should remove his brother by force if necessary.

Jaromír was an ally of Holy Roman Emperor Henry IV during the Investiture Controversy. Jaromír was appointed chancellor by Henry and took the name Gebhard in 1077. In 1085, John died, and a Reichstag convened in Mainz to suppress the Moravian see, re-uniting it to Prague by Jaromír's insistence. Vratislaus fell out with Henry over the loss of Meissen and raised his chaplain Wecel to Olomouc as Bishop Andrew I. Jaromír went to Rome to protest to Pope Urban II. He was preparing to fight Wecel at Esztergom when he died.

== Ancestry ==
Ancestors of Jaromír, Bishop of Prague

16. Boleslaus I of Bohemia
8. Boleslaus II of Bohemia
17. Biagota (?)
4. Oldřich of Bohemia
9. Emma of Mělník
2. Bretislaus I of Bohemia
10. Křesina
5. Božena
1. Jaromír, Bishop of Prague
12. Berthold
6. Henry of Schweinfurt
13. Eilika of Walbeck
3. Judith of Schweinfurt
14. Otto II of Henneberg
7. Gerberga of Henneberg
