= Battle of Krosno Odrzańskie =

Battle between Poland and the Holy Roman Empire

- Part of German–Polish War
| Date | August 1015 |
| Location | Krosno Odrzańskie, Duchy of Poland |
| Result | German victory |

Belligerents
| Duchy of Poland | Holy Roman Empire |

Commanders and leaders
| Mieszko II Lambert | Henry II |

The Battle of Krosno Odrzańskie (Note: Polish: Bitwa pod Krosnem Odrzańskim) was fought in August of 1015 during the German–Polish War, between the army of the Duchy of Poland led by Bolesław I the Brave, against the army of the Holy Roman Empire led by Henry II. It was fought in Krosno Odrzańskie, Poland. It ended on 3 August with German victory, as their forces managed to break through the defensive positions of Poland.

== The battle ==
The battle was fought in August of 1015, during the German–Polish War, between the army of the Duchy of Poland led by Bolesław I the Brave, against the army of the Holy Roman Empire led by Henry II. It was fought in Krosno Odrzańskie, with German forces attacking the Polish army that defended the crossing of the Oder river. On 3 August, German forces broke through the Polish defensive lines, winning the battle.

== Aftermath ==
Despite winning the battle, the German army did not gain a significant strategic victory. Soon after the battle, the campaign of the Duchy of Bohemia against Poland, that was supposed to aid German forces, has been stopped by Moravians allied with Poland. Additionally, the allied of armies the Duchy of Saxony and Confederacy of the Veleti had retreated after pillaging the border regions of Poland. In that situation, German forces become threatened by Polish armies, which made Henry II order his army to retreat back to the Holy Roman Empire. While in retreat, they were caught by Polish forces, which lead to them losing in the Battle of Dadosesani Land.

== Bibliography ==
- K. Olejnik, Cedynia, Niemcza, Głogów, Krzyszków. Kraków: Wydawnictwo KAW, 1988, ISBN 83-03-02038-2.
- Jerzy Wyrozumski, Dzieje Polski piastowskiej (VIII w.-1370), 1999, ISBN 83-85719-38-5.
