= Boleslaus the Pious =

There were two rulers named tin Latin as Boleslaus the Pious:

- Boleslaus II, Duke of Bohemia (Czech: Boleslav II. Pobožný) (c. 932–999), Bohemian nobleman, member of the Přemyslid dynasty and the ruling Duke of Bohemia from 972 until his death.
- Bolesław the Pious (Polish: Bolesław Pobożny) (1224/27–1279), Duke of Greater Poland during 1239–1247
