= Boleslaus III =

Boleslaus III may refer to:

- Boleslaus III of Bohemia (c. 965–1037), Duke of Bohemia
- Boleslaus III the Wrymouth (1086–1138), Duke of Poland
