= Emma of Mělník =

Bohemian consort

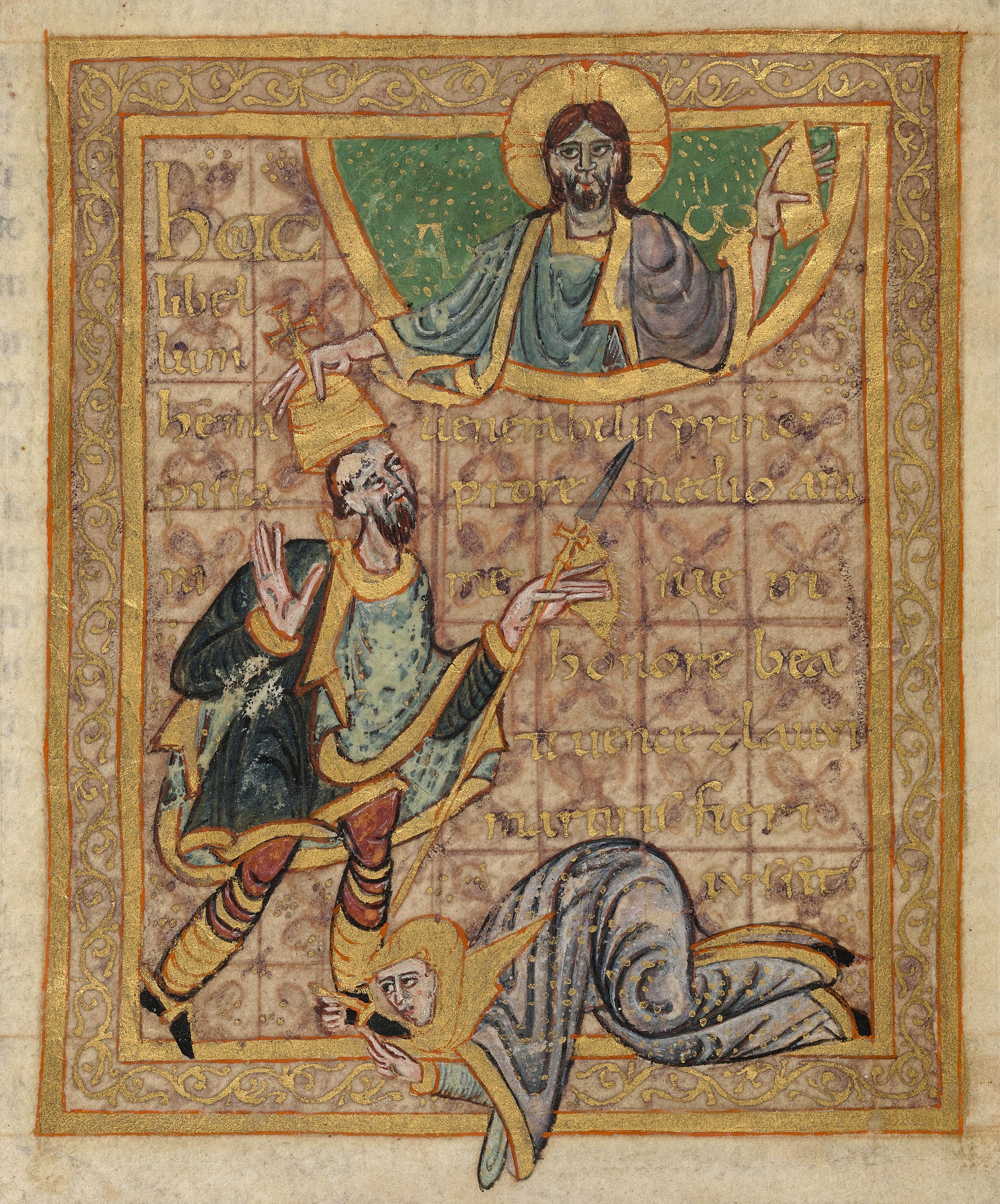
- Emma and Saint Wenceslaus
- Born: before 950
- Died: 1005 or 1006; Mělník, Bohemia
- Spouse: Boleslaus II of Bohemia
- Issue: Jaromír (possibly); Oldřich

Emma (Hemma) (bef. 950 – 1005/06) was a Bohemian duchess consort as the second wife of Boleslaus II of Bohemia.

Her origins are uncertain. Historian Gelasius Dobner (1719–90) thought she was a princess of Burgundy, and this theory has been recently respected. The latest research of historians and numismatists, however, indicate that she was of Italian-Burgundian origin and have identified her with Emma of Italy, widow of King Lothair of France (d. 986). She became the second wife of Boleslaus II about the year 989 and died either in 1005 or 1006. It was traditionally supposed by Czech historians that Emma was the mother of Boleslaus' younger sons Oldřich and Jaromír and that the mother of the oldest son, Boleslaus III of Bohemia, was Adiva, the first wife of Boleslaus II.

After her husband's death in 999 AD, Emma struck coins bearing her own name, labelling herself a queen. However, Boleslaus III soon took the throne.

Afraid of Boleslaus III, Emma chose to go into exile at the court of Bavaria in 1001 together with her sons the Dukes of Bohemia Oldřich and Jaromir. The brothers sought military backing from the German King Henry II, definitively placing Bohemia within the jurisdiction of the Holy Roman Empire.

In 1004, Jaromír occupied Prague with a German army and made himself duke. Emma came back to Bohemia, likely living in the town of Mělník, where she died.

Evidencing her existence are Bohemian denar coins with the inscription EMMA REGINA ("Queen Emma", not Duchess).

Emma of Mělník Born: before 950 Died: 1005 or 1006
Royal titles
Preceded by Biagota?	Duchess consort of Bohemia c.989–999	Succeeded by Božena (Křesinova)? Next confirmed: Judith of Schweinfurt
