= Strachkvas =

10th-century Bohemian prince and clergyman

Strachkvas Kristián (28 September 929 or 935 – 996) was a prince of Bohemia, son of Boleslav I and brother of Boleslav II, all members of the Přemyslid dynasty. A clergyman, Strachkvas was finally to become Bishop of Prague but died during his consecration.

== Life ==
While it is known that he was the son of Boleslav I the identity of his mother is not known for certain but one candidate is Biagota, the presumed wife of Boleslav.

Strachkvas was born on a feast day on which his father killed his own brother, Wenceslaus, in order to replace Wenceslaus as Duke of the Bohemians. Feeling remorse, Boleslav gave his newborn son the strange name of "Strachkvas", "a dreadful feast". Boleslav promised to devote his son to religion and to educate him as a clergyman, and he kept his word. Strachkvas was sent to Saint Emmeram's Abbey in Regensburg.

According to Chronica Boemorum of Cosmas of Prague, Saint Adalbert of Prague in 994 offered his episcopal see to Strachkvas, explaining that Strachkvas came from the Přemyslids, and it would be easy for him to bend people to his will; but Strachkvas refused the episcopacy. When Adalbert's family was massacred the next year and he left Prague, however, Strachkvas was appointed to succeed him. Then, just as Strachkvas was about to assume the episcopate, he died without warning during the installation ceremony itself. The circumstances of his death still are unclear.

Another version has Strachkvas "possessed and destroyed by demons".
