= Ochla, Zielona Góra =

Ochla
- District of Zielona Góra
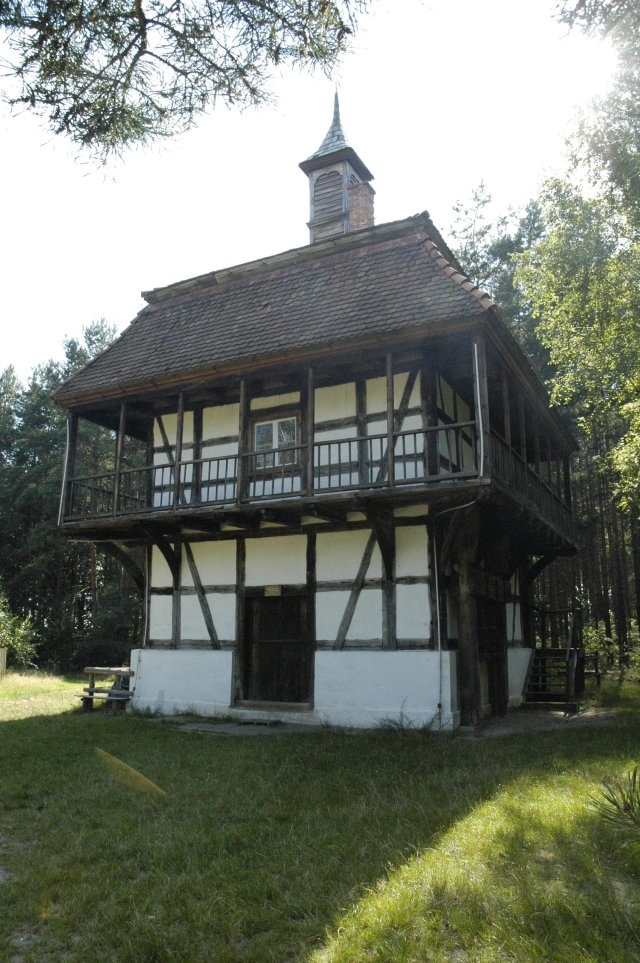
- Vinemaker house in heritage park

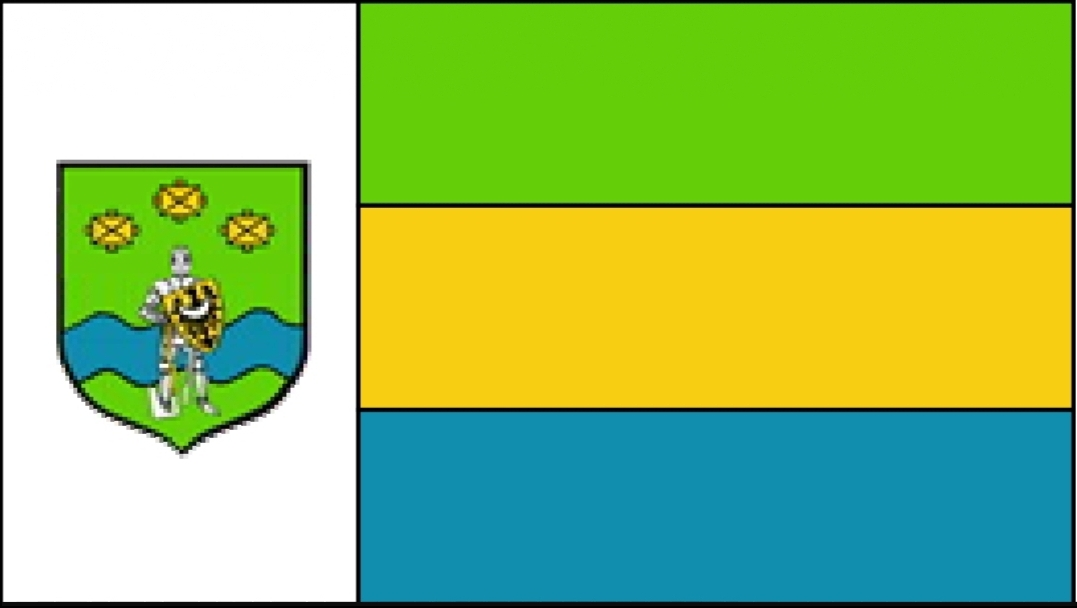
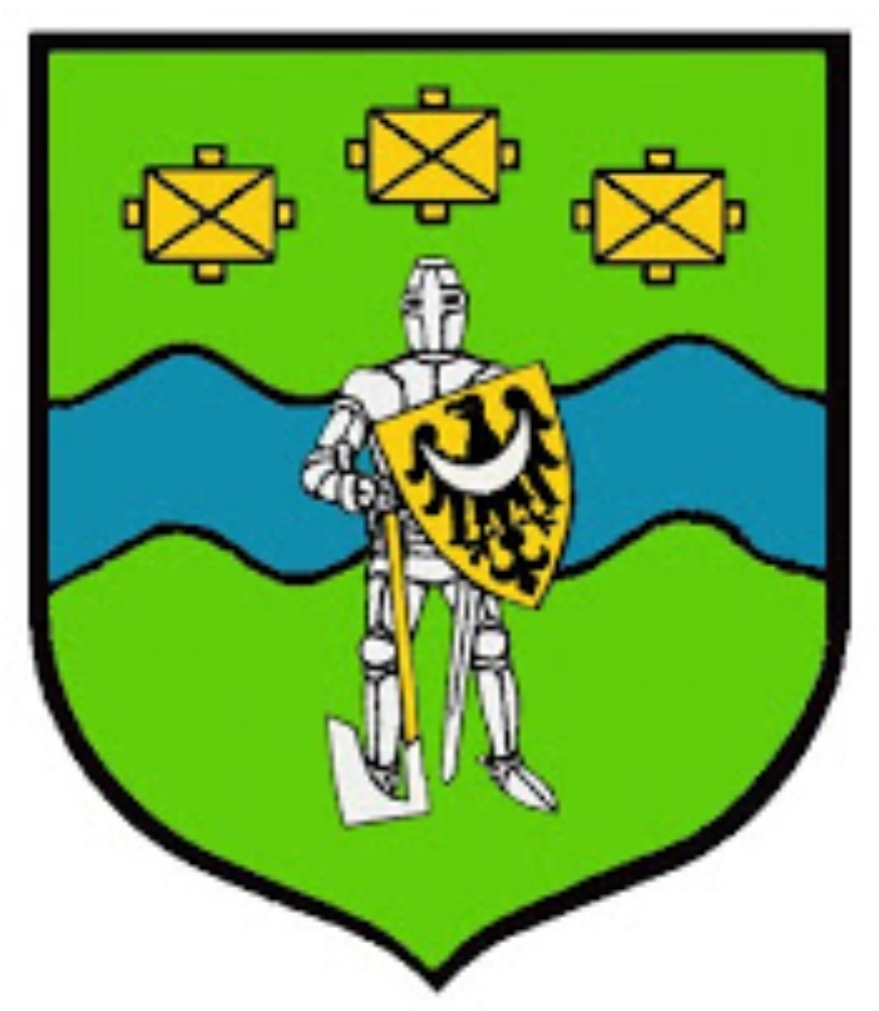
- Flag Coat of arms

- Location within Poland Location within Lubusz Voivodeship
- Coordinates: 51°52′30″N 15°28′0″E
- Country: Poland
- Voivodeship: Lubusz
- County/City: Zielona Góra

Population
  - Total: 1,544
- Time zone: UTC+1 (CET)
  - Summer (DST): UTC+2 (CEST)
- Postal code: 66-006
- Area code: +48 68
- Vehicle registration: FZ

Ochla [ˈɔxla] is a district in the southern part of the city of Zielona Góra in western Poland. It was a separate village until 2014.

Ochla has a population of 1,544.

== Sport ==
Ochla is home to a football club: LKS Zorza Ochla.
