= Siege of Meissen =

1015 battle part of the German–Polish War (1003–1018)

- Part of the Polish–German Wars (1003–1018)
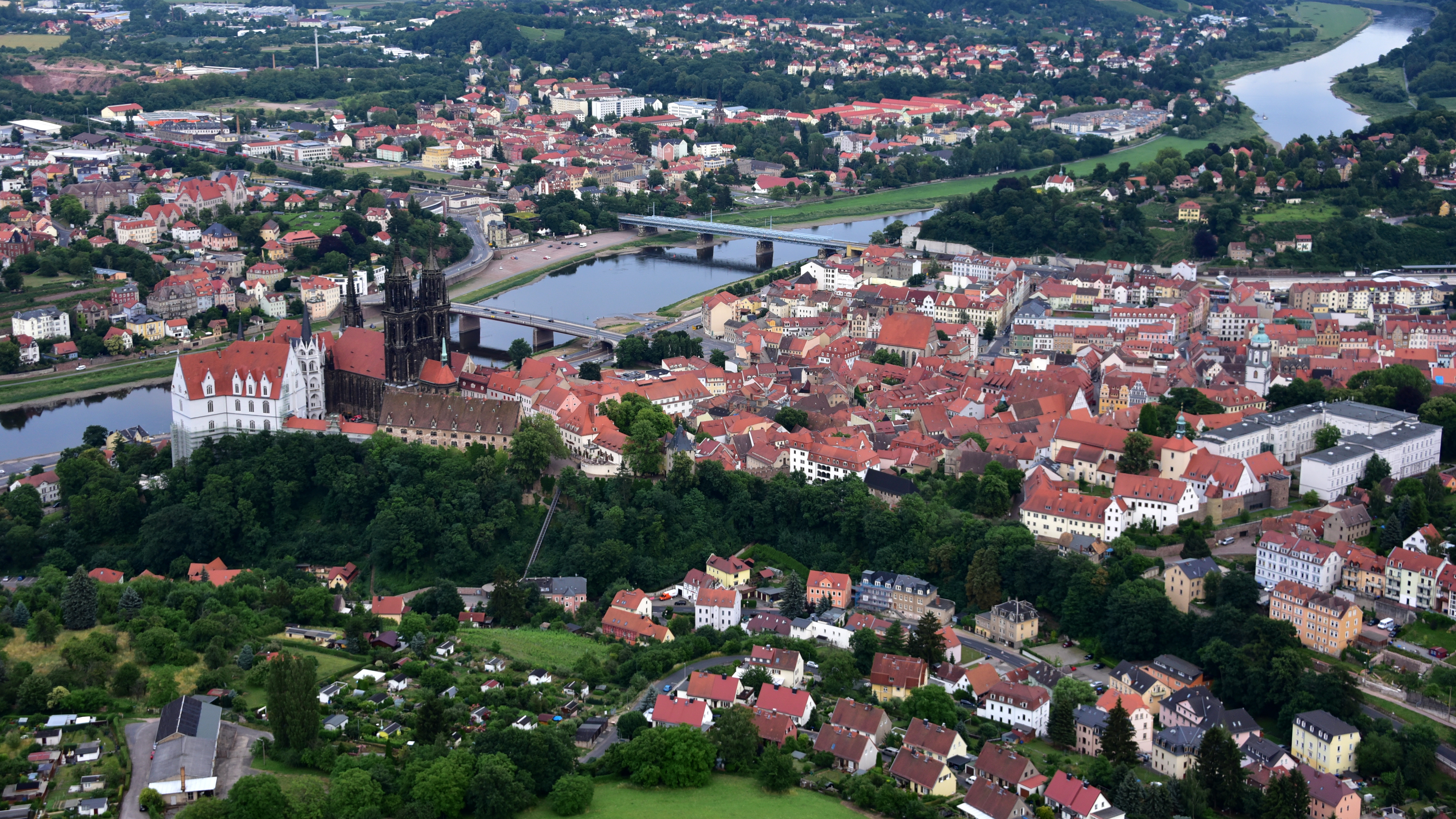
- Modern–day Meissen
Date	13 September 1015
Location	Meissen, modern–day Germany
Result	German victory

Belligerents
Duchy of Poland	Holy Roman Empire

Commanders and leaders
Mieszko II	Hermann

The siege of Meissen was a siege part of the German–Polish War that took place on 13 September 1015. It was fought between the Duchy of Poland led by Mieszko II Lambert against the Holy Roman Empire led by Hermann. It ended with a German victory.

== Prelude ==
A battle was fought between the Poles and the Germans on the 1st of September 1015, having ended with a Polish victory.

Bolesław I the Brave had sent his entire army to follow behind the fleeing Henry II, and made Mieszko II the commander of the operation.

He then crossed the Elbe and began the siege of Meissen.

== Battle ==
The German king (Henry II), having reached Meissen, ordered Hermann to defend the town against the Poles, while he himself went to Merseburg.

Bolesław's son, Mieszko II began the siege and the plundering of the area. Many German defenders surrendered the stronghold at the very beginning and fought in the upper part of the stronghold. Mieszko II decided to abandon the siege due to many things, including the rising level of the Elbe whose constantly expanding floodplain could cut off the return route.

The siege didn't take very long, ending with a German victory.

== Aftermath ==
Hostilities did not end after this, continuing on until 1018. It eventually ended with the Peace of Bautzen, marking the war as a Polish victory with them gaining Lusatia and Upper Lusatia.

== See also ==
- List of wars involving Poland
- List of wars involving Germany

== Bibliography ==
- Paweł Rochała: Niemcza 1017 (Series: Historical Battles), ISBN 9788311122352. 2012.
- Timothy Reuter: The new Cambridge medieval history: 3: C. 900 - c. 1024 (5 print ed). Cambridge: Cambridge University, 2014.
