= Gero II of the Saxon Ostmark =

Margrave of the Saxon Ostmark

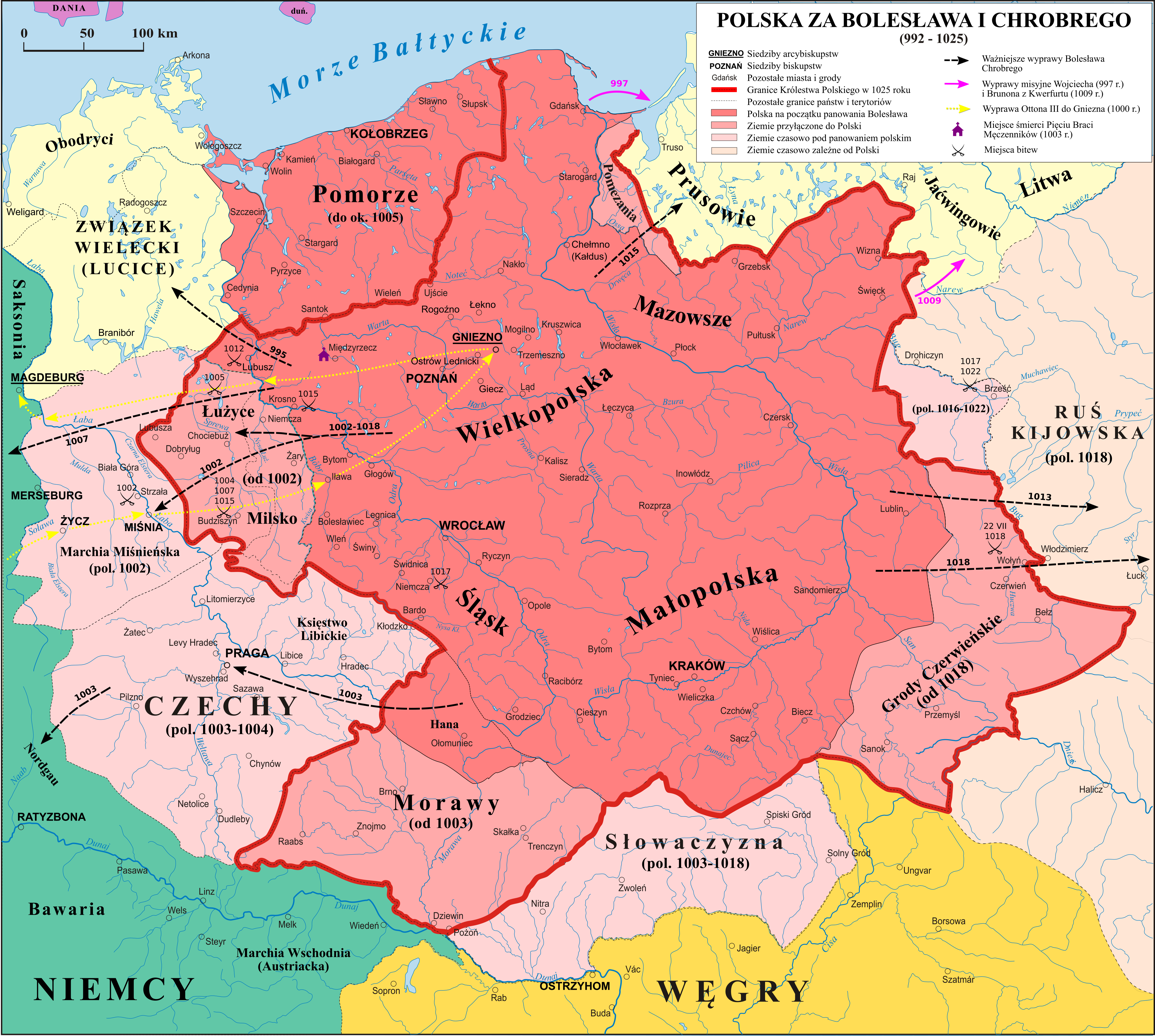
German-Polish conflicts over the territories of Gero II and other neighboring regions at the beginning of the 11th century

Gero II (c. 975 – 1 September 1015) was a prominent German noble from Saxony, who held high offices in southeastern Saxon and neighboring Slavic regions, first as count, and then as margrave. He was the eldest son of Thietmar, Margrave of Meissen, and Schwanehilde (Suanhild), daughter of Herman, Duke of Saxony. He was therefore probably a grandson of Hidda and Christian of Thuringia and named for his great-uncle Gero the Great. In 992, he was created Count of Hassegau in southeastern Eastphalia, and already in 993 succeeded his probable uncle Odo I, as margrave over a frontier region (march) on the middle Elbe, known in historiography as the Saxon Eastern March, that stretched into Lusatia.

During the spring of 1002, his march, that was mentioned in the Chronicle of Thietmar of Merseburg (d. before 1018) as the count Gero’s march (Latin: Geronis marcham comitis; German: Mark des Grafen Gero), was temporarily overrun by the Polish duke Bolesław I the Brave, who seized all lands up to the river Elbe, capturing Bautzen (Upper Sorbian: Budyšin) and also the neighboring Meissen (Upper Sorbian: Mišno) with all territories up to White Elster river.

Gero then went to Merseburg, to meet with the new king Henry II in the summer of the same year (1002), but the question of possession over Lusatia remained contested for several years, since German-Polish relations were marked by a series of consecutive conflicts and temporary treaties. By 1009, Germans succeeded in recapturing several regions, including Belgern, that belonged under Gero's jurisdiction.

In 1015, Gero participated in the renewed German-Polish war, waged throughout Lusatia and Silesia. He was killed in battle with a Polish army of Boleslaw I. His body was recovered by Eido I, Bishop of Meissen. Gero was buried in his family's monastery of Nienburg. He was survived by his wife Adelaide (Athelheidhe) and one son, Thietmar, who succeeded him.

== See also ==
- Polabian Slavs
- Sorbs (tribe)

== Sources ==
- Bachrach, David S. (2020). "The Eastern Campaigns of King Henry II of Germany, 1003–17". Journal of Medieval Military History. 18: 1–36.
- Meckelnborg, Christina; Riecke, Anne-Beate (2011). Georg Spalatins Chronik der Sachsen und Thüringer: Ein historiographisches Großprojekt der Frühen Neuzeit. Köln: Böhlau Verlag.
- Stieldorf, Andrea (2026) [2012]. Marken und Markgrafen: Studien zur Grenzsicherung durch die fränkisch-deutschen Herrscher (2nd ed.). Wiesbaden: Harrassowitz Verlag.
- Trillmich, Werner, ed. (1957). Thietmar von Merseburg: Chronik. Darmstadt: Wissenschaftliche Buchgesellschaf.
- Warner, David A., ed. (2001). Ottonian Germany: The Chronicon of Thietmar of Merseburg. Manchester and New York: Manchester University Press.
- Wolfram, Herwig (2010). Conrad II 990-1039: Emperor of Three Kingdoms. University Park: Pennsylvania State University Press.

Preceded by Odo I	Margrave of the Ostmark; 993–1015	Succeeded by Thietmar
