= Biagota =

Purported Bohemian queen

Biagota (born c. 920) was probably the wife of duke Boleslaus I of Bohemia, a member of the Přemyslid dynasty.

Michal Lutovský writes in his book Bratrovrah a tvůrce státu (Fratricide and country-maker) that only a few coins confirm the existence of Biagota.

These coins are considered the oldest type of Přemyslid denar. An inscription can be read on them, BIAGOTACOIIIIX or BIAGOTACOVIIX, meaning BIAGOTA CONIVNX: wife Biagota. Possibly these coins were made on the occasion of marriage, but there is no proof for it.

It is not certain that Biagota was the mother of all four adult children of Boleslaus I (Dobrawa, Boleslaus II of Bohemia, Strachkvas, and Mlada of Bohemia). Her origins are unclear. She could have originated from one of the German states of the Holy Roman Empire or from a Slavic country (Blahota or Bjegota was an old Bulgarian name). Both hypotheses could be right, corresponding to the contemporary practice of European rulers.

== Literature ==
- Petráň, Z. První české mince. Prague, 1998.
- Lutovský, M. Bratrovrah a tvůrce státu : život a doba knížete Boleslava I. 1. vyd. Prague: Set out, 1998. 162 pp.

Royal titles
Preceded by Drahomíra	Duchess consort of Bohemia; 935-972	Succeeded by Emma of Melnik
