= Vladivoj, Duke of Bohemia =

Duke of Bohemia from 1002 to 1003

Vladivoj

Duke of Bohemia
- Reign: May 1002 – January 1003
- Predecessor: Boleslaus III
- Successor: Bolesław the Brave
- Born: c. 981
- Died: January 1003 (aged c. 22)
- Spouse: not known
- Issue: not known
- Dynasty: Piast
- Father: Mieszko I of Poland (possibly)
- Mother: Doubravka (possibly)

Vladivoj (c. 981 – January 1003) was Duke of Bohemia from 1002 until his death.

== Life ==
Valdivoy's family is unknown; he is speculated by some historians to be a son of Mieszko I and Doubravka of Bohemia, based on a statement of Thietmar of Merseburg that he came to Bohemia from Poland and he was somehow 'related' to Bohemian royal family.

When Duke Boleslaus III was dethroned during a revolt by the Czech Vršovci clan, the Bohemian nobles declared Vladivoj, the Duke in 1002. The Czech historian Dušan Třeštík writes that Vladivoj assumed the Bohemian throne with the support of the Polish duke Bolesław I the Brave. In November, he also obtained the support by the German king Henry II who enfeoffed him with the Bohemian duchy.

After Vladivoj died in 1003, Bolesław the Brave invaded Bohemia and restored Boleslaus III who had many Bohemian noblemen murdered. It is said that Vladivoj was an alcoholic, and drinking was a possible contributor to his death. A massacre of the Vršovci clan at Vyšehrad ordered by Boleslaus III led to his deposition and the succession of his younger brother Jaromír.

== Bibliography ==
- Berend, Nora; Urbańczyk, Przemysław; Wiszewski, Przemysław (2013). Central Europe in the High Middle Ages: Bohemia, Hungary and Poland, c. 900-c. 1300. Cambridge University Press. ISBN 978-0-521-78156-5.
- Manteuffel, Tadeusz (1982). The Formation of the Polish State: The Period of Ducal Rule, 963–1194 (Translated and with an Introduction by Andrew Gorski). Wayne State University Press. ISBN 0-8143-1682-4.
- Třeštík, Dušan (2011). "Great Moravia and the beginnings of the state (9th and 10th centuries)". In Pánek, Jaroslav; Tůma, Oldřich (eds.). A History of the Czech Lands. Charles University in Prague. pp. 65–79. ISBN 978-80-246-1645-2.

Vladivoj, Duke of Bohemia Přemyslid dynasty (?) Born: c. 981 Died: 1003
Preceded by Boleslaus III	Duke of Bohemia; 1002–1003	Succeeded by Bolesław the Brave
