= Mlada (abbess) =

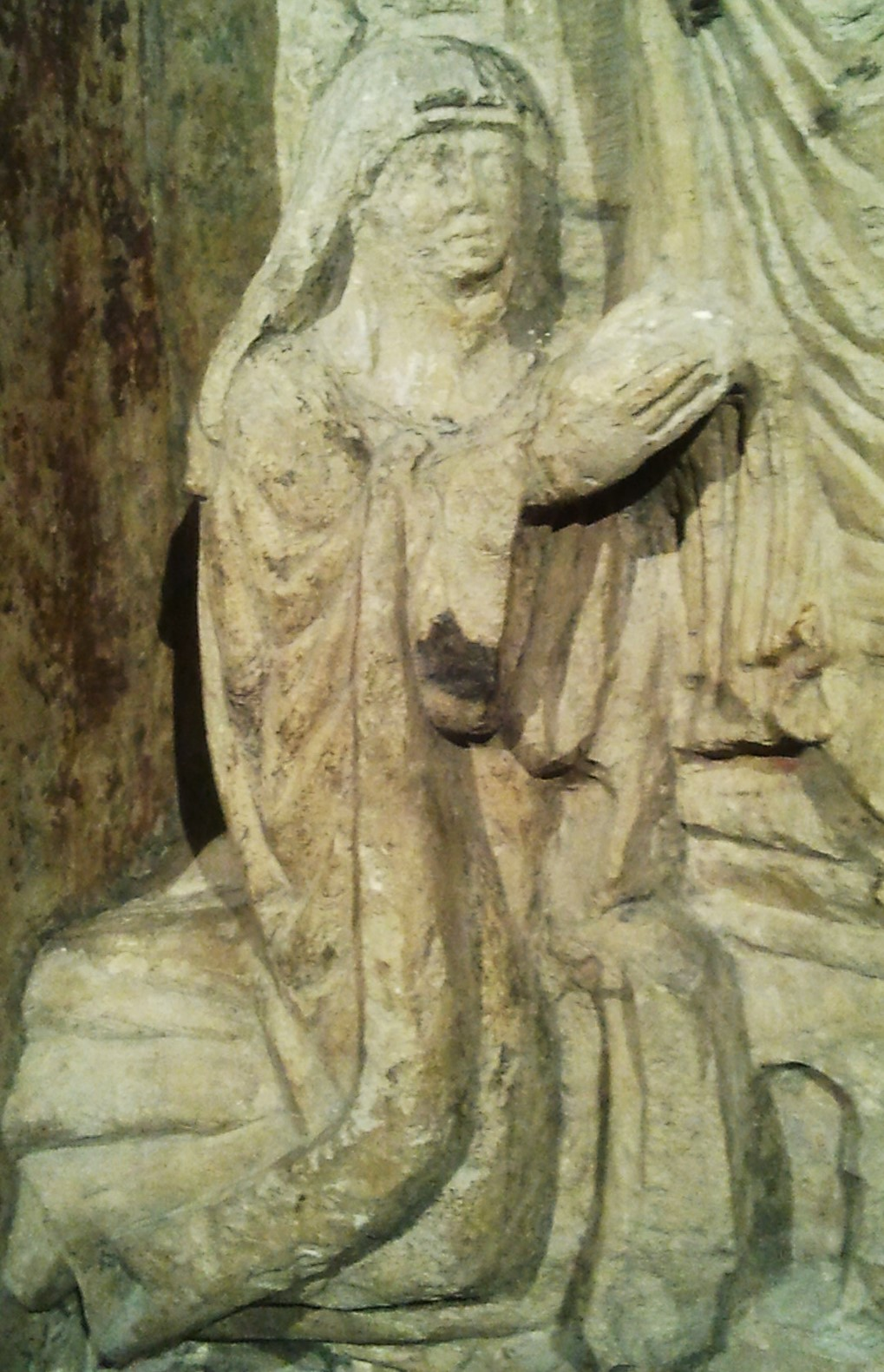
Mlada from the tympanum of St. George Monastery (1220s)

Mlada was a Benedictine abbess and founder of the first monastery in Bohemia. In 965, she undertook a diplomatic trip to Rome to advocate the formation of the Diocese of Prague.

== Life ==
Mlada was the youngest daughter of the Bohemian prince Boleslav I. The 12th-century Chronica Boemorum by Cosmas of Prague describes her as an educated woman; she studied Latin and was destined for a clerical career. In the years 965 to 969, she was sent by her father to Rome to meet with Pope John XIII and request permission for the establishment of a separate diocese for Bohemia and Moravia. The negotiations were difficult. Bohemia was part of the Diocese of Regensburg and Bishop Michael refused to forego the revenue from Czech churches during his lifetime (he died on 23 September 972). The approval for the breakup of the diocese was only granted by his successor, Wolfgang of Regensburg. Mlada left Rome in the winter of 972 and returned to Prague. The ecclesiastical permission was followed by secular negotiations. After the meeting of the Reichstag in Quedlinburg in March 973, approval for the foundation of the diocese was secured, but it took until 976 for Dětmar to be ordained as the first Bishop of Prague.

Another result of Mlada's diplomatic mission was permission to found a monastery in Prague. During her stay in Rome, she entered the Order of Saint Benedict, adopted the religious name Maria, and was ordained as abbess. Thus she was able to lead the newly formed St. George's Convent at Prague Castle, the very first congregation in Bohemia. She held this office until her death.

Contemporary sources report neither the birth date nor the death date of Mlada. The oft-cited claim that she died on 9 February 994 can be traced to the Jesuit Georgio Crugerio and dates from 1669, based on the oral tradition of the monastery. The Benedictines of the Monastery of St. George have not been able to secure an official status as "Saint" or "Blessed" for their founder, who is therefore referred to as "Venerable". Her grave is reportedly located in the Mary Chapel of the former Monastery of Saint George, but archaeological investigations have been unable to establish beyond reasonable doubt that the person buried there is indeed Abbess Mlada.

== Bibliography ==
- Cosmas of Prague, Chronica Boemorum. Edition by Berthold Bretholz, Berlin 1923, MGH SS Rer. Germ. N. S.
- Jiří Sláma. "Výkladový heslář vybraných historických osob, míst a reálií". In: Rostislav Nový, Jiří Sláma, Jana Zachová: Slavníkovci ve středověkém písemnictví. Prague, Vyšehrad 1987.
- Petr Sommer. "Kaple Panny Marie v klášteře sv. Jiří na Pražském hradě a začátky české sakrální architektury". In: Přemyslovský stát kolem roku 1000: na pamět knížete Boleslava II (7. února 999). Prague, Nakl. Lidové Noviny, 2000. ISBN 80-7106-272-3.
