= Jaromír, Duke of Bohemia =

Duke of Bohemia (??–1038)

Jaromír
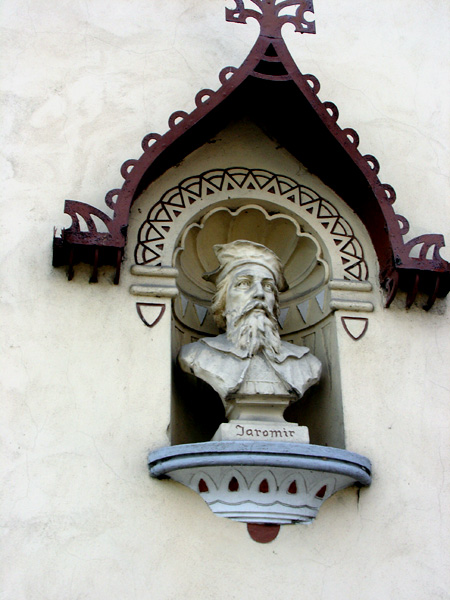

Duke of Bohemia
- Reign: 1003
- Predecessor: Boleslaus III
- Successor: Boleslaus IV

Duke of Bohemia
- Reign: 1004 – 1012
- Predecessor: Boleslaus IV
- Successor: Oldřich

Duke of Bohemia
- Reign: 1033 – 1034
- Predecessor: Oldřich
- Successor: Oldřich
- Born: c. 970
- Died: 4 November 1038 (aged c. 60–70); Lysá nad Labem
- Spouse: not known
- Issue: not known
- Dynasty: Přemyslid
- Father: Boleslaus II, Duke of Bohemia
- Mother: Adiva or Emma of Mělník

Jaromír (died 4 November 1038), a member of the Přemyslid dynasty, was Duke of Bohemia in 1003, from 1004 to 1012, and again from 1034 to 1035.

== Early life ==
He was the second son of Duke Boleslaus II the Pious (d. 999). His mother may have been either one of his father's two wives: Adiva or Emma of Mělník.

In 1002, Jaromír rebelled against the rule of his elder brother Boleslaus III, who had him castrated and expelled with his mother and his brother Oldřich to the Bavarian court at Regensburg. Nevertheless, Boleslaus was unable to secure the Prague throne, as he was deposed by the Bohemian nobility and his rule was taken over by his Piast cousin Vladivoj, backed by the Polish duke Bolesław I the Brave. Vladivoj also secured the support of King Henry II of Germany when he received the Duchy of Bohemia as a royal fief.

== Reign ==
When Vladivoj died the next year, Jaromír and Oldřich returned to Bohemia and Jaromír was proclaimed duke by the Bohemian nobles. The Bohemian lands were occupied in turn by the Polish forces of Bolesław, who reinstated Boleslaus III as duke. After he ordered a massacre of the rival Vršovci clan, however, he lost the support of the Polish ruler and was finally deprived of power. Meanwhile, Jaromír had sought military backing from King Henry II. At Merseburg, he promised to hold Bohemia as a vassal of the king. This action definitively placed Bohemia within the jurisdiction of the Holy Roman Empire.

In 1004, Jaromír occupied Prague with a German army and proclaimed himself Bohemian duke. Nevertheless, the state he regained was a small one, as Polish forces still held Moravia, Silesia, and Lusatia. Jaromír's reign—like so many of the other early Czech rulers—was a struggle to regain lost lands. He remained a loyal supporter of King Henry in the smouldering German–Polish War. Nonetheless, the German king took no action when, in 1012, Jaromír was dethroned by Oldřich (who had him blinded) and forced once again into exile. In a surprise campaign, Jaromír once again managed to depose Oldřich with the support of Emperor Conrad II in 1033, but his second reign was short-lived. A year later, Oldřich was restored by his son Bretislaus I.

Jaromír was imprisoned at Lysá nad Labem and died on 4 November 1035 or 1038, (Note: Cosmas gives 1038) a year after the death of his brother. He was assassinated by one of the Vršovci clan. According to the Chronica Boemorum, "Kochan sent his executioner, and when the blind man was sitting on the toilet at night, emptying his stomach, he pierced him with a sharp spear from behind to the bowels of the abdomen".

== Notes ==
Jaromír, Duke of Bohemia Přemyslid dynasty Born: c. 975 Died: 11 November 1034
Regnal titles
Preceded by Vladivoj	Duke of Bohemia; 1003	Succeeded by Boleslaus III
Preceded by Boleslaus IV	Duke of Bohemia; 1004–1012	Succeeded by Oldřich
Preceded by Oldřich	Duke of Bohemia; 1033-1034	Succeeded by Oldřich
