= Boleslaus III of Bohemia =

Duke of Bohemia (fl. 999–1003)

Boleslaus III the Red
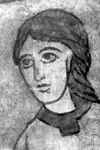
- Fresco in the Znojmo Rotunda, 12th-century

Duke of Bohemia
- Reign: February 999 – May 1002
- Predecessor: Boleslaus II
- Successor: Vladivoj

Duke of Bohemia
- Reign: February – March 1003
- Predecessor: Vladivoj
- Successor: Bolesław I the Brave
- Born: c. 965
- Died: 1037 (aged 72-71); Poland
- Spouse: not known
- Issue: not known
- Dynasty: Přemyslid
- Father: Boleslaus II, Duke of Bohemia
- Mother: Adiva

Boleslaus III (c. 965 – 1037), called the Red (Czech: Boleslav III. Ryšavý; to denote a "red-haired" individual) or the Blind, a member of the Přemyslid dynasty, was Duke of Bohemia from 999 until 1002 and briefly again during the year 1003. During his chaotic reign, Bohemia became a pawn in the long German–Polish War between King Henry II and Duke Bolesław I, "the Brave", of Poland.

== Life ==
The eldest son of Duke Boleslaus II "the Pious", probably with his first wife Adiva, he succeeded to the Bohemian throne upon the death of his father in 999. Boleslaus III turned out to be a weak ruler and soon entered into a fierce inheritance conflict with his younger brothers Jaromír and Oldřich. He had both expelled to the Bavarian court of Henry II in Regensburg, together with their mother Dowager Duchess Emma.

By 1002, a revolt organized by nobles of the rival Vršovci clan (along with Boleslaus's son-in-law) forced him to flee to Germany, where he was received by Margrave Henry I of Austria. At first, Henry I ordered the arrest of his guest because of an old offence, but soon forgave him and promised support. Meanwhile, the Polish duke Bolesław I installed Boleslaus' kinsman Vladivoj on the Bohemian throne. Vladivoj was apparently an alcoholic, however, and died within a year. After the death of Vladivoj in 1003, the Bohemian nobles invited Jaromír and Oldřich back from exile. In turn, they each later assumed the throne at Prague.

On 9 February 1003, Boleslaus the Red was restored to authority with armed support from Duke Bolesław of Poland. Boleslaus's brothers Jaromír and Oldřich again fled to Germany and placed themselves under the protection of Henry II. But Boleslaus soon undermined his own position by ordering a massacre of the nobles of the Vršovci clan at Vyšehrad. According to the chronicler Thietmar of Merseburg, Boleslav slashed his son-in-law to death with his own sword.

Nobles who survived the massacre secretly sent messengers to Bolesław the Brave of Poland and entreated him to save them. The Polish duke willingly agreed and invited his Czech namesake to visit him at his castle (probably in Kraków). There, Boleslaus the Red was trapped, blinded and imprisoned. He never returned to Bohemia. Bolesław the Brave claimed the ducal throne for himself, invaded Bohemia in 1003 and took Prague without any serious opposition; he ruled as Duke Boleslaus IV for a little over a year. He then gave up his claim to the duchy of Bohemia and was replaced by Jaromír, who, backed by Henry II, entered through the Prague gates and in 1004 received the Bohemian duchy as a fief from the hands of the German king.

== See also ==
- Thietmar of Merseburg. Chronik. Neu übertragen und erläutet von W. Trillmich, B. 1957.
- Cosmas of Prague. Chronicle of Bohemians.

Boleslaus III of Bohemia Přemyslid dynasty Born: c. 965 Died: 1037
Preceded by Boleslaus II	Duke of Bohemia; 999–1002	Succeeded by Vladivoj
