= Adiva =

10th-century Bohemian noblewoman

Adiva (fl. c. 10th century CE) was the first wife of Boleslaus II of Bohemia. It has been speculated that she was the progeny of Edward the Elder, King of England, and his second wife Aelfflaed, but the evidence for this is weak. Favouring the conjecture is the similarity of her name to certain Anglo-Saxon forms, and the introduction of English-influenced coinage into Bohemia. Nevertheless, since there are a handful of other possible candidates, the evidence for the hypothesis must be counted insufficient.

She and Boleslaus had the following children:

- Boleslaus III of Bohemia
- Wenceslaus (died as an infant)
- Jaromir of Bohemia
- Oldrich of Bohemia
