= Oldřich, Duke of Bohemia =

Duke of Bohemia from 1012 to 1033 (and briefly in 1034)

Oldřich I
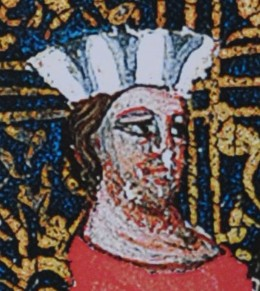
- Depiction in the Chronicle of Dalimil, 14th century

Duke of Bohemia
- Reign: 1012 – 1033
- Predecessor: Jaromír
- Successor: Jaromír

Duke of Bohemia
- Reign: 1034
- Predecessor: Jaromír
- Successor: Bretislaus I
- Born: c. 975
- Died: 9 November 1034
- Spouse: Božena
- Issue: Bretislaus I
- Dynasty: Přemyslid
- Father: Boleslaus II of Bohemia
- Mother: Emma of Mělník

Oldřich I (Latin: Odalricus, Udalrichus; German: Odalric, Udalrich; c. 975 – 9 November 1034), a member of the Přemyslid dynasty, was Duke of Bohemia from 1012 to 1033 and briefly again in 1034. His accession to the Bohemian throne marked the start of a phase of stability after a long period of internal dynastic struggles. Under his rule, the Moravian lands were reconquered from Polish occupation.

== Life ==
Oldřich was the fourth (third surviving) son of Duke Boleslaus II of Bohemia (d. 999). his mother was Emma of Mělník. Upon the death of his father, his eldest brother Boleslaus III succeeded as duke, however, he soon entered into a fierce conflict with his younger brothers Oldřich and Jaromír. In 1001, both had to flee to the Bavarian court at Regensburg. When Boleslaus III was deposed by the rival Vršovci dynasty the next year and the Polish ruler Bolesław I the Brave invaded Bohemia, King Henry II of Germany intervened. As a part of Henry's expedition to Prague, Boleslaus's brothers were able to return to Bohemia, and Jaromír was installed as Bohemian duke in 1004.

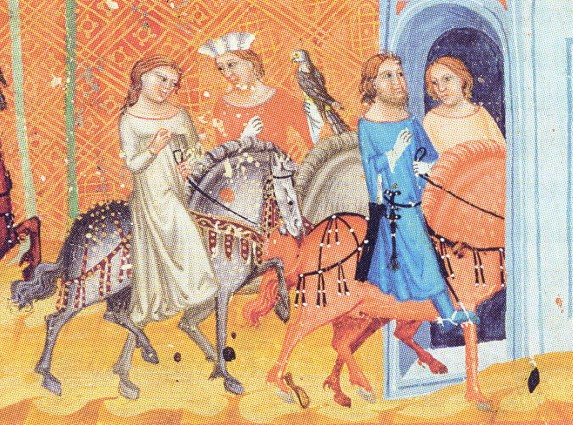
Oldřich and his wife Božena enter Prague, Chronicle of Dalimil

In the German–Polish War of 1002–18, Duke Jaromír remained a loyal supporter of the German king. Nevertheless, Henry did not take action when he was deposed and blinded by his brother Oldřich on 12 April 1012. While Jaromír fled to Poland, Oldřich recognised the sovereignty of the German king. He secured his rule by suppressing the Vršovci insurgents.

Oldřich and his son Bretislaus sought to win back Moravia, once conquered from the Poles by Oldřich's grandfather Duke Boleslaus I. Bretislaus and his wife Judith of Schweinfurt took up residence in Olomouc. In 1029, the Bohemian forces, backed by Holy Roman Emperor Conrad II, finally drove the Poles out of the eastern lands. However, Bretislaus's efforts to occupy adjacent territories in what is today Slovakia by marching against the forces of the Kingdom of Hungary failed in 1030 due to the jealousy of the emperor, who reached an agreement with King Stephen I. In the following year, Bohemian forces refused to take the field for the emperor.

In 1032, Duke Oldřich was invited to the Hoftag diet at Merseburg, but did not appear. His absence raised the ire of the emperor and Conrad, busy with events in Burgundy, charged his son Henry III with punishing the recalcitrant Bohemian. Oldřich was arrested, deposed and sent to Bavaria. He was again replaced by his brother Jaromír. However, when Oldřich was pardoned the next year, he returned to Bohemia and had Jaromír captured, blinded, and deposed. He seized power again and drove out Jaromír's son from Moravia.

Oldřich died abruptly on 9 November 1034 during a banquet.

== Marriage and children ==
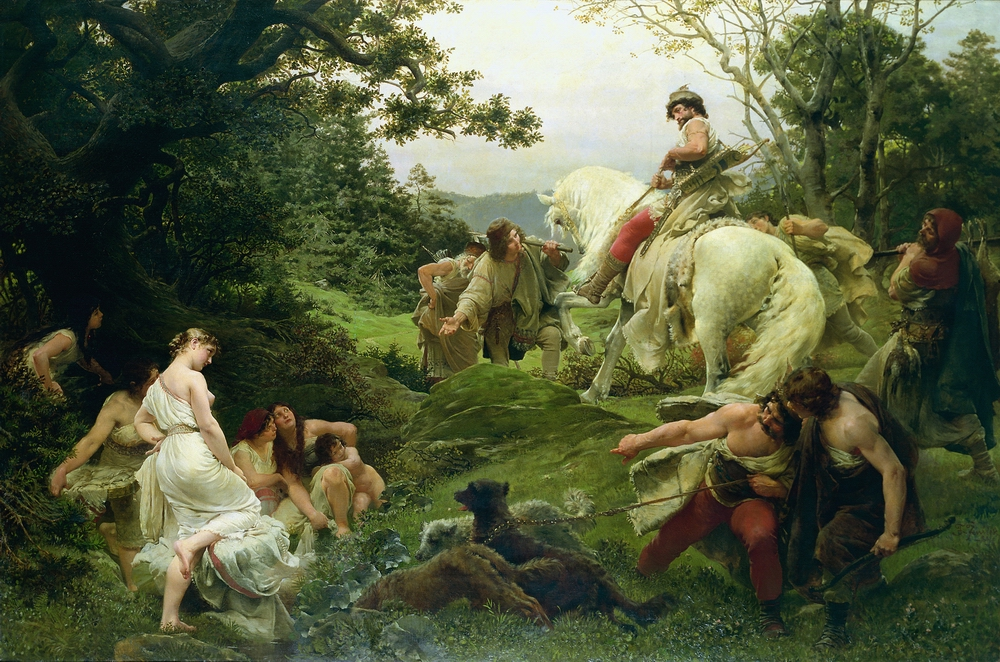
Oldřich and Božena, painting by František Ženíšek, 1884

According to legend rendered by the medieval chronicler Cosmas of Prague, Duke Oldřich about 1002 married a Božena, daughter of Křesina, after discarding his first wife on the grounds that they were childless. Together they had a son:

- Bretislaus I (1002/1005–1055), Duke of Bohemia from 1035 until his death

== Notes ==
Oldřich, Duke of Bohemia Přemyslid dynasty Born: c. 975 Died: 11 November 1034
Regnal titles
Preceded by Jaromír	Duke of Bohemia; 1012–1033	Succeeded by Jaromír
Preceded by Jaromír	Duke of Bohemia; 1034	Succeeded by Bretislaus I
