= Boleslaus II of Bohemia =

Duke of Bohemia from 972 to 999

Boleslaus II
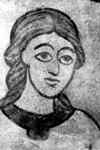
- 12th-century fresco in the Znojmo Rotunda,

Duke of Bohemia
- Reign: July 967/972 – 7 February 999
- Predecessor: Boleslaus I
- Successor: Boleslaus III
- Born: c. 932
- Died: 7 February 999 (aged c. 67)
- Burial: St. George's Basilica, Prague
- Spouse: Adiva; Emma of Mělník
- Issue: Boleslaus III; Jaromír; Oldřich
- Dynasty: Přemyslid
- Father: Boleslaus I, Duke of Bohemia
- Mother: Biagota

Boleslaus II the Pious (Czech: Boleslav II. Pobožný, Polish: Bolesław II Pobożny; c. 932 – 7 February 999), a member of the Přemyslid dynasty, was Duke of Bohemia from 972 until his death in 999.

== Life and reign ==
Boleslaus was an elder son of Duke Boleslaus I the Cruel and brother of the three other children of his father who survived to adulthood: Strachkvas, Doubravka (the wife of Duke Mieszko I of Poland) and the abbess Mlada. His mother may have been Biagota, a mysterious figure known only from her coins. According to some historians, she was the wife of Boleslaus I.

=== Alliances ===
Boleslaus II took over the rule of the Duchy of Bohemia as kníže (a title that may be translated either as duke or prince) on his father's death in 972. Like his father, Boleslaus II initially quarrelled with the Ottonian kings of Germany. In 974, he and Duke Mieszko I of Poland supported the rebellious Duke Henry II of Bavaria in his civil war against the rule of Emperor Otto II. In 976, Henry was defeated and fled to Boleslaus' court at Prague Castle, after which Otto's forces campaigned in the Bohemian lands. Finally in 978, Boleslaus solemnly pledged allegiance to the emperor at the Easter festivities in Quedlinburg.

In turn, relations with Poland deteriorated from about 980 onwards. When Emperor Otto II died in 983 and was succeeded by his minor son Otto III, the Bohemian alliance with Poland was discarded, as Boleslaus again allied with the insurgent Bavarian Duke Henry, while Mieszko I took the side of the young king. Moreover, when Boleslaus occupied the Saxon Margravate of Meissen, he thwarted the plans of Mieszko's son Bolesław, who had married a daughter of Margrave Ricdag. In 987, Boleslaus had to retire from Meissen, and from about 990, he sparked a long-lasting conflict with Poland around the lands of Silesia and Lesser Poland (the Polish-Bohemian War). In 992, he approached King Otto III and participated in an unsuccessful campaign against the Lutici tribes in the wake of the Great Slav Rising of 983.

=== Unification of the Bohemian lands ===
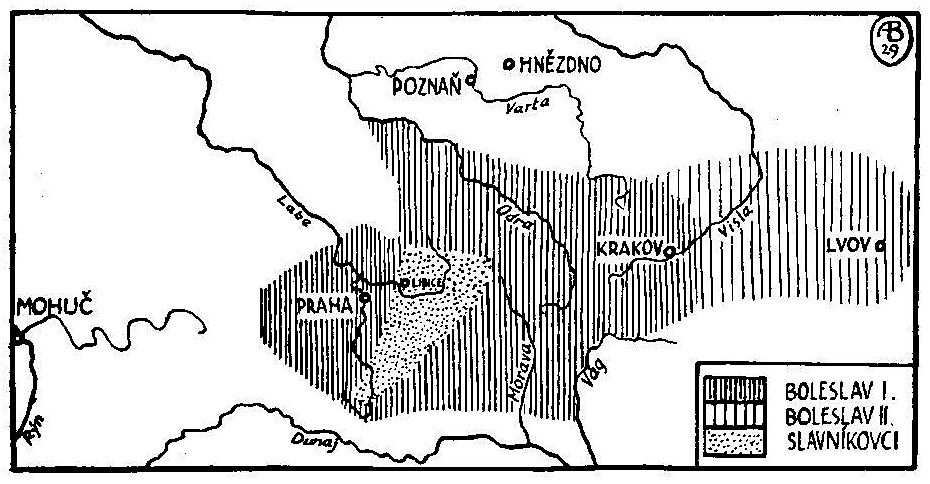
Bohemian lands during the reign of Boleslaus I and Boleslaus II

Boleslaus's reign is most notable for the foundation of the Diocese of Prague in 973, which earned him the epithet "The Pious" by the medieval chronicler Cosmas of Prague. Nevertheless, the Bohemian diocese was placed at that time within the jurisdiction of the Archbishop of Mainz, and Emperor Otto II enforced the appointment of the Saxon monk Thietmar (Dětmar) as first bishop.

Meanwhile, the struggle with the rival Slavník dynasty flared up again from 981 onwards, when Prince Soběslav of the Slavník dynasty began to forge alliances with the Polish and Saxons. Upon Bishop Dětmar's death in 982, Soběslav's brother Adalbert (later known as Saint Adalbert of Prague) was appointed his successor until he abandoned his primacy to lead a mission to the Old Prussians in 994. On 28 September 995, Boleslaus' forces and the confederate Vršovci clan stormed Libice Castle in east-central Bohemia and massacred the members of the Slavník dynasty that were found there. Boleslaus's brutal triumph ensured the unity of Bohemia under a single ruler.

== Marriages and issue ==
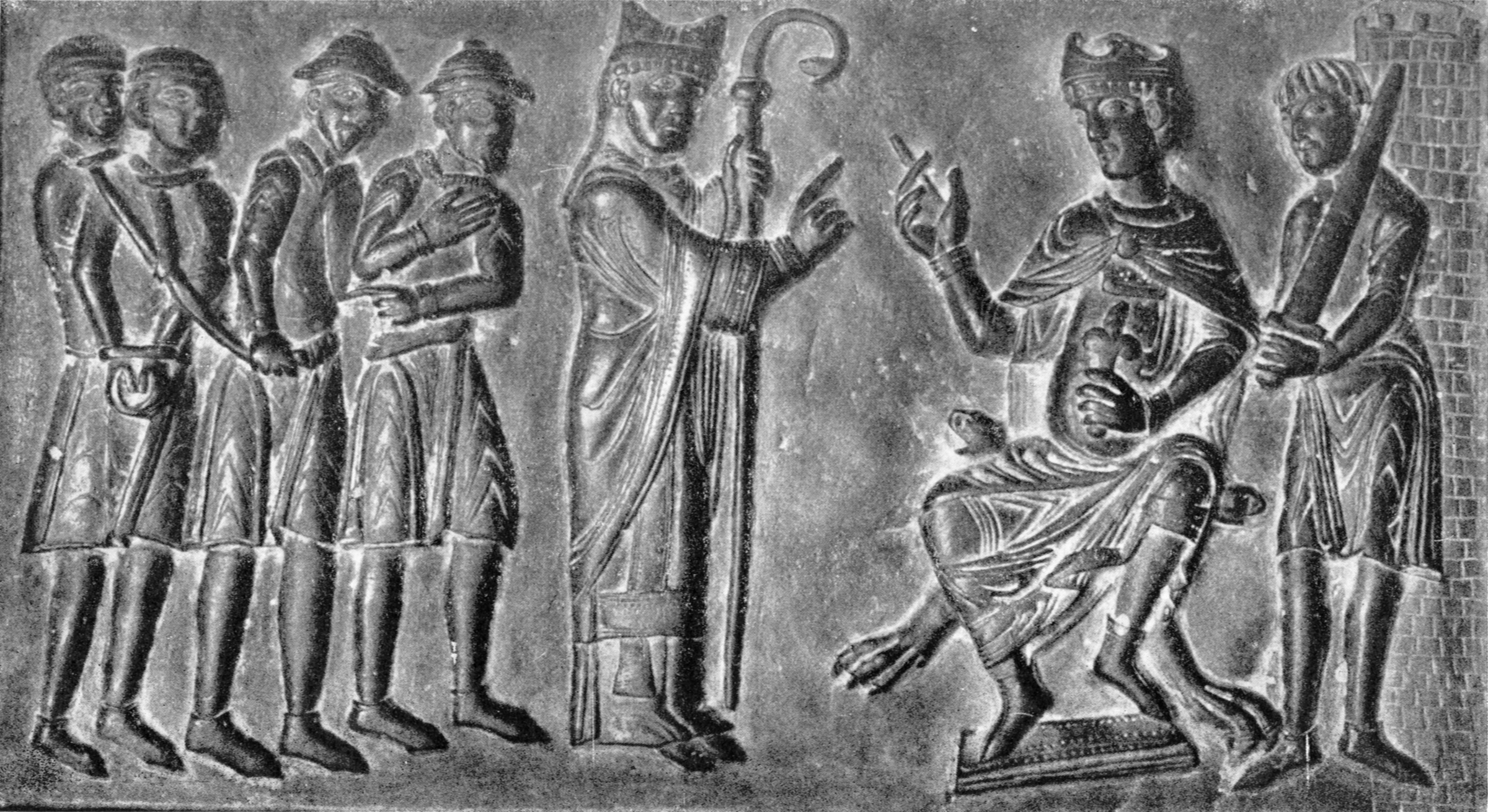
St Adalbert of Prague pleads with Boleslaus II for the release of Christian slaves, Gniezno Cathedral door - detail

Boleslaus's first wife Adiva may have been a daughter of the English king Edward the Elder (the daughter known to English historians as "Ælfgifu" who married a prince "near the Alps"), though the evidence for this is weak. His second wife was Emma of Mělník. It is certain that Boleslaus's oldest son was born by Adiva, but the mother of the others cannot be established with certainty:

- Boleslaus III (c. 965 – 1037), his eldest son and successor
- Wenceslaus, died as an infant
- Jaromír (c. 975 - 1035), became Duke of Bohemia in 1003
- Oldřich (c. 975 – 1034), became Duke of Bohemia in 1012.

Soon after his father's death, Boleslaus III entered into conflict with his brothers and was deposed in 1002. The internal struggles of the Přemyslid dynasty shook the Bohemian duchy until Duke Oldřich's efforts stabilised the country.

== Bibliography ==
- Krofta, Kamil (1957). "Bohemia to the Extinction of the Premyslids". In Tanner, J.R.; Previte-Orton, C.W.; Brooke, Z.N. (eds.). Cambridge Medieval History:Victory of the Papacy. Vol. VI. Cambridge University Press.
- Joanna A. Sobiesiak: Bolesław II Przemyślida (†999): Dynasta i jego państwo. Kraków: Avalon, 2006

Boleslaus II of Bohemia Přemyslid dynasty Born: c. 927/928 Died: 7 February 999
Preceded by Boleslaus I	Duke of Bohemia; 972–999	Succeeded by Boleslaus III
