= Duchy of Bohemia =

Historical state

Duchy of Bohemia Češské kniežěstvie (Old Czech) Ducatus Bohemiæ (Latin) Herzogtuom Bēheim (Middle High German)
- c. 870–1198
- Arms of the Přemyslid dynasty

- Duchy of Bohemia within the Holy Roman Empire, 11th century

- Duchy of Bohemia and the Holy Roman Empire after 1029
- Status: Imperial State of the Holy Roman Empire (from 1002)
- Capital: Prague
- Common languages: Old Czech, Latin
- Religion: Roman Catholicism; Eastern Orthodoxy; Slavic paganism; Judaism
- Government: Feudal monarchy (duchy)
- Duke
  - c. 875–888/9: Bořivoj I (first duke)
  - 1192–93, 1197–98: Ottokar I (last duke, king to 1230)
- History
  - Duchy established: c. 870
  - Bořivoj I moved seat to Prague Castle: 875
  - State of the Holy Roman Empire: 1002
  - Raised to Kingdom: 1198
  - Confirmed by Golden Bull of Sicily: 1212
Preceded by
Bohemian tribes
Great Moravia
Succeeded by
Czech lands
∟ Kingdom of Bohemia
∟ Margraviate of Moravia

The Duchy of Bohemia, also later referred to in English as the Czech Duchy, (Old Czech: Češské kniežěstvie) was a monarchy and a principality of the Holy Roman Empire in Central Europe during the Early and High Middle Ages. It was formed around 870 by Czechs as part of the Great Moravian realm. Bohemia separated from disintegrating Great Moravia after Duke Spytihněv swore fealty to the East Frankish king Arnulf in 895.

While the Bohemian dukes of the Přemyslid dynasty, at first ruling at Prague Castle and Levý Hradec, brought further estates under their control, the Christianization initiated by Saints Cyril and Methodius was continued by the Frankish bishops of Regensburg and Passau. In 973, the Diocese of Prague was founded through the joint efforts of Duke Boleslaus II and Emperor Otto I. Later Duke Wenceslaus I of Bohemia, killed by his younger brother Boleslaus in September 935, became the land's patron saint.

While the lands were occupied by the Polish king Bolesław I and internal struggles shook the Přemyslid dynasty, Duke Vladivoj received Bohemia as a fief from the hands of the East Frankish king Henry II in 1002 and the duchy became an Imperial State of the Holy Roman Empire. The Duchy of Bohemia was raised to a hereditary Kingdom of Bohemia, when Duke Ottokar I ensured his elevation by the German king Philip of Swabia in 1198. The Přemyslids remained in power throughout the High Middle Ages, until the extinction of the male line with the death of King Wenceslaus III in 1306.

== History ==
The lands encompassed by the Bohemian Forest, the Ore Mountains, the Sudetes and the Bohemian-Moravian Highlands were settled by Slavic Bohemian peoples about 550. In the 7th century, the local Czech people were part of the union led by the Frankish merchant Samo (d. 658). Bohemia as a geographical term, probably derived from the Celtic (Gallic) Boii tribes, first appeared in 9th-century Frankish sources. In 805, Emperor Charlemagne prepared to conquer the lands, invading Bohemia in 805 and laying siege to the fortress of Canburg. However, the Czech forces shirked from open battle and retired into the deep forests to launch guerilla attacks. After forty days the emperor had to withdraw his forces for the lack of supplies. When the Frankish forces returned the next year burning and plundering the Bohemian lands, the local tribes finally had to submit and became dependent on the Carolingian Empire.

=== Great Moravia ===
Great Moravia under the rule of Svatopluk I (871–894).

While the Frankish realm disintegrated in the mid-9th century, Bohemia fell under the influence of the Great Moravian state which was established around 830. In 874, the Mojmir duke Svatopluk I reached an agreement with the East Frankish king Louis the German and confirmed his Bohemian dominion. With the fragmentation of Great Moravia under the pressure of the Magyar incursions around 900, Bohemia began to form as an independent principality. Already in 880, the Přemyslid prince Bořivoj from Levý Hradec, initially a deputy of Duke Svatopluk I who had been baptised by the Great Moravian archbishop Methodius of Salonica in 874, moved his residence to Prague Castle and started to subjugate the Vltava Basin.

Great Moravia briefly regained control over the emerging Bohemian principality upon Bořivoj's death in 888/890 until, in 895, his son Spytihněv together with the Slavník prince Witizla swore allegiance to the East Frankish king Arnulf of Carinthia in Regensburg. He and his younger brother Vratislaus then ruled over Central Bohemia around Prague. They were able to protect their realm from the Magyar forces which crushed an East Frankish army in the 907 Battle of Pressburg during the Hungarian conquest of the Carpathian Basin. Cut off from Byzantium by the Hungarian presence, the Bohemian principality existed as independent state though still in the shadow of East Francia; the dukes paid tribute to the Bavarian dukes in exchange for the confirmation of the peace treaty. Vratislaus' son Wenceslaus, who ruled from 921, was already accepted as head of the Bohemian tribal union; however, he had to cope with the enmity of his neighbour Duke Arnulf of Bavaria and his mighty ally, the Saxon king Henry I of Germany. Wenceslaus maintained his ducal authority by submitting to King Henry in 929, whereafter he was murdered by his brother Boleslaus.

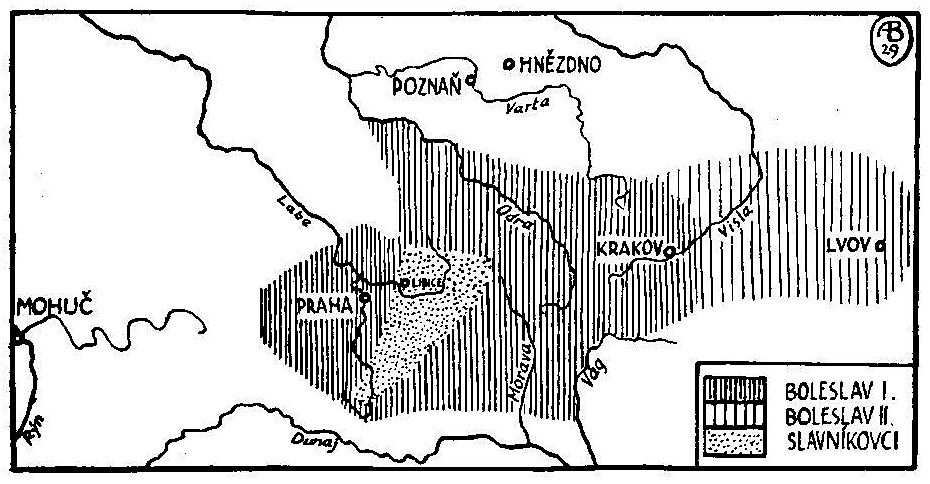
Duchy of Bohemia under Boleslaus I. and Boleslaus II.

Assuming the Bohemian throne in 935, Duke Boleslaus conquered the adjacent lands of Moravia and Silesia, and expanded farther to Kraków in the east. He offered opposition to Henry's successor King Otto I, stopped paying the tribute, attacked an ally of the Saxons in northwest Bohemia and in 936 moved into Thuringia. After a prolonged armed conflict, King Otto I besieged a castle owned by Boleslaus' son in 950 and Boleslaus finally signed a peace treaty whereby he recognized Otto's suzerainty and promised to resume the payment of the tribute. As the king's ally, his Bohemian troops, together with those of the Kingdom of Germany, fought in the 955 Battle of Lechfeld and after the defeat of the Magyars received the lands of Moravia in recognition of his services.

Overwhelming the marauding Hungarians had the same benefits for Germans and Czechs. Less obvious is what Boleslav I the Cruel wanted to gain by participating in the war against the Obotrite tribes in far north, when he crushed an uprising of two Slavic dukes (Stojgněv and Nakon) in the Saxon Billung March. Probably Boleslav wanted to ensure that his German neighbors did not interfere with his expansion of Bohemia to the east.

Significantly, the Bishopric of Prague, founded in 973 during the reign of Duke Boleslaus II, was subordinated to the Archbishopric of Mainz. Thus, at the same time that Přemyslid rulers used the German alliance to consolidate their rule against a perpetually rebellious regional nobility, they struggled to retain their autonomy in relation to the empire. The Bohemian principality was definitively consolidated in 995, when the Přemyslids defeated their Slavník rivals, unified the Czech tribes, and established a form of centralized rule, albeit shaken by internal dynastic struggles.

=== Holy Roman Empire ===
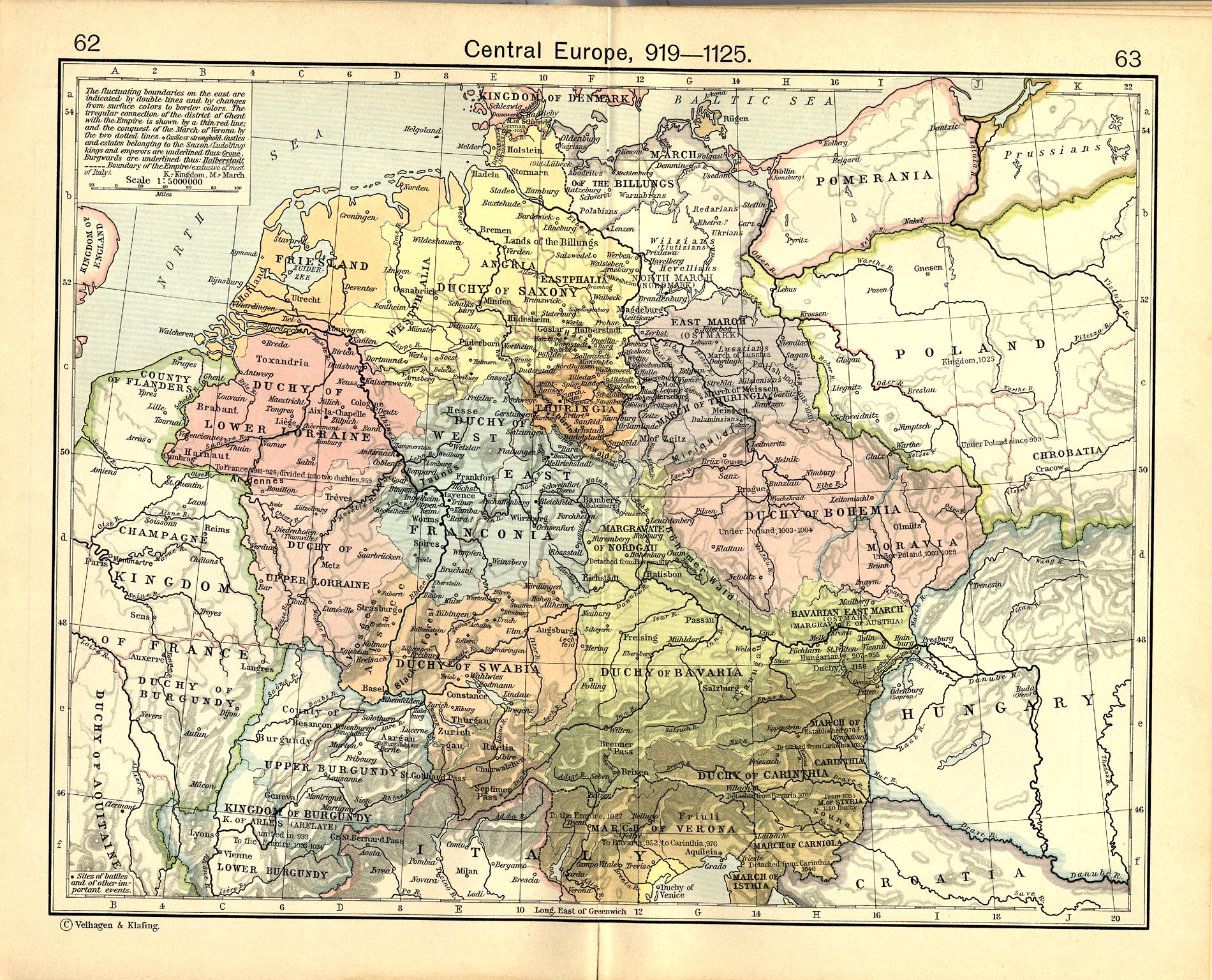
Duchy of Bohemia within Central Europe in 919-1125

In 1002, Duke Vladivoj was enfeoffed with the Duchy of Bohemia from the hands of King Henry II of Germany. With this act, what had been a fully sovereign duchy became part of the Holy Roman Empire. After Vladivoj died the next year, the Polish duke Bolesław I the Brave invaded Bohemia and Moravia and ruled as Boleslaus IV. In 1004, after the Poles were expelled from Bohemia with help from Henry II, Duke Jaromír received the duchy in fief from the king.

Duke Bretislaus I of Bohemia re-acquired the Moravian lands in 1019 or 1029, which thenceforth were usually ruled by a younger son of the Bohemian duke/king. About 1031, Bretislaus invaded Hungary to prevent its future expansion and, in 1035, he helped the Emperor against the Lusatians. In 1039, he invaded Poland, captured Poznań and ravaged Gniezno; after that he conquered part of Silesia including Breslau. The destruction of Gniezno pushed the Polish rulers to move their capital to Kraków. In 1040, Bretislaus defeated the German King Henry's invasion into Bohemia in the Battle at Brůdek. However, the next year Henry besieged Bretislaus in Prague and forced him to renounce all of his conquests except Moravia. In 1047, Henry negotiated a peace treaty between Bretislaus and the Poles.

The son of Bretislaus, Vratislaus II, supported Henry against the Pope, anti-kings, and rebellions in Saxony in his long reign. The Bohemian troops showed conspicuous bravery and, in 1083, he entered Rome with Henry and their armed forces. Henry gave Vratislaus a lifetime appointment as the first King of Bohemia in 1085 out of gratitude. For his successor Bretislaus II foreign policy was largely concerned with the Silesian conflict, when the Poles did not pay a fee for areas once resigned by Bretislaus I.

In 1147, the Bohemian duke, Vladislaus II, accompanied the German king, Conrad III, on the Second Crusade, but halted his march at Constantinople. Thanks to his military support against northern Italian cities (especially Milan) for the emperor Frederick Barbarossa, Vladislaus was elected king of Bohemia on 11 January 1158, becoming the second Bohemian king.

== Economy ==
The Duchy earned a significant income from the Prague slave trade, trafficking Pagan Slavs, termed as saqaliba, to slavery in al-Andalus in the 10th and 11th centuries.

Mining of tin and silver began in the Ore mountains in the early 12th century.

== Kingdom of Bohemia ==
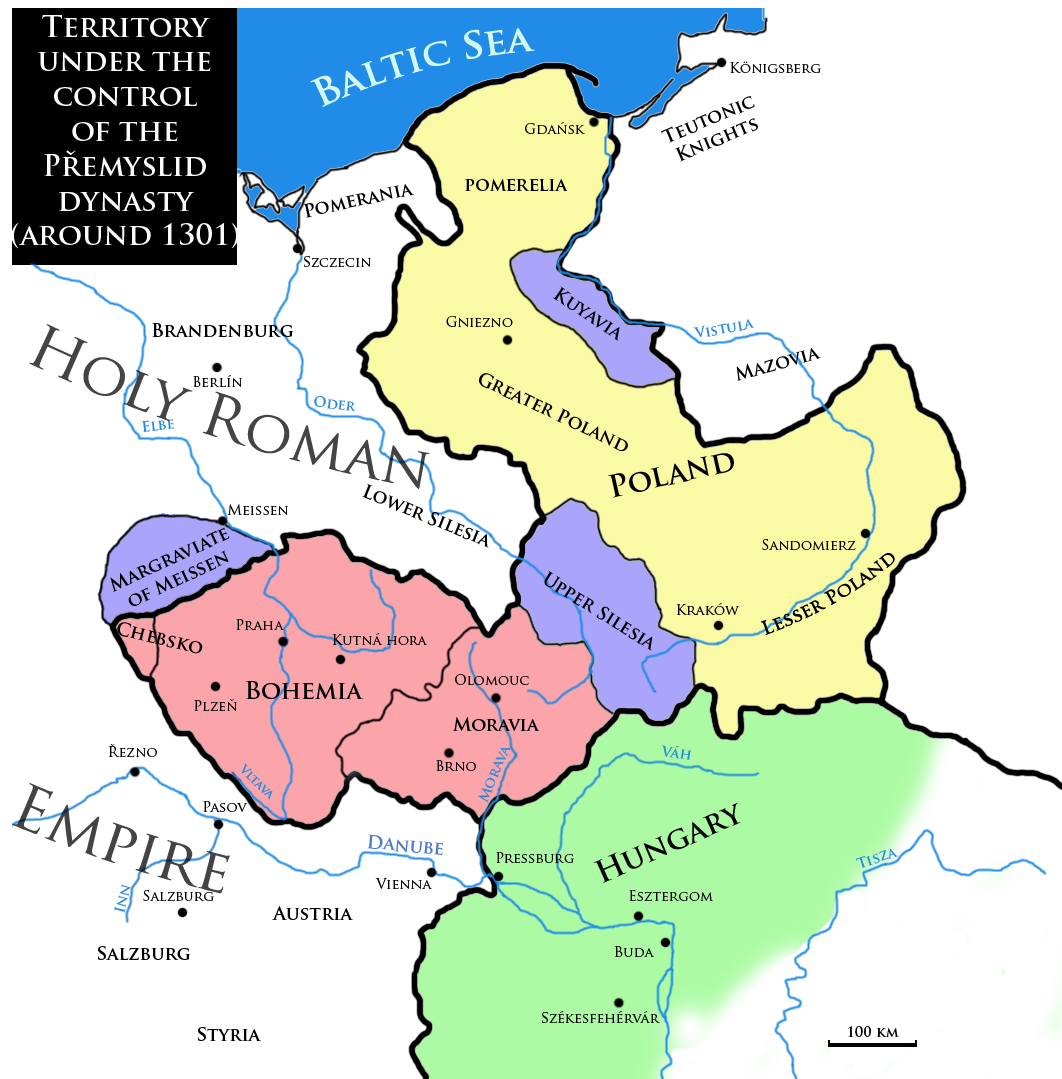
Territory under the control of the Přemyslid dynasty around 1301

During the German civil war between the Hohenstaufen king Philip of Swabia and his Welf rival Otto IV, Duke Ottokar I of Bohemia decided to support Philip, for which he was awarded with a royal coronation in 1198, this time as a hereditary title. In 1200, however, Ottokar abandoned his pact with Philip and declared for the Welf faction. Both Otto and Pope Innocent III subsequently accepted Ottokar as hereditary King of Bohemia. The Bohemian principality was then reborn into the Bohemian kingdom.

In 1212, Ottokar I, bearing the title "king" since 1198, extracted the Golden Bull of Sicily—a formal edict by the Hohenstaufen emperor Frederick II confirming the royal title for Ottokar and his descendants, whereby his duchy was formally raised to a kingdom. The Bohemian king would be exempt from all future obligations to the Holy Roman Empire except for participation in the imperial councils. The imperial prerogative to ratify each Bohemian ruler and to appoint the Bishop of Prague was revoked. The country then reached its greatest territorial extent and is considered its Golden Age.

After the extinction of the Přemyslid dynasty, the Lands of the Bohemian Crown were ruled by the House of Luxembourg from 1310, until the death of Emperor Sigismund in 1437. After the Middle Ages, the Kingdom of Bohemia remained under the rule of the Austrian House of Habsburg from 1526 until the collapse of Austria-Hungary after the First World War.

== See also ==
- Christianization of Bohemia
- History of the Czech lands
- Holy Roman Empire

== Sources ==
- Berend, Nora; Urbańczyk, Przemysław; Wiszewski, Przemysław (2013). Central Europe in the High Middle Ages: Bohemia, Hungary and Poland, c.900–c.1300. Cambridge: Cambridge University Press. ISBN 978-1107651395.
- Bradbury, Jim (2004). The Routledge Companion to Medieval Warfare. Routledge. ISBN 978-1134598472.
