= Cidlina =

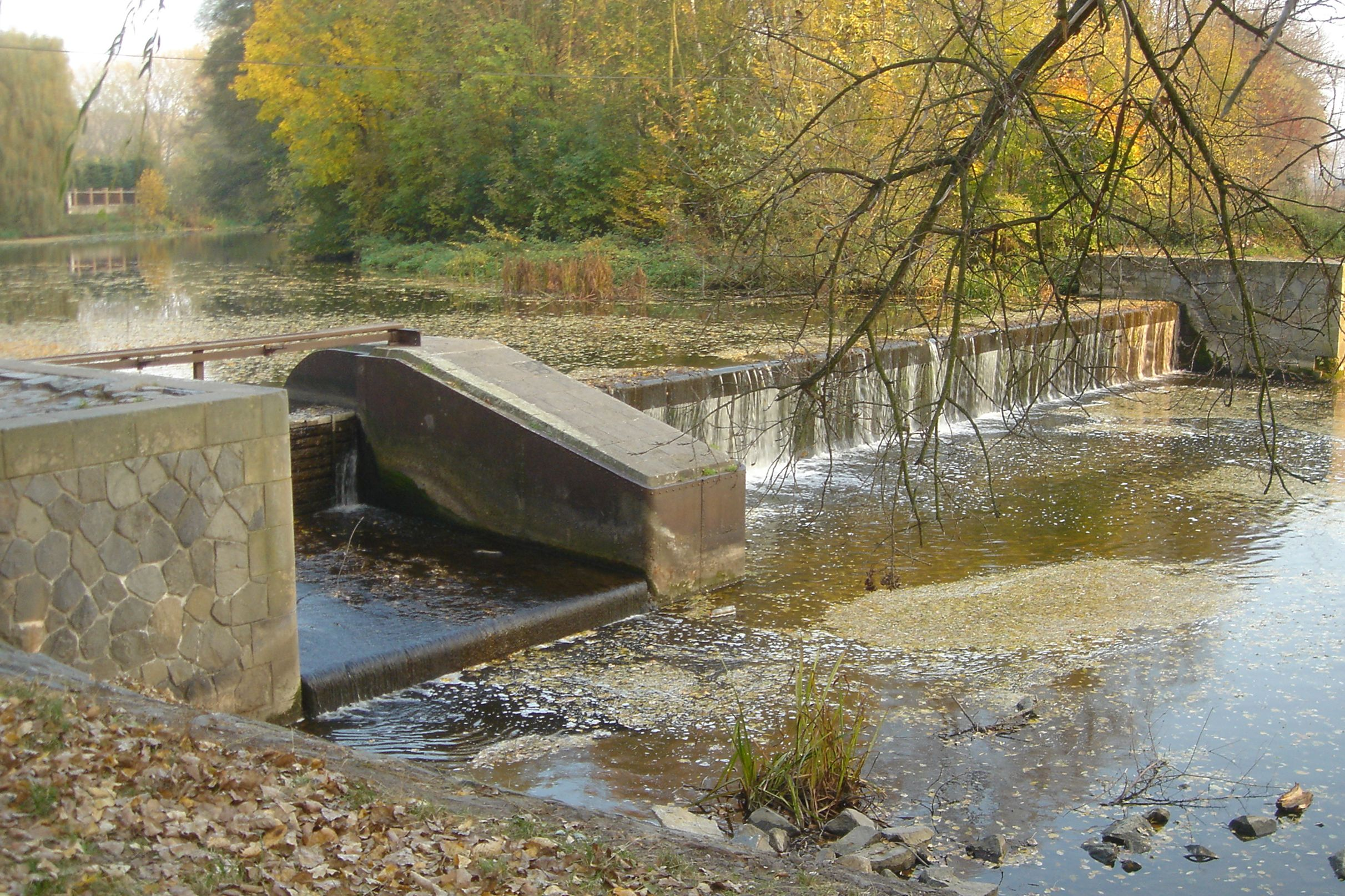
- A weir in Libice nad Cidlinou

Location
- Country: Czech Republic
- Regions: Liberec; Hradec Králové; Central Bohemian

Physical characteristics
- Source
  - location: Lomnice nad Popelkou, Ještěd–Kozákov Ridge
  - coordinates: 50°31′9″N 15°20′53″E
  - elevation: 563 m (1,847 ft)
- Mouth
  - location: Elbe
  - coordinates: 50°7′22″N 15°9′31″E
  - elevation: 186 m (610 ft)
- Length: 87.3 km (54.2 mi)
- Basin size: 1,164.5 km^{2} (449.6 sq mi)
- Discharge
  - average: 5.2 m^{3}/s (180 cu ft/s) near estuary

Basin features
- Progression: Elbe→ North Sea

The Cidlina (Czech pronunciation: [ˈtsɪdlɪna]) is a river in the Czech Republic, a right tributary of the Elbe River. It originates in the Liberec Region, but flows mainly through the Hradec Králové and Central Bohemian regions. It is 87.3 km (54.2 mi) long.

== Etymology ==
According to one theory, the name of the river is of Celtic origin and was composed of the words sīd(o) (meaning 'calm' or 'peace') and lèana (meaning 'wet meadow'). According to another theory, the name comes from the Proto-Slavic adjective cědlá, which meant 'clear', 'clean'.

== Characteristic ==
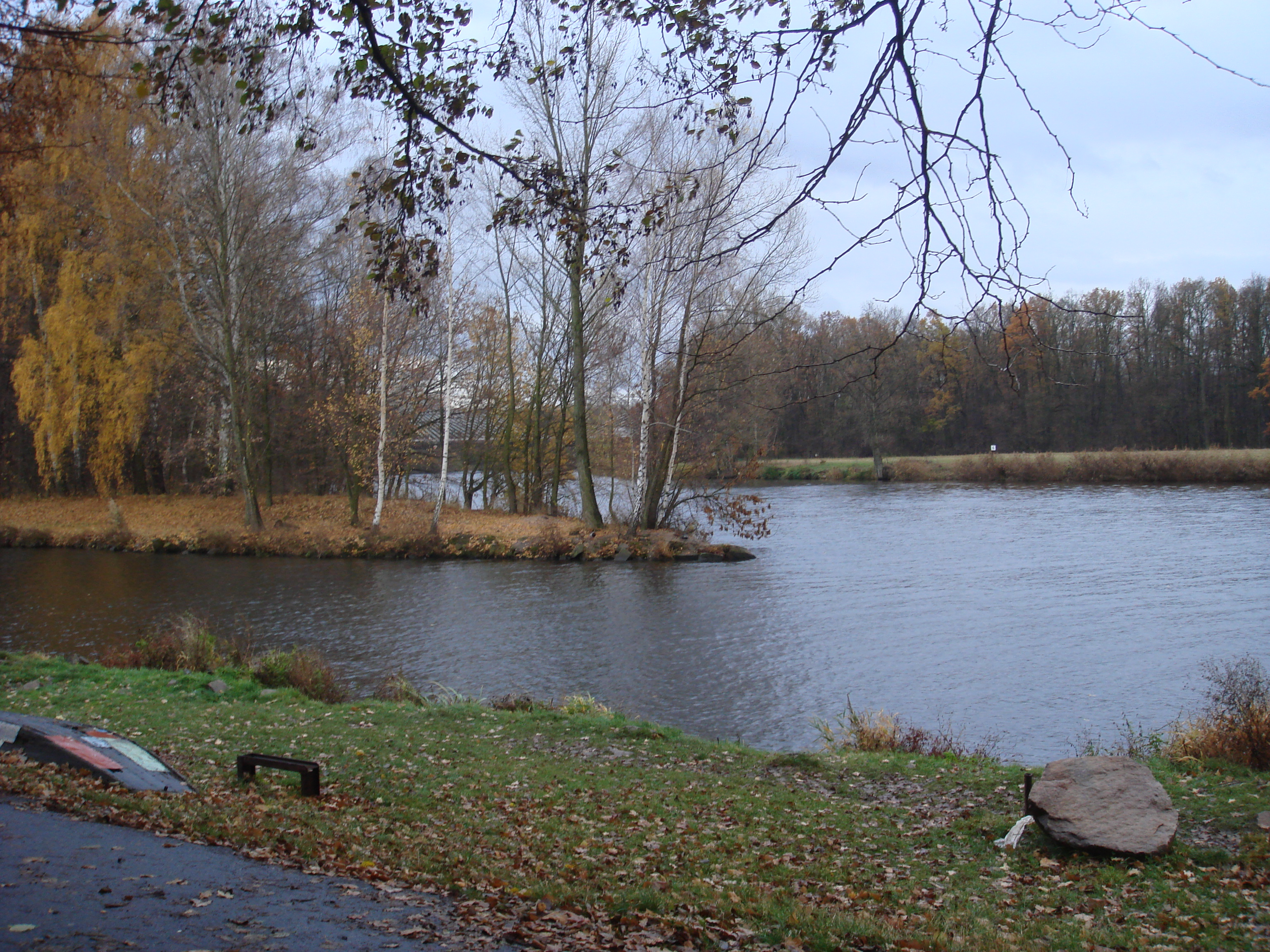
Confluence of the Cidlina (front) and Elbe

The Cidlina originates in the territory of Lomnice nad Popelkou in the Ještěd–Kozákov Ridge at an elevation of 563 m (1,847 ft) and flows to Libice nad Cidlinou, where it enters the Elbe River at an elevation of 186 m (610 ft). About 1.5 km south of the main spring there is the secondary spring of the Cidlina. The river is 225.9 km (140.4 mi) long. Its drainage basin has an area of 1,164.5 km^{2} (449.6 sq mi).

The longest tributaries of the Cidlina are:

Tributary	Length (km)	River km	Side
Bystřice	62.7	29.0	left
Javorka	39.0	44.4	left
Králický potok	20.0	66.8	left
Úlibický potok	17.5	66.8	left
Zábědovský potok	16.7	39.1	right

== Settlements ==
The most notable settlement on the river is the town of Jičín. The river flows through the municipal territories of Železnice, Jičín, Vitiněves, Slatiny, Žeretice, Vysoké Veselí, Smidary, Skřivany, Nový Bydžov, Mlékosrby, Chlumec nad Cidlinou, Olešnice, Žiželice, Choťovice, Žehuň, Dobšice, Sány, Opolany and Libice nad Cidlinou.

== Bodies of water ==
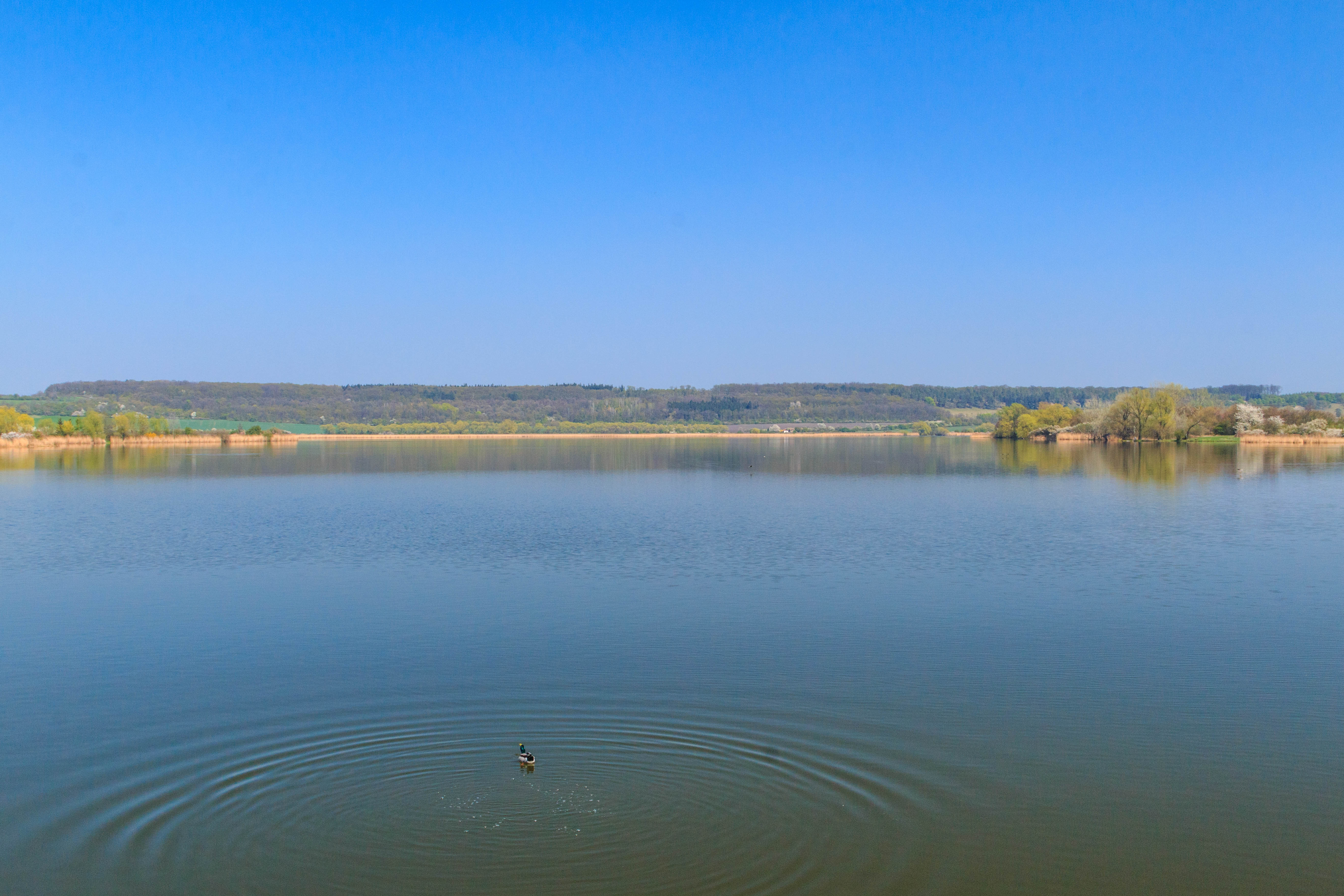
Žehuňský Pond

The largest body of water on the Cidlina and in its whole basin area is the Žehuňský Pond with an area of 173 ha (430 acres). There are 126 bodies of water larger than 1 ha in the basin area.

== Protection of nature ==
On the upper reaches of the river there is an extensive nature monument called Javorka a Cidlina – Sběř. It has an area of 272.9 ha (674 acres) and, in addition to the Cidlina bed, it also covers the bed of the lower course of the Javorka and some areas on the banks of the Cidlina. The reason for the protection is to ensure a stable population of species of plants and animals that are endangered and protected within the Czech Republic, especially the thick shelled river mussel, the dusky large blue, the Eurasian otter and the green snaketail.

The area of the fishpond Žehuňský rybník and its surroundings is protected as Žehuňský rybník National Nature Monument. It has an area of 301.6 ha (745 acres). Endangered species found here include the narrow-mouthed whorl snail and several rare species of the genus Taraxacum (bavaricum, pauckertianum and irrigatum).

The secondary spring of the Cidlina is located in Jezírko pod Táborem Nature Monument on an area of 0.3 ha (0.7 acres). It is a small peat pond with a population of the round-leaved sundew.

== Tourism ==
The Cidlina is suitable for river tourism. About 76 km (47 mi) of the river is navigable. Its calm flow makes it suitable for beginner paddlers.

== See also ==
- List of rivers of the Czech Republic
