= Lužec nad Cidlinou =

- Municipality
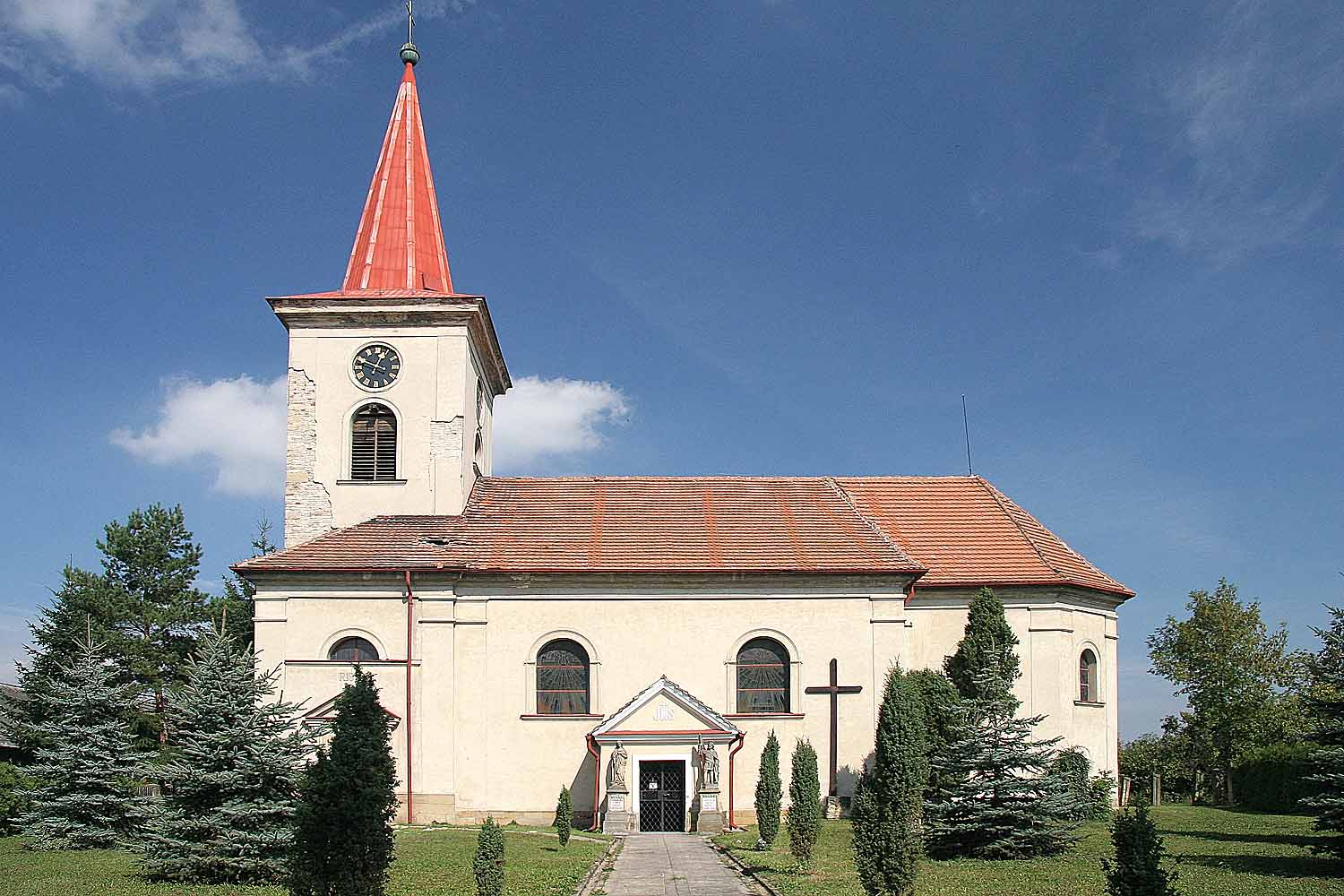
- Church of Saint George

- Flag Coat of arms

- Location in the Czech Republic
- Coordinates: 50°12′49″N 15°24′43″E
- Country: Czech Republic
- Region: Hradec Králové
- District: Hradec Králové
- First mentioned: 1325

Area
  - Total: 11.73 km^{2} (4.53 sq mi)
- Elevation: 229 m (751 ft)

Population (2026-01-01)
  - Total: 519
  - Density: 44.2/km^{2} (115/sq mi)
- Time zone: UTC+1 (CET)
  - Summer (DST): UTC+2 (CEST)
- Postal code: 503 62
- Website: www.luzecnadcidlinou.cz

Lužec nad Cidlinou is a municipality and village in Hradec Králové District in the Hradec Králové Region of the Czech Republic. It has about 500 inhabitants.

== Etymology ==
The name Lužec is a diminutive of the Czech word luh, i.e. 'floodplain'.

== Geography ==
Lužec nad Cidlinou is located about 28 kilometres (17 mi) west of Hradec Králové. It lies in a flat agricultural landscape in the East Elbe Table. The stream Lužecký potok flows though the municipality. The Cidlina River, which is included in the name of the municipality, flows east of the village, outside the municipal territory.

== History ==
The first written mention of Lužec nad Cidlinou is from 1325. Important owners of the village included the Lords of Landštejn, the Lords of Postupim, the Pernštejn family and the Kinsky family.

== Demographics ==
Historical population

| Year | Pop. | ±% |
|---|---|---|
| 1869 | 993 | — |
| 1880 | 1,072 | +8.0% |
| 1890 | 1,085 | +1.2% |
| 1900 | 1,044 | −3.8% |
| 1910 | 1,067 | +2.2% |

| Year | Pop. | ±% |
|---|---|---|
| 1921 | 1,040 | −2.5% |
| 1930 | 1,053 | +1.2% |
| 1950 | 778 | −26.1% |
| 1961 | 784 | +0.8% |
| 1970 | 678 | −13.5% |

| Year | Pop. | ±% |
|---|---|---|
| 1980 | 625 | −7.8% |
| 1991 | 555 | −11.2% |
| 2001 | 504 | −9.2% |
| 2011 | 505 | +0.2% |
| 2021 | 492 | −2.6% |

Source: Censuses

== Transport ==
There are no railways or major roads passing through the municipality.

== Sights ==
The only protected cultural monument in Lužec nad Cidlinou is a statue of Saint Leonard, which originally stood in the monastery garden of Loreta in Chlumec nad Cidlinou. It dates from the 18th century.

The main landmark of the village is the Church of Saint George, built in 1872. Other sights include Chapel of the Virgin Mary, Memorial to the Victims of World War I from 1928 and Memorial of Jan Hus from 1931.
