= Choťovice =

- Municipality
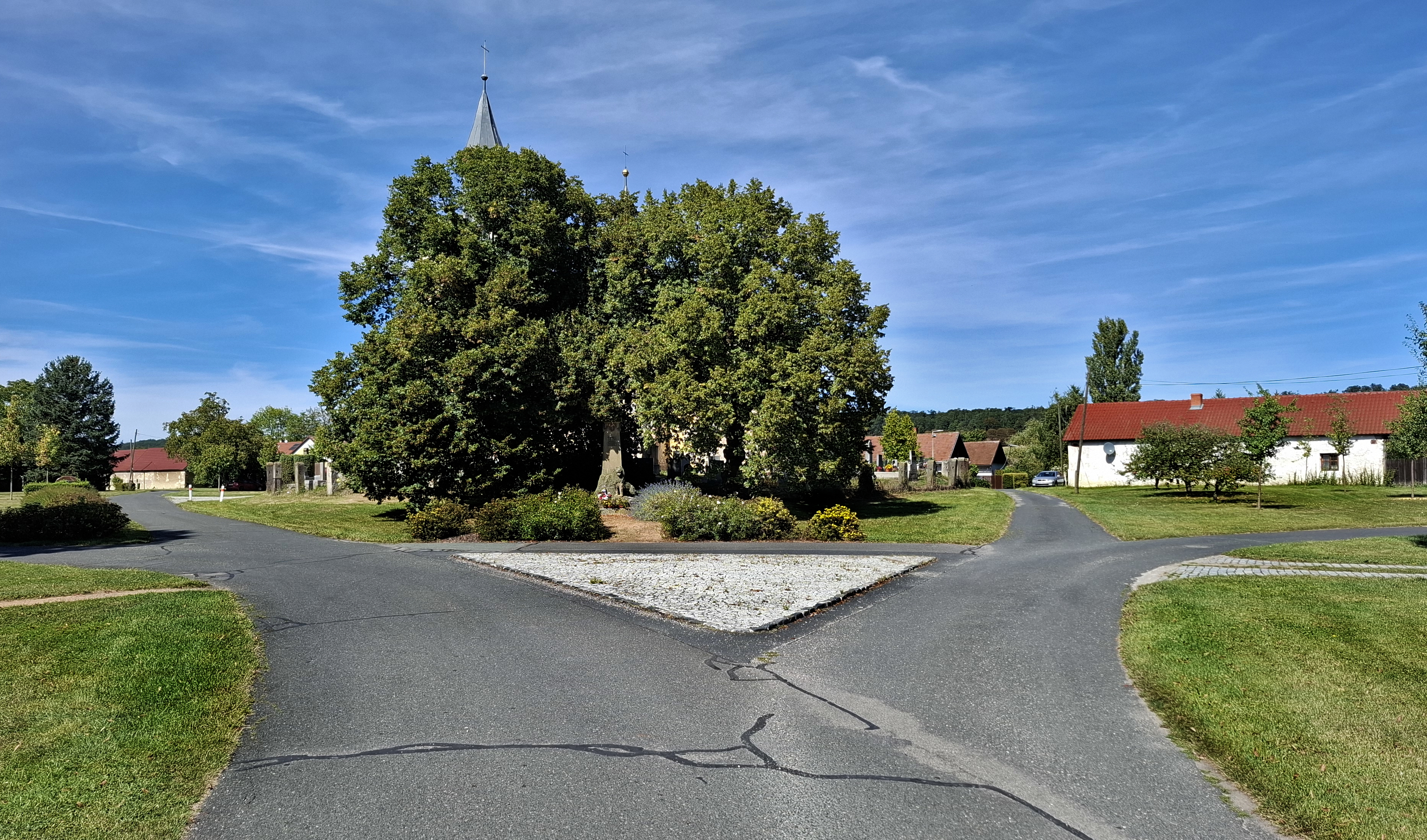
- Centre of Choťovice

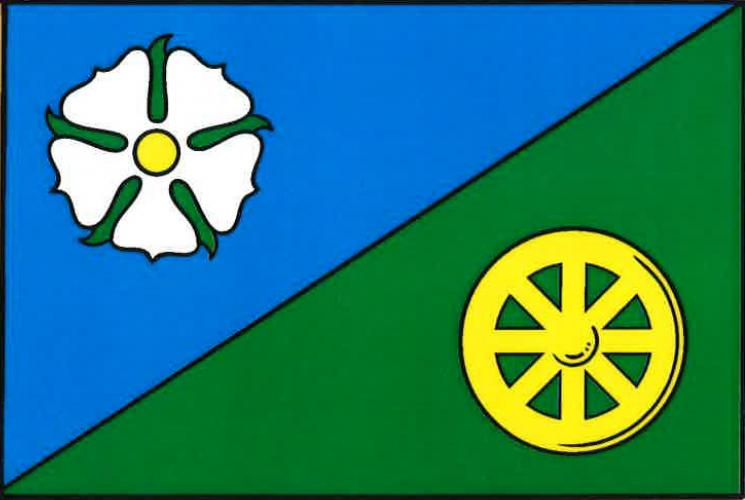
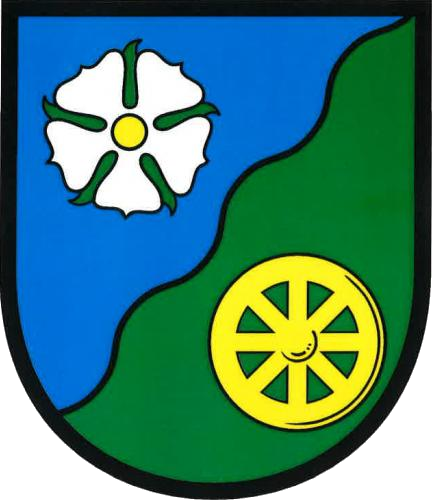
- Flag Coat of arms

- Location in the Czech Republic
- Coordinates: 50°8′33″N 15°19′11″E
- Country: Czech Republic
- Region: Central Bohemian
- District: Kolín
- First mentioned: 1357

Area
  - Total: 9.06 km^{2} (3.50 sq mi)
- Elevation: 204 m (669 ft)

Population (2026-01-01)
  - Total: 257
  - Density: 28.4/km^{2} (73.5/sq mi)
- Time zone: UTC+1 (CET)
  - Summer (DST): UTC+2 (CEST)
- Postal code: 289 05
- Website: www.obec-chotovice.cz

Choťovice is a municipality and village in Kolín District in the Central Bohemian Region of the Czech Republic. It has about 300 inhabitants.

== Etymology ==
The initial name of the village was Chotějovice. The name was derived from the personal name Chotěj, meaning "the village of Chotěj's people". Since the 17th century, the name Choťovice has been used.

== Geography ==
Choťovice is located about 15 kilometres (9 mi) northeast of Kolín and 33 km (21 mi) northwest of Pardubice. It lies in a predominantly flat and agricultural landscape, on the border between the Central Elbe Table and East Elbe Table. The highest point is at 237 m (778 ft) above sea level. The village is situated on the shore of the fishpond Žehuňský rybník, constructed on the Cidlina River. However, the fishpond is located outside the municipal territory. The river's artificial channel Žehuňský náhon flows through the village.

== History ==
The first written mention of Choťovice is from 1357. However, a fortress had stood here since 1345. After 1414, the village was annexed to the Žiželice/Hradišťko estate.

== Demographics ==
Historical population

Year	Pop.	±%
1869	482	—
1880	540	+12.0%
1890	502	−7.0%
1900	539	+7.4%
1910	613	+13.7%

Year	Pop.	±%
1921	591	−3.6%
1930	517	−12.5%
1950	379	−26.7%
1961	372	−1.8%
1970	300	−19.4%

Year	Pop.	±%
1980	244	−18.7%
1991	200	−18.0%
2001	172	−14.0%
2011	212	+23.3%
2021	219	+3.3%

Source: Censuses

== Transport ==
The D11 motorway (part of the European route E67) from Prague to Hradec Králové runs through the southern part of the municipality.

== Sights ==
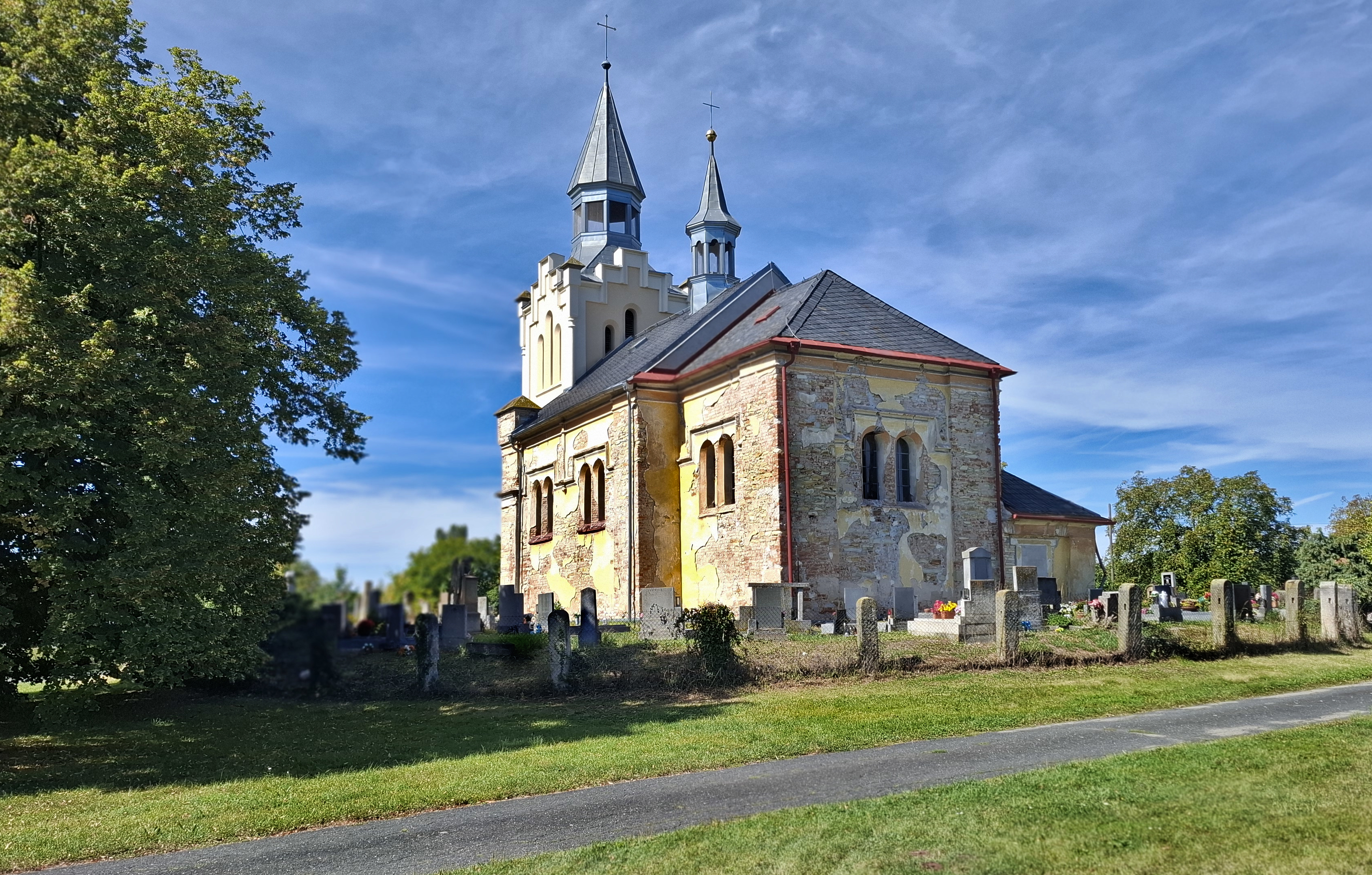
Church of the Nativity of the Virgin Mary

The main landmark of Choťovice is the Church of the Nativity of the Virgin Mary. Originally a Baroque church from 1670, it was completely rebuilt in the Historicist style in 1860 and the tower was added.
