= Dobšice =

Dobšice may refer to places in the Czech Republic:

- Dobšice (České Budějovice District), a municipality and village in the South Bohemian Region
- Dobšice (Nymburk District), a municipality and village in the Central Bohemian Region
- Dobšice (Znojmo District), a municipality and village in the South Moravian Region
- Dobšice, a village and part of Bezdědovice in the South Bohemian Region
- Dobšice, a village and part of Libošovice in the Hradec Králové Region
