= Sany (disambiguation) =

Sany is a Chinese heavy construction equipment manufacturer.

Sany may also refer to:

- Sány, a village and municipality in the Czech Republic
- Sany Joseph, Indian athlete
