= Sány =

- Municipality
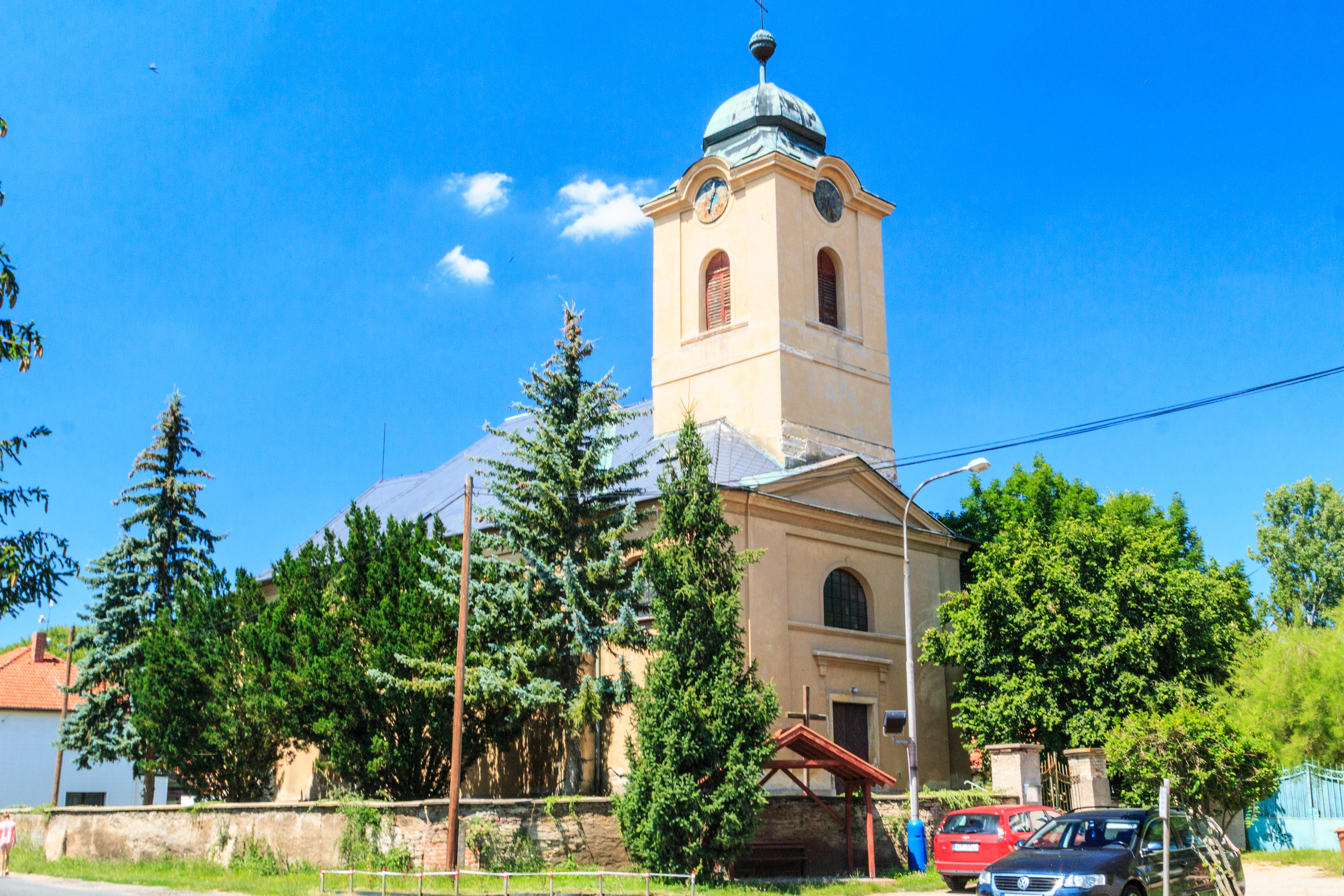
- Church of Saint Andrew

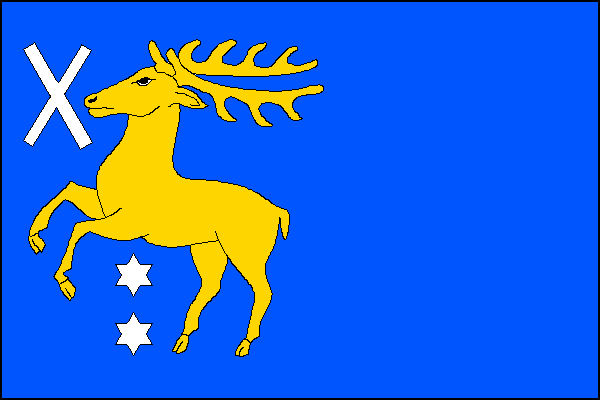
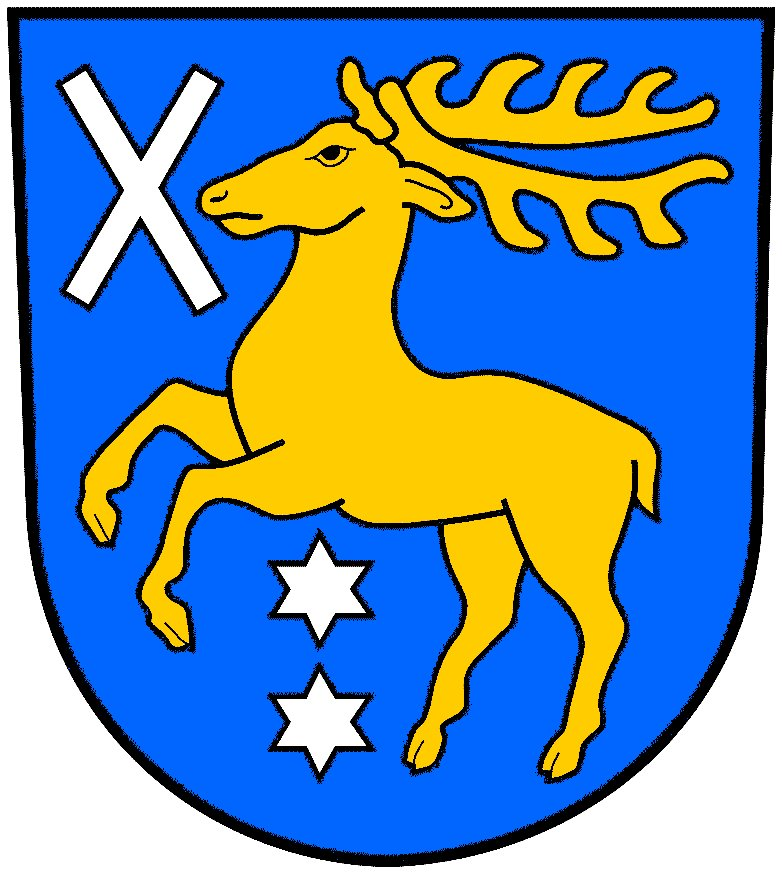
- Flag Coat of arms

- Location in the Czech Republic
- Coordinates: 50°7′29″N 15°14′52″E
- Country: Czech Republic
- Region: Central Bohemian
- District: Nymburk
- First mentioned: 1352

Area
  - Total: 9.48 km^{2} (3.66 sq mi)
- Elevation: 196 m (643 ft)

Population (2026-01-01)
  - Total: 617
  - Density: 65.1/km^{2} (169/sq mi)
- Time zone: UTC+1 (CET)
  - Summer (DST): UTC+2 (CEST)
- Postal code: 289 06
- Website: www.obecsany.cz

Sány is a municipality and village in Nymburk District in the Central Bohemian Region of the Czech Republic. It has about 600 inhabitants.

== Etymology ==
There are two theories about the origin of the name Sány. According to the first theory, the name was derived from the Czech word saň ('dragon') and could refer to the nature of the inhabitants. According to the second theory, the name was derived from the Czech word saně ('sled') and could refer to the shape of the village.

== Geography ==
Sány is located about 16 kilometres (10 mi) southeast of Nymburk and 50 km (31 mi) east of Prague. It lies in a flat and mostly agricultural landscape in the Central Elbe Table. The municipality is situated on the left bank of the Cidlina River.

== History ==
The first written mention of Sány is from 1352, when it was listed as property of the monastery in Mnichovo Hradiště.

== Demographics ==
Historical population

Year	Pop.	±%
1869	613	—
1880	732	+19.4%
1890	698	−4.6%
1900	732	+4.9%
1910	819	+11.9%

Year	Pop.	±%
1921	832	+1.6%
1930	821	−1.3%
1950	658	−19.9%
1961	621	−5.6%
1970	610	−1.8%

Year	Pop.	±%
1980	531	−13.0%
1991	466	−12.2%
2001	437	−6.2%
2011	475	+8.7%
2021	559	+17.7%

Source: Censuses

== Transport ==
The D11 motorway (part of the European route E67) from Prague to Hradec Králové runs through the municipality.

The railway line Kolín–Trutnov passes through the municipal territory, but the station named Sány is located in neighbouring Opolánky.

== Sights ==
There are no protected cultural monuments in the municipality. The main landmark of Sány is the Church of Saint Andrew. It is a modern Empire church built in 1827, after the old local Gothic church was demolished in 1824.

== Notable people ==
- Jan Čapek of Sány (c. 1390 – c. 1452), nobleman and military officer
