= Žiželice (Kolín District) =

- Municipality
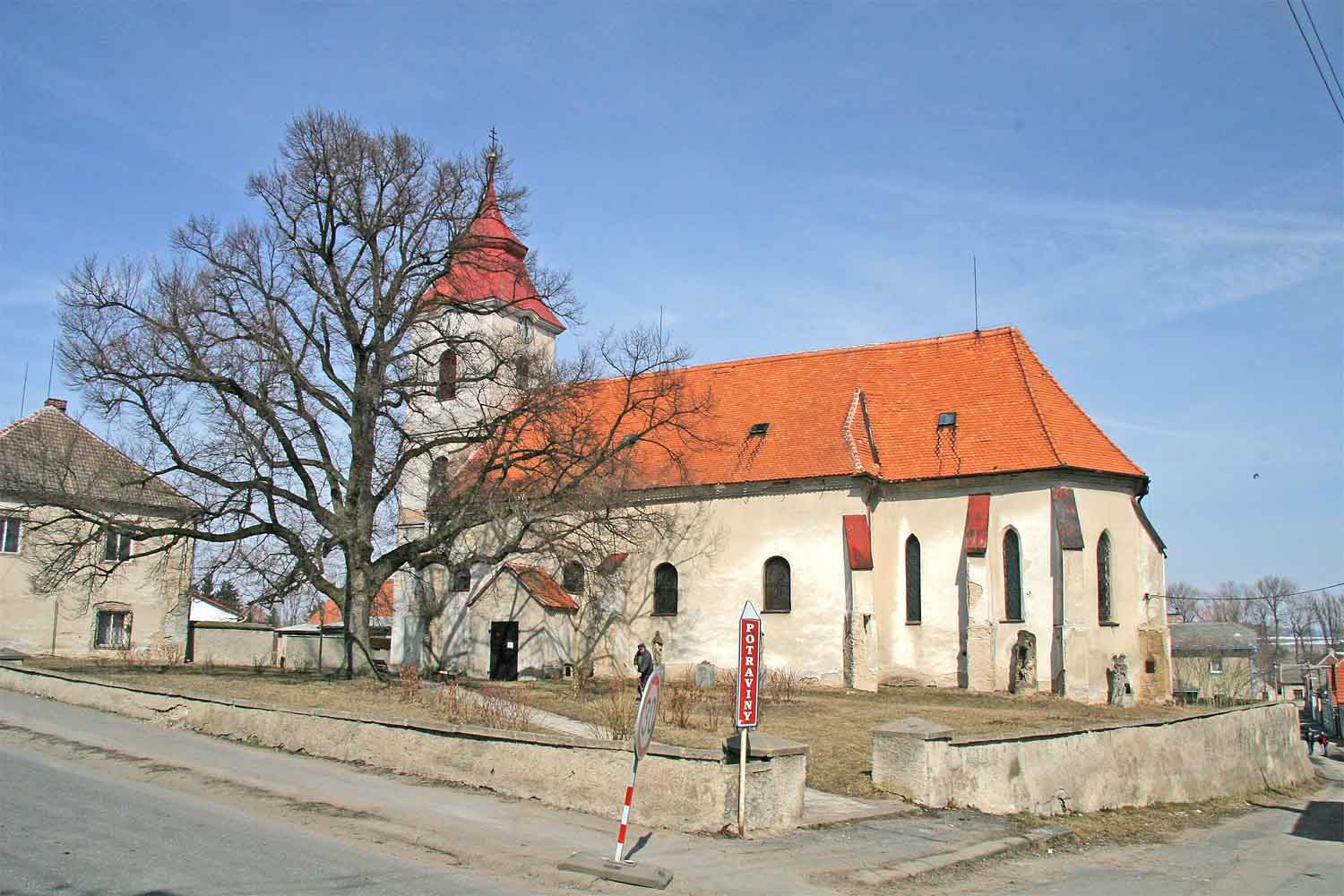
- Church of Saint Procopius with a protected small-leaved linden

- Location in the Czech Republic
- Coordinates: 50°7′55″N 15°23′36″E
- Country: Czech Republic
- Region: Central Bohemian
- District: Kolín
- First mentioned: 1052

Area
  - Total: 18.61 km^{2} (7.19 sq mi)
- Elevation: 211 m (692 ft)

Population (2026-01-01)
  - Total: 2,002
  - Density: 107.6/km^{2} (278.6/sq mi)
- Time zone: UTC+1 (CET)
  - Summer (DST): UTC+2 (CEST)
- Postal codes: 281 26, 281 29
- Website: www.zizelice.cz

Žiželice is a municipality and village in Kolín District in the Central Bohemian Region of the Czech Republic. It has about 2,000 inhabitants. The municipality is located on the Cidlina River in the East Elbe Table.

== Administrative division ==
Žiželice consists of seven municipal parts (in brackets population according to the 2021 census):

- Žiželice (864)
- Hradišťko II (152)
- Končice (405)
- Kundratice (36)
- Loukonosy (151)
- Pod Vinicí (78)
- Zbraň (10)

== Etymology ==
The initial name of Žiželice was Žuželice. The name was derived from the personal name Žužel, meaning "the village of Žužel's people".

== Geography ==
Žiželice is located about 17 kilometres (11 mi) northeast of Kolín and 28 km (17 mi) northwest of Pardubice. It lies in a flat and predominantly agricultural landscape in the East Elbe Table. The highest point is at 248 m (814 ft) above sea level. The Cidlina River flows through the municipality.

== History ==
The first written mention of Žiželice is from 1052, when there was already a church and the village served as a market centre. In 1321, the then owner of Žiželice, Lord Dětoch, founded a new village called Žiželice next to the old village and renamed the old village Končice. From the 14th century, the estate was owned by the Rosenberg family. Peter I of Rosenberg had demolished the old wooden church in 1347 and had built a new one. During the Hussite Wars in 1425, the village was burned down, but soon was restored.

The Hradišťko Castle (in what is today known as Hradišťko II) was first documented in 1299. It served as the administrative centre of the Žiželice estate. From 1439 to 1493, the castle and the estate belonged to the Waldstein family. From 1493 to 1517, it was a royal property. During this time, the castle lost its importance and began to fall into disrepair. After 1517, the owners changed frequently, until in 1547 the estate was sold again to the royal chamber and annexed to the Chlumec estate. The castle was an abandoned ruin in 1571 and had almost disappeared by 1670. Today, only landscaping is visible at the castle site.

At the end of the Thirty Years' War, Žiželice was burned down again.

In the 19th century, the railway was built and Žiželice was industrialised. There used to be a sugar factory and a textile factory.

== Demographics ==
Historical population

Year	Pop.	±%
1869	3,031	—
1880	3,318	+9.5%
1890	3,040	−8.4%
1900	3,350	+10.2%
1910	3,070	−8.4%

Year	Pop.	±%
1921	2,809	−8.5%
1930	2,660	−5.3%
1950	2,036	−23.5%
1961	1,977	−2.9%
1970	1,774	−10.3%

Year	Pop.	±%
1980	1,596	−10.0%
1991	1,367	−14.3%
2001	1,297	−5.1%
2011	1,580	+21.8%
2021	1,696	+7.3%

Source: Censuses

== Transport ==
The D11 motorway (part of the European route E67) from Prague to Hradec Králové runs through the municipality.

== Sights ==
The main landmark of Žiželice is the Church of Saint Procopius. It was built in the Gothic style after 1347 and modified in 1712. After being damaged by a fire in 1830, the church was reconstructed and its early Baroque equipment was replaced with a new one.
