= Opolany =

- Municipality
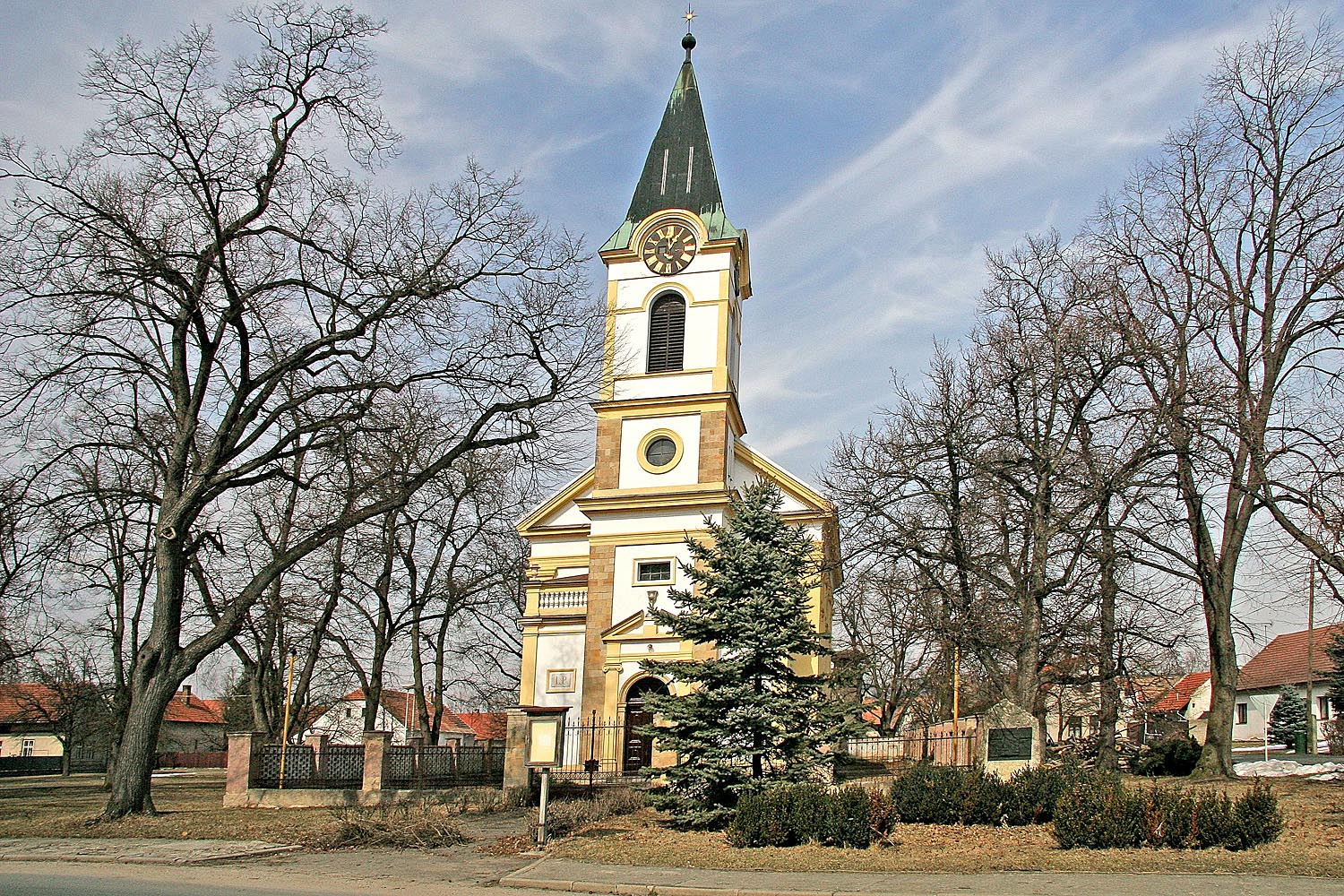
- Evangelical church

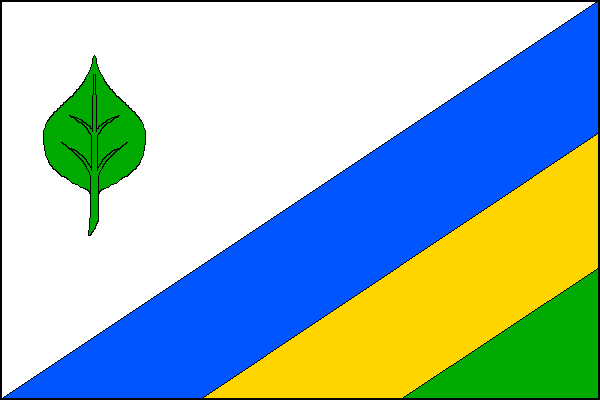
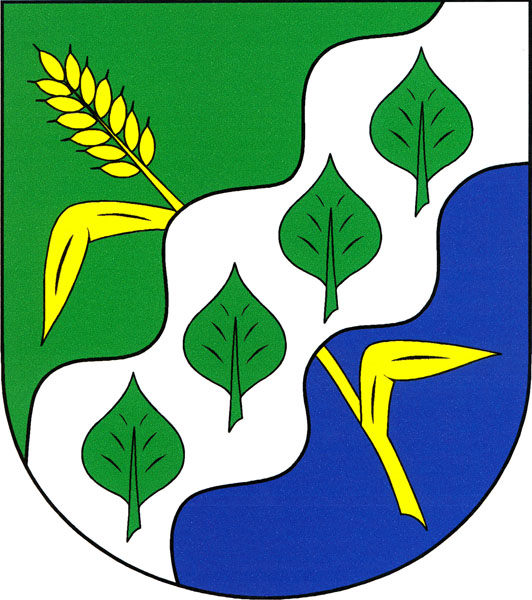
- Flag Coat of arms

- Location in the Czech Republic
- Coordinates: 50°7′51″N 15°13′1″E
- Country: Czech Republic
- Region: Central Bohemian
- District: Nymburk
- First mentioned: 1228

Area
  - Total: 12.21 km^{2} (4.71 sq mi)
- Elevation: 195 m (640 ft)

Population (2026-01-01)
  - Total: 940
  - Density: 77/km^{2} (200/sq mi)
- Time zone: UTC+1 (CET)
  - Summer (DST): UTC+2 (CEST)
- Postal codes: 289 06, 289 07
- Website: www.opolany.cz

Opolany is a municipality and village in Nymburk District in the Central Bohemian Region of the Czech Republic. It has about 900 inhabitants. It lies on the Cidlina River.

== Administrative division ==
Opolany consists of four municipal parts (in brackets population according to the 2021 census):

- Opolany (439)
- Kanín (215)
- Opolánky (167)
- Oškobrh (83)

== Etymology ==
The initial name of Opolany was Opoleli. The name was derived from the Old Czech verb opoleti, meaning 'to burn' ('to destroy with fire on the surface'). After the verb fell out of use, the name was corrupted to Opolany. The form Opolany was first documented in 1487.

== Geography ==
Opolany is located about 14 kilometres (9 mi) southeast of Nymburk and 48 km (30 mi) east of Prague. It lies in a flat and mostly agricultural landscape in the Central Elbe Table. The highest point is the hill Oškobrh at 285 m (935 ft) above sea level. The Cidlina River flows through the municipality.

== History ==
The first written mention of Opolany is from 1228, when it was listed as a property of the St. George's Convent in Prague. After the Hussite Wars, the village was annexed to the Poděbrady estate. From 1487 until the establishment of an independent municipality in 1850, it was part of the Kolín estate and shared its owners.

== Demographics ==
Historical population

Year	Pop.	±%
1869	1,225	—
1880	1,385	+13.1%
1890	1,386	+0.1%
1900	1,478	+6.6%
1910	1,530	+3.5%

Year	Pop.	±%
1921	1,580	+3.3%
1930	1,477	−6.5%
1950	1,226	−17.0%
1961	1,210	−1.3%
1970	1,130	−6.6%

Year	Pop.	±%
1980	1,048	−7.3%
1991	838	−20.0%
2001	801	−4.4%
2011	872	+8.9%
2021	904	+3.7%

Source: Censuses

== Transport ==
The D11 motorway (part of the European route E67) from Prague to Hradec Králové runs through the municipality.

The railway line Kolín–Trutnov passes through the municipal territory. Opolany is served by the station named Sány, located in Opolánky.

== Sights ==
The main landmark of Opolany is the Evangelical church. It was built in 1893.
