= Žehuň =

- Municipality
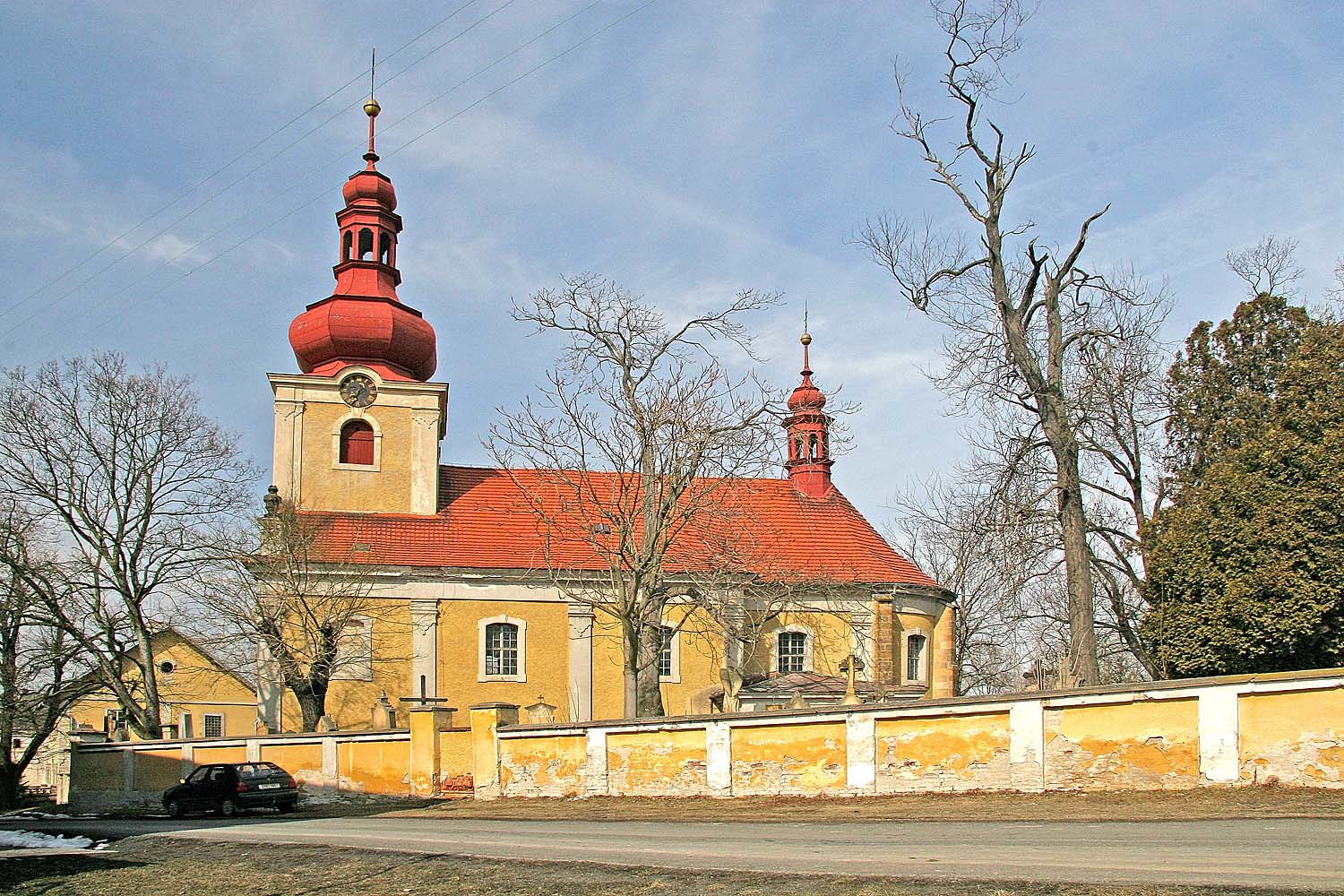
- Church of Saint Gotthard

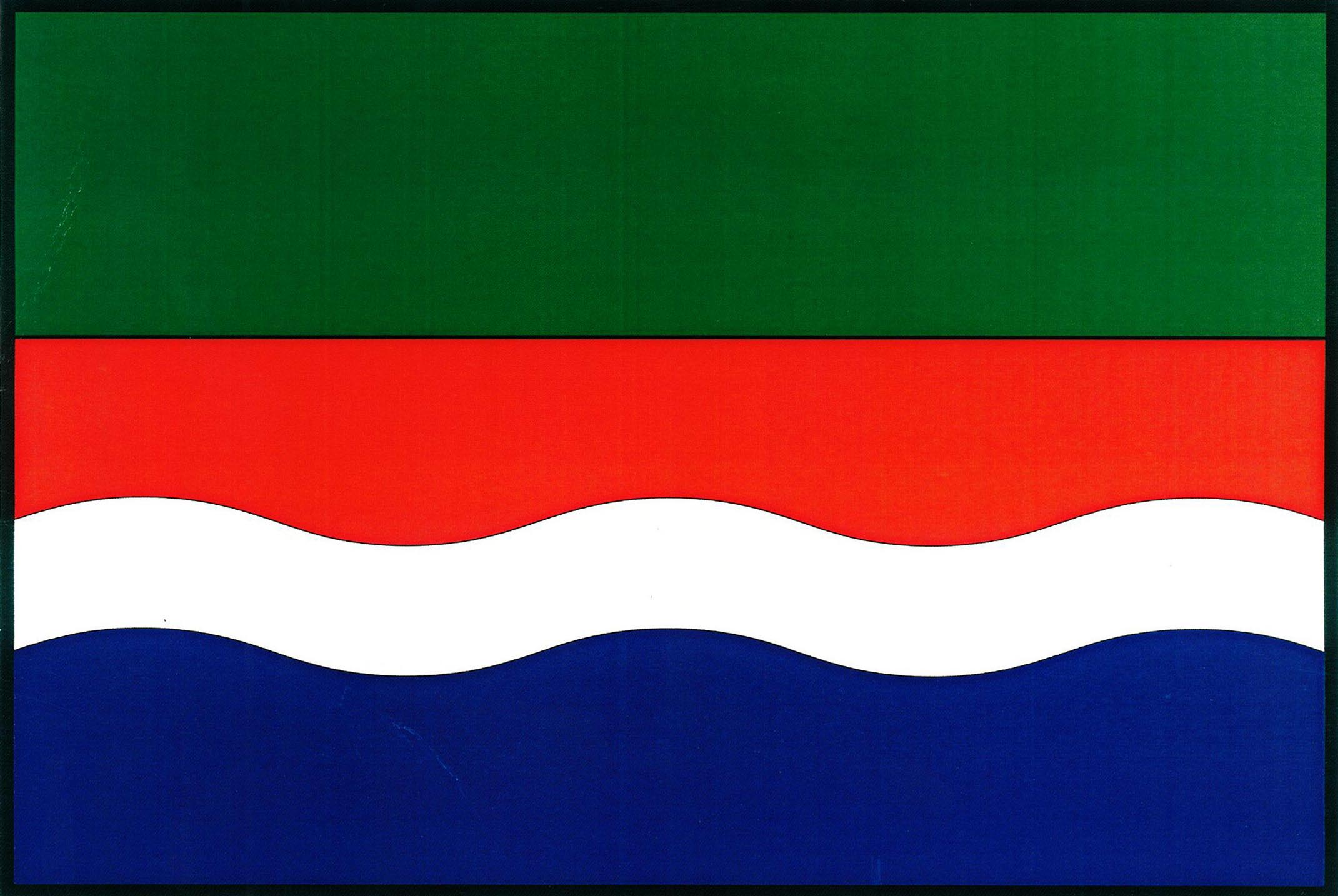
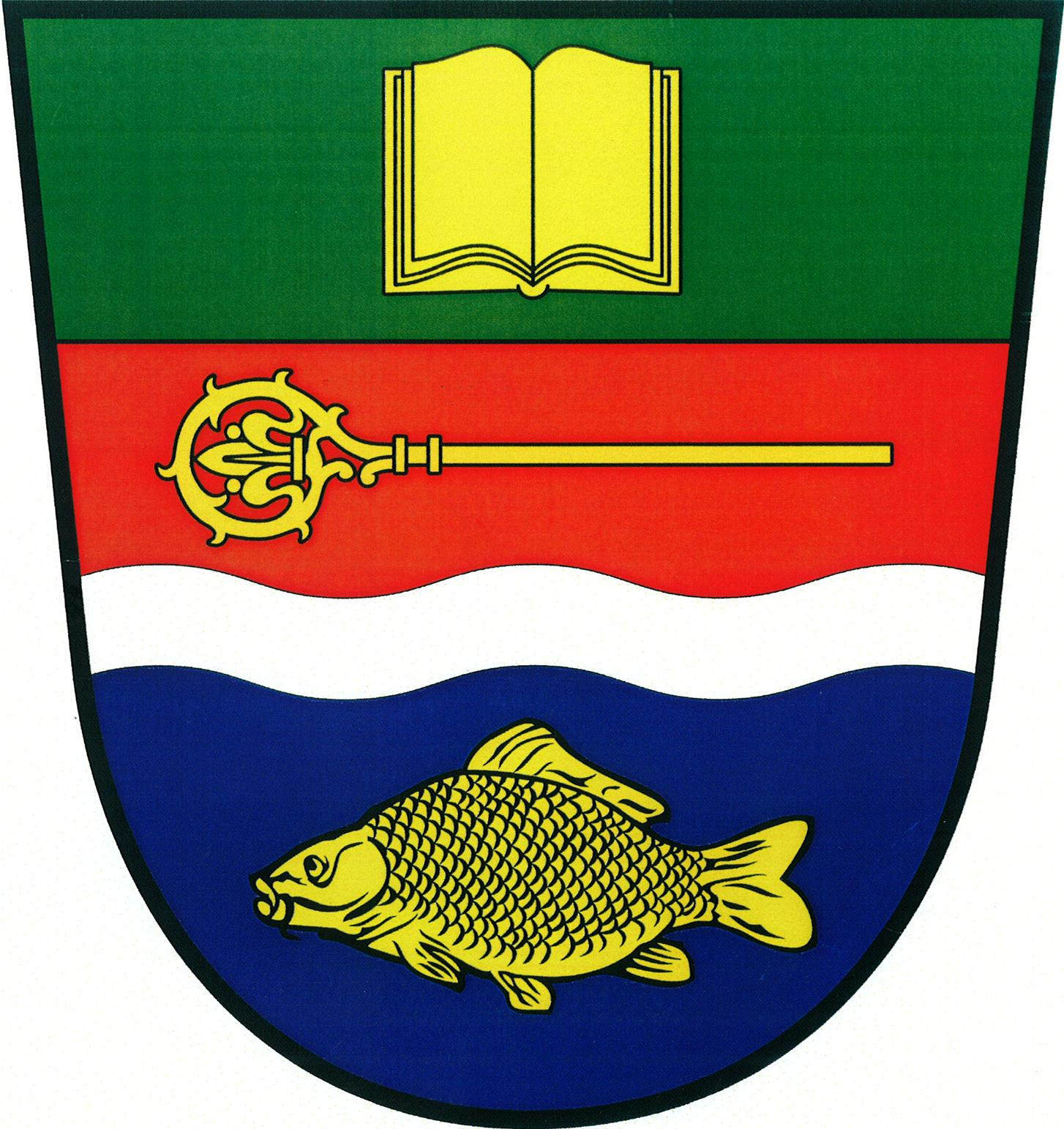
- Flag Coat of arms

- Location in the Czech Republic
- Coordinates: 50°8′8″N 15°17′29″E
- Country: Czech Republic
- Region: Central Bohemian
- District: Kolín
- First mentioned: 1137

Area
  - Total: 9.12 km^{2} (3.52 sq mi)
- Elevation: 204 m (669 ft)

Population (2026-01-01)
  - Total: 444
  - Density: 48.7/km^{2} (126/sq mi)
- Time zone: UTC+1 (CET)
  - Summer (DST): UTC+2 (CEST)
- Postal code: 289 05
- Website: www.zehun.cz

Žehuň is a municipality and village in Kolín District in the Central Bohemian Region of the Czech Republic. It has about 400 inhabitants.

== Demographics ==
Historical population
| Year | Pop. | ±% |
|---|---|---|
| 1869 | 761 | — |
| 1880 | 876 | +15.1% |
| 1890 | 891 | +1.7% |
| 1900 | 925 | +3.8% |
| 1910 | 982 | +6.2% |
| 1921 | 936 | −4.7% |
| 1930 | 838 | −10.5% |
| 1950 | 683 | −18.5% |
| 1961 | 651 | −4.7% |
| 1970 | 608 | −6.6% |
| 1980 | 523 | −14.0% |
| 1991 | 467 | −10.7% |
| 2001 | 438 | −6.2% |
| 2011 | 430 | −1.8% |
| 2021 | 447 | +4.0% |
Source: Censuses
