= Žeretice =

- Municipality
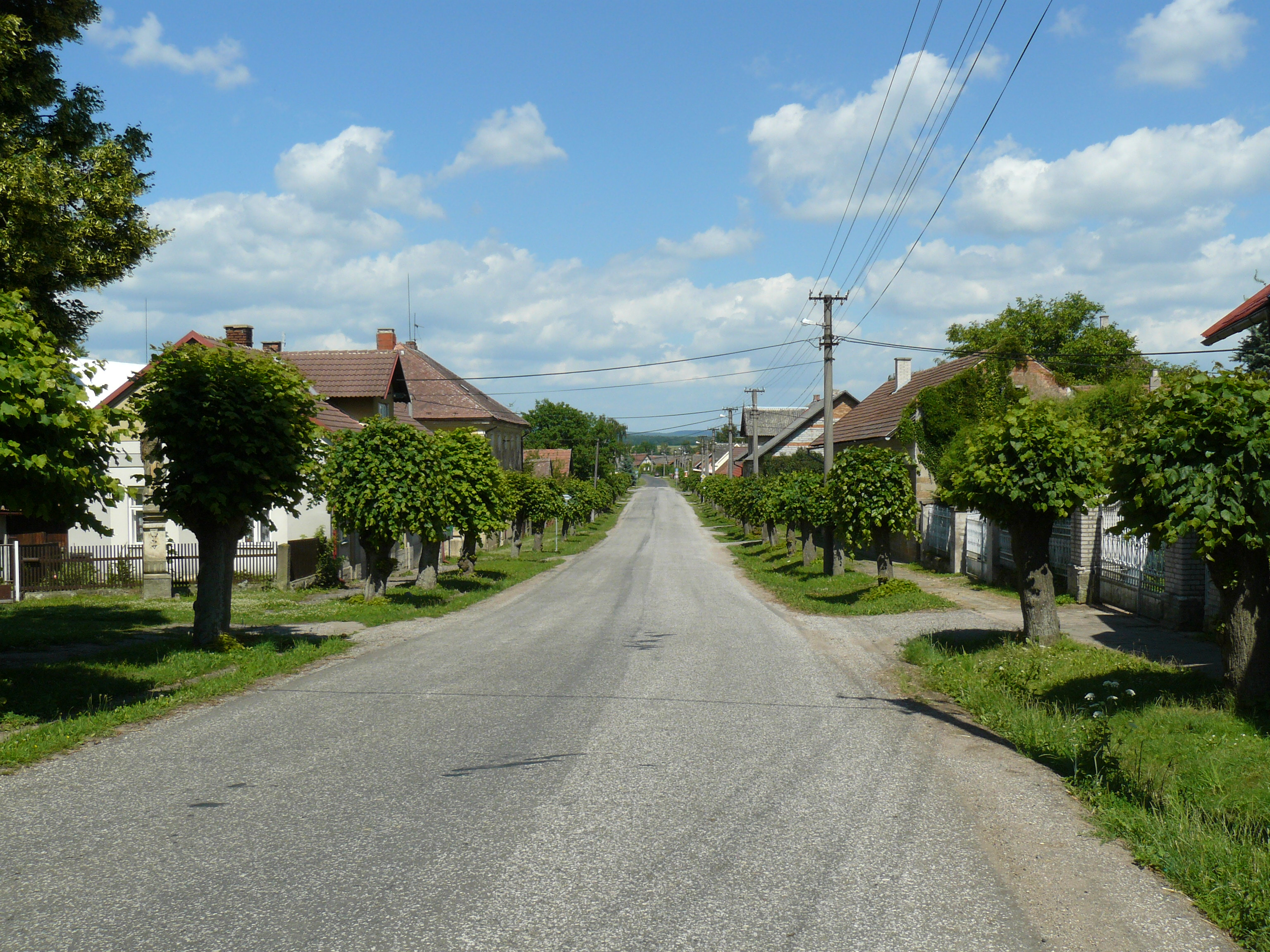
- Main street

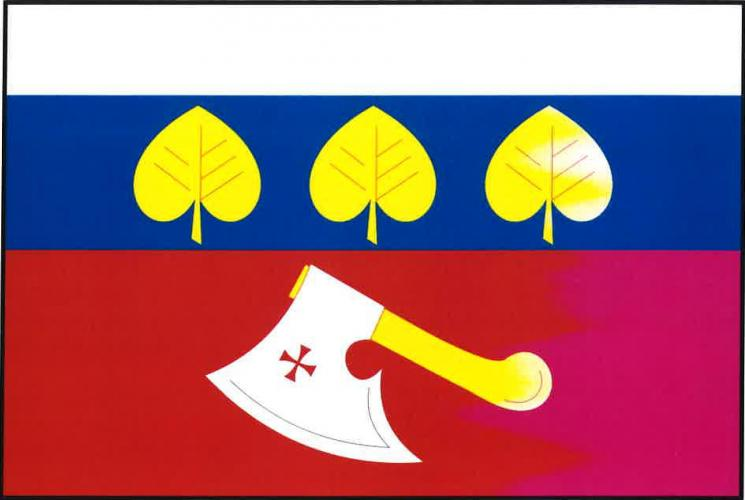
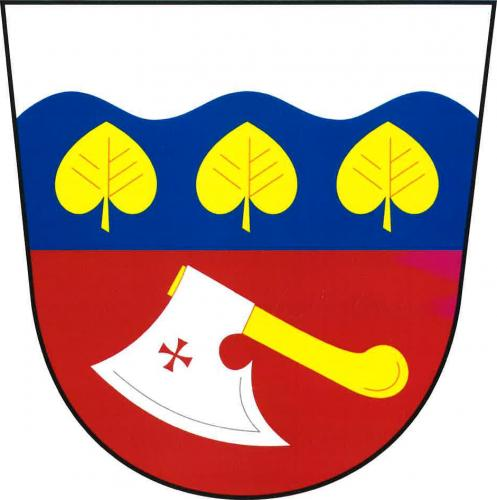
- Flag Coat of arms

- Location in the Czech Republic
- Coordinates: 50°21′13″N 15°24′43″E
- Country: Czech Republic
- Region: Hradec Králové
- District: Jičín
- First mentioned: 1350

Area
  - Total: 7.69 km^{2} (2.97 sq mi)
- Elevation: 252 m (827 ft)

Population (2026-01-01)
  - Total: 243
  - Density: 31.6/km^{2} (81.8/sq mi)
- Time zone: UTC+1 (CET)
  - Summer (DST): UTC+2 (CEST)
- Postal codes: 507 02, 507 03
- Website: www.zeretice.org

Žeretice is a municipality and village in Jičín District in the Hradec Králové Region of the Czech Republic. It has about 200 inhabitants.

== Administrative division ==
Žeretice consists of three municipal parts (in brackets population according to the 2021 census):

- Žeretice (207)
- Hradíšťko (33)
- Vlhošť (19)

== Demographics ==
Historical population
Year	Pop.	±%
1869	1,170	—
1880	1,110	−5.1%
1890	1,090	−1.8%
1900	875	−19.7%
1910	822	−6.1%
1921	759	−7.7%
1930	684	−9.9%
1950	485	−29.1%
1961	463	−4.5%
1970	395	−14.7%
1980	339	−14.2%
1991	325	−4.1%
2001	264	−18.8%
2011	251	−4.9%
2021	259	+3.2%
Source: Censuses
