= Slatiny =

- Municipality
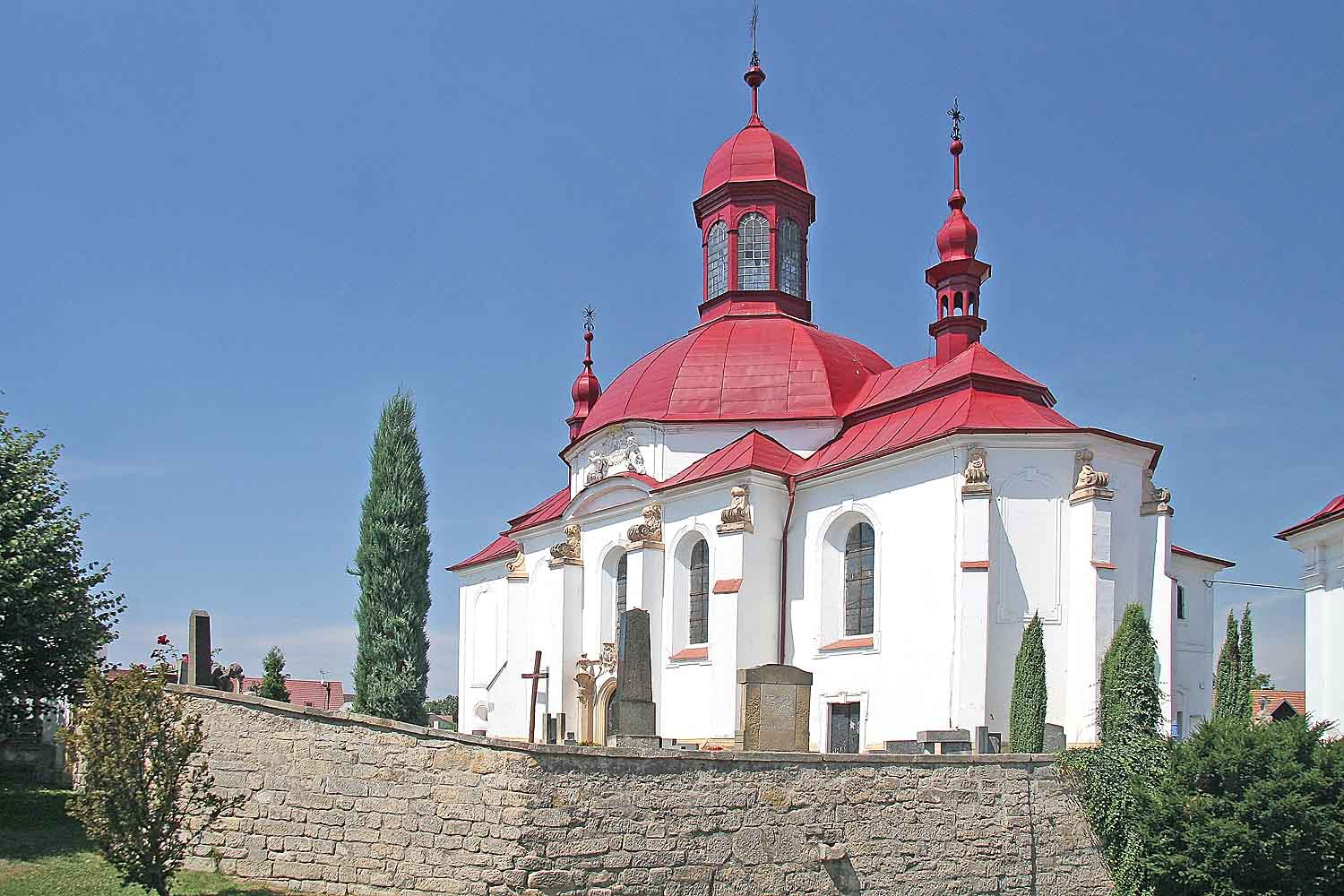
- Church of the Assumption of the Virgin Mary

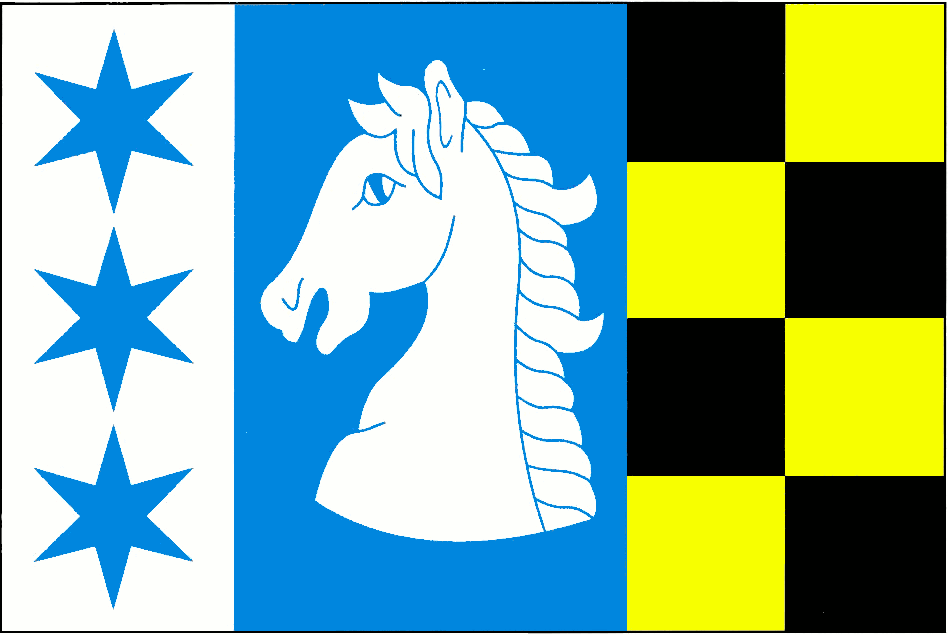
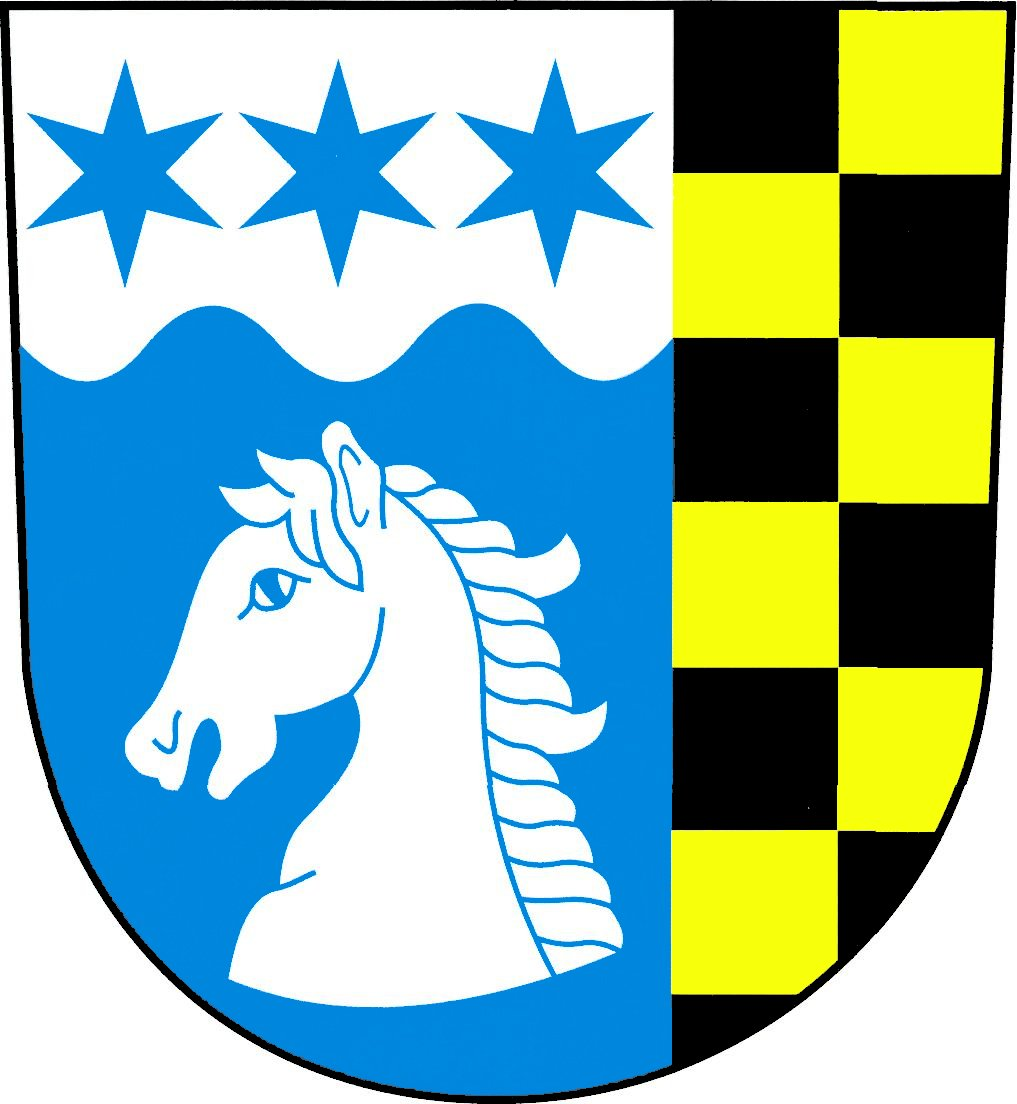
- Flag Coat of arms

- Location in the Czech Republic
- Coordinates: 50°22′0″N 15°22′53″E
- Country: Czech Republic
- Region: Hradec Králové
- District: Jičín
- First mentioned: 1357

Area
  - Total: 11.76 km^{2} (4.54 sq mi)
- Elevation: 268 m (879 ft)

Population (2026-01-01)
  - Total: 552
  - Density: 46.9/km^{2} (122/sq mi)
- Time zone: UTC+1 (CET)
  - Summer (DST): UTC+2 (CEST)
- Postal code: 506 01
- Website: www.slatiny.cz

Slatiny is a municipality and village in Jičín District in the Hradec Králové Region of the Czech Republic. It has about 600 inhabitants.

== Administrative division ==
Slatiny consists of two municipal parts (in brackets population according to the 2021 census):

- Slatiny (345)
- Milíčeves (199)

== Demographics ==
Historical population
Year	Pop.	±%
1869	1,236	—
1880	1,167	−5.6%
1890	1,101	−5.7%
1900	987	−10.4%
1910	1,043	+5.7%
1921	1,099	+5.4%
1930	1,003	−8.7%
1950	751	−25.1%
1961	714	−4.9%
1970	639	−10.5%
1980	604	−5.5%
1991	449	−25.7%
2001	556	+23.8%
2011	520	−6.5%
2021	544	+4.6%
Source: Censuses
