= Vitiněves =

- Municipality
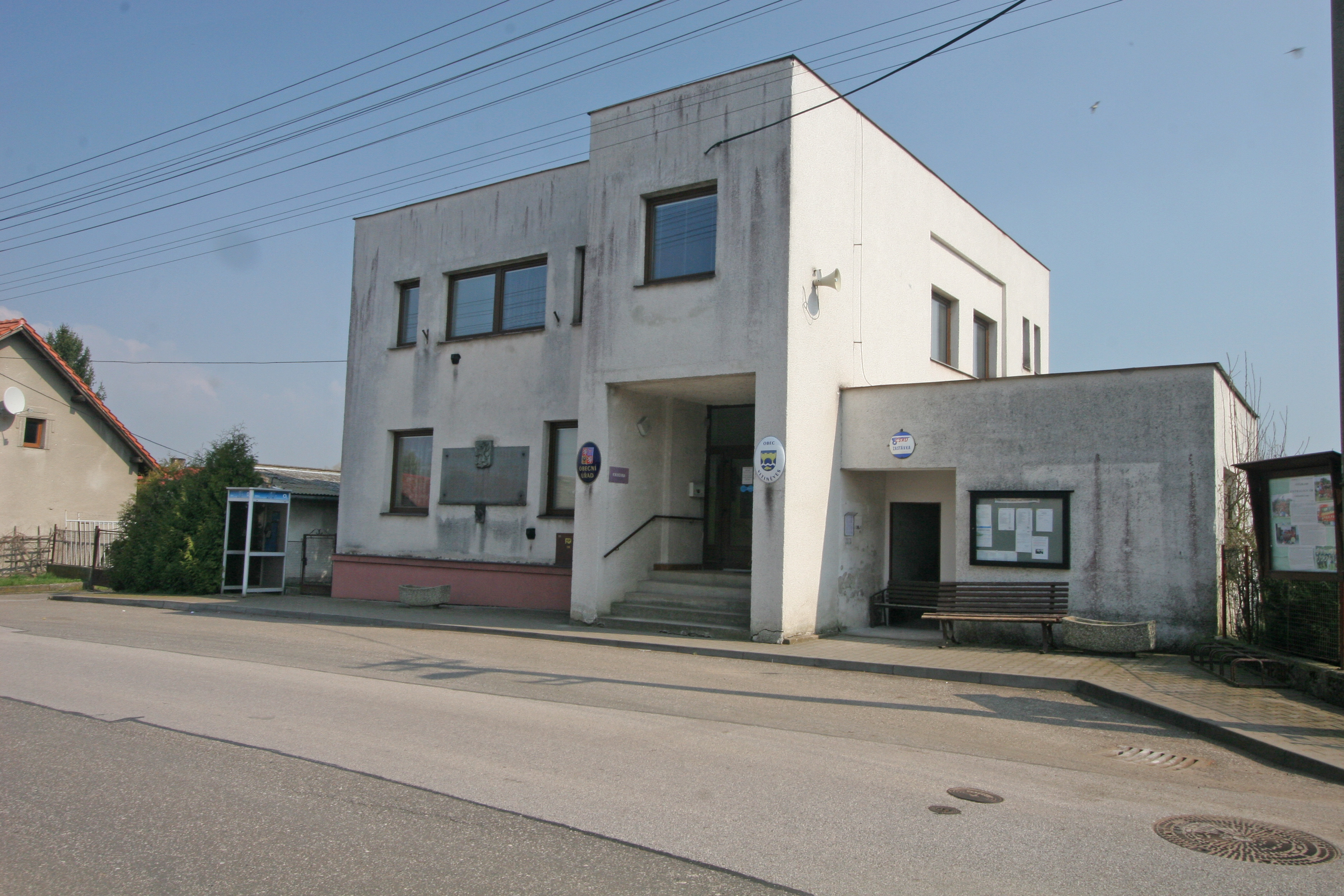
- Municipal office

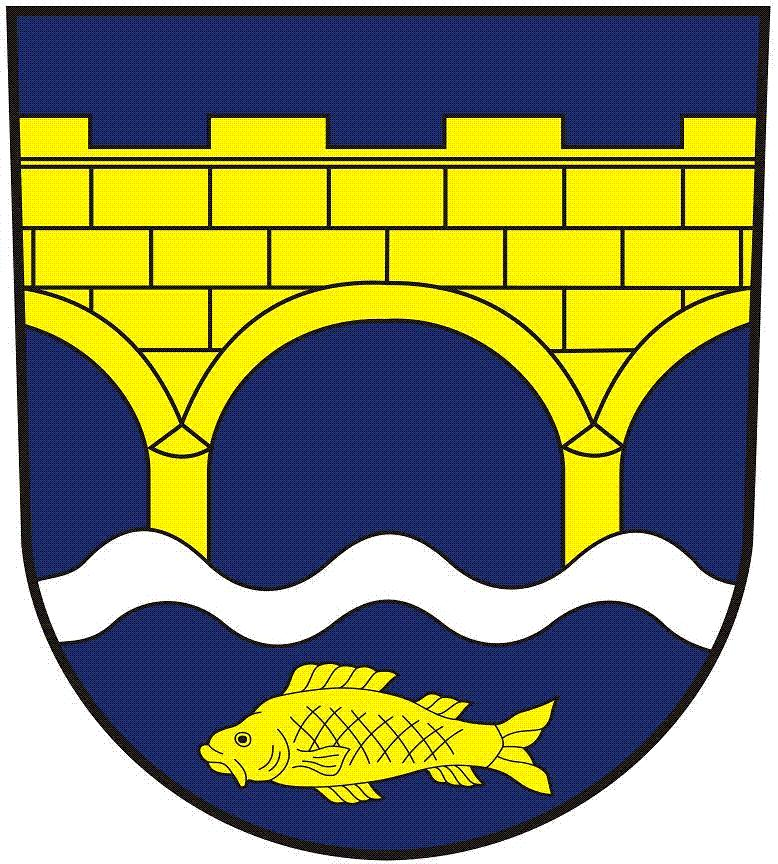
- Flag Coat of arms

- Location in the Czech Republic
- Coordinates: 50°23′36″N 15°22′42″E
- Country: Czech Republic
- Region: Hradec Králové
- District: Jičín
- First mentioned: 1345

Area
  - Total: 4.92 km^{2} (1.90 sq mi)
- Elevation: 262 m (860 ft)

Population (2026-01-01)
  - Total: 340
  - Density: 69/km^{2} (180/sq mi)
- Time zone: UTC+1 (CET)
  - Summer (DST): UTC+2 (CEST)
- Postal code: 506 01
- Website: www.vitineves.cz

Vitiněves is a municipality and village in Jičín District in the Hradec Králové Region of the Czech Republic. It has about 300 inhabitants.

== Demographics ==
Historical population
Year	Pop.	±%
1869	479	—
1880	517	+7.9%
1890	494	−4.4%
1900	489	−1.0%
1910	514	+5.1%
1921	465	−9.5%
1930	425	−8.6%
1950	353	−16.9%
1961	336	−4.8%
1970	322	−4.2%
1980	320	−0.6%
1991	304	−5.0%
2001	304	+0.0%
2011	332	+9.2%
2021	330	−0.6%
Source: Censuses
