= Skřivany =

- Municipality
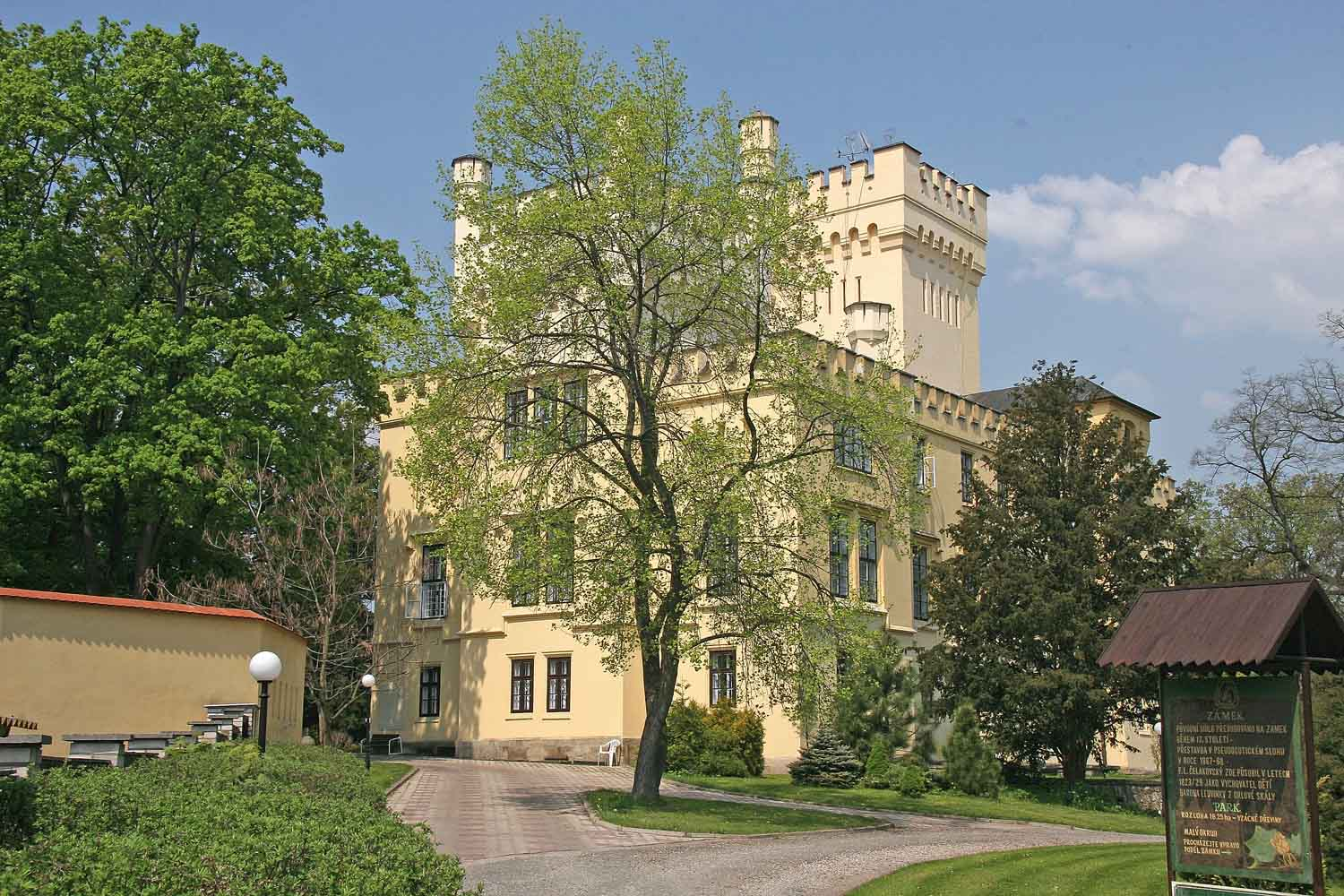
- Skřivany Castle

- Flag Coat of arms

- Location in the Czech Republic
- Coordinates: 50°16′8″N 15°30′4″E
- Country: Czech Republic
- Region: Hradec Králové
- District: Hradec Králové
- First mentioned: 1360

Area
  - Total: 6.51 km^{2} (2.51 sq mi)
- Elevation: 238 m (781 ft)

Population (2026-01-01)
  - Total: 1,145
  - Density: 176/km^{2} (456/sq mi)
- Time zone: UTC+1 (CET)
  - Summer (DST): UTC+2 (CEST)
- Postal code: 503 52
- Website: www.skrivany.cz

Skřivany is a municipality and village in Hradec Králové District in the Hradec Králové Region of the Czech Republic. It has about 1,100 inhabitants.

== Demographics ==
Historical population
Year	Pop.	±%
1869	604	—
1880	797	+32.0%
1890	936	+17.4%
1900	1,309	+39.9%
1910	1,323	+1.1%
1921	1,242	−6.1%
1930	1,246	+0.3%
1950	1,021	−18.1%
1961	1,118	+9.5%
1970	1,077	−3.7%
1980	997	−7.4%
1991	926	−7.1%
2001	1,029	+11.1%
2011	1,034	+0.5%
2021	1,064	+2.9%
Source: Censuses
