= Dobšice (České Budějovice District) =

- Municipality
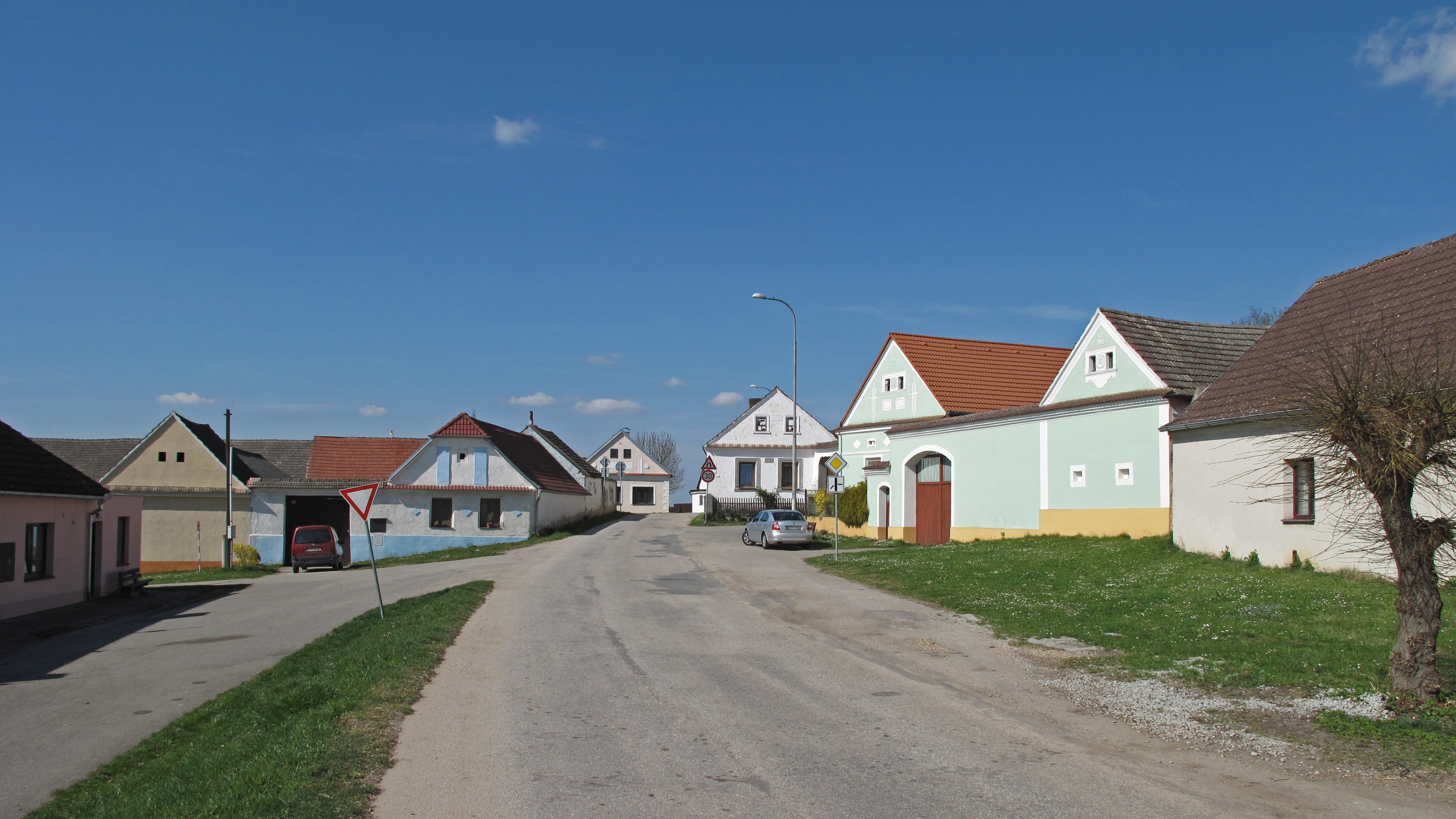
- Farm houses

- Location in the Czech Republic
- Coordinates: 49°12′58″N 14°29′2″E
- Country: Czech Republic
- Region: South Bohemian
- District: České Budějovice
- First mentioned: 1437

Area
  - Total: 4.34 km^{2} (1.68 sq mi)
- Elevation: 480 m (1,570 ft)

Population (2026-01-01)
  - Total: 141
  - Density: 32.5/km^{2} (84.1/sq mi)
- Time zone: UTC+1 (CET)
  - Summer (DST): UTC+2 (CEST)
- Postal code: 375 01
- Website: www.obecdobsice.cz

Dobšice is a municipality and village in České Budějovice District in the South Bohemian Region of the Czech Republic. It has about 100 inhabitants.

Dobšice lies approximately 27 kilometres (17 mi) north of České Budějovice and 97 km (60 mi) south of Prague.

== Demographics ==
Historical population
Year	Pop.	±%
1869	207	—
1880	187	−9.7%
1890	201	+7.5%
1900	213	+6.0%
1910	205	−3.8%
1921	195	−4.9%
1930	190	−2.6%
1950	119	−37.4%
1961	160	+34.5%
1970	132	−17.5%
1980	123	−6.8%
1991	116	−5.7%
2001	116	+0.0%
2011	103	−11.2%
2021	114	+10.7%
Source: Censuses
