= Mlékosrby =

- Municipality
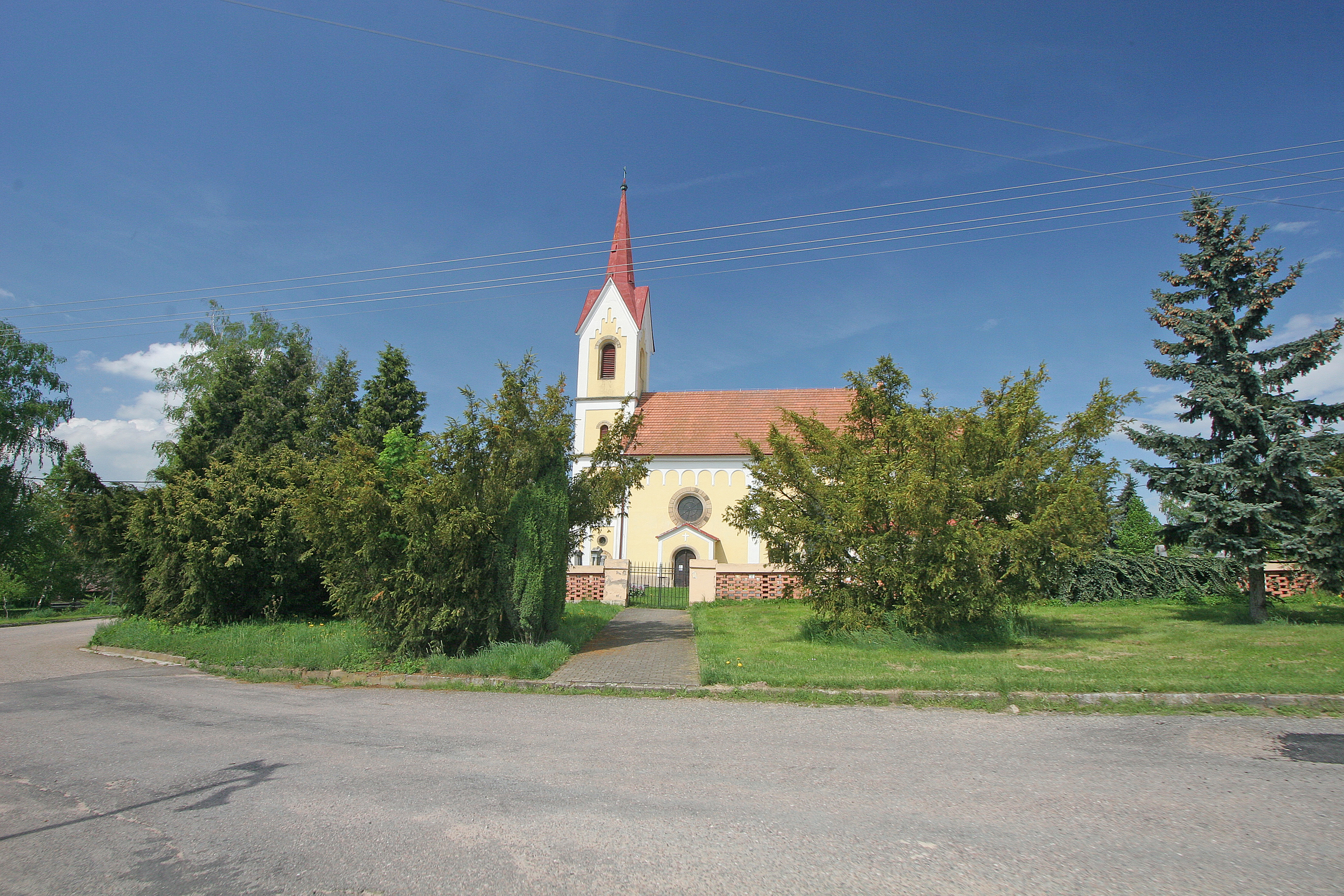
- Church of Saints Philip and James

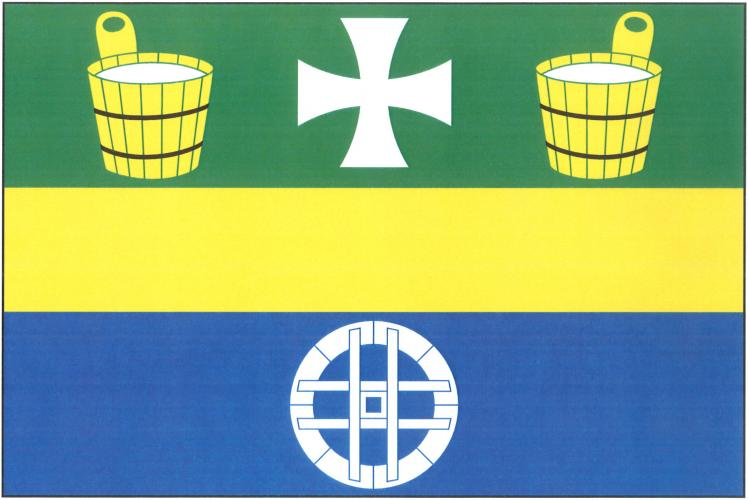
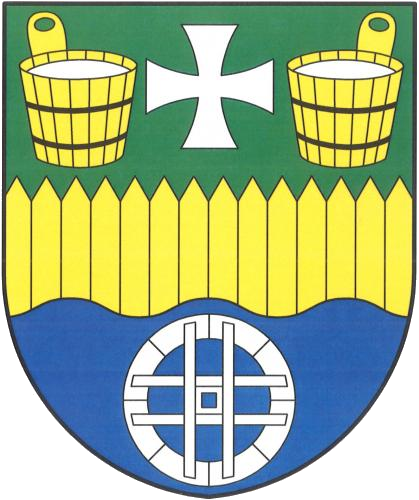
- Flag Coat of arms

- Location in the Czech Republic
- Coordinates: 50°11′30″N 15°30′6″E
- Country: Czech Republic
- Region: Hradec Králové
- District: Hradec Králové
- First mentioned: 1343

Area
  - Total: 5.82 km^{2} (2.25 sq mi)
- Elevation: 237 m (778 ft)

Population (2026-01-01)
  - Total: 247
  - Density: 42.4/km^{2} (110/sq mi)
- Time zone: UTC+1 (CET)
  - Summer (DST): UTC+2 (CEST)
- Postal code: 503 51
- Website: www.mlekosrby.cz

Mlékosrby is a municipality and village in Hradec Králové District in the Hradec Králové Region of the Czech Republic. It has about 200 inhabitants.

== Demographics ==
Historical population
Year	Pop.	±%
1869	426	—
1880	383	−10.1%
1890	399	+4.2%
1900	416	+4.3%
1910	405	−2.6%
1921	416	+2.7%
1930	444	+6.7%
1950	349	−21.4%
1961	341	−2.3%
1970	264	−22.6%
1980	251	−4.9%
1991	231	−8.0%
2001	222	−3.9%
2011	243	+9.5%
2021	224	−7.8%
Source: Censuses

== Notable people ==
- František Kloz (1905–1945), footballer
