= Olešnice (Hradec Králové District) =

- Municipality
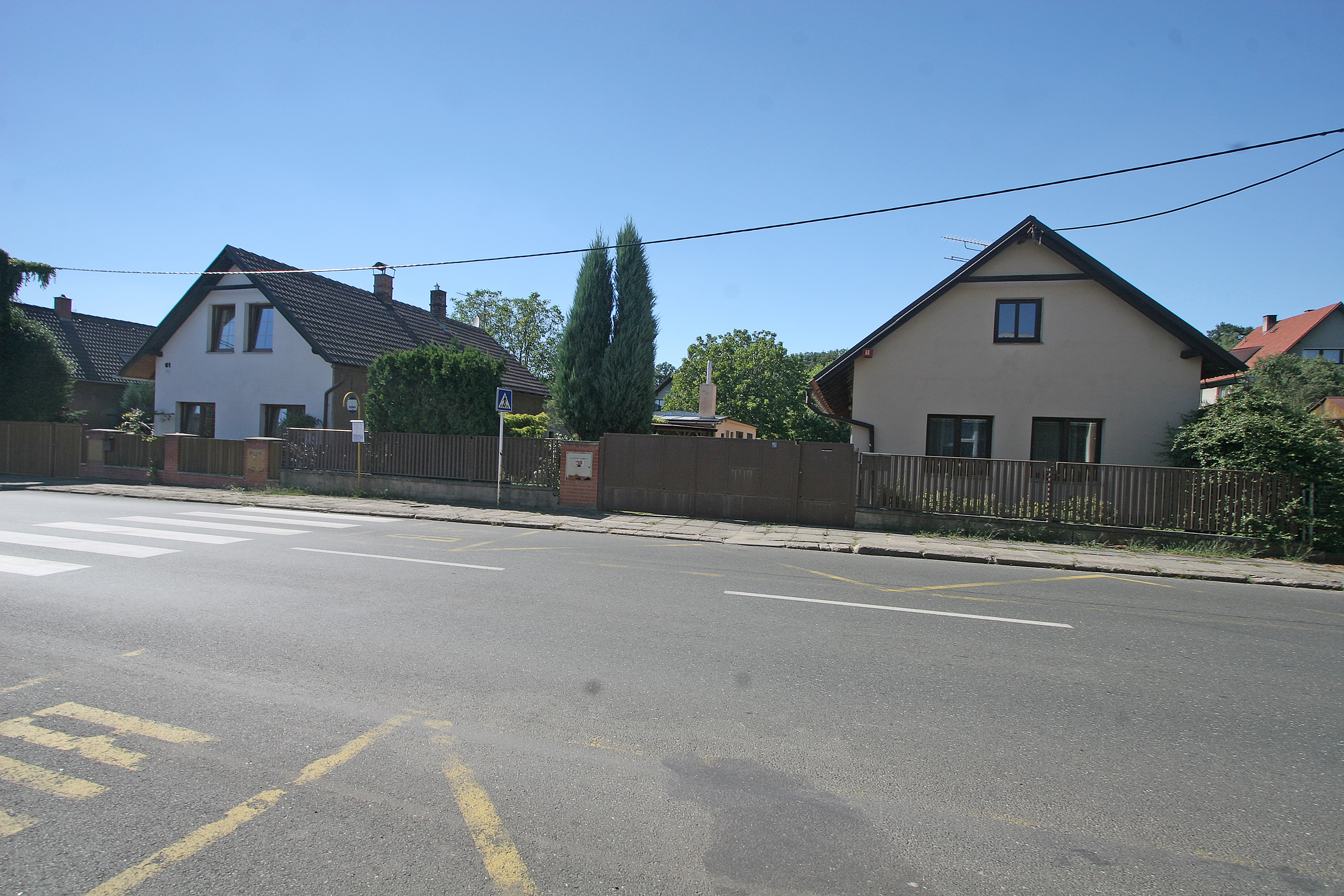
- Houses and bus stop

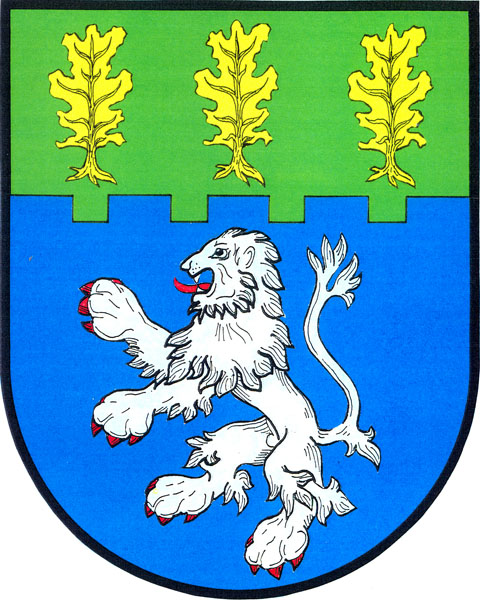
- Flag Coat of arms

- Location in the Czech Republic
- Coordinates: 50°8′25″N 15°26′53″E
- Country: Czech Republic
- Region: Hradec Králové
- District: Hradec Králové
- First mentioned: 1393

Area
  - Total: 6.40 km^{2} (2.47 sq mi)
- Elevation: 222 m (728 ft)

Population (2026-01-01)
  - Total: 383
  - Density: 59.8/km^{2} (155/sq mi)
- Time zone: UTC+1 (CET)
  - Summer (DST): UTC+2 (CEST)
- Postal code: 503 51
- Website: www.olesnice-nad-cidlinou.cz

Olešnice is a municipality and village in Hradec Králové District in the Hradec Králové Region of the Czech Republic. It has about 400 inhabitants.

== Administrative division ==
Olešnice consists of two municipal parts (in brackets population according to the 2021 census):

- Olešnice (295)
- Levín (86)

== Demographics ==
Historical population
Year	Pop.	±%
1869	332	—
1880	392	+18.1%
1890	397	+1.3%
1900	449	+13.1%
1910	489	+8.9%
1921	500	+2.2%
1930	537	+7.4%
1950	393	−26.8%
1961	386	−1.8%
1970	356	−7.8%
1980	308	−13.5%
1991	283	−8.1%
2001	288	+1.8%
2011	316	+9.7%
2021	381	+20.6%
Source: Censuses
