= East Elbe Table =

Plateau in the Czech Republic

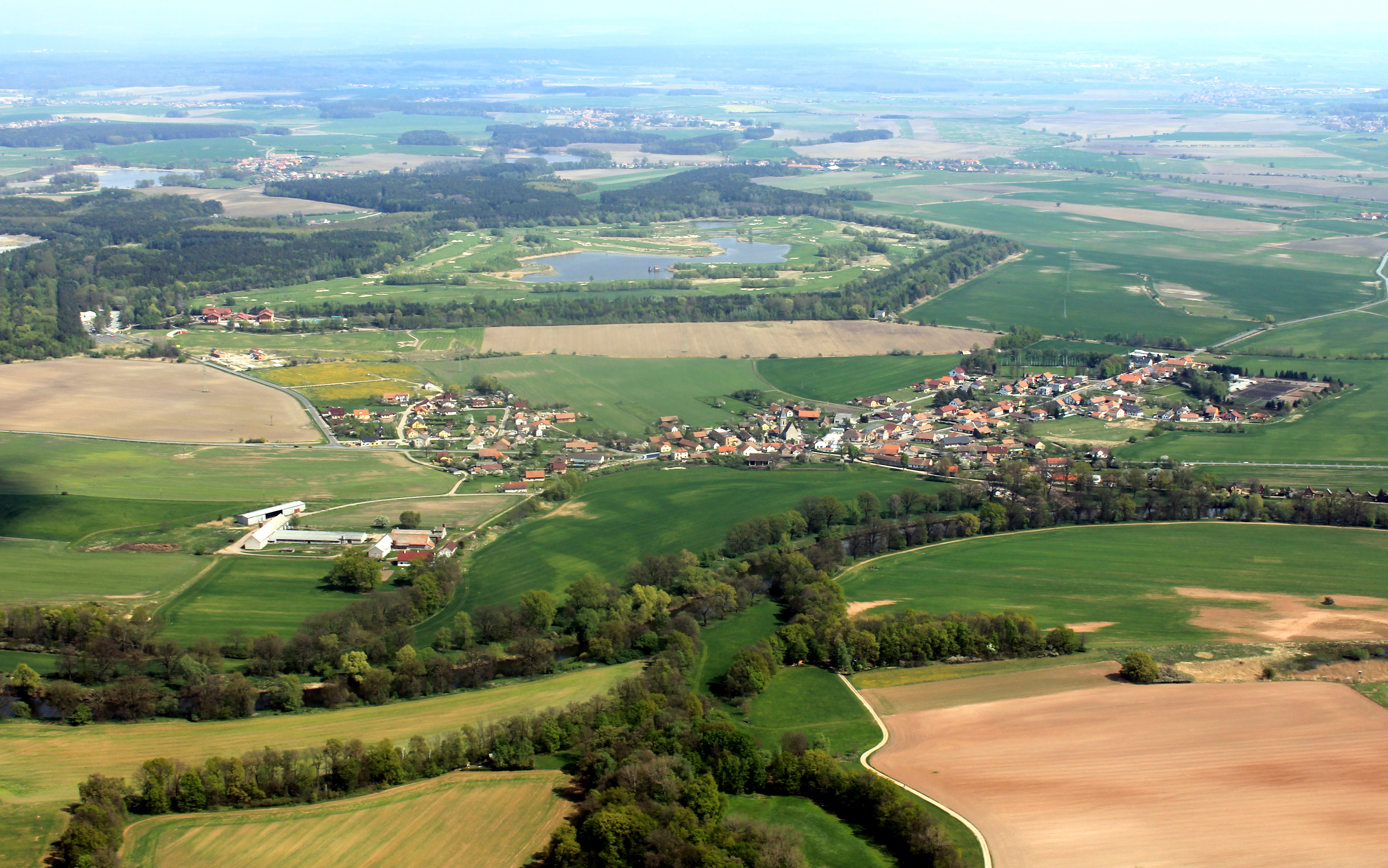
- Landscape around Dříteč

Highest point
- Peak: Na šancích
- Elevation: 352 m (1,155 ft)

Dimensions
- Length: 65 km (40 mi)
- Area: 1,689 km^{2} (652 mi^{2})

Geography
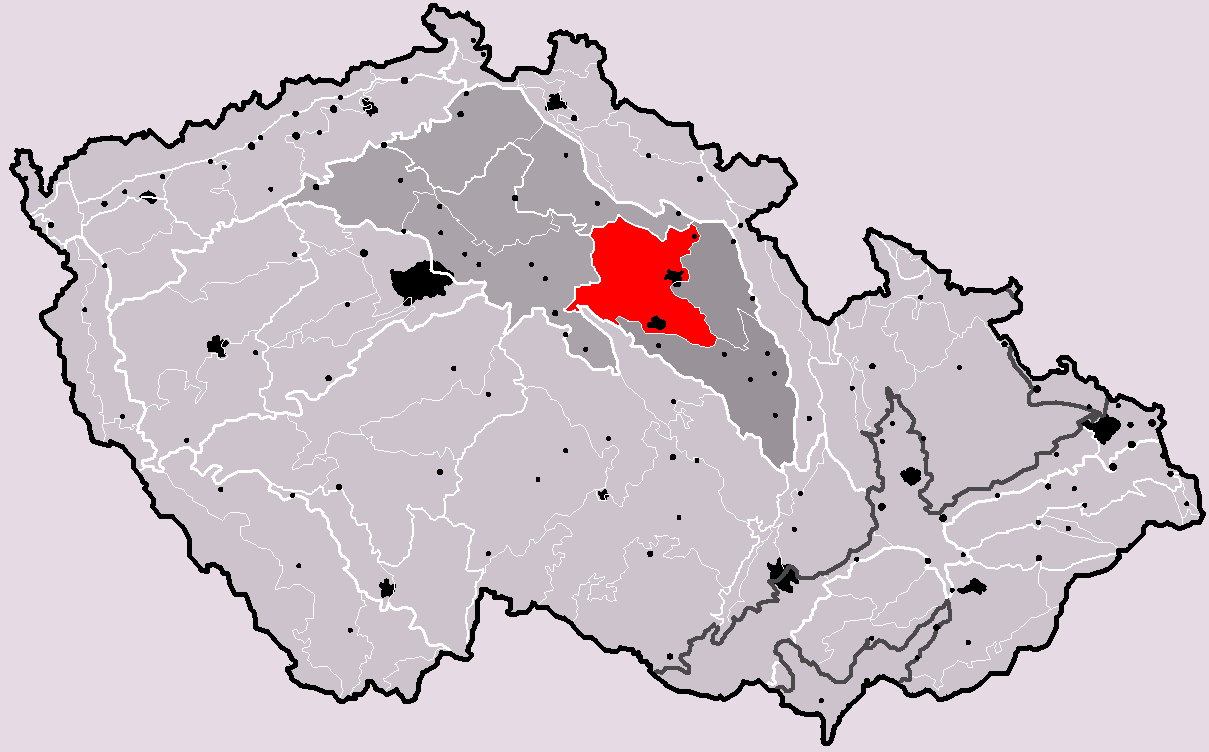
- East Elbe Table in the geomorphological system of the Czech Republic
- Country: Czech Republic
- Regions: Hradec Králové, Pardubice, Central Bohemian
- Range coordinates: 50°12′N 15°38′E
- Parent range: East Bohemian Table

Geology
- Rock type: Sedimentary rocks

The East Elbe Table (Czech: Východolabská tabule) is a plateau and a geomorphological mesoregion of the Czech Republic. It is located in the Hradec Králové, Pardubice and Central Bohemian region. The Elbe River flows through the territory, after which the plateau is named.

== Geomorphology ==
The East Elbe Table is a mesoregion of the East Bohemian Table within the Bohemian Massif. The landscape has a character of a flat upland with river terraces and valley floodplains. The plateau is further subdivided into the microregions of Cidlina Table, Chlumec Table and Pardubice Valley.

Due to the nature of the plateau, there are no significant peaks. The highest hills are Na šancích at 352 m (1,155 ft) above sea level, Chlum at 338 m (1,109 ft), Chloumek at 337 m (1,106 ft) and Svíb at 331 m (1,086 ft). All the highest hills are situated in the northeastern part of the plateau.

== Geography ==
The territory has a relatively regular rectangular shape with outcrops in the southwest and southeast. The plateau has an area of 1,689 square kilometres (652 sq mi) and an average elevation of 252 metres (827 ft). It is located mostly in the Hradec Králové and Pardubice regions, but it also marginally extends to the Central Bohemian Region. A large part of the territory overlaps with the informally defined region of Polabí.

The main watercourse the territory is the Elbe River, which flows through the eastern part of the plateau, then turns west and flows through the southern part of the plateau. The northwestern part of the territory is drained by the Cidlina (a tributary of the Elbe) and Bystřice (a tributary of the Cidlina). Other important river is the Chrudimka, which joins the Elbe in the southeast.

There are many small bodies of water in the East Elbe Table. These are mainly flooded quarries after sand and gravel mining.

Suitable natural conditions contributed to the creation of many settlements in the East Elbe Table. The most populous cities and towns in the territory are Hradec Králové, Pardubice, Jaroměř, Nový Bydžov, Holice, Chlumec nad Cidlinou and Sezemice. Partly located in the East Elbe Table are Přelouč and Hořice.

== Geology ==
The geological bedrock consists mainly of sedimentary rocks: marlite, claystone, spongilite and sandstone.

== Vegetation ==
The landscape has predominantly an agricultural character and is relatively sparsely forested.

== Gallery ==
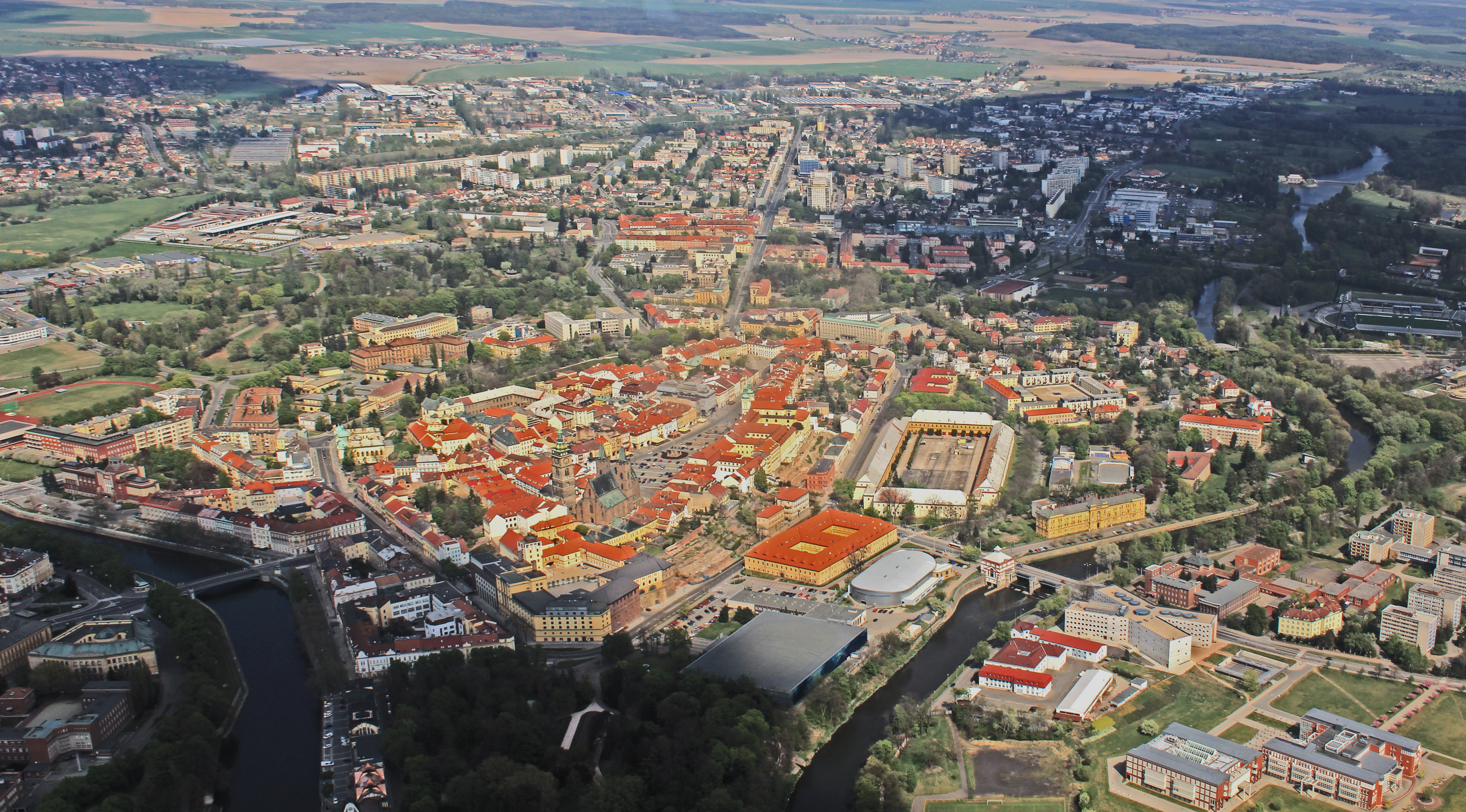
View of Hradec Králové

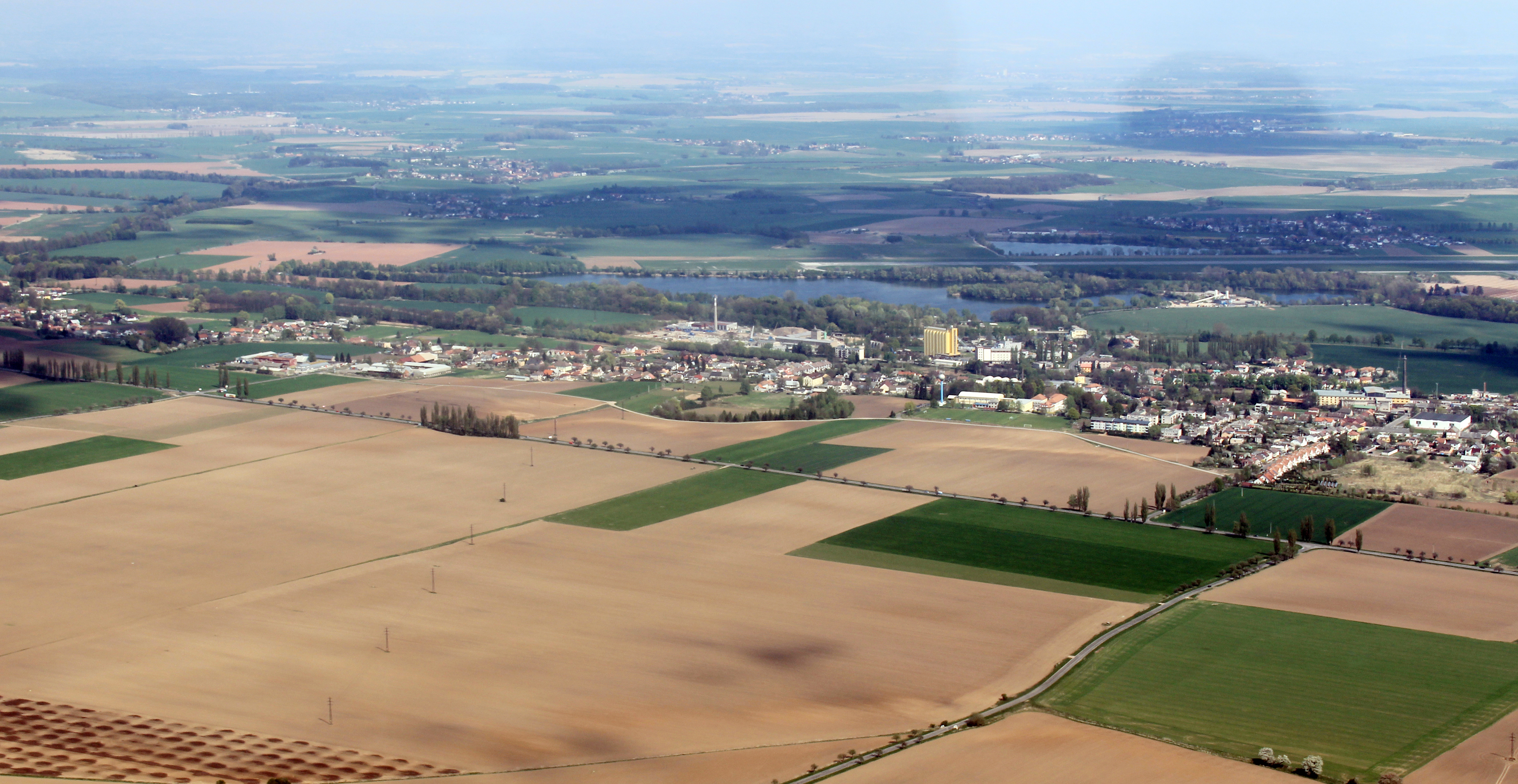
View of Předměřice nad Labem

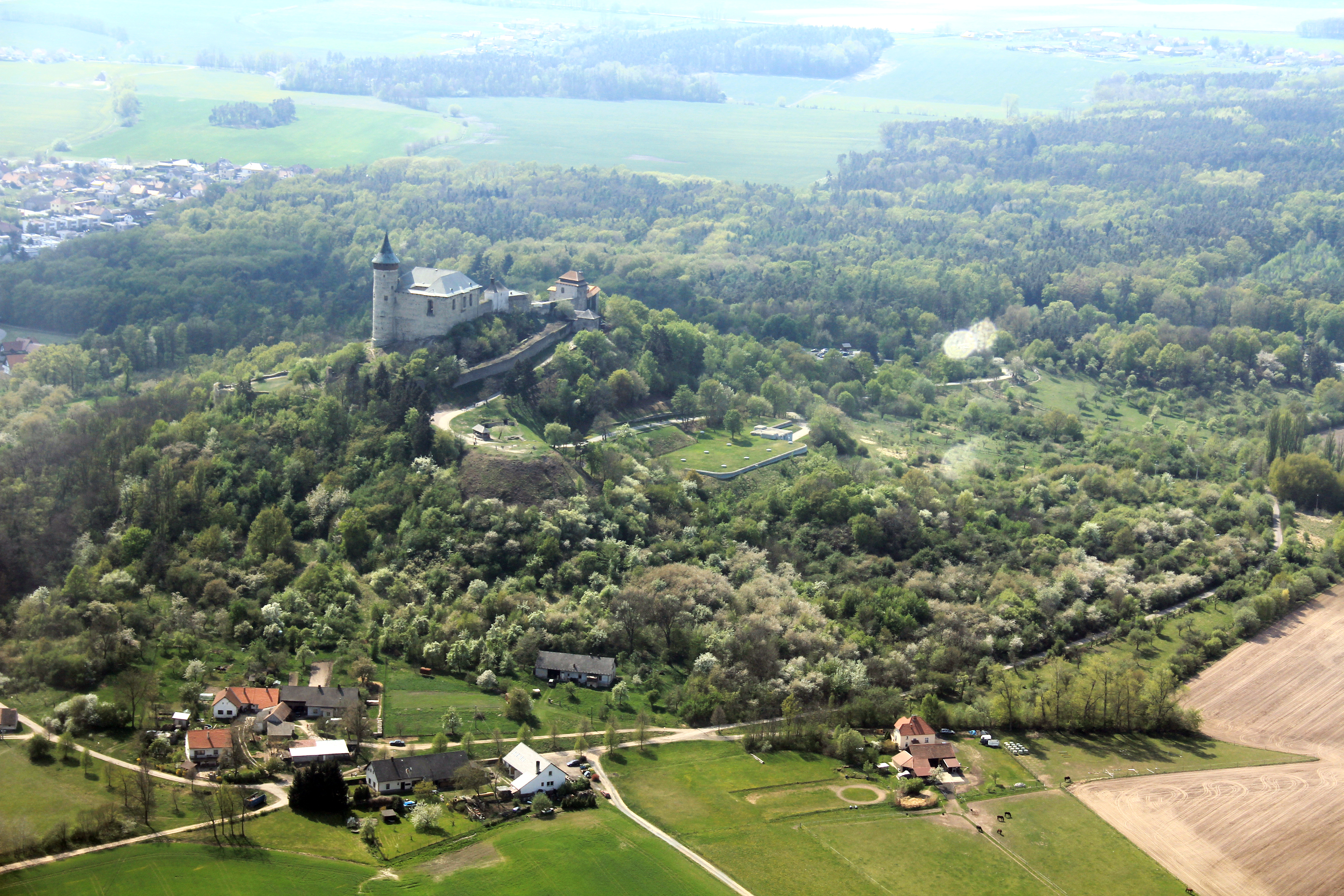
The hill Kunětická hora
