= Dobšice (Nymburk District) =

- Municipality
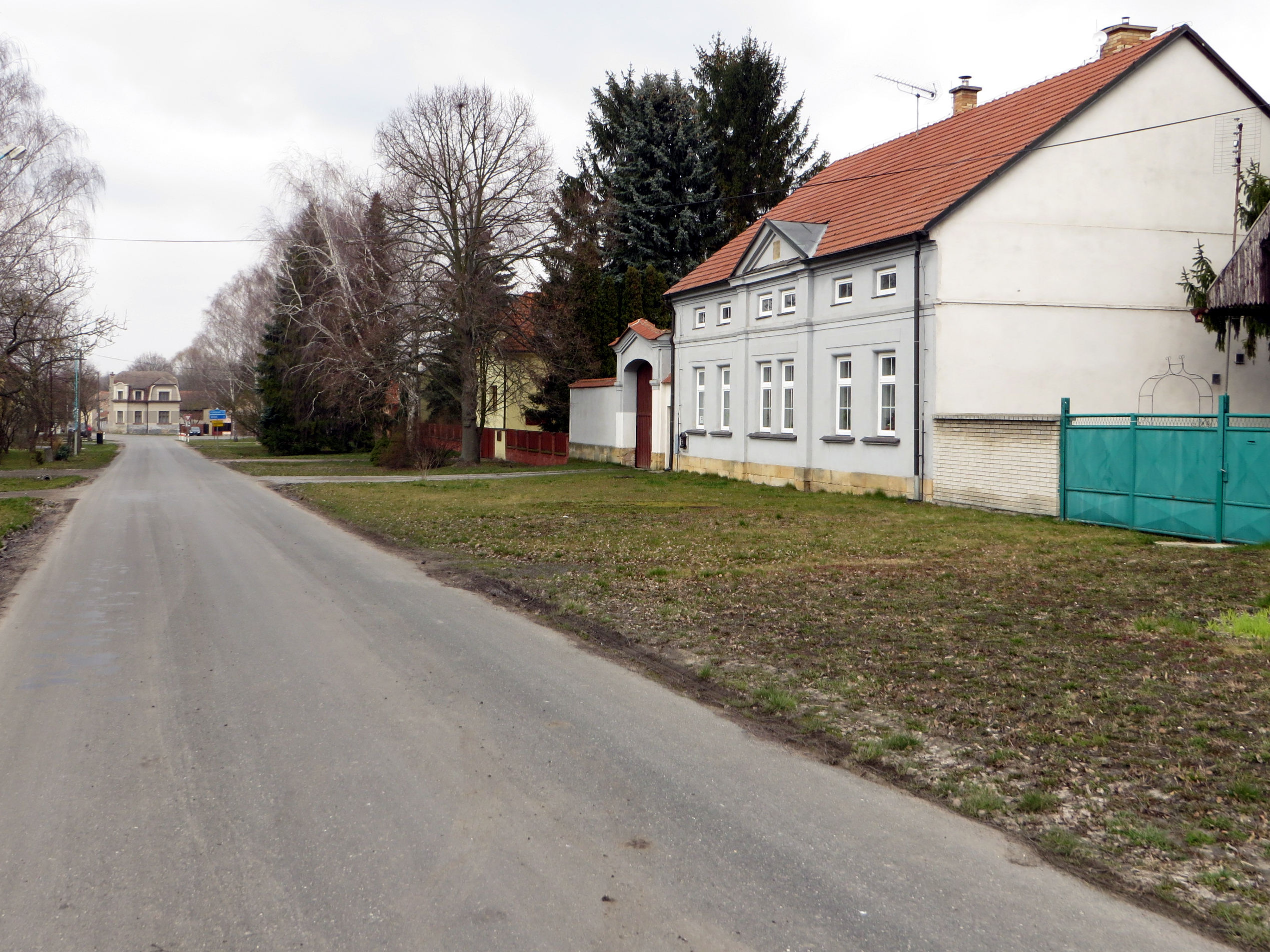
- Main street

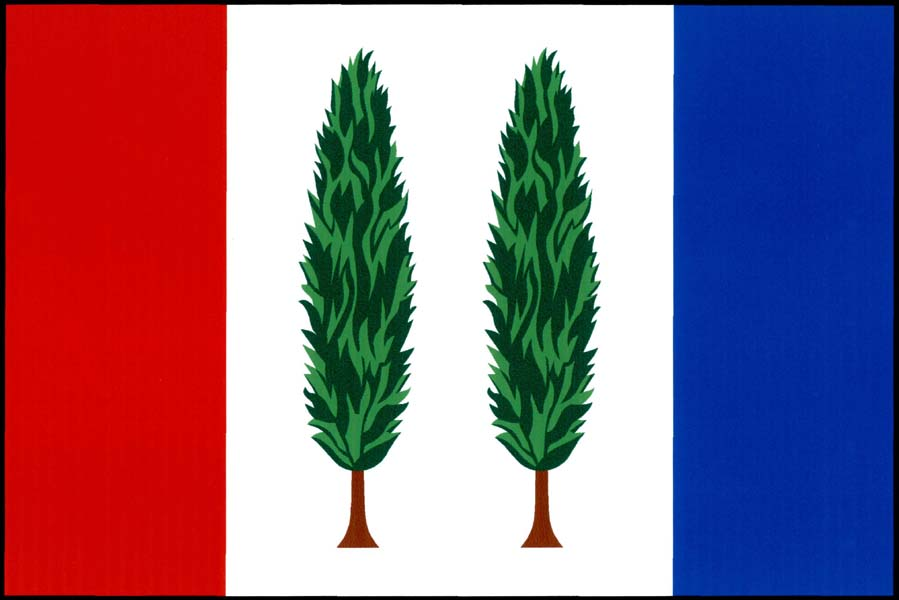
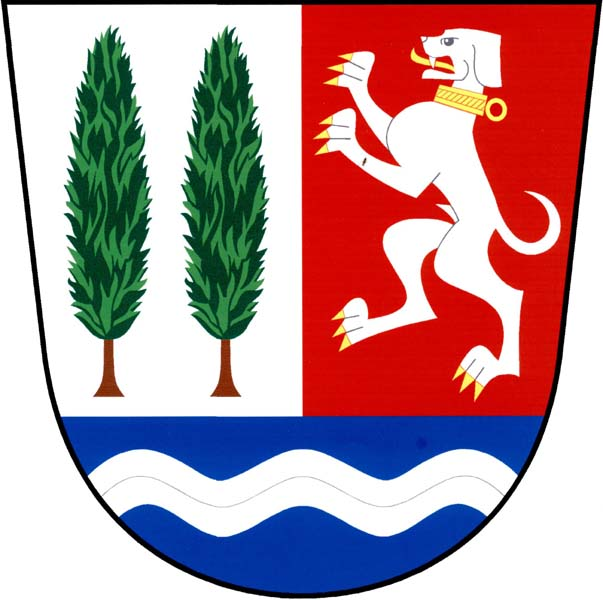
- Flag Coat of arms

- Location in the Czech Republic
- Coordinates: 50°7′57″N 15°16′7″E
- Country: Czech Republic
- Region: Central Bohemian
- District: Nymburk
- First mentioned: 1379

Area
  - Total: 6.67 km^{2} (2.58 sq mi)
- Elevation: 200 m (660 ft)

Population (2026-01-01)
  - Total: 257
  - Density: 38.5/km^{2} (99.8/sq mi)
- Time zone: UTC+1 (CET)
  - Summer (DST): UTC+2 (CEST)
- Postal code: 289 05
- Website: www.obec-dobsice.cz

Dobšice is a municipality and village in Nymburk District in the Central Bohemian Region of the Czech Republic. It has about 300 inhabitants.

== Demographics ==
Historical population
| Year | Pop. | ±% |
|---|---|---|
| 1869 | 480 | — |
| 1880 | 528 | +10.0% |
| 1890 | 514 | −2.7% |
| 1900 | 487 | −5.3% |
| 1910 | 485 | −0.4% |
| 1921 | 498 | +2.7% |
| 1930 | 472 | −5.2% |
| 1950 | 384 | −18.6% |
| 1961 | 371 | −3.4% |
| 1970 | 319 | −14.0% |
| 1980 | 282 | −11.6% |
| 1991 | 220 | −22.0% |
| 2001 | 186 | −15.5% |
| 2011 | 210 | +12.9% |
| 2021 | 245 | +16.7% |
Source: Censuses
