= Massacre of the Slavníks =

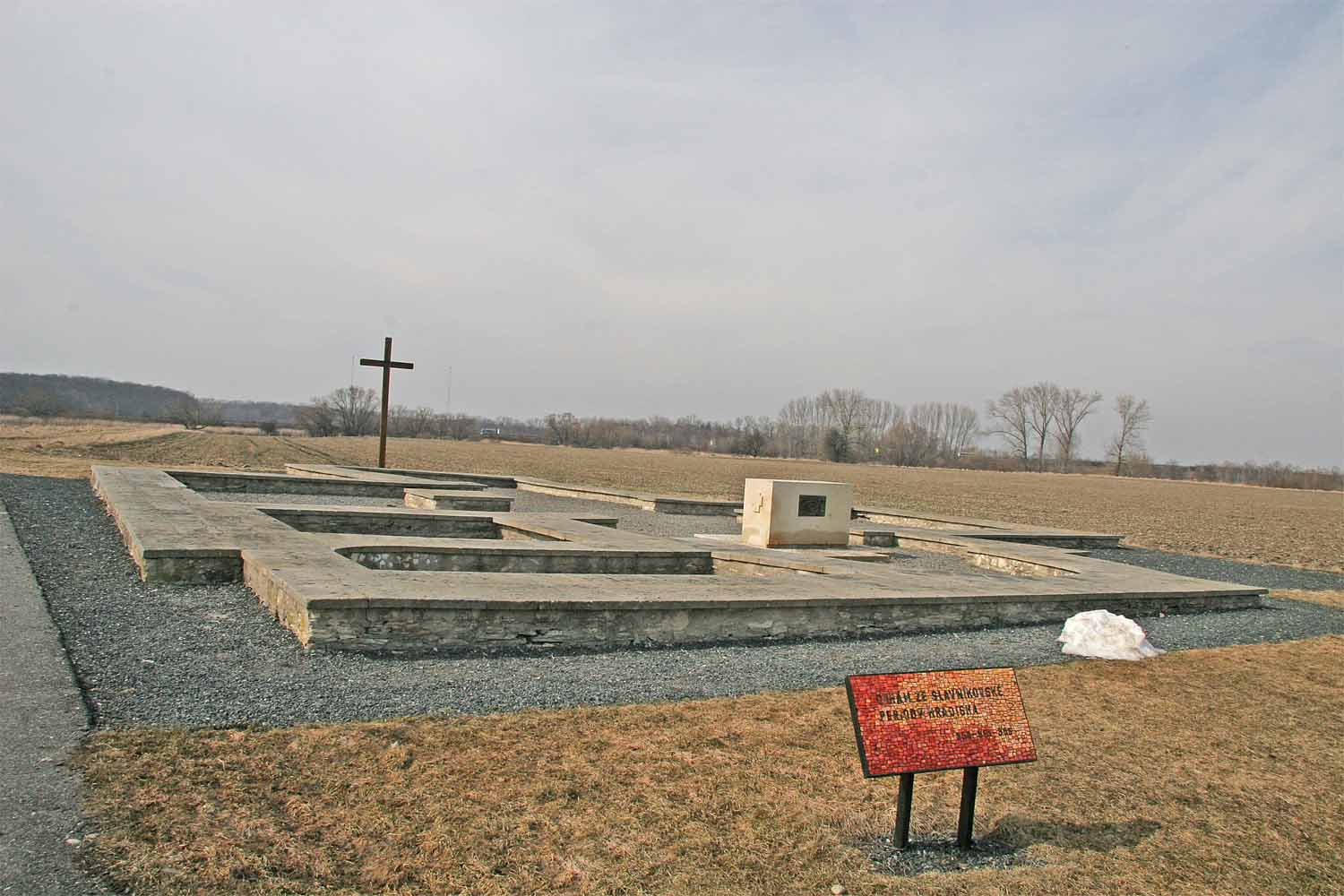
- Site of the Slavník gord in Libice nad Cidlinou
- Native name: Vyvraždění Slavníkovců
- Date: 28 September 995
- Location: Libice nad Cidlinou
- Outcome: Extermination of the Slavník dynasty (except for Adalbert, Soběslav, and Radim)

The Massacre of the Slavníks was an act of violence during which Bohemian nobles of Boleslaus II, Duke of Bohemia slaughtered the members of the competing Slavník dynasty in Libice on 28 September 995. Only Soběslav, Adalbert, and their stepbrother Radim survived. According to older sources, this act was considered to be the event that brought about the founding of the Duchy of Bohemia. Other similar instances are reported during this same period of foundation, but no archaeological evidence of them exists.

== Timeline of the bloodshed ==
On 28 September 995, the Slavník clan was celebrating Saint Wenceslaus' Day in their gord at Libice. Wenceslaus had been murdered exactly 60 years prior in Stará Boleslav. In the middle of the celebration, Bohemian nobles stormed the gord and murdered all present members of the Slavník clan in the vicinity of the church.

Of the Slavníks, only Soběslav, Adalbert (who had just left Bohemia, which he resented, for a second time, never to return), and their stepbrother Radim survived.

Though some textbooks mention the burning and slaughter of the entire village, contemporary sources discuss only the Slavník massacre. This is confirmed by the hundred years of archaeological research conducted in Libice; no significant burn layers were found, and the hillfort was confirmed to have carried out its function even after these events.

The Slavníks had requested a truce on that day on account of the celebration, but the attackers declared that if Wenceslaus was their saint, Boleslaus was theirs (it was Boleslaus, duke of Bohemia, who had killed Saint Wenceslaus, his brother, 60 years prior).

Because at that time Duke Boleslav was not in his own power but in that of the comites, the comites, turned to the hatred of God, the worse sons of evil fathers, perpetrated a very bad and evil crime. On a certain feast day, they secretly broke into the burg of Libice, where the brothers of Saint Adalbert and all the burg's warriors stood, like innocent sheep, celebrating the feast with the holy solemnities of the Mass. Like savage wolves, the comites broke through the walls of the burg, killing everyone to a man, male and female. Having beheaded the four brothers of Saint Adalbert with all their children before the altar itself, they burned down the burg, bathed the streets in blood, and returned cheerful to their own homes loaded with bloody spoils and cruel plunder. In the burg of Libice the five brothers of Saint Adalbert were killed in the year 995; their names are Soběbor, Spytimír, Dobroslav, Pořej, Čáslav. - Cosmas of Prague, Chronica Boemorum

== Perpetrators and motive ==
The concrete identities of the perpetrators and clients, as well as the nature of their motive, are the subjects of varying hypotheses and of further research. It is sometimes stated that the Vršovci clan constituted the main force of the assault on the Slavník gord, but this has not been proven.

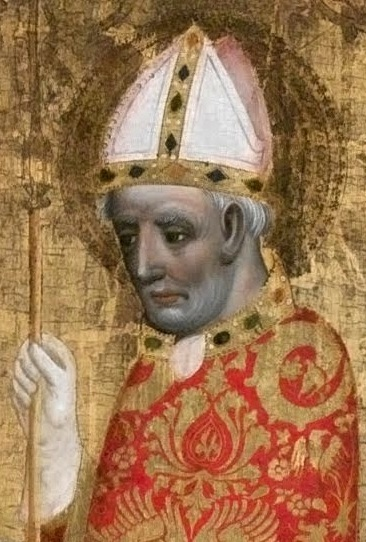
Saint Adalbert of Prague

It is possible that the motive was the wealth of the Slavník clan and of their gords at Libice and Malín, situated on the trade routes to Silesia, Moravia, and Lesser Poland. The reserves of gold and silver mined in the area are also a subject of discussion. This impressive wealth may have concerned the ruling Přemyslids.

Political circumstances could have influenced the events as well. Mieszko I, the duke of Poland, was conquering lands of Lesser Poland and Silesia, which are often related to the so-called White Croatia, then the eastern part of the Duchy of Bohemia. As the Slavniks could have been related to the White Croats, they possibly became influenced by the Poles because of which Soběslav probably did not support Boleslav II in his anti-Polish campaign, which ended in defeat. Přemyslids presumably perceived the events as devastating for their future and as a desperate measure decided to get rid of the Slavnik's dynasty and uniting whole of Bohemia under their rule.

Another motive may have been an incident that occurred during Adalbert's tenure as bishop of Prague, which saw him provide an adulteress with ecclesiastical asylum in Prague Castle, thereby defending her and the adulterer, his deacon. However, he had a strained relationship with some local warriors, evidently of the Vršovci family, who did not respect the ecclesiastical asylum, and, deaf to the bishop's exhortations, hauled the woman out of the church and beheaded her, despite her husband's opposition, before Adalbert's very eyes. In the aftermath of the attack, the Slavníks were threatened with revenge for the fact that their kinsman Adalbert had resisted the woman's immediate punishment. Two legal systems were at play in the context of the incident. The granting of ecclesiastical asylum, encoded in ecclesiastical law, was not respected, and, within the framework of customary and traditional ancestral law, a blood feud, the usual way of solving similar problems at the time, was threatened. Though it was his duty to do so, Duke Boleslaus II was unable to prevent the potential vendetta, since he had been indisposed by a stroke and was incapable of governing.

== Step in the formation of a Bohemian state ==
According to older sources, the massacre was unequivocally considered up until the 1990s to be the event by which the Bohemian state came into being. Historian Jiří Sláma, however, claims that it already existed, and that the real milestone in its foundation was Saint Wenceslaus' murder on 28 September 935 in Stará Boleslav, which was followed by a revolution in Bohemia that marks the beginning of the founding of a Bohemian state. On the other hand, historian Petr Charvát maintains that Boleslav II was the state's unifier.
