= Slavník dynasty =

Bohemian dynasty

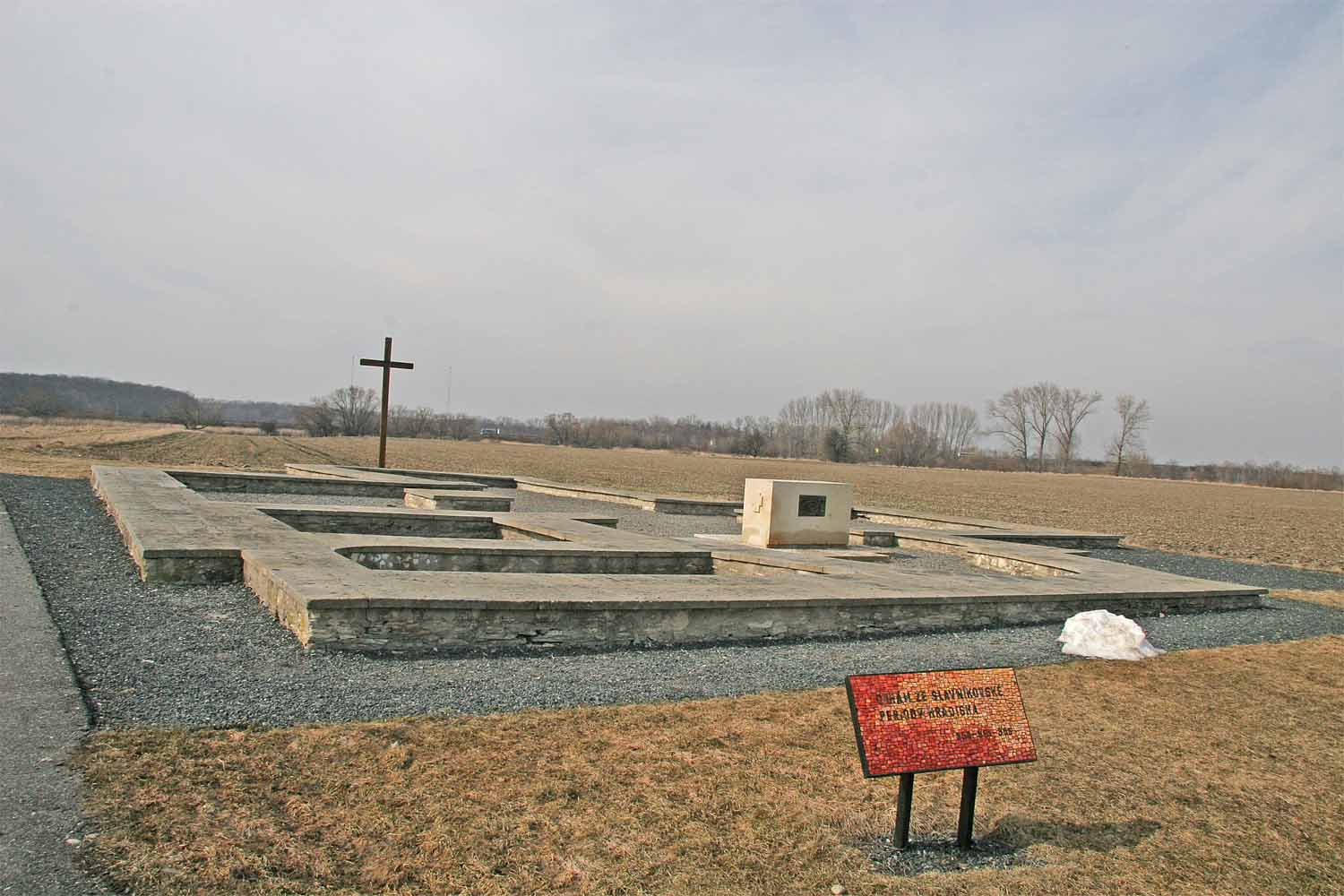
Foundations of a church in the Slavniks' gord Libice nad Cidlinou, Central Bohemia

The Slavníks, also called Slavnikids (Czech: Slavníkovci; German: Slawnikiden; Polish: Sławnikowice), was a dynasty in the Duchy of Bohemia during the 10th century. The center of the semi-independent principality was the gord of Libice located at the confluence of the rivers Cidlina and Elbe. The Slavníks competed with the Přemyslid dynasty for control over Bohemia and eventually succumbed to them after the Massacre of the Slavníks (995), with their most notable member being Saint Adalbert of Prague. There's a scholarly debate about whether the dynasty can be identified with the White Croats.

== History ==
=== Etymology ===
The name Slavník comes from the Proto-Slavic *slava ("glory") + *-nikъ.

=== Origin and early history ===
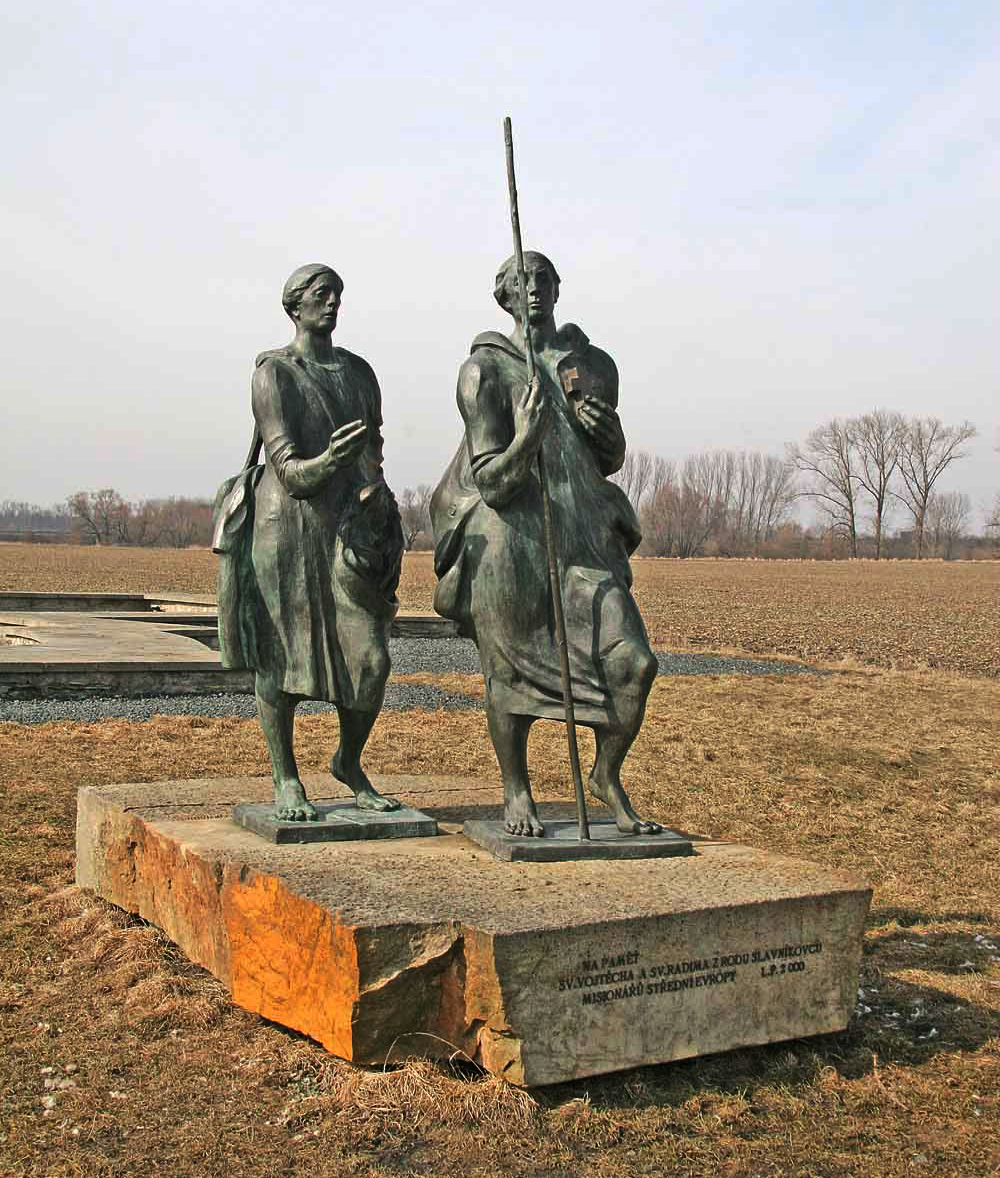
St. Adalbert (Vojtěch) and his brother Gaudentius (Radim). The statues in Libice

The vast majority of what is known about the Slavnik family, is from the works by John Canaparius, Bruno of Querfurt, and Cosmas of Prague. Prince (dux) Slavník (†981), is generally considered as the founder of the dynasty, as there is no certain older relevant personality (possibly duke Witizla from 895). He therefore also gave the name to the whole family. According to Bruno of Querfurt, Slavník was the grandson of the Saxon duke Henry I, by maternal line most probably of an unknown Slavic woman, with whom Otto I had an illegitimate son William. This connection explains the friendly relationship between Slavnik's son Vojtěch, Saint Adalbert of Prague, with Otto III, and the Otto's efforts (Congress of Gniezno) around St. Adalbert's canonization, and the installation of Adalbert's brother Radim Gaudentius as the first archbishop of Gniezno Cathedral.

According to Canaprius and Bruno of Querfurt, Slavnik was a noble ruler, and although he ruled over a vast territory and had plenty of gold and silver and minions, he was a humble man, generous towards to the poor people. His wife Střezislava, a noble woman characterized by modesty and compassion, came from a noble Slavic family, "worthy of his royal blood". As such, they were appreciated by both nobles and common people. Slavník had at least 6 sons, among whom two – Vojtěch (Adalbert) and the illegitimate Radim (Gaudentius) – later became saints.

Slavnik's duchy tried to keep its quasi-independence by maintaining friendly relationships with its neighbours, such as with the blood-related Saxon Ottonian dynasty, or with the Přemyslid dynasty or Zlicans (supposedly related to Střezislava), and with the Polish Piast dynasty.

Many scholars, including Vjekoslav Klaić, Francis Dvornik, Henryk Łowmiański, Alexis P. Vlasto, Valentin Vasilyevich Sedov, among others, considered that the dynasty was related to the White Croats, who presumably lived in the eastern parts of early medieval Bohemia, corresponding to the territory of the Slavník dynasty principality. However, other scholars doubt or reject such a thesis; among Czech historians, Rudolf Turek and Rostislav Nový supported it according, by now abandoned, hypothesis about the Czech tribes, while Jiří Sláma and Dušan Třeštík argued "that even if it were possible to localize this ethnic group in northeastern Bohemia, there is absolutely no reason to believe that the Slavníkovci were their rulers", and that the Croats "never lived on Czech territory".

=== Slavniks' downfall ===
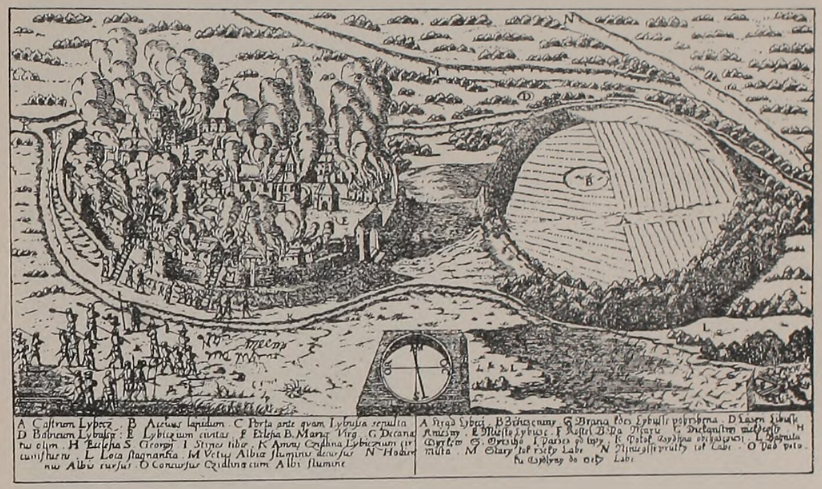
Siege of Libice nad Cidlinou in 995, by Matthias Bolelucký 1668

Slavnik's heir was his son Soběslav who rushed to consolidate the princedom's independence. For instance, he began to coin money in Libice, known among numismatists as the silver senars, in spite of the primacy of Prague. Prague was the capital of the Duchy of Bohemia, ruled by Boleslaus II, and the Diocese of Prague was founded there in 973. However, after Adalbert was appointed the head of the Diocese in 982, a conflict escalated between Boleslaus II of Bohemia and Poland's Duke Bolesław I Chrobry in 985, and in 989 Adalbert left the Diocese, only to return in 991 or 992 when a truce was signed. Although he managed to found the Břevnov Monastery, as he was from another principality's noble family, he did not have enough authority and support by Boleslaus II in the Diocese, and in late 994 offered his episcopal see to Strachkvas, Boleslaus II's brother, who nevertheless refused it. In 995 Adalbert again temporarily left for Rome.

In these conflicts lies the answer of their downfall. Slavniks did not help Boleslaus II, they were either neutral or allied with Bolesław I of Poland. This was a direct challenge to Boleslaus II; he could not afford any mighty rivals and was determined to add the Slavnik lands to his dukedom. In early September of 995, while Soběslav was at war against Lusatian tribes as Boleslaw's and Otto III's ally, Boleslaus II with confederates (the Vršovci) stormed Libice on September 28, and massacred all of the family, although he originally promised a truce to Soběslav's brothers until his return.

Only three Slavnik family members survived, because they were not present at Libice at that time: Soběslav, Adalbert and Radim (Gaudentius).

=== Aftermath ===
Soběslav temporarily lived in Poland and was comforted by Bolesław I. The ruler also stood out as an intermediary for Adalbert toward Boleslaus II, appealing for Adalbert's return, but the nobility and the people did not accept Adalbert, as they were afraid of his possible vengeful intentions.

In 996, when Strachkvas Přemyslid was going to assume the office of a bishop in Prague, he suddenly died during the ceremony. The strength of the conflict of the two dynasties is also demonstrated by the Přemyslid rulers' refusal to ransom Saint Adalbert's body from the Prussians who murdered him, so it was purchased by Bolesław I, and was quickly canonized by the common effort with Otto III.

Soon after, a temporary anarchy escalated in Bohemia, as two weak dukes Boleslaus III and Vladivoj followed, leading to the Bolesław I's temporary control of Prague. Eventually, a year later, Soběslav was killed by Bohemians defending a bridge near Prague, shielding the retreat of Polish forces from Prague in 1004.

== Territory ==
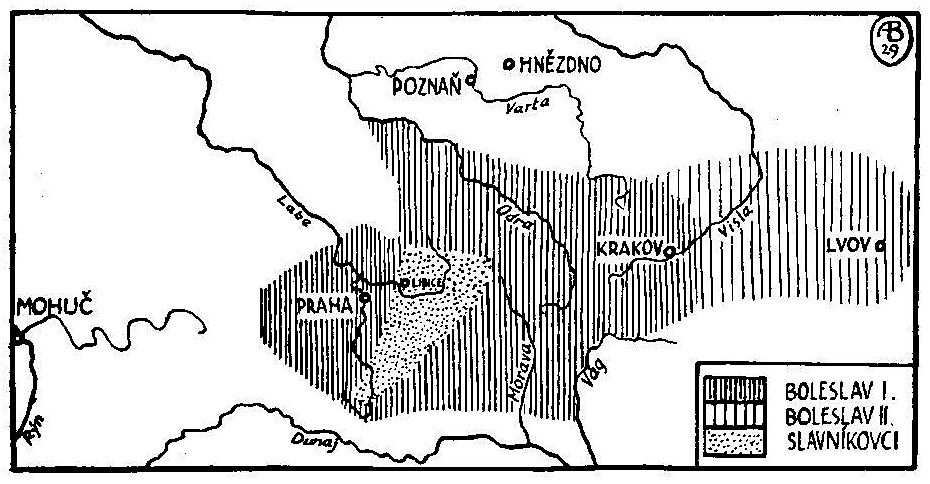
The territory of the dynasty in the Duchy of Bohemia under Boleslaus I. and Boleslaus II, Duke of Bohemia.

According to the Czech archaeologist E. Šimek (1930), who researched the note by Cosmas of Prague, the center of the Slavnik's principality was Libice, a castrum located at the confluence of the rivers Cidlina and Elbe, and fort Stara Kouřim. It included castrum Litomyšl, and their border in the East went as far as castrum Kłodzko on the Nisa river in now South-Western Poland. In the North their land went as far Charvatce, probably previous or newly founded settlement by the White Croats. In the West their territory stretched along the rivers Jizera, and further in the South-West along Vltava and in the short part Mže. The territory included settlements Netolice, Doudleby and Chýnov.

== Family members ==
=== Certain ===
- Slavník (†981)
- Strezislava (†987)
- Soběslav or Soběbor (†1004)
- Spytimír (†995)
- Pobraslav (†995)
- Porej (†995)
- Časlav (†995)
- Vojtěch Saint Adalbert of Prague (†997)

=== Related ===
- Radim Gaudentius

=== Possible ===
- Witizla (895)
- Vok
- Radslav the Zlican
- Radla – a priest or a monk, the teacher of Adalbert
- Astrik

== See also ==
- List of rulers of Bohemia
- Kingdom of Bohemia
- White Croatia
