= Witizla =

Bohemian duke

Witizla (or Vitěslav), was a Bohemian duke who with Spytihněv I of Přemyslid dynasty, according to Annales Fuldenses, as Bohemian representatives came to pledge allegiance to Frankish king Arnulf in 895. This was the last time in Bohemian history when there were groups of princes like Bohemians, Lemuzes, Lucans or Zlicans. He was possibly the founder of Slavnik's dynasty.

According to Francis Dvornik, "the fact that two dukes are specially mentioned indicates that Bohemia was divided into two dukedoms", which could be related to the White Croats's White Croatia and Slavnik's dynasty in eastern part of medieval Bohemia. The two dukedoms became part of Great Moravia in the 9th century, and after its downfall (c. 895), continued to be close allies until Massacre of the Slavníks (995) and unification of whole Bohemia.

== See also ==
- Bohemians (tribe)
