= Sicco (pagan priest) =

Prussian pagan priest and leader

Sicco, Sikko, or Siggo (second half of the 10th century) was a Prussian, a pagan priest of the Prussian ethnic religion and leader of the group responsible for the killing of Adalbert of Prague. He is mentioned in the two earliest hagiographic works dedicated to the martyr. The name by which he is known is generally considered a conventional name.

== Sicco in historical sources ==
The First Life of Saint Adalbert, likely authored by John Canaparius, states that Sicco struck the missionary with a spear through the heart, acting as the first assailant due to his priestly role. In the Aventine redaction of the text, the leader-priest is named Sicco, while in the Monte Cassino redaction, the killer is not named but described as an "elder".

In contrast, the Second Life of Saint Adalbert by Bruno of Querfurt does not mention the leader being a priest, though he is still depicted as delivering the first blow. Additionally, this account notes that Sicco lost a brother in a battle against the Polans. The name Sicco appears only in the shorter redaction of this work.

Sicco also appears as the Prussian leader in the Czech versified hagiography Quatuor immensi, likely from the turn of the 13th and 14th centuries, which clearly draws on the account attributed to Canaparius.

== Interpretations ==
Scholars generally agree that, despite differences, the hagiographic texts likely refer to the same individual. The occasional omission of Sicco's priestly role stems from reliance on Bruno's account, which may have deliberately excluded ritual or sacral motives to emphasize vengeance instead. It is possible that the story of avenging a brother's death was not Bruno's invention but originated from the Prussians themselves, who may have justified their actions to envoys of the Polish ruler Bolesław I the Brave during negotiations to ransom Adalbert's remains. The assailants, likely warriors from a stronghold guard, are interpreted as performing ritualistic elements during the missionary's execution – such as Sicco's use of a notably large spear, possibly of ceremonial significance – for violating the order to leave Prussian lands, as decided by a tribal assembly.

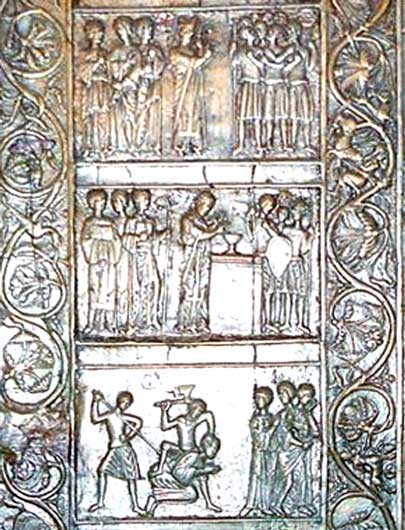
Detail of the Gniezno Doors, three panels depicting scenes from Saint Adalbert's life (from top): preaching to the Prussians, last Mass, martyrdom

== Etymology of the name ==
The name Sicco was typically treated by copyists as a proper name, occasionally as a common noun, and in one instance as an abbreviation of the Latin siccarius ("assassin"). While some modern works still consider it a personal name, it is often regarded as a conventional name. It likely derives from a distortion of the Prussian term zigo ("walker" or "wanderer"), referring to priests who traveled between settlements to provide counsel, healing, and prayers, and who, during military campaigns, served as seers and were obliged to strike the first blow in battle. Consequently, many works on Saint Adalbert, especially popular biographies, omit the name Sicco, simply noting that a priest delivered the first blow.

== Sicco and the Gniezno Doors ==
Scholars have sought Sicco's presence in the Gniezno Doors reliefs. Joachim Lelewel identified Sicco as the Prussian piercing the missionary with a spear in the martyrdom scene (panel 14), but did not associate him with the priest, whom he saw as the figure preparing to behead Adalbert with an axe. Jadwiga Karwasińska suggested that the priest-leader is depicted in panel 12, holding a curved staff and standing at the forefront of Prussians listening to Adalbert's preaching.

== Bibliography ==
- Banaszkiewicz, Jan (2001). "Dwie sceny z żywotów i z życia św. Wojciecha: misjonarz i wiec Prusów, martyrium biskupa" [Two Scenes from the Lives and Life of Saint Adalbert: The Missionary and the Prussian Assembly, Martyrdom of the Bishop]. In Iwańczuk, Wojciech; Kuczyński, Stefan K. (eds.). Ludzie, Kościół, wierzenia. Studia z dziejów kultury i społeczeństwa Europy Środkowej (średniowiecze – wczesna epoka nowożytna) [People, Church, Beliefs: Studies on the History of Culture and Society in Central Europe (Middle Ages – Early Modern Period)] (in Polish). Warsaw: DiG. ISBN 837181223X.
- Mielczarski, Stanisław (1967). Misja pruska św. Wojciecha [Prussian Mission of Saint Adalbert] (in Polish). Gdańsk: Gdańskie Towarzystwo Naukowe.
