= Vršovci =

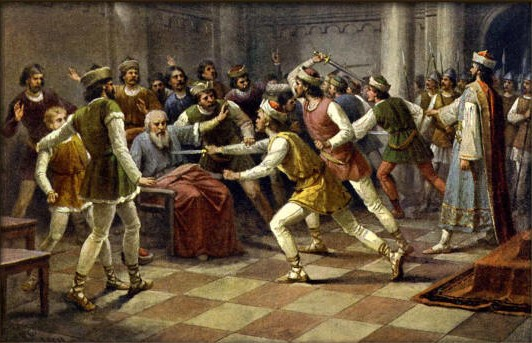
The doom of Vršovci

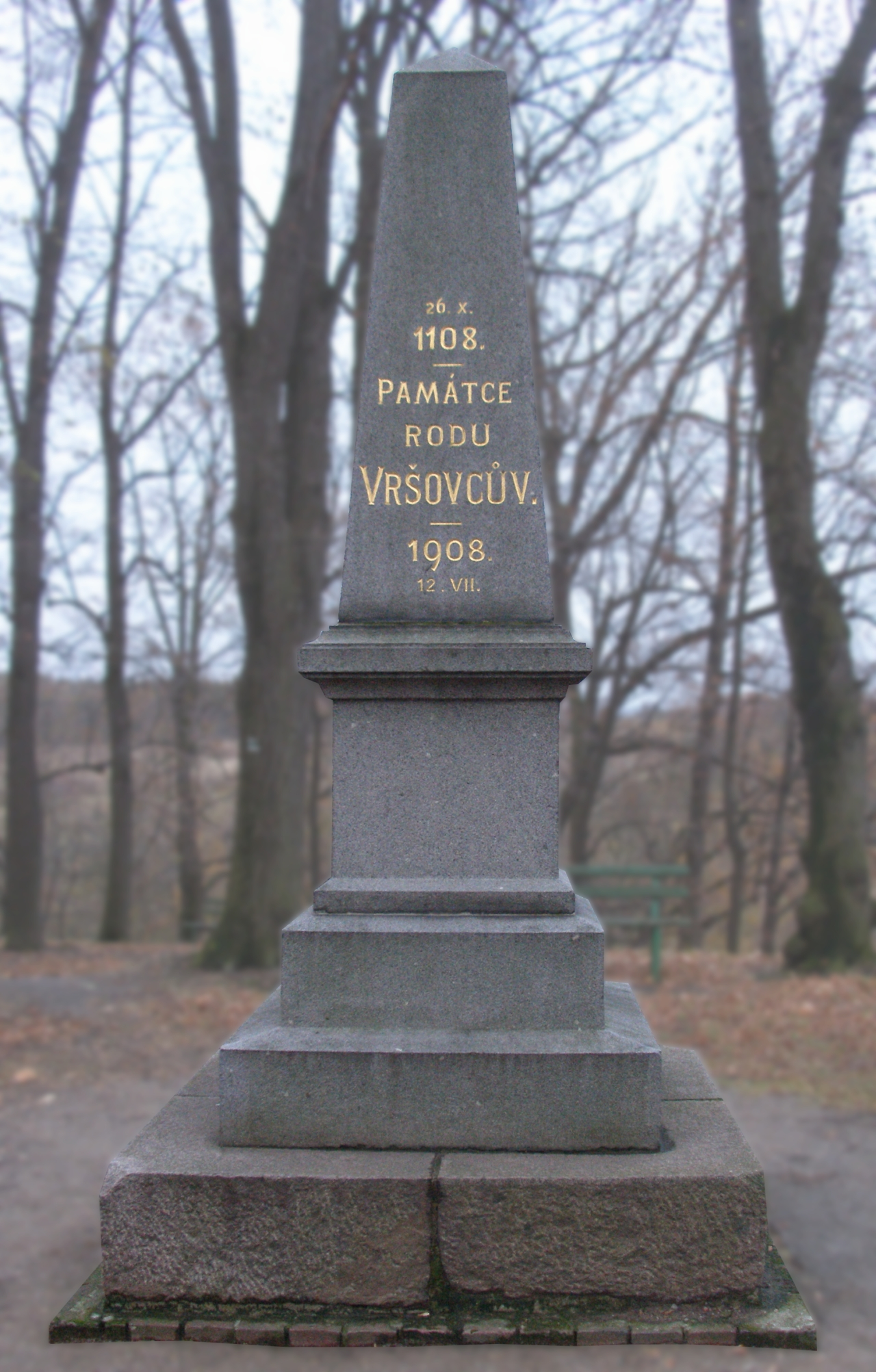
Memorial of Vršovci in Vraclav, Czech Republic

The Vršovci (also Vrshovici; singular: Vršovec) were an ancient Czech noble family in the Duchy of Bohemia.

== History ==
=== In Bohemia ===
First noted in the power struggles of the 10th–12th centuries in Bohemia. The Vršovci were the third most powerful political force in newly Christianized Bohemia, after the reigning Přemyslids (Přemyslovci) and the contending Slavníks (Slavníkovci).

They were active in Bohemian conflicts with Poland, Hungary and the Kings and Electors of the Holy Roman Empire, and also in the intermittent internal conflicts common for feudally fragmented regimes of that time. The Vršovci possessed such towns as Žatec and Litoměřice.

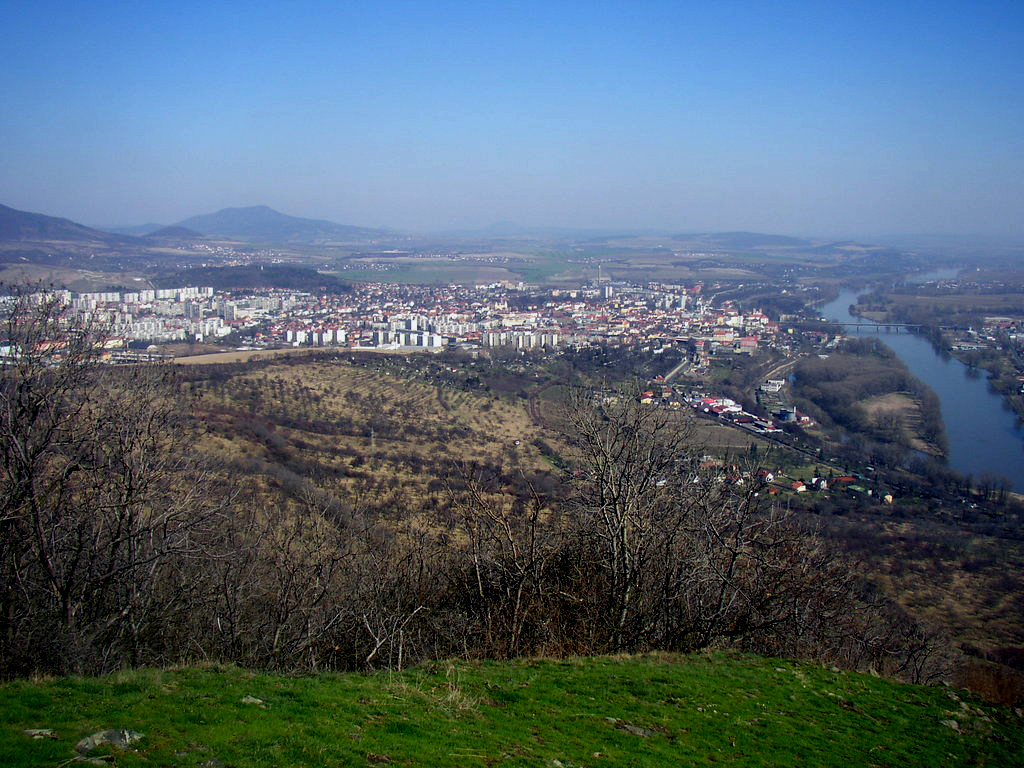
Litoměřice as seen from the Radobýl Hill

They had consanguinity with the Přemyslids and often cooperated with them. Some historians supposed that, unlike their opponents, the other two leading families of Bohemia, the Vršovci could have retained some pagan beliefs in the 10th century.

The etymology of the clan name is still a subject of dispute. One version claims its origin to be Czech "fishnet" i.e. "Vrša", while another opinion would have it derived from "Vrsa/Vrsvs" ("Ursa/Ursus"), Latin for "female bear/bear".

The Vršovci, Přemyslids and Slavníks took part in cruel power struggles that occurred in Bohemia on the turn of the first millennium. Vršovci and Přemyslids led by Boleslaus II, fought with the rival princely clan of Slavníks. On 28 September 995 they stormed Libice nad Cidlinou in Central Bohemia and conquered the Slavníks. Among the victims were four or five brothers of future catholic saint Adalbert, then bishop of Prague. According to the legends the saint was very impulsive. He damned the murderers (Vršovci). However, as some legend says the saint knew how to moderate "the horse of his anger" in order to not "deviate from a bright way of the eternal life" so he escaped from Bohemia to Hungary and Poland, also legend says that he predicted the prosecution of Vršovci.

In 1003, the Vršovci tried to dethrone Boleslaus III. When the expatriated duke returned to Bohemia possibly with the support of Duke Boleslaus IV (Bolesław I the Brave of Poland), he ordered a massacre of the Vršovci at Vyšehrad. According to Thietmar of Merseburg, Boleslaus slashed to death his son-in-law (Vršoviec) with his own sword during Lent.

In 1108 the Vršovci came into disfavour again, and were massacred by hostile Přemyslids—namely Svatopluk. Many nobles were executed on Petřín Hill.

=== Possible further shelter or interrelations ===
The later history of the family is unclear; there are two or more versions:

1. The whole family was perfidiously executed in 1109.
2. The same source suggests that it could have happened that some of them escaped to Kingdom of Poland and acted from there yet in 1100. Similarly, one of two versions by Kasper Niesiecki (considering origin of Polish Rawicz bearers) says that some of them were amiably accepted in 1108 by the King Bolesław III Wrymouth of Poland, who granted them lands in Rawa Voivodship; also Jan Długosz supports it (however the other version by Kasper Niesiecki – "the better one" is that the origin of Polish Rawicz bearers is pagan Polish).
3. Controversially, they may have been captured by Andalusian Muslims and used as saqaliba.

If the second is true, it could be that some of Vršovci (because phonetically similar surnames were spotted among szlachta of two Polish coat of arms), in the midst of nobility referred to as Oksza (Werszowic, Werszowiec, Wierszowiec) and Rawicz (Warsz, Warsza) bearers, probably participated in the Battle of Grunwald.

Polish Rawicz (Ursin) coat of arms

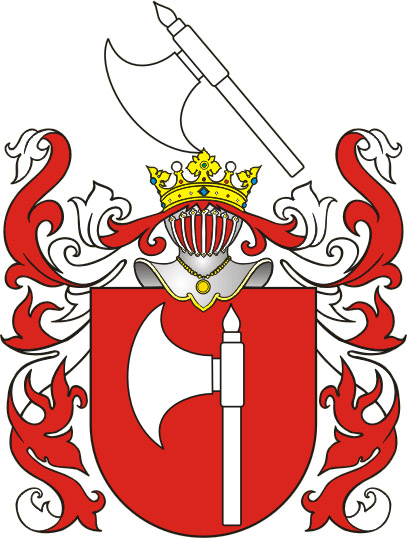
Polish Oksza coat of arms

In the historical records among 50 Polish "banners" (regiments) is one (the 26th) under the Rawicz coat of arms led by Christian of Ostrów, castellan of Kraków, also a war councillor and one of the seven chief members of King Władysław II Jagiełło of Poland's general headquarters.

Derslaw of Wlostow, of the arms Oksza, served as a scout and on the field of battle, and Peter of Wlostow, also of the arms Oksza, one of the knights selected by the Poles to initiate the battle. In addition, one of the Rawicz bearers, Christian of Goworzici, is marked for his military valour in the Battle of Koronowo, shortly after that of Grunwald. Oksza knights also participated at Koronowo, specifically Dobko Oksza and Jan Rey of Naglowic.

For the most famous Oksza bearer, see: Mikołaj Rej z Nagłowic. In 1994–97, Mikołaj Rej's descendant and namesake, Nicholas Andrew Rey (1938–2009), served as American ambassador to Poland.

== See also ==
- Thietmar of Merseburg. Chronicon;
- Cosmas of Prague. Chronica Boëmorum ("Chronicle of Bohemians");
- Jan Długosz. Annales seu cronici incliti regni Poloniae;
- Simon Okolski. Orbis Polonus. Kraków, 1641. V.2. 70–72 and 335–342;
- Simon Okolski. Orbis Polonus. Kraków, 1642. V.2. 581–602;
- Kasper Niesiecki. Herbarz, VIII, 97–99;
- Bartosz Paprocki. Biblioteka Polska. Herby rycerstwa polskiego; Kraków, 1584 (II ed. Kraków, 1858) 562–565;
- Josef Teige. Blätter aus der altböhmischen Genealogie. Slavnikiden /Die Vrsovcen /Die Herren von Lichtenburg. Damböck, 2005. ISBN 3-900589-45-3.
- Emilian von Zernicki-Szeliga. Die Polnischen-Stammwappen, Hamburg 1900, 58–59.
- Kopal, Petr. Neznámý známý rod. Pokus o genealogii Vršovců. Sborník archivních prací 2001/1, 3–84.
