= Congress of Gniezno =

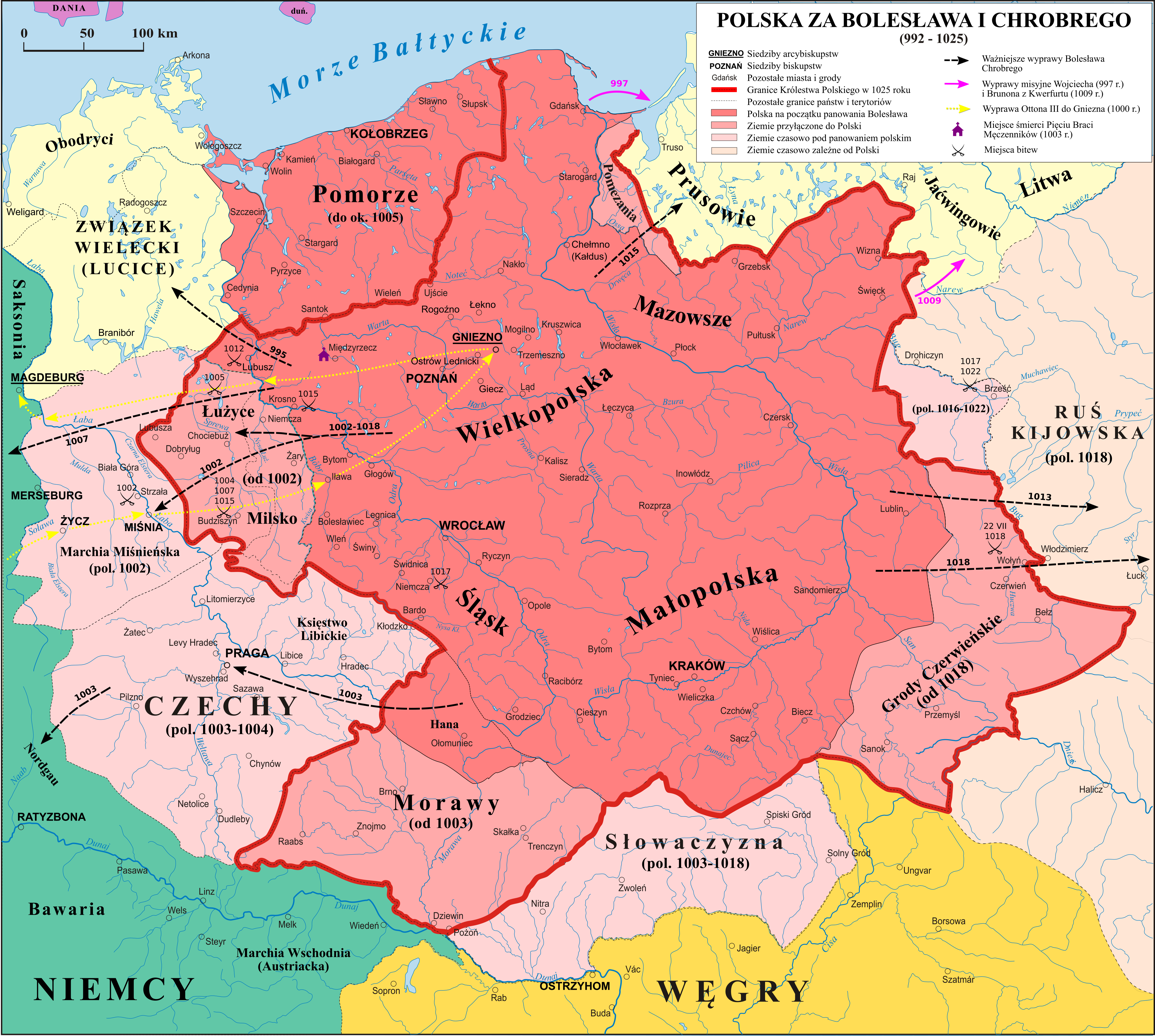
Poland during the reign of Bolesław the Brave and Emperor Otto's route to Gniezno.

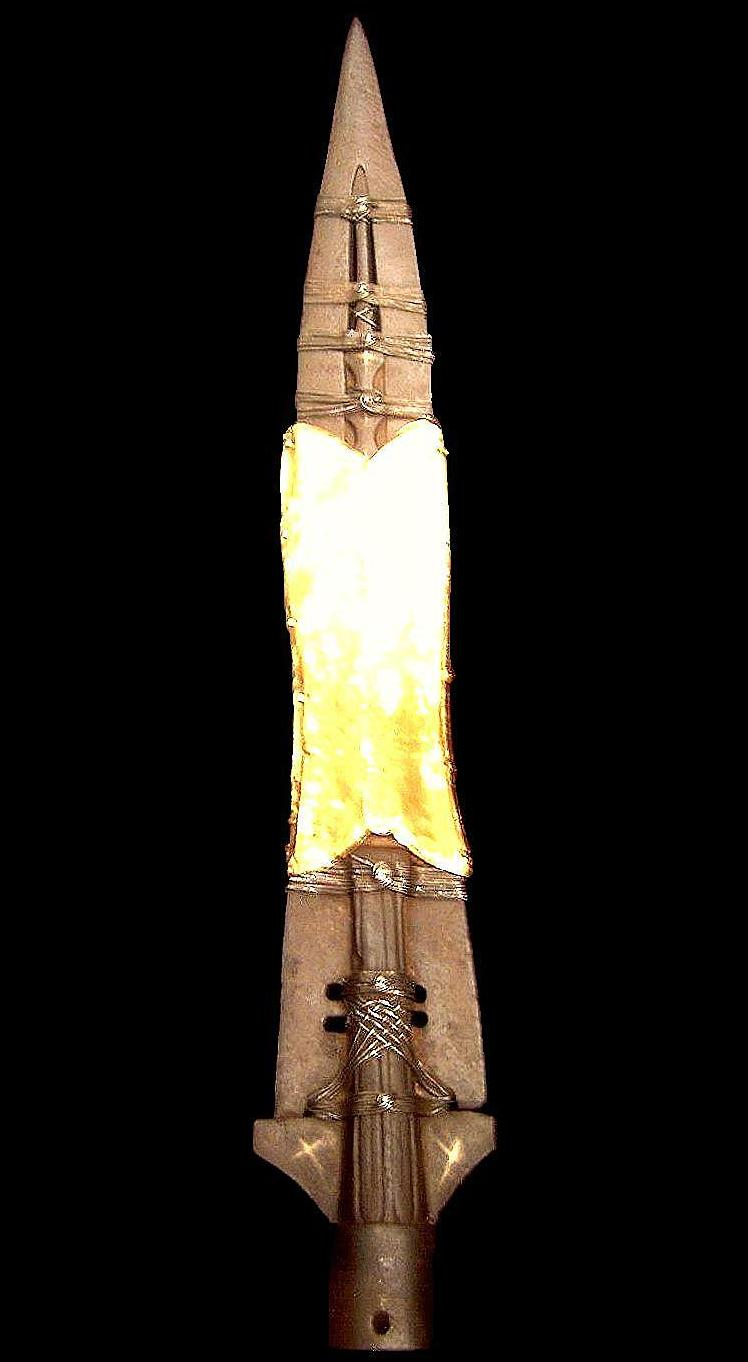
The spearhead of the Holy Lance, Imperial Treasury, Vienna

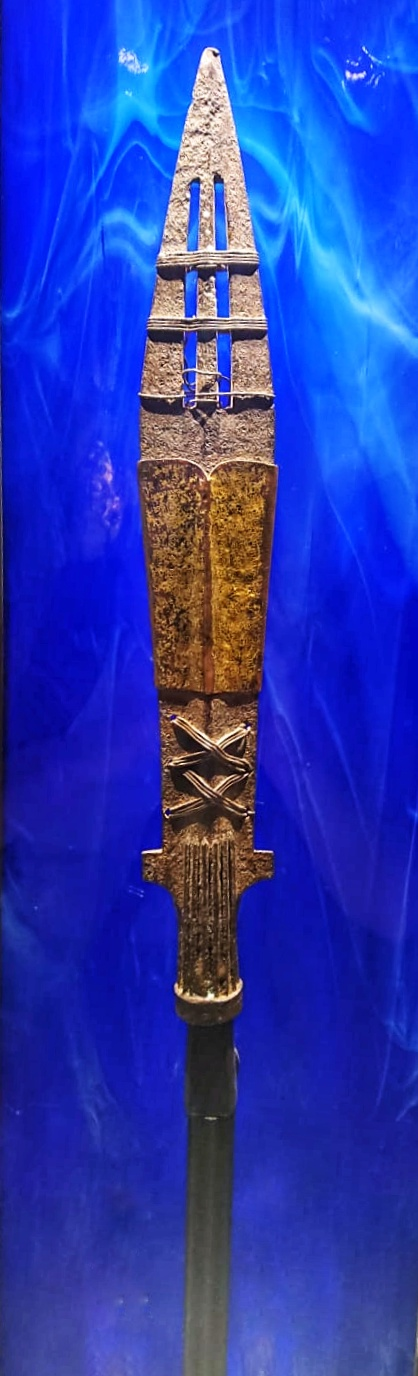
Polish replica of the Holy Lance, Wawel Hill, Kraków

The Congress of Gniezno (Polish: Zjazd gnieźnieński) was an amicable meeting between the Polish Duke Bolesław I the Brave and Emperor Otto III, which took place at Gniezno in Poland on 11 March 1000. Scholars disagree over the details of the decisions made at the convention, especially whether the ruler of Poland was pledged the king's crown or not.

== Background ==
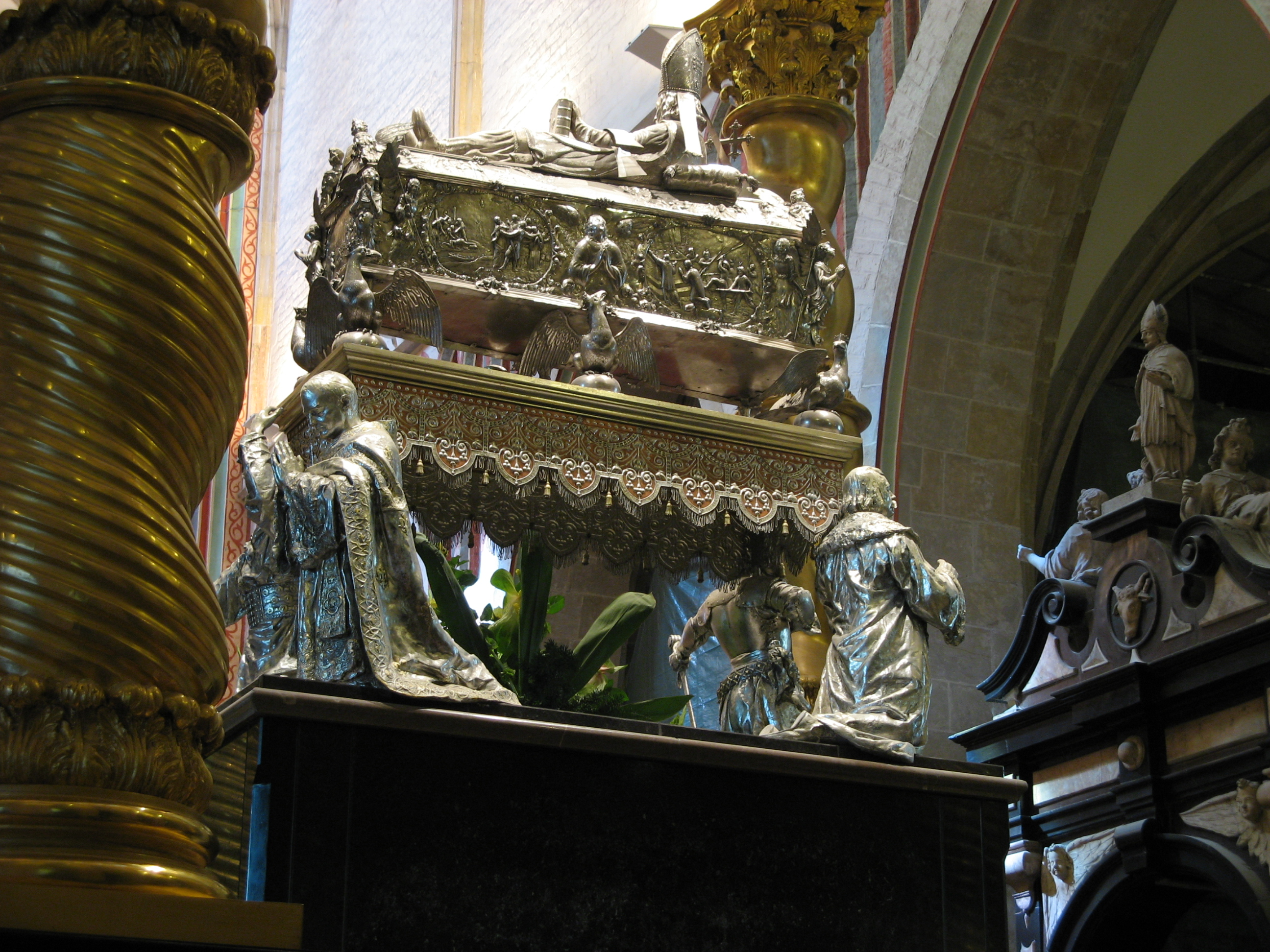
Silver relic coffin of St. Adalbert at Gniezno Cathedral

After his death in 997 during a mission among the pagan Prussian tribes, Bishop Adalbert of Prague was quickly canonized by the common effort of Duke Bolesław I and Emperor Otto III. Thus, Adalbert became the first Slavic bishop to become a saint. His body, bought back by Bolesław from the Prussians for its weight in gold, was put into a tomb at Gniezno Cathedral, which became the ecclesiastical center of Poland.

According to the chronicles of Thietmar of Merseburg, Otto III, who had been a friend and pupil of Adalbert, committed to a pilgrimage from Italy to St. Adalbert's tomb in Gniezno; in his attempt to extend the influence of Christianity in Central and Eastern Europe, and to renew the Holy Roman Empire based on a federal concept ("renovatio imperii Romanorum") with the Polish and Hungarian duchies upgraded to eastern federati of the empire. As part of this policy he also invested Grand Prince Stephen I of Hungary with the king's crown (the Crown of Saint Stephen).

The Polish Piast dynasty under Mieszko I had extended their domains beyond the Oder river, where their claims to power collided with the interests of the Saxon margrave Gero. After his defeat by Gero's troops in 963, Mieszko I decided to come to terms with Emperor Otto I and agreed to pay tribute for this part of his lands. In turn he gained the title of amicus imperatoris ("Friend of the Emperor") and the acknowledgment of his position as a Dux of Poland. He continued his policy of convergence with the Empire by marrying Oda, the daughter of the Saxon margrave Dietrich of Haldensleben, in 978 and by marrying his son Bolesław I to a daughter of Margrave Rikdag of Meissen. As a precaution however, shortly before his death in 992 he placed his realm (Civitas Schinesghe) under the protection of Pope John XV according to the dagome iudex regest.

When his son Bolesław succeeded him, Poland remained an ally of the Empire in the campaigns against the Polabian Lutici tribes. Emperor Otto II died at the age of 28 in 983. His widow Theophanu acted as regent for her son, also called Otto. In 996 Otto III was crowned as Holy Roman Emperor at Rome. By the time of the congress at Gniezno in AD 1000, he was 20 years old.

== The act ==
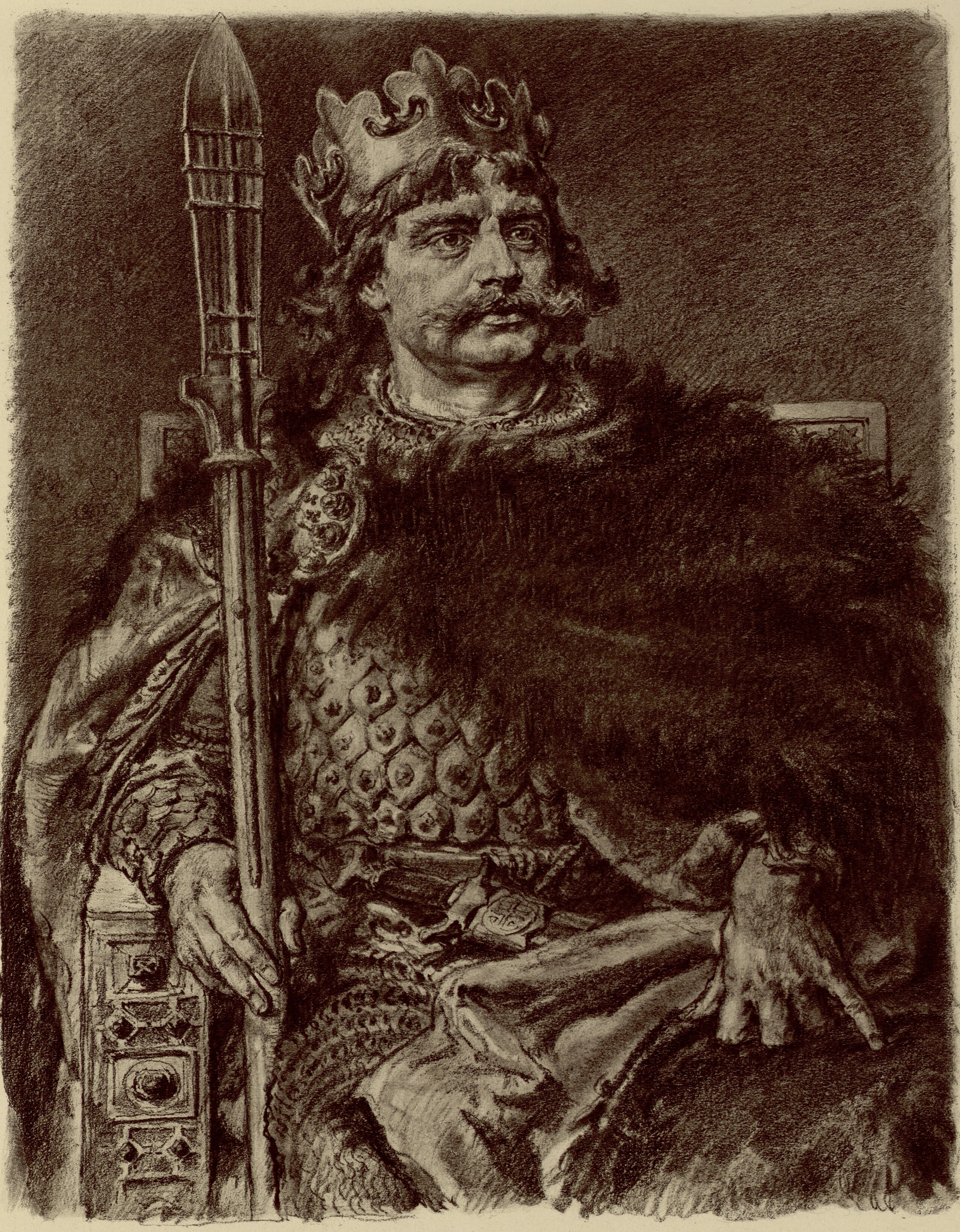
Portrait of Bolesław with the replica of the Holy Lance, Jan Matejko (1838–1893)

On the pilgrimage to Gniezno, Emperor Otto III was received by Bolesław at the Polish border on the Bóbr river near Małomice. Bishop Unger of Poznań escorted him to Gniezno. Between the 7th and 15th of March Otto invested Bolesław with the titles frater et cooperator Imperii ("Brother and Partner of the Empire") and populi Romani amicus et socius as rendered in the 1115 Gesta principum Polonorum by the Kraków chronicler Gallus Anonymus, the first author of Polish history. Whether the act implemented an elevation of Bolesław to the status of "king" has not been conclusively established. In any case, Bolesław had himself crowned King of Poland at Gniezno Cathedral in 1025.

On the same visit, Otto III raised Gniezno to the rank of an archbishopric. Three new dioceses subordinate to Gniezno were created: the Bishopric of Kraków (assigned to Bishop Poppo), the Bishopric of Wrocław (assigned to Bishop Jan) and the Bishopric of Kołobrzeg in Pomerania (assigned to bishop Reinbern). St. Adalbert's brother Radzim Gaudenty became the first archbishop of Gniezno. Otto III gave Bolesław a replica of his Holy Lance, part of the Imperial Regalia, and Bolesław presented the Emperor with a relic, an arm of St. Adalbert in exchange.

The status of the Bishopric of Poznań of Bishop Unger, whose diocese had also comprised Gniezno before and who had not supported the creation of a separate archdiocese in Gniezno, is also subject to historical debate. One view holds that it stayed independent and with Unger as a missionary bishop directly subordinate to the pope while another one holds that it was attached to the Archbishopric of Magdeburg, the nearest German ecclesiastical province. However, generally, the congress is seen as having established complete ecclesiastical independence of the Polish church from Magdeburg.

Bolesław subsequently accompanied Otto III on his way back to Germany. Both proceeded to the grave of Charlemagne at Aachen Cathedral, where Bolesław received Charlemagne's throne as a gift. Both arranged the betrothal of Bolesław's son Mieszko II Lambert with the Emperor's niece Richeza of Lotharingia.

== Aftermath ==
Due to Otto's early death in 1002, his renovatio policies were not fully realized. King Henry II, Otto's successor, changed the empire's policies. Bolesław supported Henry's rival, Margrave Eckard I of Meissen, expanded the Polish realm into the March of Lusatia and the Milceni lands, and also took the Bohemian throne at Prague, interfering with Henry's interests. During a meeting with Henry II in Merseburg, Bolesław was attacked by Henry's men and narrowly escaped with his life. As a consequence, the excellent relations between the Empire and Poland marked by the Congress of Gniezno turned into a state of hostility that soon emerged into a German–Polish War which finally ended with the 1018 Peace of Bautzen.

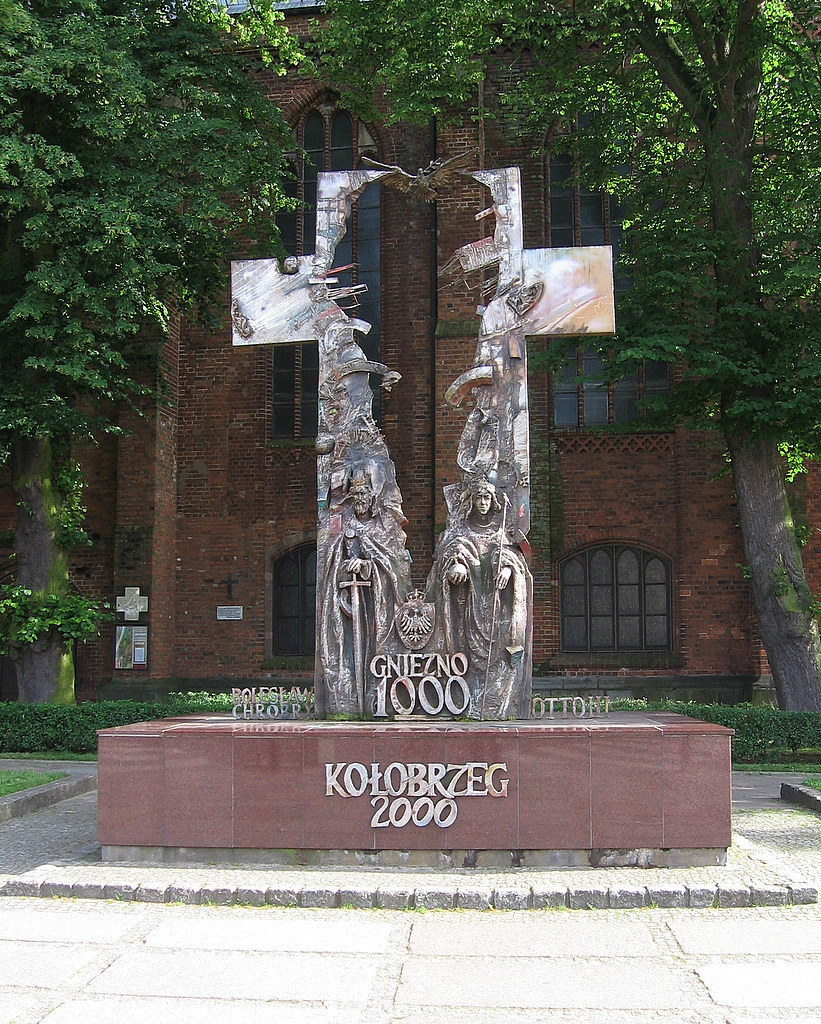
Memorial erected in 2000 at Kołobrzeg

It was not until Henry's death in 1024, that Bolesław was able to acquire the papal consent for his coronation as Polish king. The Pomeranian diocese of Kołobrzeg, founded as a consequence of the Congress of Gniezno, was overthrown by a pagan resurgence of the Pomeranians around 1007, and bishop Reinbern was forced to return to Boleslaw's court.

The creation of the separate Archdiocese of Gniezno, as directly subordinate to the Holy See rather than a German archdiocese, kept Poland independent from the Holy Roman Empire throughout the Middle Ages. Around 1075 the Bishopric of Poznań became a suffragan diocese of Gniezno. The archdiocese then controlled the whole Piast realm, as confirmed by the papal Bull of Gniezno in 1136.

== See also ==
- Germany–Poland relations
