= Slavník =

10th-century Bohemian noble

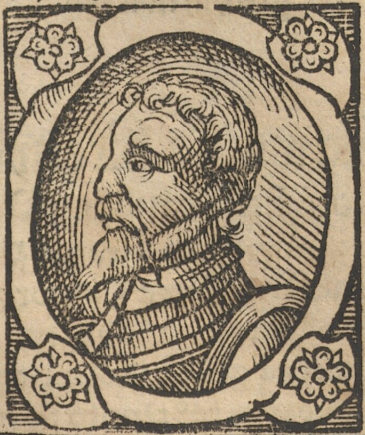
Portrait of Slavnik by Bartosz Paprocki, 1602.

Slavník (died 981) was a Bohemian nobleman, and the founder of the Slavník dynasty.

== Biography ==
Slavník rose to power during the reign of Boleslaus II of the Přemyslid dynasty. Slavník controlled significant estates within central Bohemia, and was overlord of the site of Libice nad Cidlinou.

== Family and issue ==
He had several children by his wife Střezislava. Six of his sons are known by name:

- Soběslav (his heir)
- Saint Adalbert
- Spytimír
- Pobraslav
- Pořej
- Čáslav

He had also a son named Radim Gaudentius by another woman (probably a concubine). According to Chronica Boemorum, Slavník was a happy man all his lifetime.
