= Soběslav (died 1004) =

Bohemian nobleman (c. 950 – 1004)

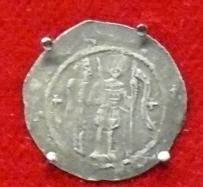
Coin minted by Soběslav

Soběslav or Soběbor (c. 950 – 1004) was a Bohemian nobleman, the brother of Saint Adalbert of Prague (Vojtěch), son of Střezislava and Slavník and a friend of Polish king, Boleslaus the Brave. He was equally powerful as the Přemyslid dynasty in his time, to whom he took a rather confrontational attitude. Even minting his own coinage, which had previously been the privilege of the Přemyslid court in Prague. Presumably the minting of coins began to take place after the episcopal election of Vojtěch. Likely in 995, fighting occurred between Slavník dynasty and Přemyslid dynasty soldiers. This prompted Soběslav to take his grudge against the Přemyslids to the Emperor. While he was in Germany, on the 27th or the 28th of September, Přemyslid soldiers attacked the Slavník stronghold of Libice nad Cidlinou killing all members of the Slavník dynasty present. Soběslav then took part in an Imperial expedition against pagan Slavs, and then went to Boleslaus the Brave to obtain sanctuary in Poland. In 1004, Soběslav led the Charváts tribe and died on a bridge over the Vltava river in Prague in a battle between a Polish force retreating after besieging Prague Castle, and an Imperial-cum-Bohemian expeditionary force.
