= Zlicans =

Slavic tribe

The Zliczans (Czech: Zličané, Zličani, Czech pronunciation: [ˈzlitʃanɛː]) was a Slavic tribe in early medieval Bohemia, divided by a river from the tribe of the Bohemians. They are mentioned in the Chronicle of Dalimil. In the 9th and 10th centuries their seat was in Kouřim. They likely held the Vyšehrad castle in their frontier. They were overpowered by the Přemyslid dynasty on 28 September 995, when the ruling Slavník dynasty was massacred by the Přemyslids.

== Dukes ==
- Radslav of Kouřim (early 10th century) who led a war against Wenceslaus I, Duke of Bohemia
