= Radslav of Kouřim =

Radslav (Czech: Radslav Zlický, Radislav Kouřimský) was the Duke of Kouřim, who, according to legend, waged war against Duke Wenceslas I of Bohemia. Wenceslas challenged him to a personal duel, but Radslav saw two angels beside Wenceslaus and didn't hurt him. He returned to Kouřim with his army. The story is recorded in the Chronicle of Dalimil. Radslav is a semi-legendary person, maybe the brother of Vok, Slavník's mythic father.
