= Radim Gaudentius =

Polish archbishop (c. 970 – c. 1020)

His Excellency Radim Gaudentius
- Archbishop of Gniezno
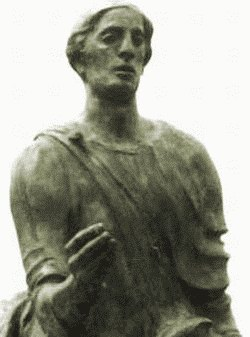
- Church: Roman Catholic, Orthodox Church
- Archdiocese: Gniezno
- Installed: 1000
- Term ended: before 1022
- Successor: Hippolytus

Personal details
- Born: 960–970 Libice nad Cidlinou
- Died: 1006–1018 Gniezno
- Buried: St. Vitus Cathedral

Radim Gaudentius (Czech: svatý Radim, Polish: Radzim Gaudenty; c. 970 – c. 1020) was Archbishop of Gniezno and the first Polish archbishop.

== Background ==
Radim was an illegitimate son of Bohemian nobleman Slavník, and thus the half-brother of Adalbert of Prague. In 989, the two journeyed to Rome where they joined the Benedictine monastery of Sts. Boniface and Alexius on the Aventine, with Radim adopting the name Gaudencius or Gaudentius. He accompanied Adalbert on his fatal journey to Prussia in 997.

Surviving the mission fatal to his half-brother, back in Rome he related the events of the journey to Abbot John Canaparius, who wrote a biography of Adalbert, and worked to promote his canonization.

Historians are not certain with regards to his date of death, suggesting a range of 1006 to 1022. His date of birth is also an estimate, in the range of late 960s to early 970s.

In Czech Republic he is commemorated as Saint Radim in the national liturgical calendar with an optional memorial on Oct. 12. Commemorated on January 5 in Orthodox Church.

Religious titles
| Preceded by none | Archbishop of Gniezno; 999–after 1000 | Succeeded by Hippolytus |
