= Adalbert of Prague =

Bohemian missionary and saint (c. 956 – 997)

Saint Adalbert of Prague
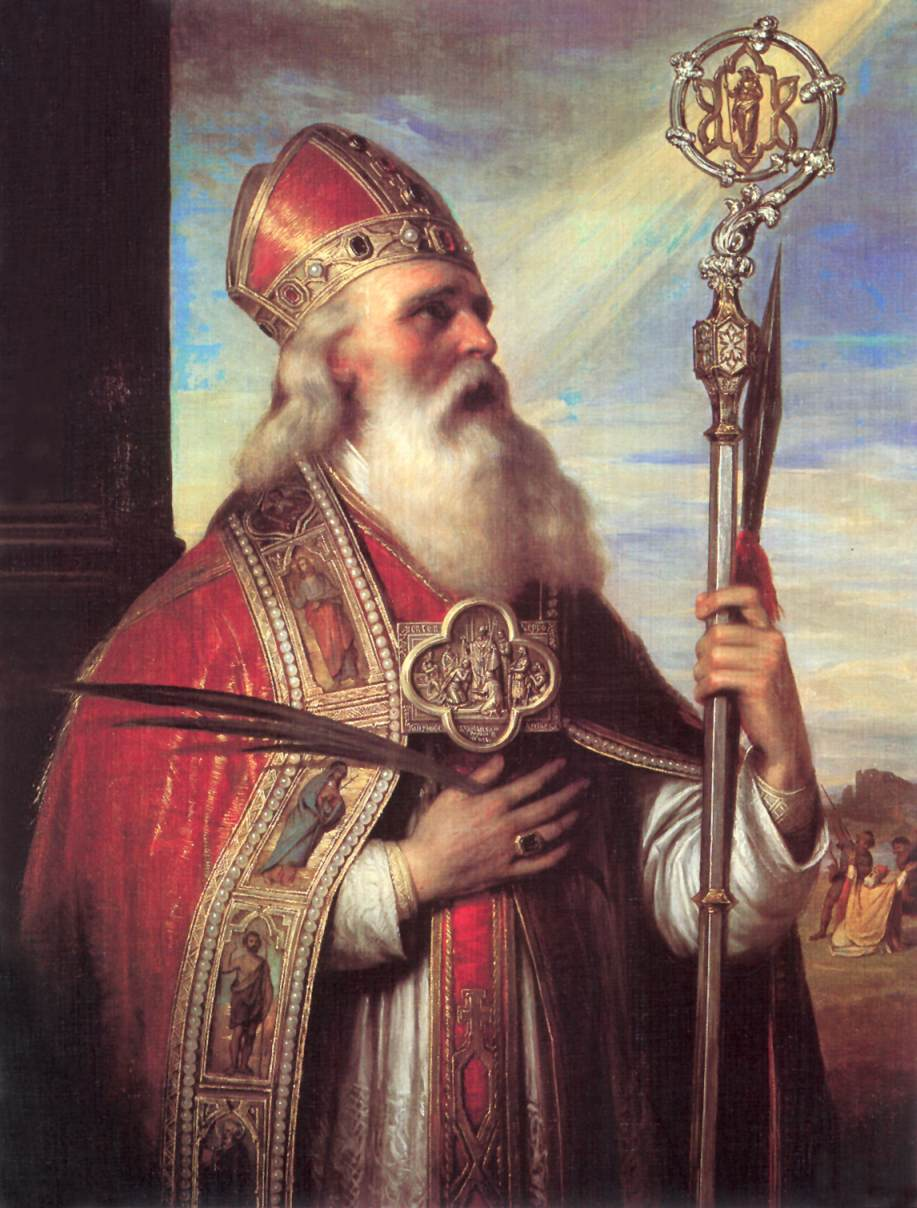
- Portrait by Mihály Kovács, 1855

Apostle of Bohemia Bishop and Martyr
- Born: c. 956; Libice, Duchy of Bohemia
- Died: 23 April 997 (aged 40–41); Święty Gaj, Poland
- Venerated in: Catholic Church; Eastern Orthodox Church
- Canonized: 999, Rome by Pope Sylvester II
- Major shrine: Gniezno, Prague
- Feast: 23 April
- Attributes: spears
- Patronage: Poland, Czech Republic, Archdiocese of Esztergom, Archdiocese of Prague (primary), students of Polish literature, Kaliningrad Oblast

Adalbert of Prague (Latin: Sanctus Adalbertus; Polish: Święty Wojciech; Czech: svatý Vojtěch; Slovak: svätý Vojtech; Hungarian: Szent Adalbert (Béla); c. 956 – 23 April 997), known in the Czech Republic, Poland and Slovakia by his birth name Wojciech or Vojtěch (Latin: Voitecus), was a Czech missionary, Bishop of Prague, martyr, and Christian saint. He adopted the name Adalbert after Adalbert, bishop of Magdeburg.

Although still young, Adalbert was made bishop of Prague in 982. Political conflict and opposition led him to withdraw to Rome in 990, but Pope John XV subsequently sent him back to his diocese, where he founded the abbey of Břevnov. Continued opposition forced him to return once more to Rome. He later undertook missionary work among the Hungarians, Poles, and Prussians, and was martyred in his efforts to convert the Baltic Prussians to Christianity.

Adalbert's influence remained extensive after his death. He was canonized in 999, and his feast day is celebrated on 23 April. He was later declared the patron saint of the Czech Republic, Poland, and the Duchy of Prussia, and is also the patron saint of the Archdiocese of Esztergom in Hungary. Adalbert has traditionally been credited with composing the oldest Czech hymn, Hospodine, pomiluj ny, and Bogurodzica, the oldest known Polish anthem, although his authorship of either work has not been confirmed.

== His life ==
=== Early years ===
Born as Vojtěch in 952 or c. 956 in gord Libice (today Libice nad Cidlinou, Czech Republic), he belonged to the Slavnik clan, one of the two most powerful families in Bohemia. Events from his life were later recorded by a Bohemian priest, Cosmas of Prague (1045–1125). Vojtěch's father was Slavník (d. 978–981), a duke ruling a province centred at Libice. His mother was Střezislava (d. 985–987), and according to David Kalhous belonged to the Přemyslid dynasty.

He had five brothers: Soběslav, Spytimír, Dobroslav, Pořej, and Čáslav. Cosmas also refers to Radim (later Gaudentius) as a brother; who is believed to have been a half-brother by his father's liaison with another woman. After he survived a grave illness in childhood, his parents decided to dedicate him to the service of God. Adalbert was well educated, having studied for approximately ten years (970–80) in Magdeburg under Adalbert of Magdeburg. The young Vojtěch took his tutor's name "Adalbert" at his Confirmation.

=== Episcopacy ===
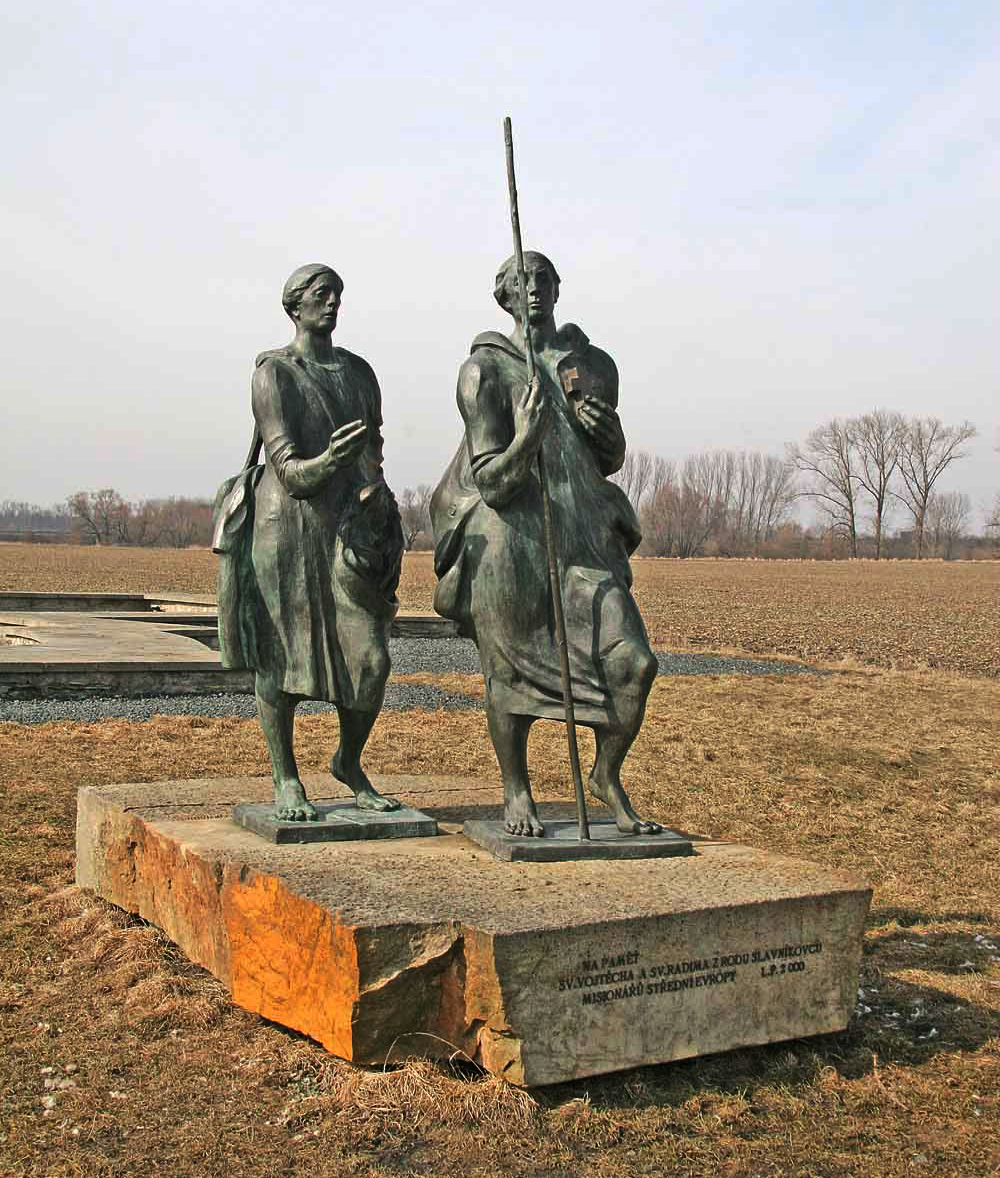
Monument to Adalbert and his brother Gaudentius, Libice nad Cidlinou, Czech Republic

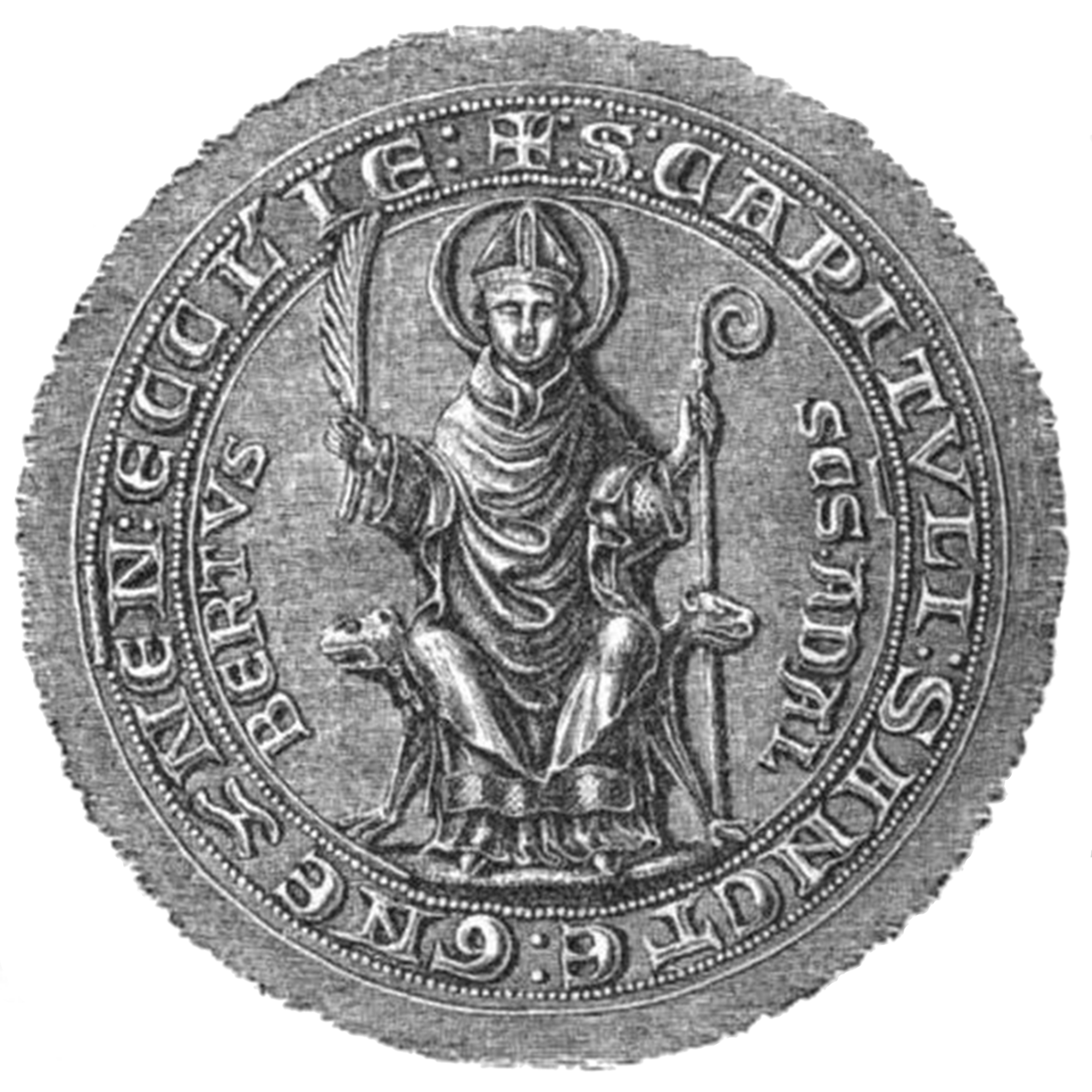
Adalbert on a seal of the chapter of Gniezno Cathedral (Gnesen)

In 981, Adalbert of Magdeburg died, and his young protege Adalbert returned to Bohemia. Later, Bishop Dietmar of Prague ordained him a Catholic priest. In 982, Bishop Dietmar died, and Adalbert, despite being under canonical age, was chosen to succeed him as Bishop of Prague. Amiable and somewhat worldly, he was not expected to trouble the secular powers by making excessive claims for the Church. Although Adalbert was from a wealthy family, he avoided comfort and luxury, and was noted for his charity and austerity. After six years of preaching and prayer, he had made little headway in evangelising the Bohemians, who maintained deeply embedded pagan beliefs.

Adalbert opposed the participation of Christians in the slave trade and complained of polygamy and idolatry, which were common among the people. Once he started to propose reforms, he was met with opposition from the secular powers as well as the clergy. His family refused to support Duke Boleslaus in an unsuccessful war against Poland. Adalbert was no longer welcome and eventually forced into exile. In 988 he went to Rome. He intended to go to Jerusalem, but instead he went to the monastery of Monte Cassino, and from there to the Benedictine monastery of Saint Boniface and Alexis on Aventine Hill, where he lived for two years.

In 992, the archbishop of Mainz, Willigis, who was the superior of the Prague diocese, demanded that Adalbert return to his episcopal see – which he did. Together with a group of Italian Benedictine monks which he brought with him, he founded in 14 January 993 a monastery in Břevnov (then situated westward from Prague, now part of the city), the second oldest monastery on Czech territory. However, after another unsuccessful attempt at Christianization, he returned to the Aventine in 995. Shortly after Adalbert's departure from Bohemia, Duke Boleslaus II the Pious murdered Adalbert's five brothers and destroyed their family seat in Libice. After this, Adalbert could not safely stay in Bohemia and escaped from Prague. Strachkvas was eventually appointed to be his successor. However, Strachkvas suddenly died during the liturgy at which he was to accede to his episcopal office in Prague. The cause of his death is still ambiguous. The Pope directed Adalbert to resume his see, but believing that he would not be allowed back, Adalbert requested a brief as an itinerant missionary.

After spending a year on the Aventine, Adalbert set out on a pilgrimage through France and Germany in June 996. Between September and November, he stayed at the court of Emperor Otto III. During this time, he was released from his duties as bishop of Prague and was free to devote himself to the Christianization of pagan lands as a missionary bishop. From the imperial court, he travelled to a place referred to in the sources as Mestris, which Gerard Labuda identifies as Pécsvárad (Mons Ferreus) in Hungary. He probably baptized there Géza of Hungary and his son Stephen in Esztergom. From there, in March 997, he went to the court of the Polish duke Bolesław Chrobry in Gniezno.

=== Mission in Prussia ===
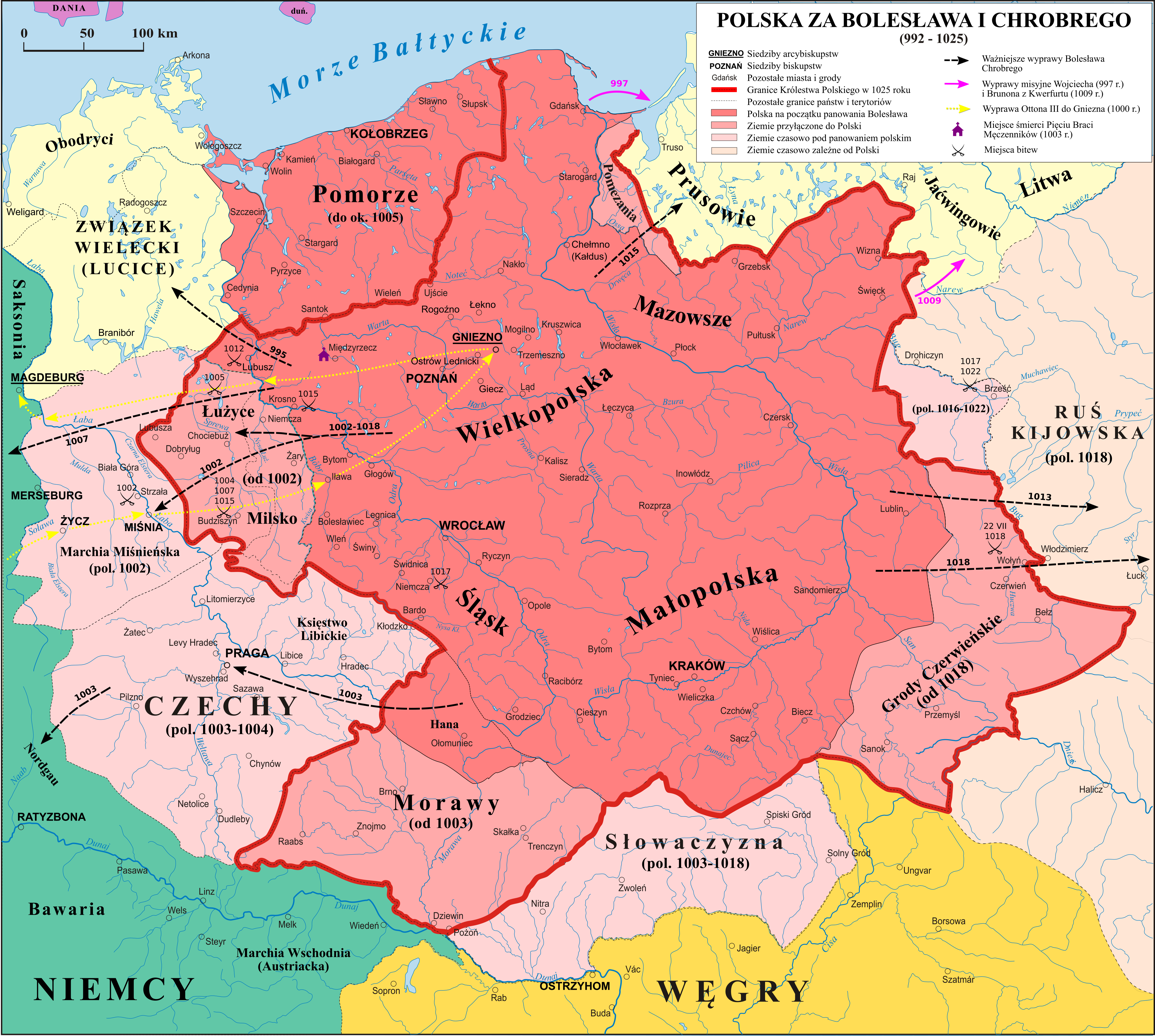
Poland, Bohemia and Prussia during the reign of Boleslaus I

Bolesław initially planned to send Adalbert on a mission to the Veleti, but this direction was deemed too dangerous. The Bishop and his companions entered Prussian territory and travelled along the coast of the Baltic Sea to Gdańsk. At the borders of the Polish realm, at the mouth of the Vistula River, his half-brother Radim (Gaudentius), Benedict-Bogusza (who was probably a Pole), and at least one interpreter ventured out into Prussia alone, as Bolesław had sent his soldiers only to escort them to the border. Around 8–9 April, Adalbert arrived in Gdańsk. There, he performed a baptismal ceremony on Sunday, 11 April. He arrived in Prussia on 17 April, most likely in the region of Pomesania.

Upon arriving in Prussia, Adalbert dismissed his escort and remained only with his brother Gaudentius and the priest Benedict on a small island surrounded by a river called "Ilfing" near its mouth into the sea. The 9th-century account by Wulfstan uses the name "Ilfing" to refer to the channel connecting the Vistula Lagoon with the lake on which the Prussian settlement of Truso was located. Gerard Labuda identifies this location with Lake Drużno, which flows into the Vistula Lagoon near present-day Elbląg. There, they encountered the Prussians, who did not welcome them warmly. They were taken to a market village, most likely Truso, located on the opposite bank. They spent the day there, and after a tribal assembly was held, they were deemed dangerous and ordered to leave, which they did on 18 April.

=== Martyrdom ===
The missionaries spent the following five days in a safe location, most likely on the Pomeranian side. From there, on 22 April, they crossed the river once again and set out toward another settlement called "Cholinun". Along the way, they passed through a forest and rested in a clearing, where they took a meal. According to Gerard Labuda, the settlement was the village of Pachoły (recorded in old sources as Bacculen, Bacolln, Bkollen, Pachollen), located on the Dzierzgoń River, which flows into Lake Drużno. Upon arriving at the settlement, Adalbert struck the gate, but since he was standing in a ditch, likely a dry moat, the guard told them to climb up to the hill. When the missionaries did so, one of the guards recognized them as the men previously expelled from the market settlement for bringing bad luck. According to the Passio from Tegernsee, the guard let out a "wild and strange cry," summoning the townspeople to the gate, where an interrogation of the newcomers began.

The inhabitants reacted with hostility, and their anger only grew due to Adalbert's demeanour; he "stood motionless, continuing to preach". The crowd began to stone him, and Adalbert collapsed to the ground. After that, the Prussians left them alone, and the missionaries withdrew from the site. The earliest hagiographies differ in the details of Adalbert's martyrdom. However, they agree that his death occurred after the group had left the settlement, that the wounds were inflicted solely on Adalbert and not on his companions, and that after his death, the bishop's head was cut off and impaled on a stake.

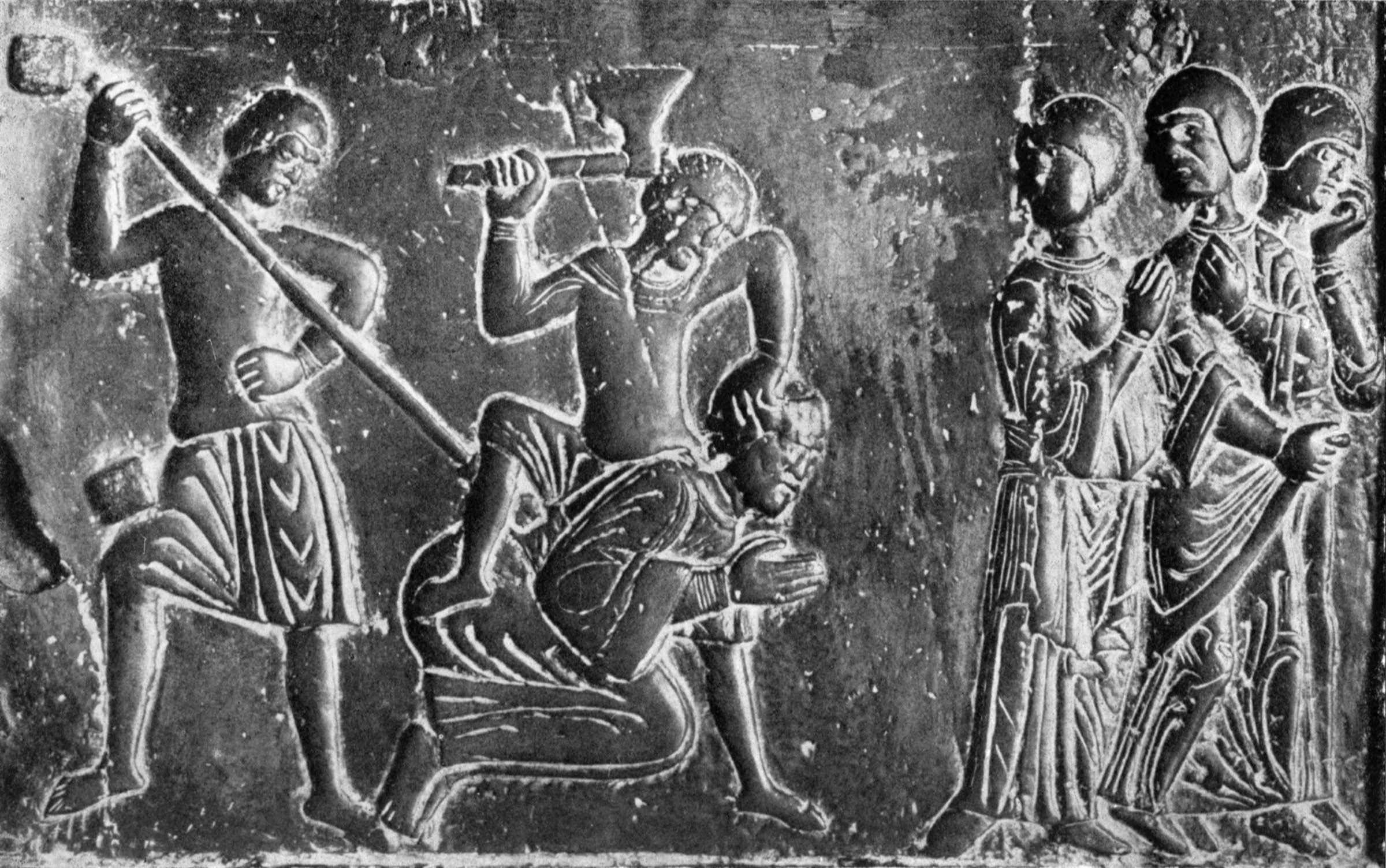
The execution of Saint Adalbert by the pagan Prussians, Gniezno Doors

The Vita attributed to Canaparius names the instigator of the killing as Sicco, a priest and leader of the group, who was the first to strike with a spear. Bruno of Querfurt's account adds that this Prussian leader had a brother who had been "killed by the Polans," suggesting a motive rooted in vengeance. According to the Passio from Tegernsee, the bishop died while praying, struck down by the first blow of an axe, which severed his head.

The reasons for Adalbert's death remain unclear to this day. None of the three oldest hagiographies provides them, as none of Adalbert's companions knew the motives behind the actions of the Prussians. The most probable interpretation is that Adalbert ignored the decision of the tribal assembly and returned to Prussian territory. Another potential interpretation is the imperious manner with which he preached, but potentially because he preached using a book. The Prussians had an oral society where communication was face-to-face. To the locals, Adalbert reading from a book may have come off as a manifestation of an evil action. According to other interpretations, on their way to "Cholinun", the missionaries may have unknowingly passed through a sacred grove of the Prussians, thereby violating a taboo. This is suggested by the ritual nature of the murder and the leading role played by the pagan priest. Such an interpretation is supported by a later account from Adam of Bremen, who, in describing Adalbert's mission and martyrdom, notes that the Prussians did not allow Christians to enter their sacred forests.

This encounter may also have taken place in Tenkitten and Fischhausen (now Primorsk, Kaliningrad Oblast, Russia). It is recorded that his body was bought back for its weight in gold by Boleslaus of Poland.

== Veneration and relics ==
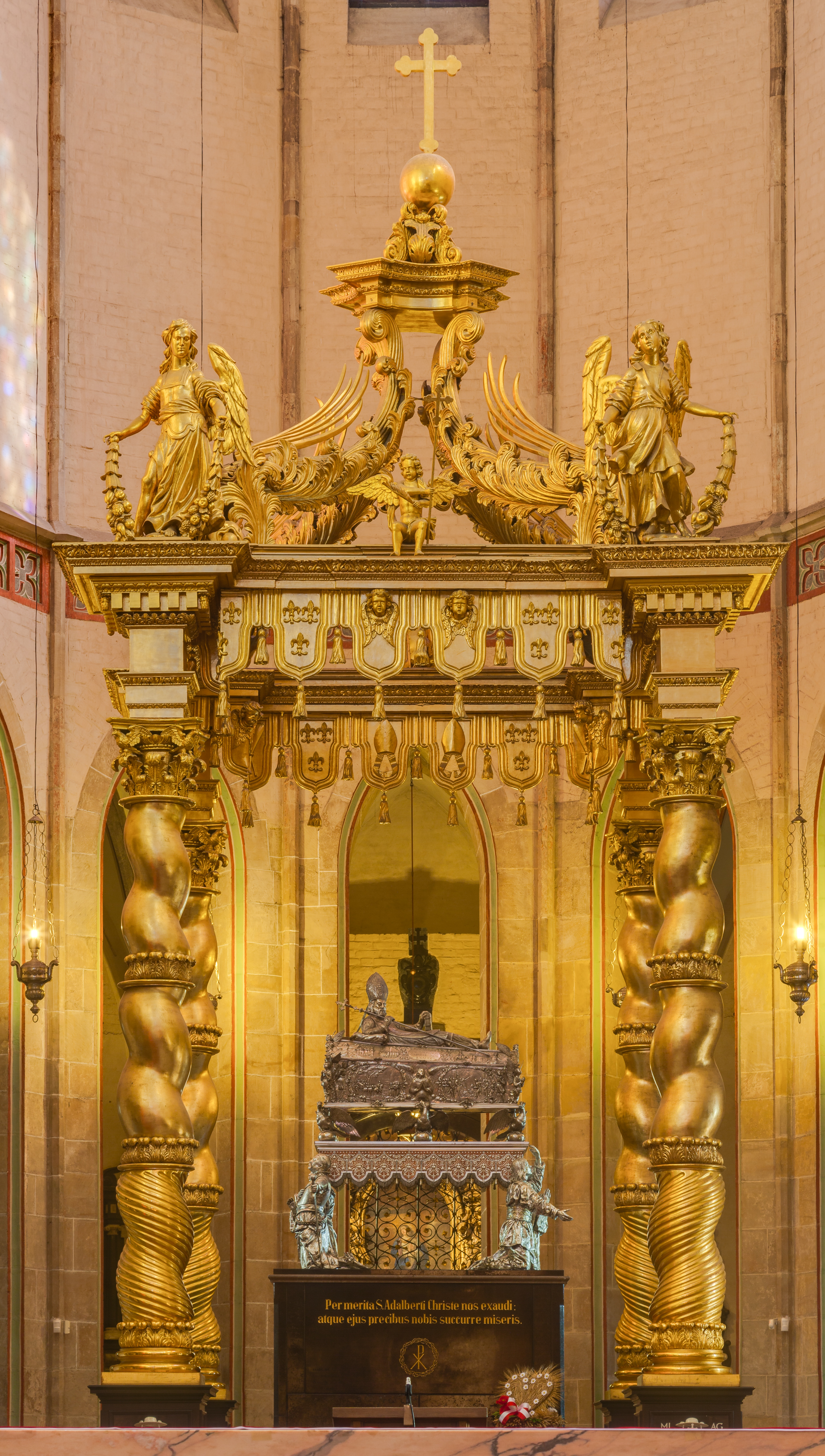
Silver coffin of Adalbert, Cathedral in Gniezno

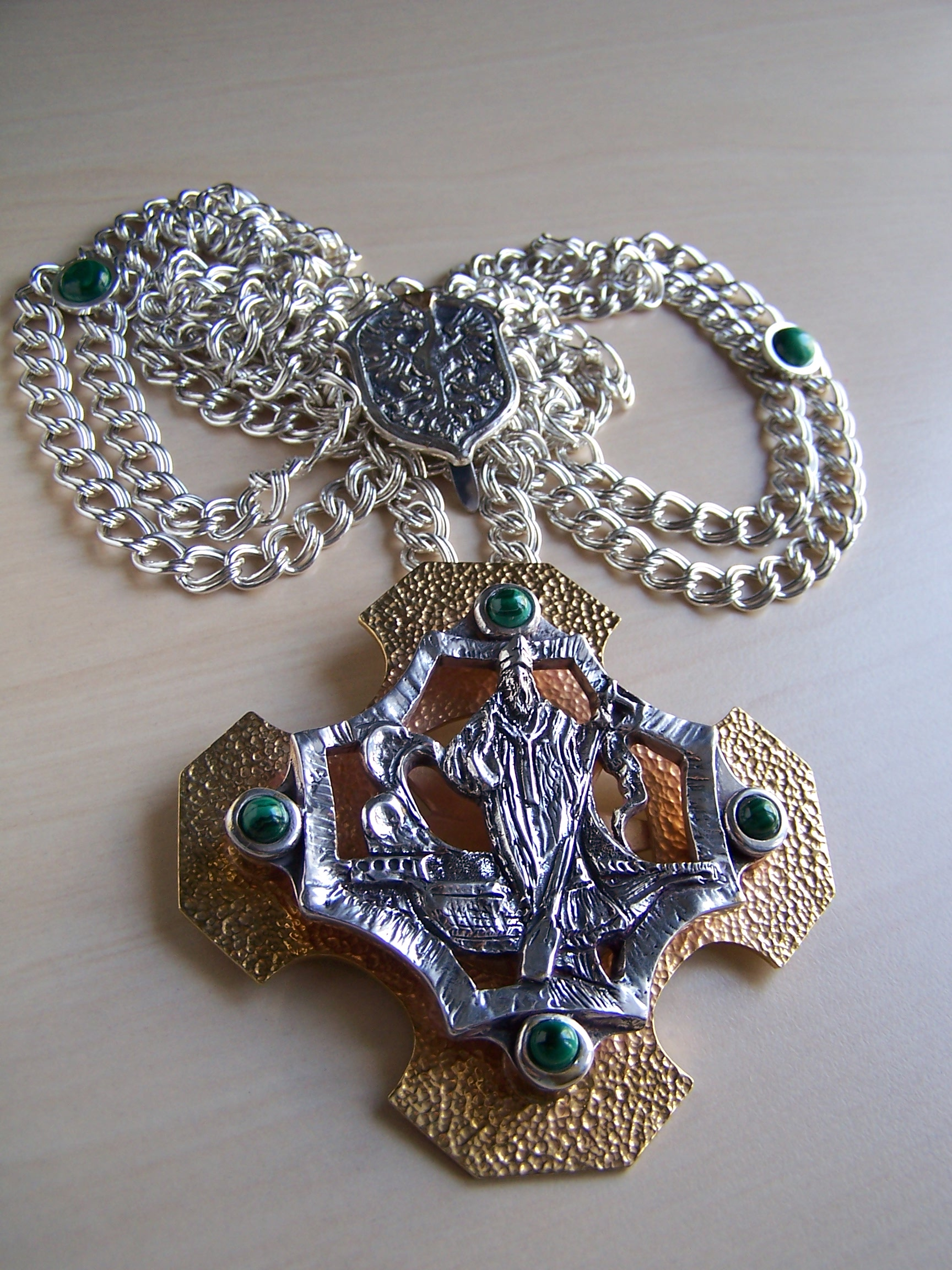
Canonical cross of Saint Adalbert by Giennadij Jerszow. Collegiate Capitol in Gdańsk. Silver-Gold 2011.

=== Canonization and initial veneration ===
Immediately after the death of Adalbert, his close friends and promoters of his cult, Emperor Otto III, Bishop Notker of Liège, and Duke Bolesław the Brave, began building churches and chapels dedicated to him. Notker did this in the capital of his bishopric, founding a church near the older Church of St. John the Evangelist. Bolesław the Brave founded the Church of St. Adalbert on the Warta River, opposite the cathedral located on the island. All the early sites connected with the cult of St. Adalbert shared a link to water, being located on islands or near bodies of water.

The main effort of Bolesław the Brave, however, was the pursuit of the canonization of St. Adalbert, undertaken immediately after the ransom of his body and its transfer to Poland. A key role in this was played by Radim Gaudentius, the martyr's brother and a witness to his death, who was sent to Rome, where, together with John Canaparius, he wrote the Vita sancti Adalberti (known as the Vita prior). Adalbert was most likely declared a saint on 29 June, 999, in Rome. Another famous biographer of Adalbert was Bruno of Querfurt who wrote a hagiography of him in two versions, the first written in 1004, the second in 1008 (known as the Vita altera). Around 1025, the third hagiography of the saint was created, known as the Passion from Tegernsee, from the Bavarian Benedictine abbey where the memory of Saint Adalbert was venerated.

Soon after the basilica in Gniezno, where the body of Adalbert was placed (according to legend it was held initially for some time in the monastery of Trzemeszno), was given the title of St. Adalbert's Church. The saint's brother, Radim Gaudentius, was ordained bishop in 999 and soon received the title of "Archbishop of St. Adalbert" with assignment to the church in Gniezno. This was a prelude to the elevation of Gniezno to the rank of archbishopric and the creation of a sovereign Polish ecclesiastical province, which took place in the year 1000. The establishment of the Polish metropolis, consisting of an archbishopric and four bishoprics, was supported by both the pope and the emperor. Otto III himself travelled to Gniezno to pay homage to the saint's relics and to preside over the synod that established the new metropolis.

Otto III received one of the arms of St. Adalbert from Bolesław the Brave. Right after the death of St. Adalbert, the emperor founded a large church in Aachen in Adalbert's honour, as well as others in Reichenau and Rome, along with chapels in Benedictine abbeys, including Monte Cassino in Affile. Now returning from Poland, possibly accompanied by Duke Bolesław, he left some of the relics in Aachen. Later he went to Italy and was spreading the cult of the new saint along the way. In the year 1001, Otto III established a church dedicated to St. Adalbert north of Ravenna, at the hermitage of St. Romuald in Pereum, today near the town of Sant'Alberto. A monastery developed around it, intended for Christian missionary work in Slavic lands. A finger of the saint was placed by the emperor there. Otto III then went to Rome and deposited an arm relic of St. Adalbert in the church he founded in his name on Tiber Island.

Most of the relics that remained in Poland were placed in Gniezno. According to later legend, the second arm of the saint was transferred to Trzemeszno, but this is unlikely since the monastery there was founded only in the 12th century. Other smaller fragments may have been relocated to churches that were being established in Poland at that time. Between 1001 and 1010 some relics were transferred to Esztergom and possibly to Bamberg.

=== Theft of relics ===
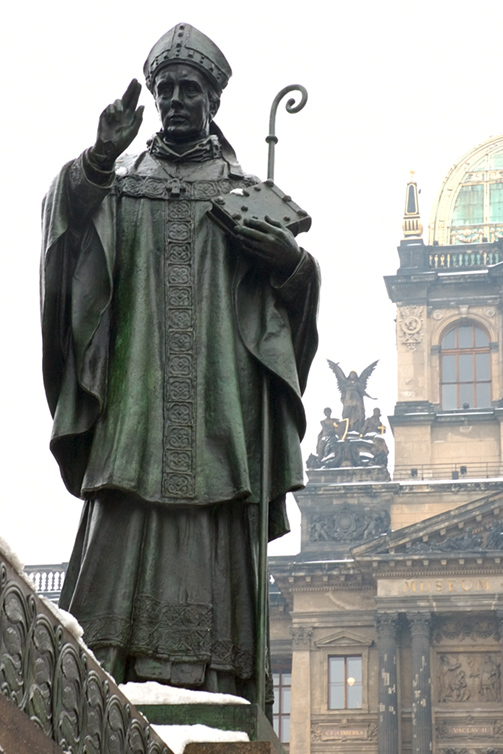
Statue of Saint Adalbert in Prague

After the death of King Mieszko II, the Polish state fell into a state of decline, which his son and successor, Duke Casimir, was unable to quickly halt. This situation was exploited by the Czech Duke Bretislav I, who invaded and plundered Kraków, Giecz, and Gniezno. In the latter city, his main target was the relics of St. Adalbert, as indicated by the participation of the Prague bishop Severus in the expedition. Czech soldiers broke the altar in the cathedral, behind which the relics had been walled in. According to Cosmas' account, they also took from Gniezno the remains of Radim Gaudentius, buried next to Adalbert, as well as the relics of the Five Martyred Brothers, which were buried in another church in Gniezno. The fate of the latter remains uncertain, as according to the account of Peter Damian, they were not in Gniezno, but in Kazimierz. The relics of St. Adalbert were then solemnly brought into Prague on 24 August 1038. A set of legal regulations was promulgated over the grave of St. Adalbert in Hnězden by Czech Duke Bretislav I, which is known as Břetislav's decree (also known as the Hnězden Decree).

For their actions, the Czech duke and the bishop of Prague brought upon themselves the wrath of Pope Benedict IX, who threatened them with excommunication. Ultimately, as a form of penance, he ordered them to establish a monastery. German King Henry III demanded that Poland return the looted treasures, then invaded and subjugated Bohemia. The relics, however, were not returned to Poland. They were deposited, likely together with the remains of Radim Gaudentius, in the collegiate church next to St. Vitus Cathedral at Prague Castle. The relics of the Five Martyred Brothers were placed in the newly founded monastery in Stará Boleslav. After the construction of a new, large cathedral on the site of the old one, the relics of St. Adalbert were transferred to it. The cathedral was dedicated to St. Vitus, St. Wenceslaus, and St. Adalbert. It was then that the cult of St. Adalbert as the patron saint of Bohemia began, strongly promoted by the chronicler and canon of the Prague chapter, Cosmas.

=== Veneration in Poland ===
The cathedral in Gniezno was rebuilt in 1064. The church organization was restored, and St. Adalbert continued to be regarded as the patron of the cathedral, the archbishopric, and the entire country. The chronicler Gallus Anonymus, describing the Polish forces fighting the Czechs in the year 1100, mentioned "the Gniezno troop dedicated to the patron of Poland.

Moreover, a growing belief emerged that some part of the relics had remained in Gniezno. In 1090, the feast of the "Translation of St. Adalbert" appeared in the liturgical calendar of the Gniezno Cathedral, likely related to the discovery of a hiding place containing either genuine or alleged relics, which were then moved behind the altar. In 1111, Duke Bolesław the Wrymouth captured and blinded his brother Zbigniew, who soon died. To atone for his guilt, the duke undertook a penitential pilgrimage to the tomb of St. Stephen in Hungary and the abbey of Somogyvár, concluding it at the tomb of St. Adalbert in Gniezno. He donated a pure gold reliquary to the cathedral.

The significance of the cult of St. Adalbert began to grow as the archbishops of Magdeburg increasingly asserted their claims to authority over the Polish ecclesiastical province. Bolesław the Wrymouth minted bracteates bearing the image of the saint. Bishop Otto of Bamberg, who led a Christianization mission in Pomerania with the duke's support, dedicated churches to St. Adalbert in Szczecin and Wolin. In 1127, the head of St. Adalbert was discovered in the Gniezno Cathedral. Several years later, in 1143, the bishop of Prague, Otto, likewise declared the discovery of the saint's head in the Prague Cathedral.

The massive bronze doors of Gniezno Cathedral, dating from around 1175, are decorated with eighteen reliefs of scenes from Adalbert's life. They are the only Romanesque ecclesiastical doors in Europe depicting a cycle illustrating the life of a saint, and therefore are a precious relic documenting Adalbert's martyrdom. We can read that door literally and theologically. Associated with the founding of the Gniezno Doors was the creation of a new Polish version of the saint's life, loosely based on earlier accounts but adding many new elements, some of them entirely fantastical. From its opening words, it is known as Tempore illo.

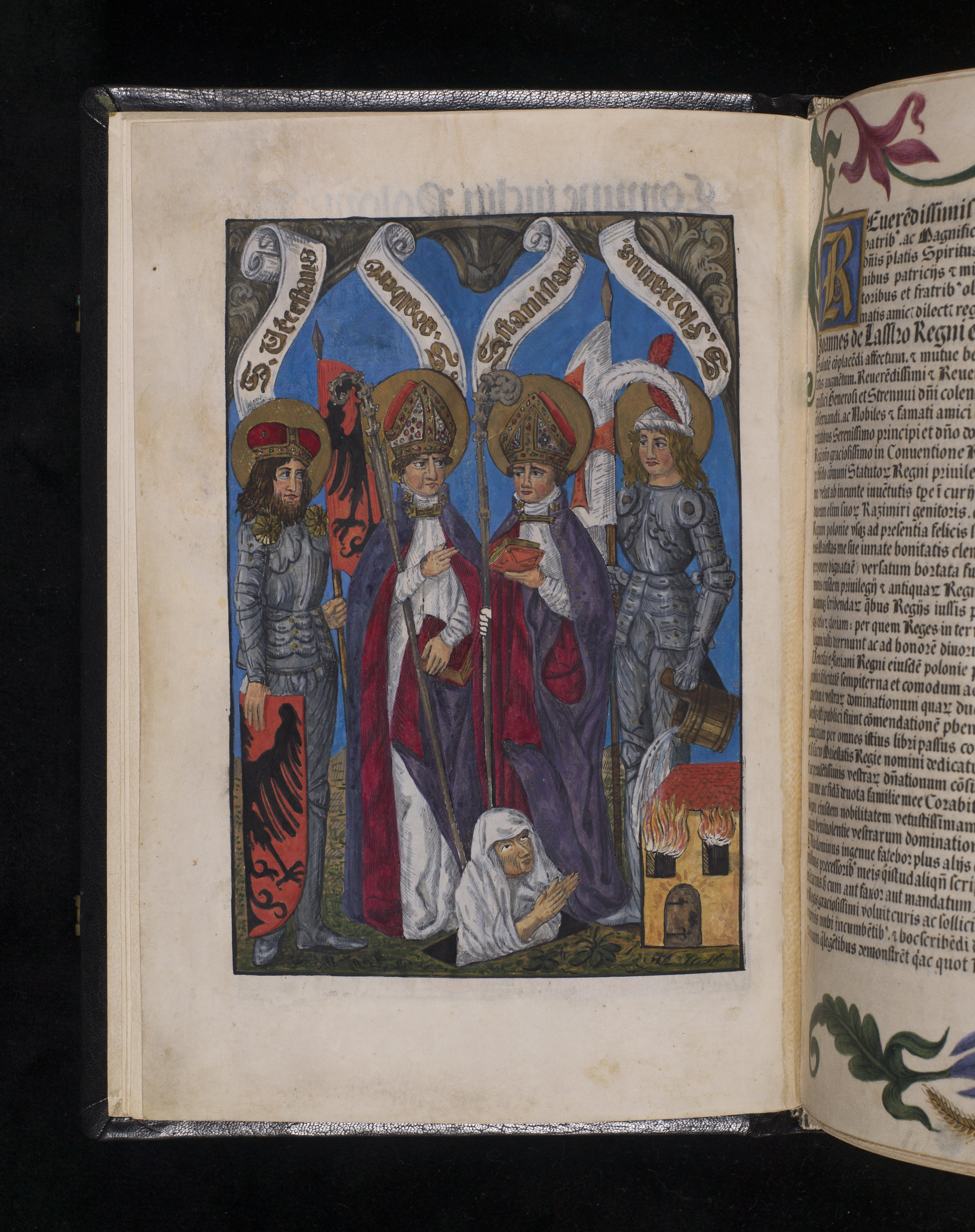
St. Wenceslaus, St. Adalbert, St. Stanislaus and St. Florian as the main saints of Poland in the 1506 codification of Polish law called Łaski's Statute

In the mid-13th century, the cult of Poland's second patron, Saint Stanislaus, the Bishop of Kraków who was killed on the orders of King Bolesław II, began to develop. The centre of this cult was Kraków, which competed with Gniezno, the centre of the cult of Saint Adalbert, for the title of the main spiritual centre of a unifying Polish state. The cult of Saint Stanislaus was more dynamic and richer in content. By the end of the 13th century, only the Legend of Saint Adalbert and The Miracles of Saint Adalbert had been created. In 1285, Archbishop Jakub Świnka called for every parish church and monastery in Poland to possess a written hagiography of Saint Adalbert, and for it to be read aloud and sung. After the unification of the state, Kraków gradually consolidated its dominance. The first Polish cardinal, Zbigniew Oleśnicki, promoted the vision of four patrons of Poland alongside St. Adalbert: St. Stanislaus, St. Wenceslaus, and St. Florian. The relics of the latter three were kept in Kraków Cathedral.

The cult of Saint Adalbert was revived in the 16th century, particularly during the Counter-Reformation, largely thanks to the immense popularity of Piotr Skarga's Lives of the Saints.

In 1928, one of the arms of Adalbert, which Bolesław I had given to Holy Roman Emperor Otto III in 1000, was added to the bones preserved in Gniezno. Therefore, today Adalbert has two elaborate shrines in the Prague Cathedral and Royal Cathedral of Gniezno, each of which claims to possess his relics, but which of these bones are his authentic relics is unknown. For example, pursuant to both claims, two skulls are attributed to Adalbert. The one in Gniezno was stolen in 1923.

The one thousandth anniversary of Adalbert's martyrdom was on 23 April 1997. It was commemorated in Poland, the Czech Republic, Germany, Russia, and other nations. Representatives of Catholic, Eastern Orthodox, and Evangelical churches travelled on a pilgrimage to Adalbert's tomb located in Gniezno. Pope John Paul II visited the cathedral and celebrated a liturgy there in which heads of seven European nations and approximately one million faithful participated.

A ten-meter cross was erected near the village of Beregovoe (formerly Tenkitten), Kaliningrad Oblast, where Adalbert is thought to have been martyred by the Prussians.

== Feast days ==
- 25 January – commemoration of translation of relics to Church of Saint Roch
- 22 April – commemoration in Diocese of Innsbruck,
- 22 April – commemoration in Catholic Church in England and Wales,
- 23 April – commemoration of death anniversary,
- 14 May – commemoration of consecration of church in Aachen
- 25 August – commemoration of translation of relics from Gniezno to Prague (1039)
- 26 August – commemoration of translation of relics to Wrocław
- 20 October – commemoration of translation of relics to Gniezno (1090)
- 22 October – commemoration of translation of relics to Gniezno
- 6 November – commemoration of translation of relics to Esztergom,

He is also commemorated on 23 April by Evangelical Church in Germany and Eastern Orthodox Church.

== In popular culture ==
The Dagmar and Václav Havel VIZE 97 Foundation Prize, given annually to a distinguished thinker "whose work exceeds the traditional framework of scientific knowledge, contributes to the understanding of science as an integral part of general culture and is concerned with unconventional ways of asking fundamental questions about cognition, being and human existence" includes a massive replica of Adalbert's crozier by Czech artist Jiří Plieštík.

St. Vojtech Fellowship was established in 1870 by Slovak Catholic priest Andrej Radlinský. It has facilitated Slovak Catholic thinkers and authors, continuing to publish original religious works and translations to this day. It is the official publishing body of Episcopal Conference of Slovakia.

== See also ==
- History of the Czech lands in the Middle Ages
- History of Poland (966–1385)
- Congress of Gniezno
- Gniezno Doors
- Adalbert of Magdeburg
- Saint Adalbert of Prague, patron saint archive
- Statue of Adalbert of Prague, Charles Bridge

== Sources ==
- Althoff, Gerd (2010). Otto III. Penn State Press. pp. 3, 14, 27, 49, 60, 65–71, 91, 96–97, 99, 127, 137–138, 141–143. ISBN 978-0-271-04618-1.
- Białuński, Grzegorz (2002). "O świętym Wojciechu raz jeszcze" [About Saint Wojciech once again]. Komunikaty Mazursko-Warmińskie. 2.
- Butler, Alban (2003). Butler's Lives of the Saints. Liturgical Press. pp. 181–. ISBN 978-0-8146-2903-1.
- Cosmas of Prague (2009). Wolverton, Lisa (ed.). The Chronicle of the Czechs. CUA Press. pp. 7–8, 15, 30, 49–50, 72, 75–83, 87, 96, 100, 107–109, 113–114, 117–120, 136, 156, 160, 176. ISBN 978-0-8132-1570-9.
- Dunin-Wąsowicz, Teresa (1982). "Wezwania św. Wojciecha w Europie zachodniej około r. 1000" (PDF). Studia Warmińskie. 19.
- Jezierski, Wojtek (2020). Udomawianie św. Wojciecha: Mitologizacja misjonarstwa i władzy biskupiej w Polsce i w Skandynawii, od XI do XIII w. Oryginalność czy wtórność? Studia poświęcone polskiej kulturze politycznej i religijnej (X−XIII wiek).
- Kalhous, David (2015). Legenda Christiani and Modern Historiography. BRILL. pp. 10, 16, 26, 32, 44, 46, 57, 60, 72, 91–92, 111, 114–115, 117, 119, 130. ISBN 978-90-04-30589-2.
- Labuda, Gerard (2000). Święty Wojciech. Biskup-męczennik, patron Polski, Czech i Węgier. Wrocław.
- Molnar, Enrico S. (30 April 1978). "St. Adalbert – Missionary to three countries". The Living Church. Morehouse-Gorham Company: 11–12.
- Siltek, Masza (2016). "The Threefold Movement of St. Adalbert's Head". Mediaevistik. 29: 143–174.
- Vlasto, A. P. (1970). The Entry of the Slavs Into Christendom: An Introduction to the Medieval History of the Slavs. CUP Archive. ISBN 978-0-521-07459-9.
