= Libice nad Cidlinou =

- Municipality
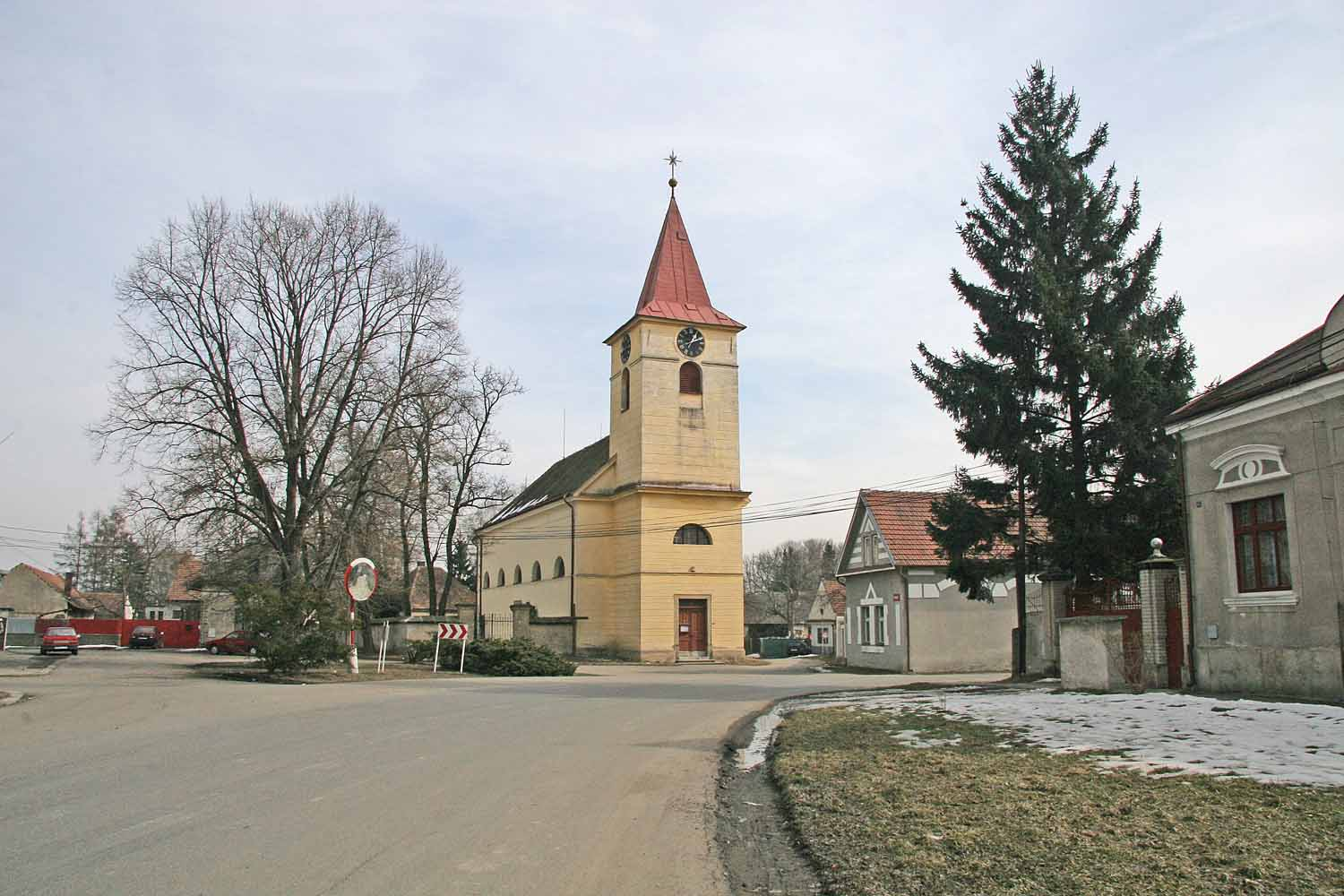
- Church of Saint Adalbert

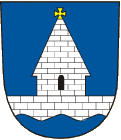
- Flag Coat of arms

- Location in the Czech Republic
- Coordinates: 50°7′37″N 15°10′42″E
- Country: Czech Republic
- Region: Central Bohemian
- District: Nymburk
- First mentioned: 981

Area
  - Total: 9.99 km^{2} (3.86 sq mi)
- Elevation: 190 m (620 ft)

Population (2026-01-01)
  - Total: 1,219
  - Density: 122/km^{2} (316/sq mi)
- Time zone: UTC+1 (CET)
  - Summer (DST): UTC+2 (CEST)
- Postal code: 289 07
- Website: www.libicenadcidlinou.cz

Libice nad Cidlinou (Czech pronunciation: [ˈlɪbɪtsɛ ˈnat tsɪdlɪnou]; German: Libitz an der Cidlina) is a municipality and village in Nymburk District in the Central Bohemian Region of the Czech Republic. It has about 1,200 inhabitants. It is located on the Cidlina River in the Central Elbe Table.

Libice nad Cidlinou is one of the oldest settlements in Bohemia. The area of the former Slavník gord from the 9th century is protected as a national cultural monument.

== Etymology ==
The name Libice (in Old Czech written as Ľubice) was derived from the adjective ľubý, meaning 'nice', 'pleasant' (village, fortress). The suffix nad Cidlinou means 'upon the Cidlina'.

== Geography ==
Libice nad Cidlinou is located about 12 kilometres (7 mi) southeast of Nymburk and 44 km (27 mi) east of Prague. It lies in the Central Elbe Table lowland within the Polabí region. The village is situated on the right bank of the Cidlina River, near its confluence with the Elbe.

== History ==
According to pottery finds, a Slavic settlement was established here in the 6th century. Libice emerged in the 9th century as the capital gord of the Slavník family. The first written mention of Libice is from 981 and relates to a mention from the Chronica Boemorum.

In 995, Libice was stormed by Bohemian Duke Boleslaus II (Přemyslid) and the Vršovci clan, who killed most of the Slavník family and annexed Libice to Prague. Adalbert of Prague and his brother, Archbishop Radim Gaudentius, survived by taking refuge in land of the Polans under rule of Boleslaus II.

In the 11th century, the gord survived and continued to function as an important administrative centre of Bohemia. In 1108, Božej of the Vršovci family lived here as a castellan. In 1130, Libice was destroyed by a large fire. The village was renewed, but the gord disappeared, and the stones from it served as building material for the villagers. According to deeds from 1228 and 1233, the village was then owned by the St. George's Convent in Prague. In 1336, the convent sold Libice to Ješek of Všechlapy.

== Demographics ==
Historical population

| Year | Pop. | ±% |
|---|---|---|
| 1869 | 657 | — |
| 1880 | 824 | +25.4% |
| 1890 | 842 | +2.2% |
| 1900 | 953 | +13.2% |
| 1910 | 1,081 | +13.4% |

| Year | Pop. | ±% |
|---|---|---|
| 1921 | 1,136 | +5.1% |
| 1930 | 1,239 | +9.1% |
| 1950 | 1,237 | −0.2% |
| 1961 | 1,500 | +21.3% |
| 1970 | 1,419 | −5.4% |

| Year | Pop. | ±% |
|---|---|---|
| 1980 | 1,390 | −2.0% |
| 1991 | 1,313 | −5.5% |
| 2001 | 1,294 | −1.4% |
| 2011 | 1,310 | +1.2% |
| 2021 | 1,190 | −9.2% |

Source: Censuses

== Transport ==
The D11 motorway from Prague to Hradec Králové runs through the municipality.

== Sights ==
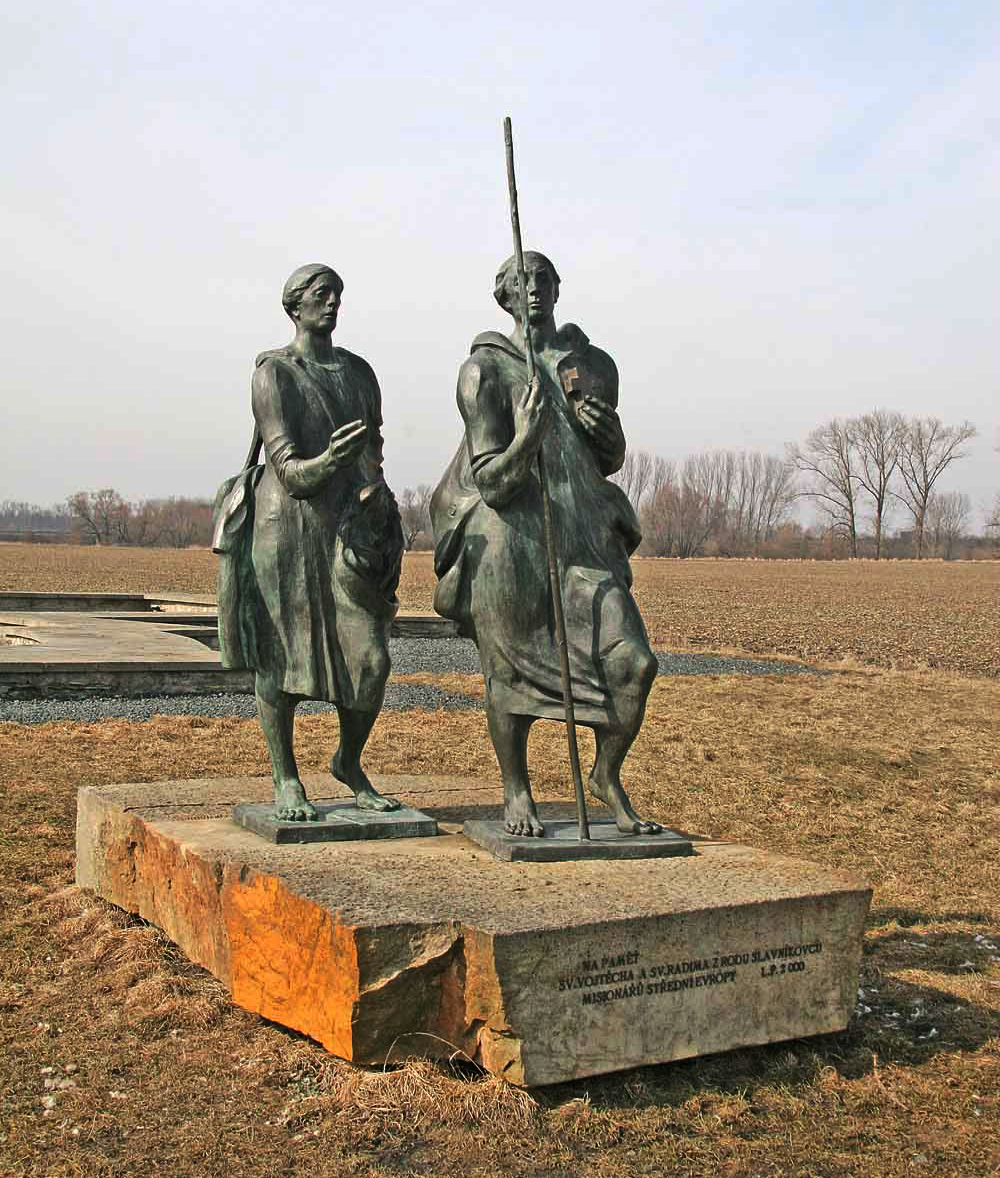
Statue of St. Adalbert and Radim Gaudentius

On the western edge of the village lies the area of Slavník gord with models of the foundations of the Ottonian church from the 10th century and the palace from the 11th century. A bronze statue of Saint Adalbert of Prague and Radim Gaudentius stands in front of the foundations of the church. In 1961, the area was declared an archaeological monument reserve. Since 1989, the acropolis of the gord has been a national cultural monument.

Other sights in Libice include the Church of St. Adalbert and the Evangelical church. The Church of St. Adalbert dates from the 14th century, but was rebuilt to its current form in 1836.

== Notable people ==
- Adalbert of Prague (c. 956 – 997), bishop, missionary and martyr
