= History of Christianity in the Czech lands =

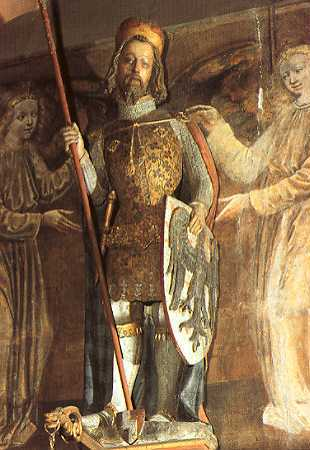
14th-century sculpture of Duke St Wenceslaus of Bohemia (Czech patron saint) in the chapel dedicated to him in St. Vitus Cathedral in Prague

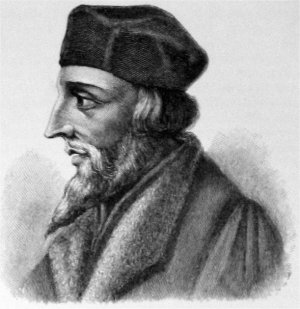
Jan Hus, 15th century religious reformer, later called "The Morning Star of Reformation"

The history of Christianity in the Czech lands began in the 9th century. Moravia was the first among the three historical regions of what now forms the Czech Republic whose ruling classes officially adopted Christianity, between the 830s and the 860s. In 845 Bohemian chieftains or duces also converted to the new faith, but it was just a short-lived political gesture (next year they returned to paganism). The real beginning of efforts to promote Christianity in Bohemian territory has to be placed in the period after 885. Moravia was the earliest center of the Old Church Slavonic liturgy after the arrival of Constantine (Cyril) and Methodius in 863, but their opponents, mainly priests of German origin, achieved the banishment of their disciplines in the 880s. Bohemia became the center of Christianization following the fall of Moravia in the early 10th century. Changes in burials and the erection of churches throughout the Czech lands demonstrate the spread of the new faith in the 10th century.

Two dioceses (the bishoprics of Prague and Olomouc) came into being by the end of the 11th century, but the system of local parishes only strengthened in the 12th century. The dukes and wealthy noblemen also set up a number of Benedictine, Cistercian, and Premonstratensian monasteries in the 11th and 12th centuries.

== Early Middle Ages (till 976) ==
=== Early Slavs (before c. 830) ===
Archaeological finds with close analogies in Ukraine – sunken huts with corner ovens, small cremation cemeteries, and "Prague pottery" – suggests that the first Slavic-speaking groups settled in the lands now inhabited by the Czech people in the second half of the 6th century. Almost all information on early Slavic mythology and cults derives from sources first recorded in the late 10th century. According to these sources, the Czechs' ancestors worshipped Perun, Veles, and other deities of the Slavic pantheon.

The remains of pagan cult sites, most of which have been excavated in Moravia, are "difficult to interpret." For instance, finds at a cemetery at Mikulčice which was in use from the late 8th century to the middle of the 10th century point at the existence of a rite connected to horse burials. The earliest inhumation graves, dated to the 8th century, were also unearthed in this region. Fortifications at Mikulčice, Staré Město, and nearby settlements proves that important centers of power existed in the valley of the river Morava.

Likewise around 800, strongholds were erected at Kouřim and other places in the Vltava river's valley in Bohemia. Charlemagne's biographer Einhard lists the "Bohemians" among the peoples with whom Charlemagne "had armed conflict." The heads or duces of the Bohemian tribes agreed to pay tribute to the emperor in 805 and 806. Bohemian and Moravian emissaries participated at the Diet of Frankfurt in the Carolingian Empire in 822.

=== Beginnings (c. 830–c. 906) ===
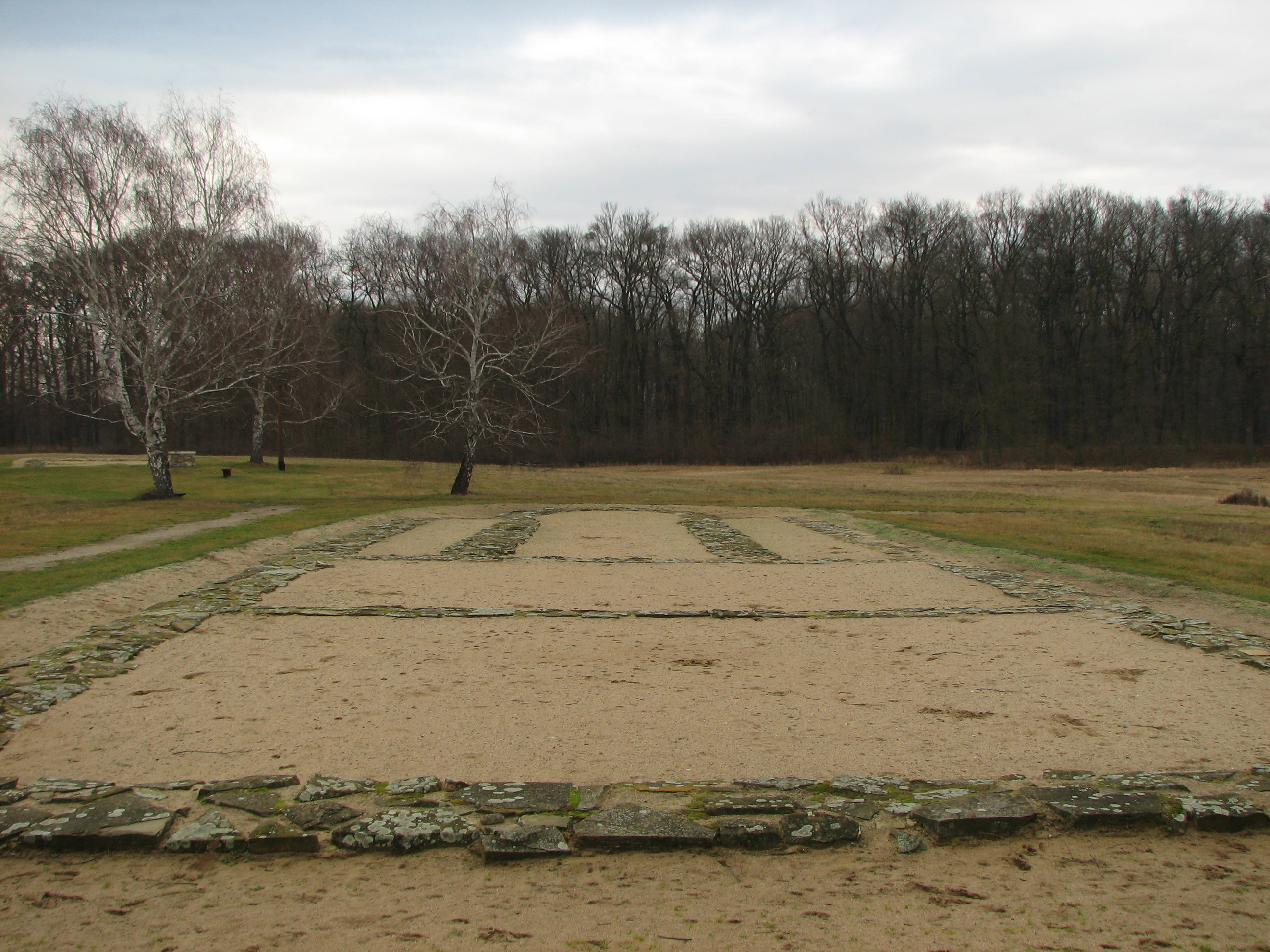
Remains of a 9th-century church at Mikulčice

The earliest Christian missionaries came to Moravia from the dioceses of Passau, Regensburg, and Salzburg. The Frankish aristocrats' way of life attracted the Moravian and Bohemian leaders who identified it with Christianity. The adoption of the new faith was initially the personal decision of individual aristocrats. Czech religious terminology also indicates the chieftains' preeminent role in Christianization. For instance, the Czech word for church (kostel) derived from Old High German kastel ("fortress") and the word for priest (kněz) from Common Slavonic kŭnędzĭ ("prince or chieftain"). Reginhar, bishop of Passau, baptized "all Moravians" and their prince, Mojmir I (r. c. 830–846) in 831, at least according to the Reports of the Bishops of Passau. Crosses from graves at fortresses suggest that most Moravian chieftains converted to Christianity by the 850s, but the Frankish prelates described the Church in Moravia as "coarse" at their synod of 852. Indeed, the pagan temple at Mikulčice which was in use till around 850 demonstrates that heathen cults survived the official adoption of the new faith.

No objects connected to Christianity which can be dated to the period before the mid-9th century have been unearthed in Bohemia. The Annals of Fulda writes of "fourteen of the duces of the Bohemians" who visited Louis the German in Regensburg where they were baptised "on the octave of the Epiphany," that is on January 13, 845. The Czech chieftains hoped that their conversion could contribute to maintain the peace with the Franks, because they soon returned to paganism after Louis the German invaded the Christian Moravia and dethroned Mojmir I in 846.

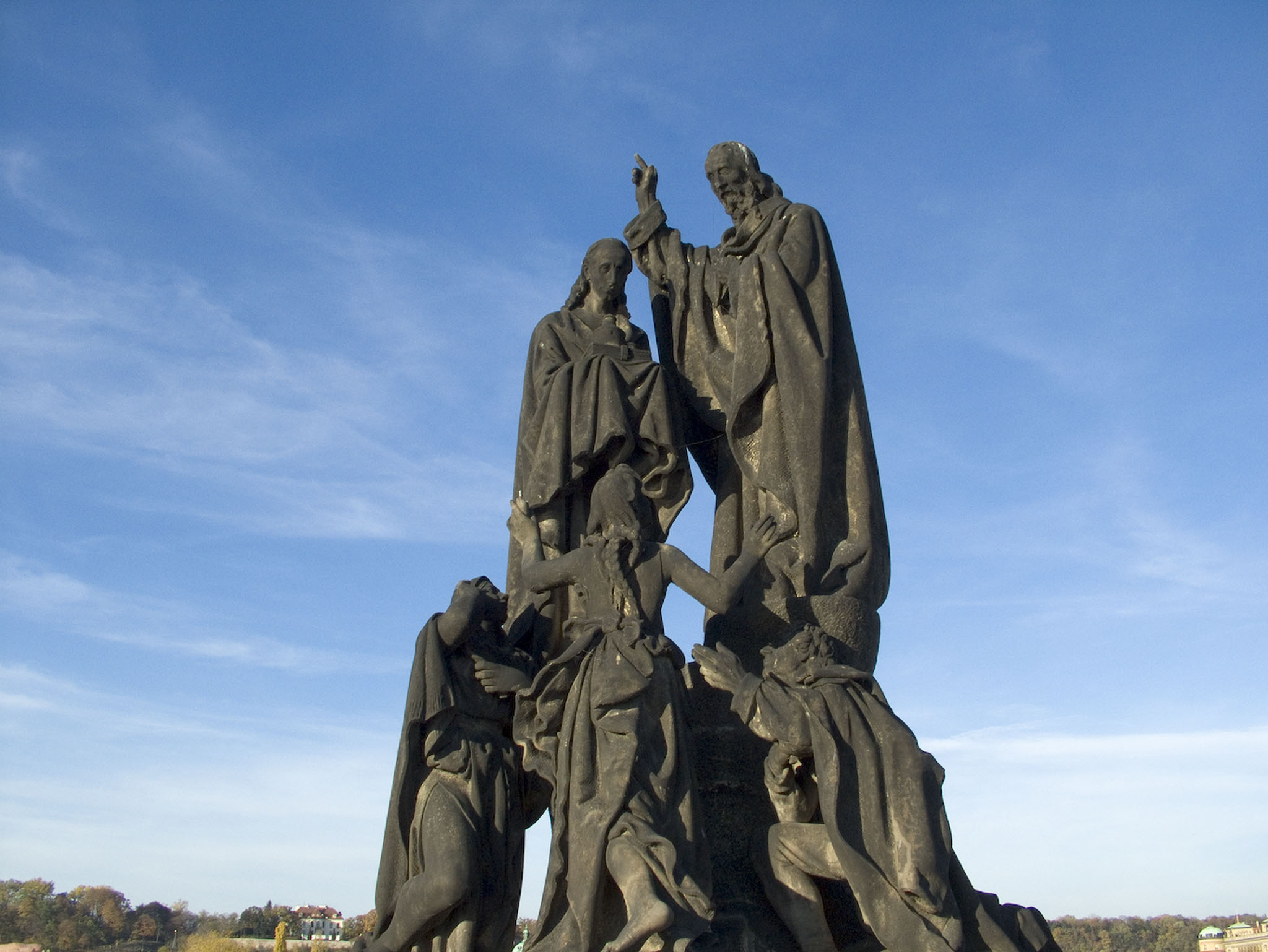
Sculpture of Saints Cyril and Methodius on Charles Bridge (Prague)

Mojmir I's nephew and successor, Rastislav (r. 846–860) turned to the Holy See to ask for missionaries in 860. However, his request fell on deaf ears, so he sent emissaries to Constantinople with the same task. The Byzantine Emperor Michael III sent two brothers, Constantine and Methodius, who were fluent in Slavic, to Rastislav's realm. They arrived in Moravia in 863 or 864. They used the vernacular not only in education but also in liturgy which enabled them to strengthen the local element of the clergy. Constantine even created a new script fitted to Slavic phonology.

The Byzantine missionaries' success caused conflicts with the Frankish prelates who accused the two brothers of heresy at the Holy See. On hearing this, Constantine and Methodius visited Rome where Pope Hadrian II sanctioned the use of Slavonic in liturgy and ordained their disciples as priests in 869. Constantine adopted the name Cyril and entered a monastery in Rome, but died on February 14, 869. Although the Pope consecrated Methodius as archbishop of Sirmium (Sremska Mitrovica, Serbia), he was arrested by German prelates on his travel from Rome. He only returned to Moravia after Pope John VIII had in 873 achieved his release. According to his Life, Methodius received jurisdiction over all churches, most of which were located in fortresses, in Moravia.

[The Moravians] sent to the Apostolic Father, saying. "Since our fathers once received Baptism from Saint Peter, give us Methodius as archbishop and teacher." And the Apostolic Father sent him at once. And Prince Svatopluk and all the Moravians received him. They entrusted to him all the churches and clergy in all the towns. And from that day forth, God's teachings grew greatly and the clergy multiplied in all the towns.

— The Life of Methodius

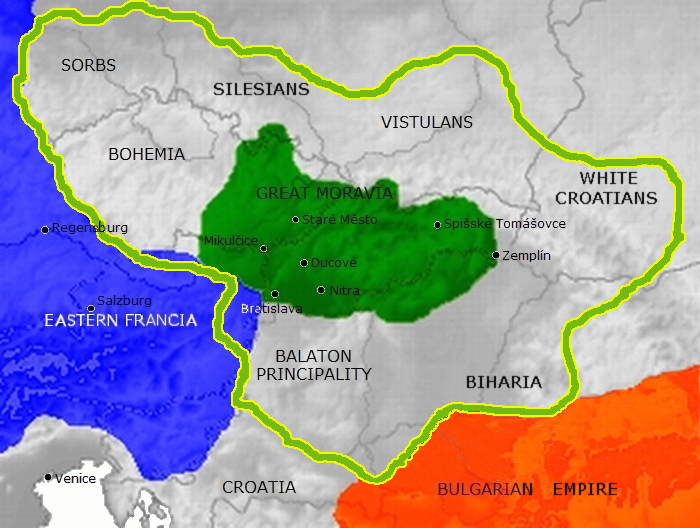
"Great" Moravia at its largest territorial expansion in the last year of Svatopluk I

Moravia underwent a significant territorial expansion in the reign of Svatopluk I (r. 869–894). The Bohemian dukes also accepted his suzerainty from the 880s. According to a legend which was first recorded in the Life of Václav and Ludmilla around 994, Methodius personally baptized a Bohemian duke named Bořivoj I (r. 872–889) who was the head of the emerging Přemyslid dynasty. The duke soon had a church erected at Levý Hradec, but his subjects who insisted on paganism rose up and expelled him. Assisted by Svatopluk I, Bořivoj I returned to Bohemia and defeated his enemies around 885. He had a new church built at Prague Castle.

Methodius died on April 6, 885. His opponents took advantage of his death and persuaded Pope Stephen V to forbid the use of the vernacular in liturgy. Svatopluk I soon expelled Methodius's disciples from his empire. Svatopuluk I died in 894. The Czechs soon rose up and accepted the suzerainty of King Arnulf of East Francia.

Pope John IX sanctioned the establishment of an archbishopric and four suffragan bishoprics in Moravia in 898 upon the request of Svatopluk I's successor, Mojmir II. However, no report of the actual consecration of new Moravian prelates has been preserved. Moravia finally disintegrated after the arrival of the Hungarians who conquered its core territory between 903 and 906. A heathen sanctuary built on the ruins of a Christian church at Pohansko suggests that traditional Slavic cults revived following the fall of Moravia.

=== Christianization (c. 906–976) ===
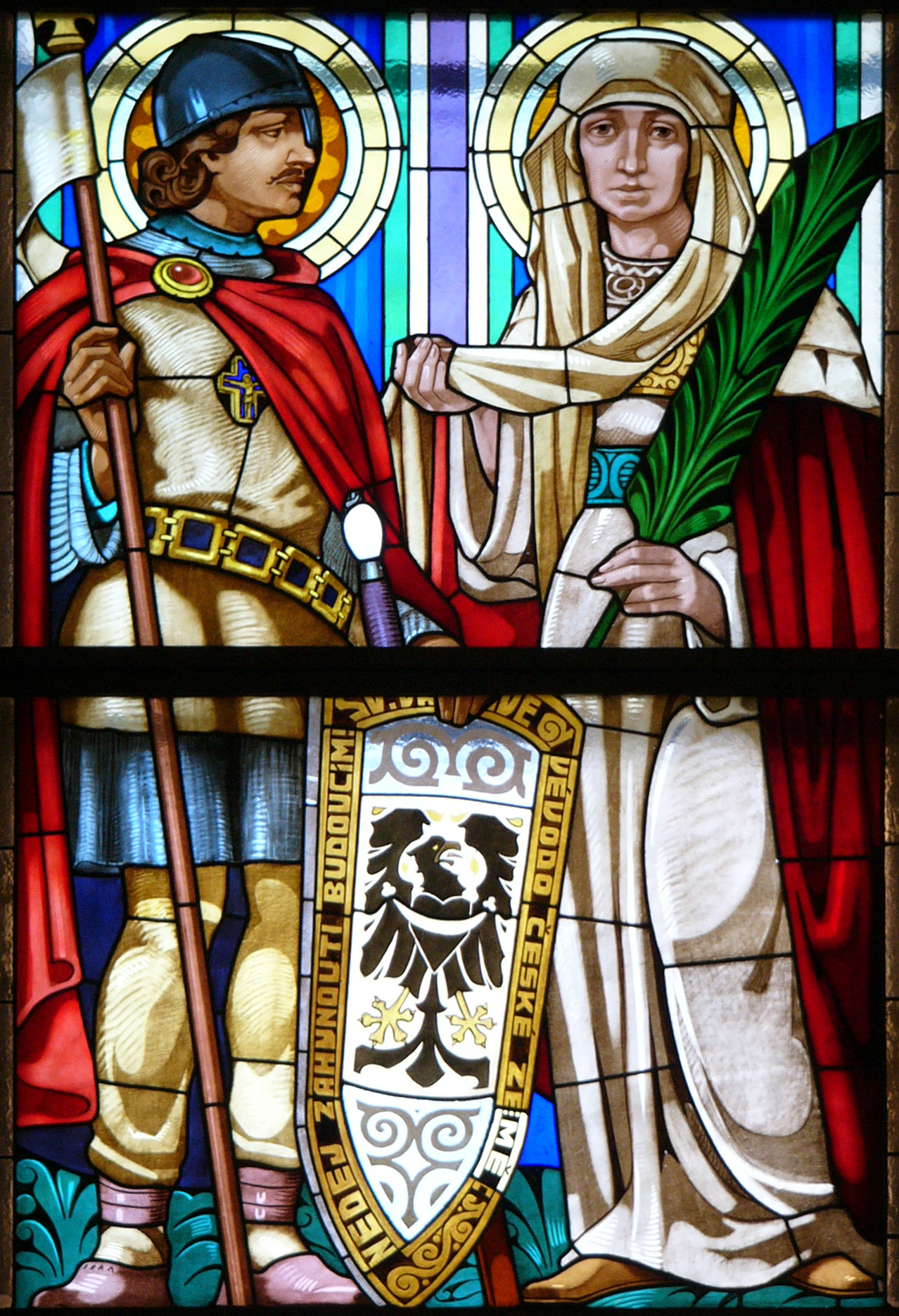
Saints Wenceslaus I and Ludmila depicted on a glass window in Sts. Cyril and Methodius's church in Olomouc

Spytihněv I, Duke of Bohemia (r. 894–915) played a preeminent role in the evolution of the Church organization. He had a number of fortresses erected which became important centers of both secular and ecclesiastic administration. The First Latin Legend of Wenceslas refers to a "greater priest" (maior presbyter) who seems to have represented the bishop of Regensburg in Bohemia. The same source states that Bavarian and Swabian priests arrived in the reign of Wenceslaus I (921–935), but many priests known from this period – including Krastĕj at Stará Boleslav and Učen at Budeč – bore Slavic names which implies that they came from Moravia.

Wenceslaus I's grandmother Ludmila became the first local saint. She had been murdered in 921 because of her conflicts with her daughter-in-law, Drahomíra (Wenceslaus's mother). Her cult began around 925 in the reign of her grandson. Wenceslaus I who was murdered by his own brother's servants also became a subject of veneration. He was regarded as "eternal prince" of Bohemia from the end of the century. The legends of Wenceslaus I and his grandmother are among the first works of local literature. The parallel use of Latin and Old Church Slavonic in a religious context is a remarkable feature of these texts. For instance, the earliest legend of Wenceslaus was written in Latin in the 960s, but its Old Church Slavonic version also appeared in short time.

Wenceslaus's brother Boleslaus I (r. 935–972) defeated a number of Bohemian dukes who opposed his rule, erected new fortresses all over Bohemia, and conquered significant parts of Moravia, Silesia, and other territories. Cosmas of Prague reports that Boleslaus I "built twenty churches for the Christian religion" in his reign. Churches from the second half of the century have been found at Dobřichov, Plzeň, and other settlements. The earliest churches in Bohemia were wooden constructions. The church dedicated to the Virgin at Prague Castle was the first to have been built of stone. Boleslaus I ordered that markets be held on Sundays in his forts in order to persuade his subjects to attend Sunday Mass. Pope John XIII authorized him to establish two bishoprics in his realm in 962, but Michael, Bishop of Regensburg, prevented the division of his diocese. Cosmas of Prague narrates that the Pope forbade Slavic liturgy in his letter to Boleslaus II, but the credibility of this report has been challenged.

Changes in burials reflect the spread of Christianity in Bohemia in the 10th century. The growing number of traditional tumuli used for inhumation instead of cremation demonstrates that pagan and Christian customs co-existed. Likewise, the custom of placing eggs or other foodstuffs in graves survived up until the early 11th century even in "row cemeteries" which appeared in the late 9th century.

Boleslaus II (r. 967–999) established a monastery (the St. George's Convent) for Benedictine nuns in Prague. Its first abbess Mlada was his sister, who represented him in his discussions with the Holy See on the establishment of the Czech bishoprics. The two dioceses, of Prague and Moravia, were finally set up in 975. Their bishops became suffragans of the archbishops of Mainz.

== Middle Ages (976–c. 1410) ==
=== Development of church structure (976–c. 1200) ===
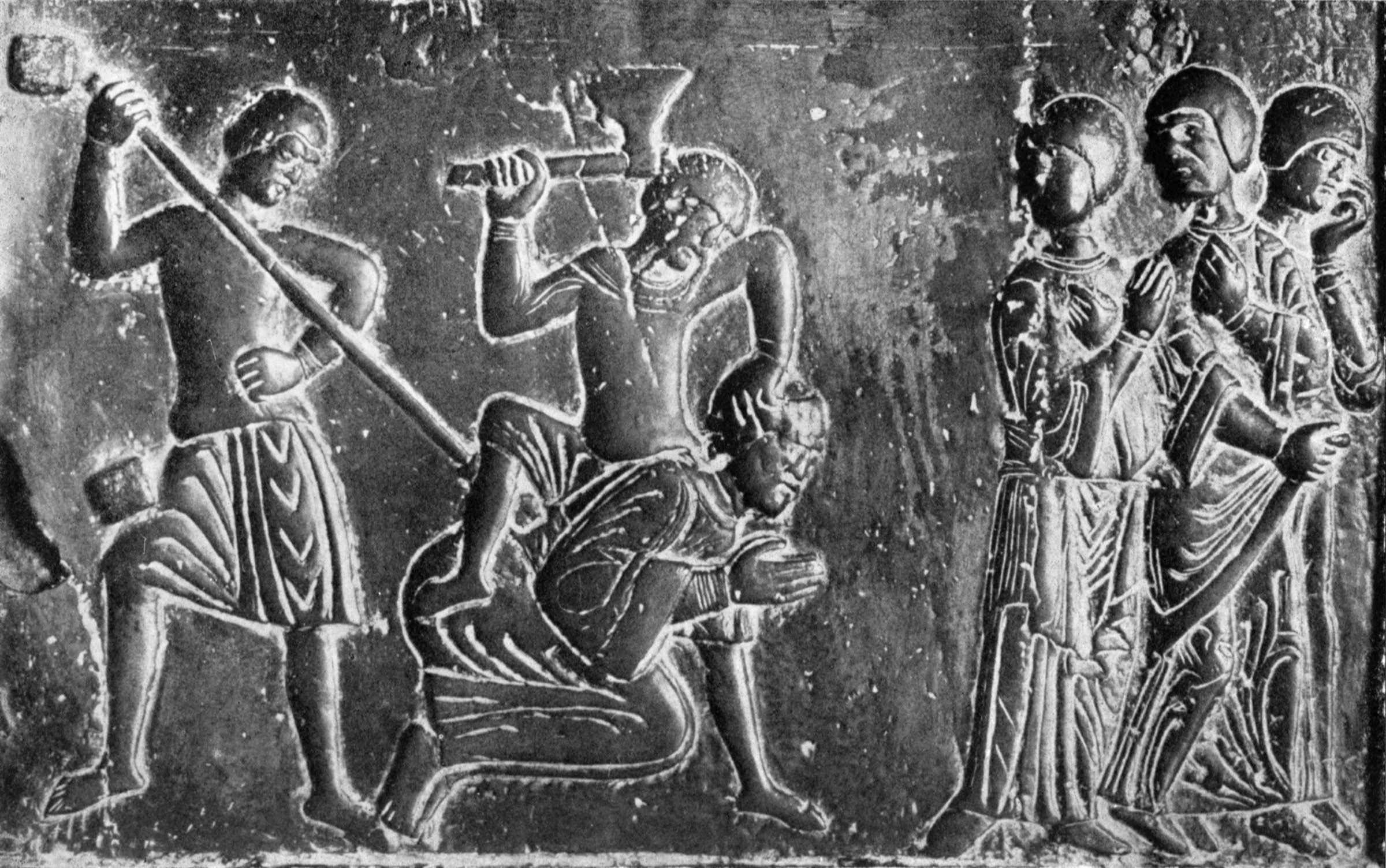
Saint Adalbert's martyrdom among the pagan Prussians depicted on the doors of the Gniezno Cathedral (Poland)

A member of the powerful Slavník dynasty, Adalbert, became the bishop of Prague around 983. Emperor Henry IV's diploma of 1086 (the text of which has been preserved by Cosmas of Prague) describes the boundaries of Bishop Adalbert's diocese. According to the diploma, Bishop Adalbert's jurisdiction included both Bohemia and Moravia, which suggests that the see of Moravia had meanwhile been dissolved. The diploma states that parts of Silesia, Lesser Poland (including Kraków), and modern Slovakia also belonged to the bishopric in the late 10th century.

Bishop Adalbert attempted to strengthen Christian values in his diocese, for instance by condemning polygamy. However, he failed in his efforts and departed his see for Italy in 988 or 989. He only returned to Prague upon the request of Boleslaus II in 992. In next year the duke and the bishop jointly established Břevnov Monastery for Benedictine monks. Bishop Adalbert again left for Rome just before the massacre of his kinsmen by the duke in 995. Adalbert himself suffered martyrdom among the pagan Prussians in 997. His canonization was initiated in 999 by Emperor Otto III.

[Adalbert] planned to set his flock free form the captivity of the demons and of the vices; they, however, never ceased to bind themselves all the more tightly in the bounds of every possible sin. Finally, the bishop saw that they were eager to go against the divine laws in every way they could. [...] In the end, he decided it was better form him to leave them rather than waste his efforts on such blind and self-destructive people. Those who had heard the account of these events from his own mouth say that there were three main reasons why things turned out this way. The first and rather the most important reason was polygamy; second, the detestable marriage of the clergy; third, the captives and slaves from among the Christians bought by a Jewish merchant with accursed gold and whom not even such an important bishop could ransom.

— The Life of Saint Adalbert Bishop of Prague and Martyr

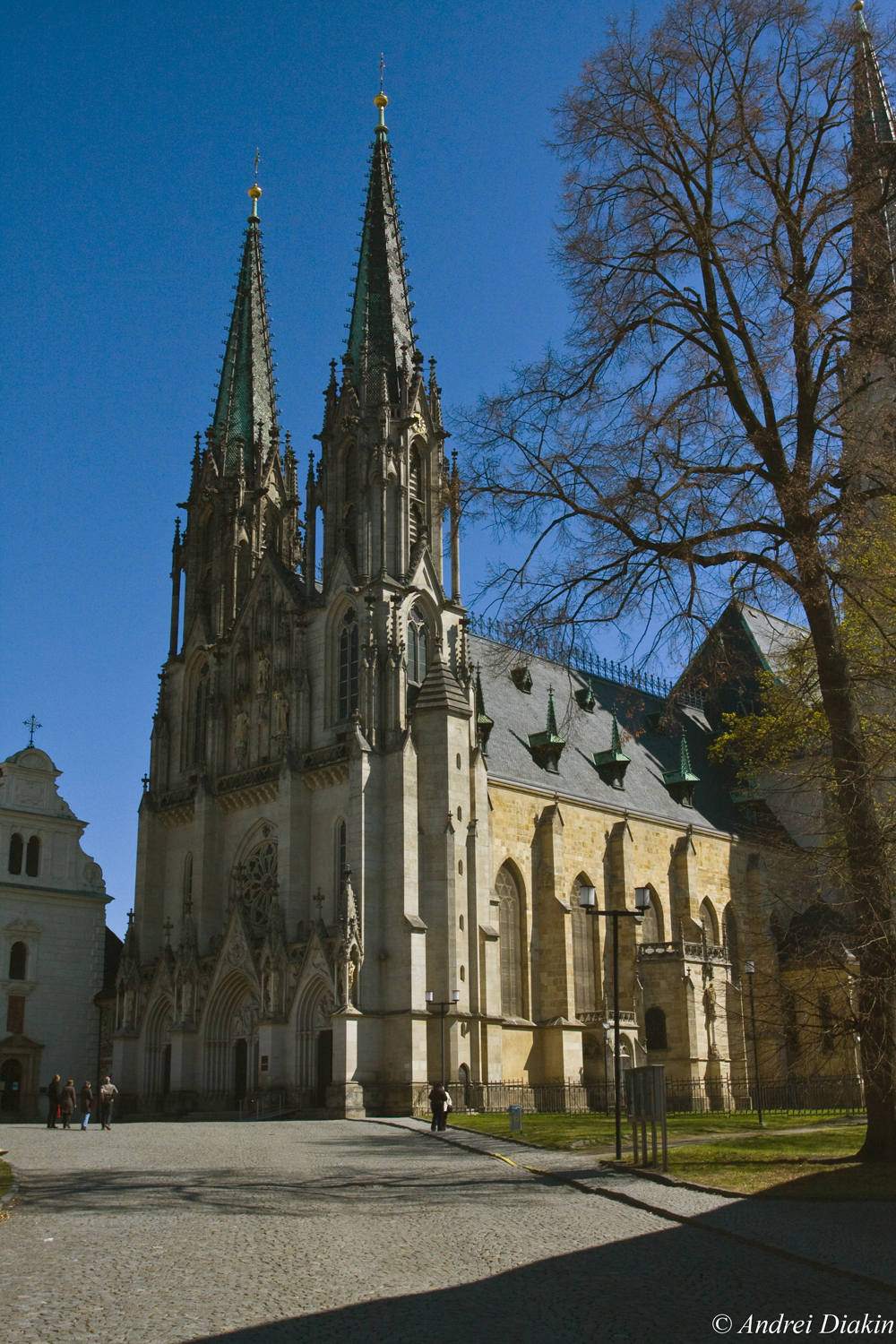
Saint Wenceslas Cathedral at Olomouc

Saint Adalbert's relics were initially buried in the Gniezno Cathedral in Poland, but they were translated by force to Prague under Duke Bretislaus I (r. 1035–1055). On this occasion, in 1039, the duke issued decrees which prescribed the general observance of Christian customs, including the prohibition of working on Sundays and on feast days and a ban on burials outside Christian graveyards. The separate diocese for Moravia, with its seat in Olomouc, was restored under Duke Vratislaus II (r. 1061–1092), although his brother Bishop Jaromír of Prague (r. 1068–1090) made every effort to hinder the dismemberment of his diocese. Likewise, the establishment of the wealthy Vyšehrad Chapter around 1070, which was directly subordinated to the Holy See, diminished the power of the bishops of Prague. On the other hand, a large basilica dedicated to St. Vitus was erected on the site of an earlier rotunda at Prague which served as the new see of the bishopric. A new cathedral was built at Olomouc under Bishop Jindřich Zdík (r. 1126–1150) who moved his see to the castle in the town.

Bretislaus I's decrees of 1039 make references to archpriests and archdeacons which points at the existence of large parishes with their seats in strongholds. The development of the local church system accelerated after a papal legate Cardinal Guido obliged the two Czech bishops to determine the boundaries of the parishes in their dioceses in 1143. The erection of new cathedrals contributed to the development of cathedral chapters which were organized in accordance with the ideas of contemporary canon law, including celibacy. However, marriage and concubinage remained widespread among the lower clergy up until the end of the 12th century. Cardinal Guido even wrote of clergymen "found bigamous or married to widows or repudiated women."

In the 11th and 12th centuries a number of new monasteries were founded in the Czech lands, most of them by the dukes. Sázava Monastery which was established around 1032 became a significant center of Slavic literature, but its German abbot had all Slavic books destroyed in 1097. Further Benedictine abbeys were established up until the middle of the 12th century when new religious orders arrived and became popular in the Czech lands. The Cistercians were first settled at Sedlec Abbey upon the initiative of a Czech nobleman named Miroslav in 1142 or 1143. The first Premonstratensian house was set up at Strahov in 1143 or 1144.

== See also ==
- History of the Czech lands
