= Halama =

Halama (Czech feminine: Halamová) is a Czech and Polish surname. In Czech, the word halama expressively means 'clumsy person', but it also referred to a young man or a peasant. As a surname, it was first documented in 1489. Notable people with the surname include:

- Grzegorz Halama (born 1970), Polish parodist and cabaret actor
- Jan Halama (born 1988), Czech footballer
- John Halama (born 1972), American baseball player
- Loda Halama (1911–1996), Polish dancer and actress
- Marco Halama (born 1997), Slovak ice hockey player
- Ota Halama (born 1974), Czech church historian
- Václav Halama (1940–2017), Czech football player and coach
