= Ota Halama =

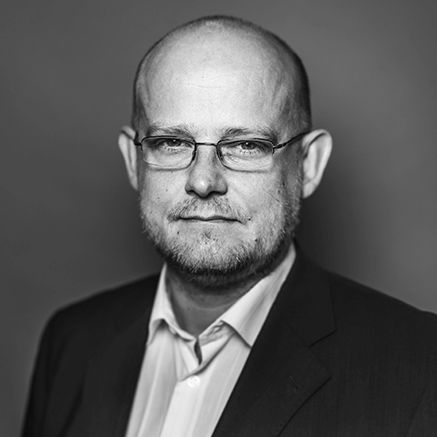
Ota Halama

Ota Halama (born 12 December 1974) is a Czech church historian and a professor at the Department of Church History at the Protestant Theological Faculty of Charles University in Prague. His main area of research is the history of Christianity in Bohemia during the Middle Ages and the early modern period, in particular the Bohemian Reformation of the 15th, 16th, and 17th centuries.

== Biography ==
Ota Halama was born in Chlumec nad Cidlinou, then part of Czechoslovakia, in 1974. He studied at Charles University from 1993–1998 and did his postgraduate studies from 1998–2001. His doctoral dissertation, The Question of Saints in the Bohemian Reformation (later published in book form in 2002), earned the Josef Hlávka Award at Charles University. He joined the Charles University faculty in 2002 as an assistant professor. He became a full professor in 2019.

He is a member of the Evangelical Church of Czech Brethren, the main Protestant church in the Czech Republic. He has also written on the Rastafari religion.

== Selected works ==
Some works written by Halama include:

- Halama, Ota (2002). Otázka svatých v české reformac [The Question of Saints in the Bohemian Reformation] (in Czech). ISBN 80-86263-25-8.
- Halama, Ota (2008). Rastafari. Pozadí vzniku hnutí, vznik a vývoj hnutí, styl života [Rastafari] (in Czech). Volvox Globator. ISBN 9788072076697.
- Halama, Ota (2015). Svatý Jan Hus. Stručný přehled projevů domácí úcty k českému mučedníku v letech 1415-1620 [Saint John Hus] (in Czech). ISBN 978-80-7017-230-8.

Halama has edited the monograph collection:

- Halama, Ota, ed. (2014). Amica—Sponsa—Mater: Bible v čase reformace [Amica—Sponsa—Mater: The Bible at the time of the Reformation]. ISBN 978-80-7017-213-1.
