= Gniezno Doors =

Bronze doors at Gniezno Cathedral in Poland

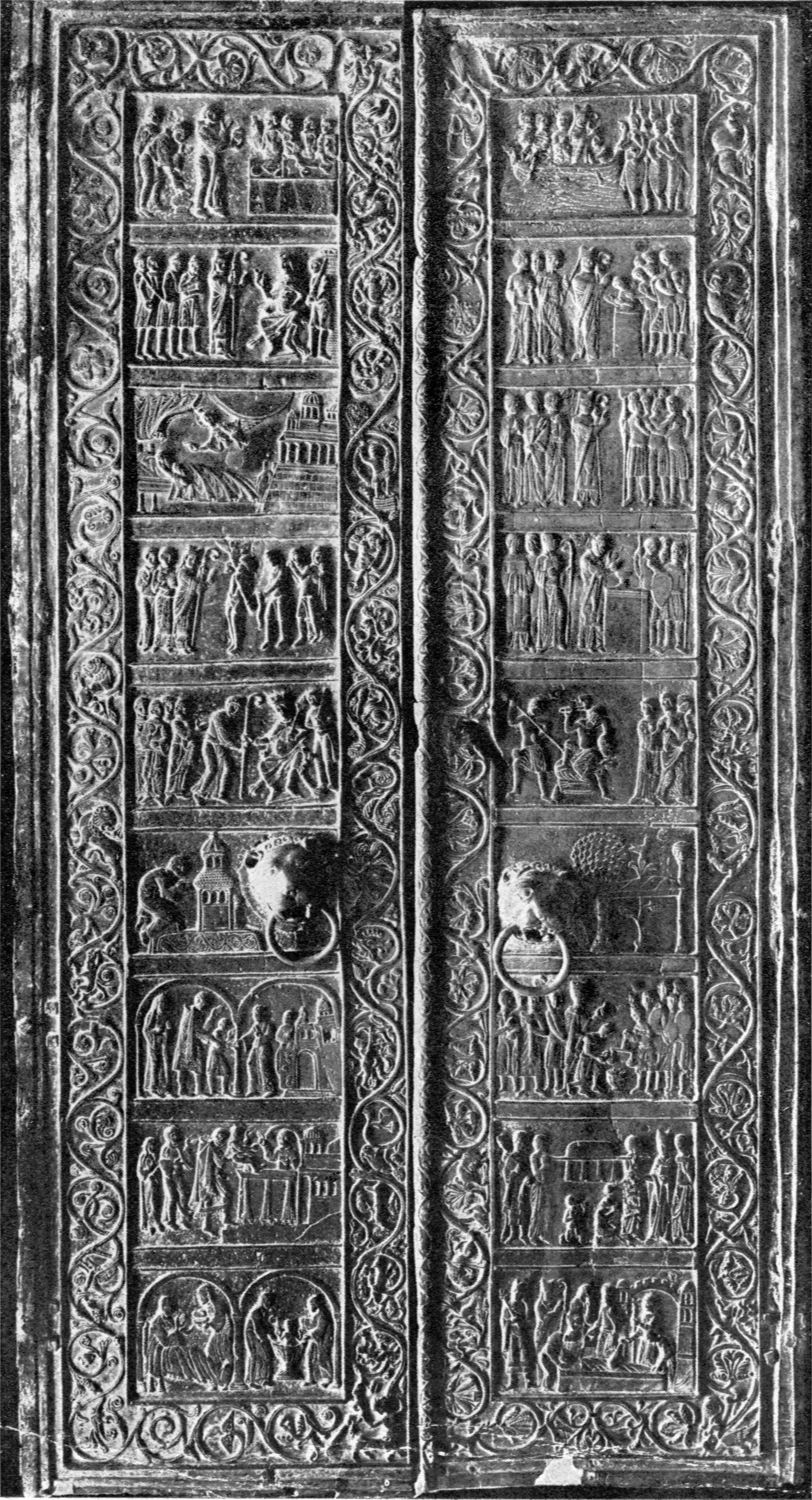
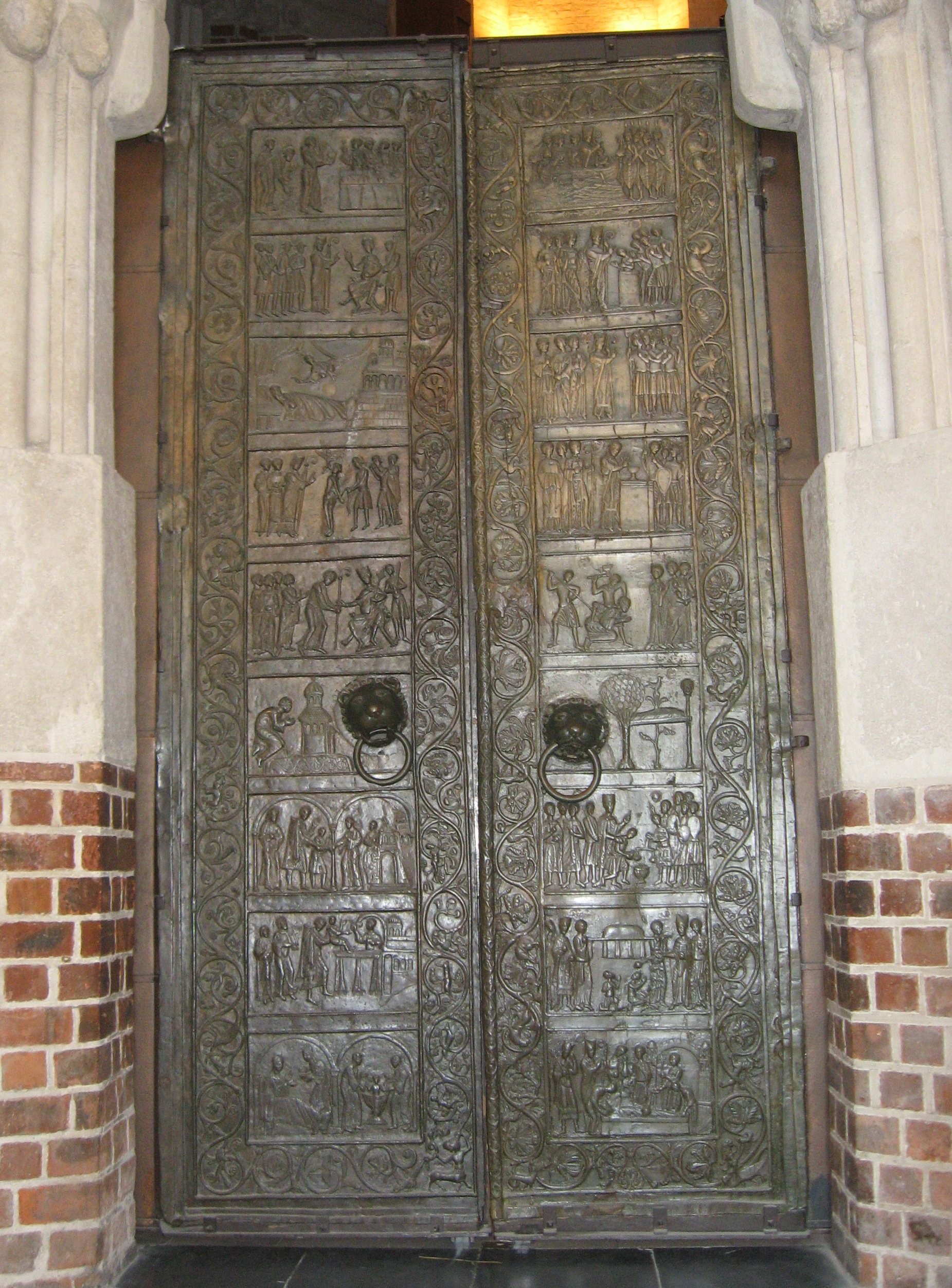
Gniezno Doors - eighteen scenes from the life of Saint Adalbert

The Gniezno Doors (Polish: Drzwi Gnieźnieńskie, Latin: Porta Regia) are a pair of bronze doors placed at the entrance to Gniezno Cathedral in Gniezno, Poland. They are decorated with eighteen bas-relief scenes from the life of St. Adalbert (in Polish, Święty Wojciech), whose remains had been purchased for their weight in gold and brought back to, and enshrined in, the cathedral. The cathedral is a Gothic building which the doors predate, having been carried over from an earlier temple. The doors were made around 1175, in the reign of Mieszko III the Old, and are one of the most important works of Romanesque art in Poland.

== Placing the origin of the doors ==
Locating the origin of the doors has been the subject of much discussion. It is clear that their style derives from the Mosan area in modern Belgium and France. Their place of manufacture has been argued to be Hildesheim (home of the famous Bernward Doors of about 1015), Bohemia, Flanders (perhaps Liege), or locally. Swartzenski says "design and wax model, Liege (?)" but "cast in Gniezno (?)", "soon after 1127", but this date now seems very much a minority view - it was the year when St Adalbert's head was "recovered", not having been with the initial batch of relics. Another possibility is that the artists and craftsmen were imported from further West for the commission, perhaps easier than transporting the single piece of the left door, either in wax or bronze form, across much of Europe.

At this time the Polish church had strong links with the Archdiocese of Cologne and the home area of Mosan art, which led Western European metalwork at this date. The question has not been settled by the discovery during restoration work in 1956 of partly effaced inscriptions reading "me fecit me...us", "petrus" and "bovo luitinius/latinus", probably giving the name of the craftsman in charge of the casting. These mean "made by" ... "Peter" ..." of ? [place]", with the "luitinius" location probably referring either one the four Lutins in modern Poland (not all possible candidates at this date), or Lille in northern France not far from the Mosan region, or Lucino near Como in northern Italy. If the reading is "latinus", or "Peter the Latin made me", the meaning is even less clear, but this is regarded as the less likely reading. Neither name is known in any other contexts.

== Description ==
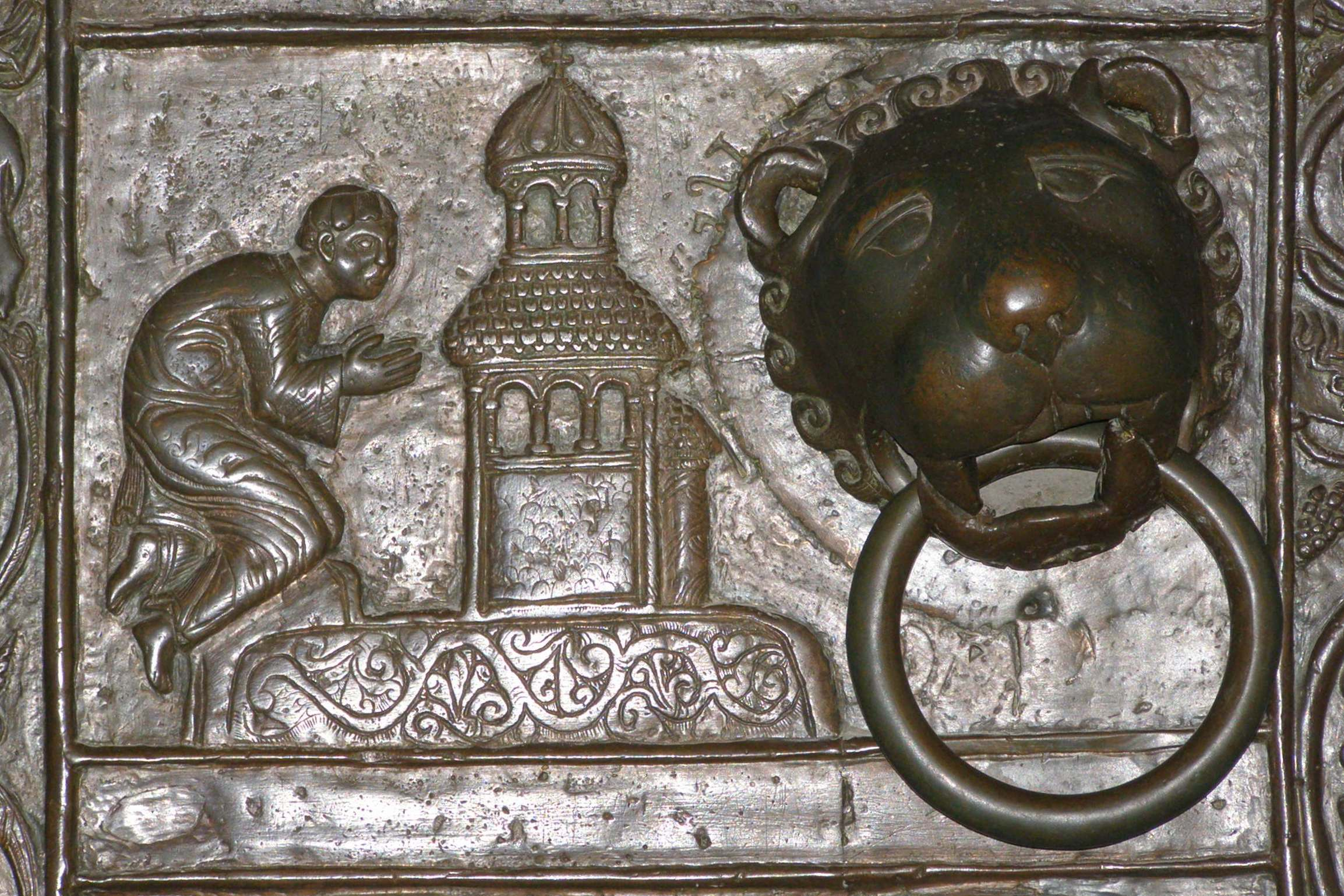
Scene no. 4 from the left door - Adalbert prays before a shrine

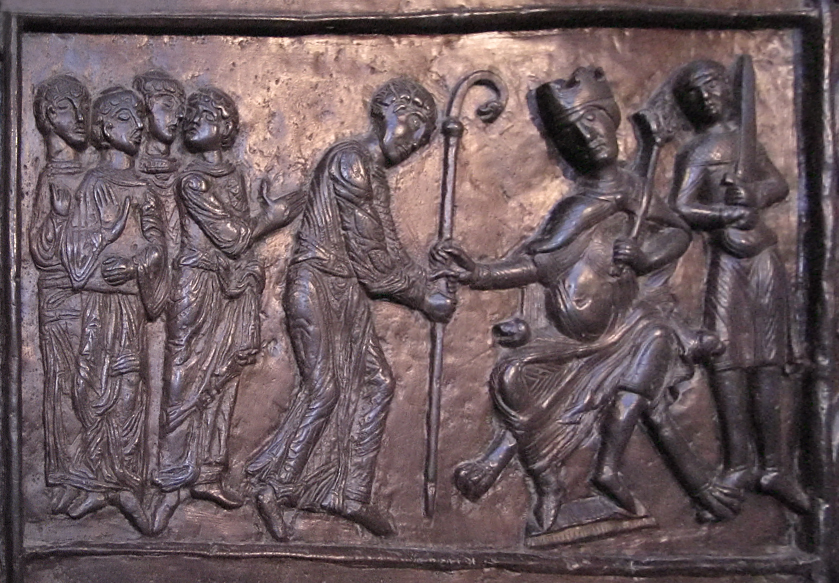
Scene no. 5. from the left wing - Adalbert becomes bishop

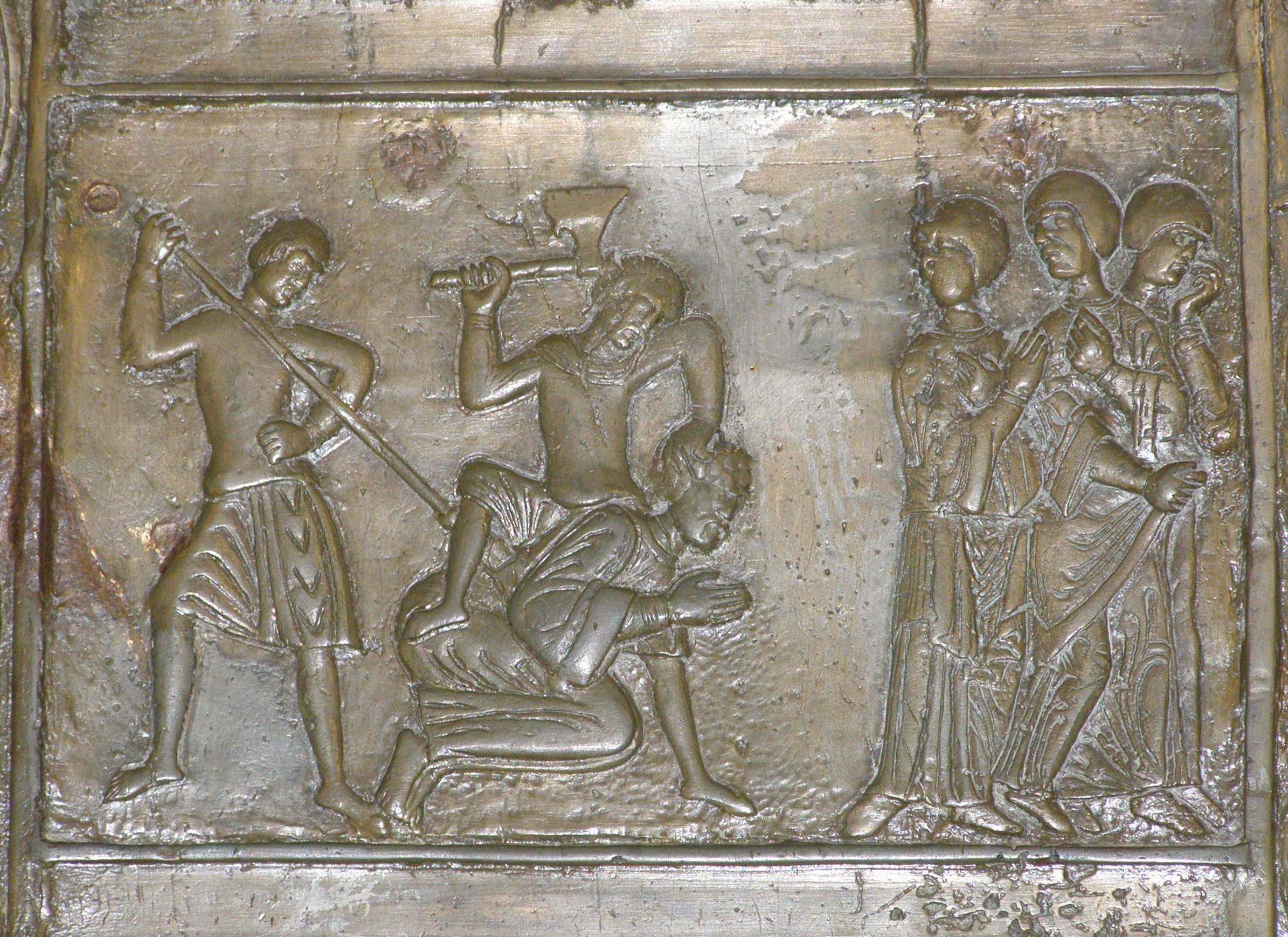
Scene no. 14. from the right wing - the martyrdom of Adalbert

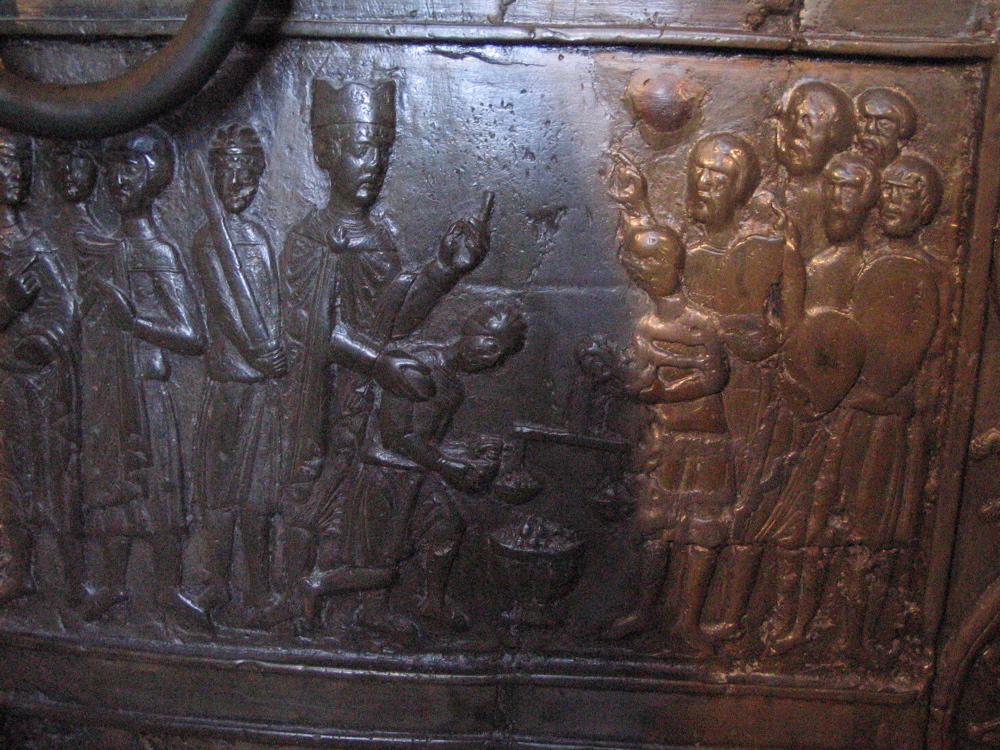
Scene no. 16 from the right wing - Bolesław buys Adalbert's body back from the Prussians

The left door (facing the reliefs from outside the cathedral) is 328 cm high and 84 cm wide, the right 323 cm high and 83 cm wide. Both are between 1.5 and 2.5 cm thick. They were cast in bronze using the lost wax casting technique in a mixture of copper, tin with a small amount of lead, with some fine detail being added after casting by engraving tools. The left leaf was cast in one piece, but the right was made in 24 cast sections which were then soldered together. Both the lion-headed knockers, which do not align correctly, were also cast separately and soldered.

The doors of Hildesheim Cathedral, of about 1015, had pioneered the casting of a large door mostly covered with reliefs in a single piece, which was considerably more difficult than the usual technique of earlier Italian bronze doors, which used bronze relief casts fixed to a wooden core. Plain doors with no figurative decoration had already been cast whole in Germany - for example for Charlemagne's early 9th century Palatine Chapel at Aachen, following Roman techniques preserved by the Byzantines.

The Gniezo left door follows the Hildesheim method. The relief is also typically much higher on the left door, as much as 75% on some figures, where few on the right door reach 25%. Around the panels runs a decorative frieze of Mosan-style "rinceaux", or scrolling foliage, with small figures of astrological personifications and other subjects at intervals. Among the figures is "a lion stretched against a rope", which features on the reverse side of the 20 złoty banknote.

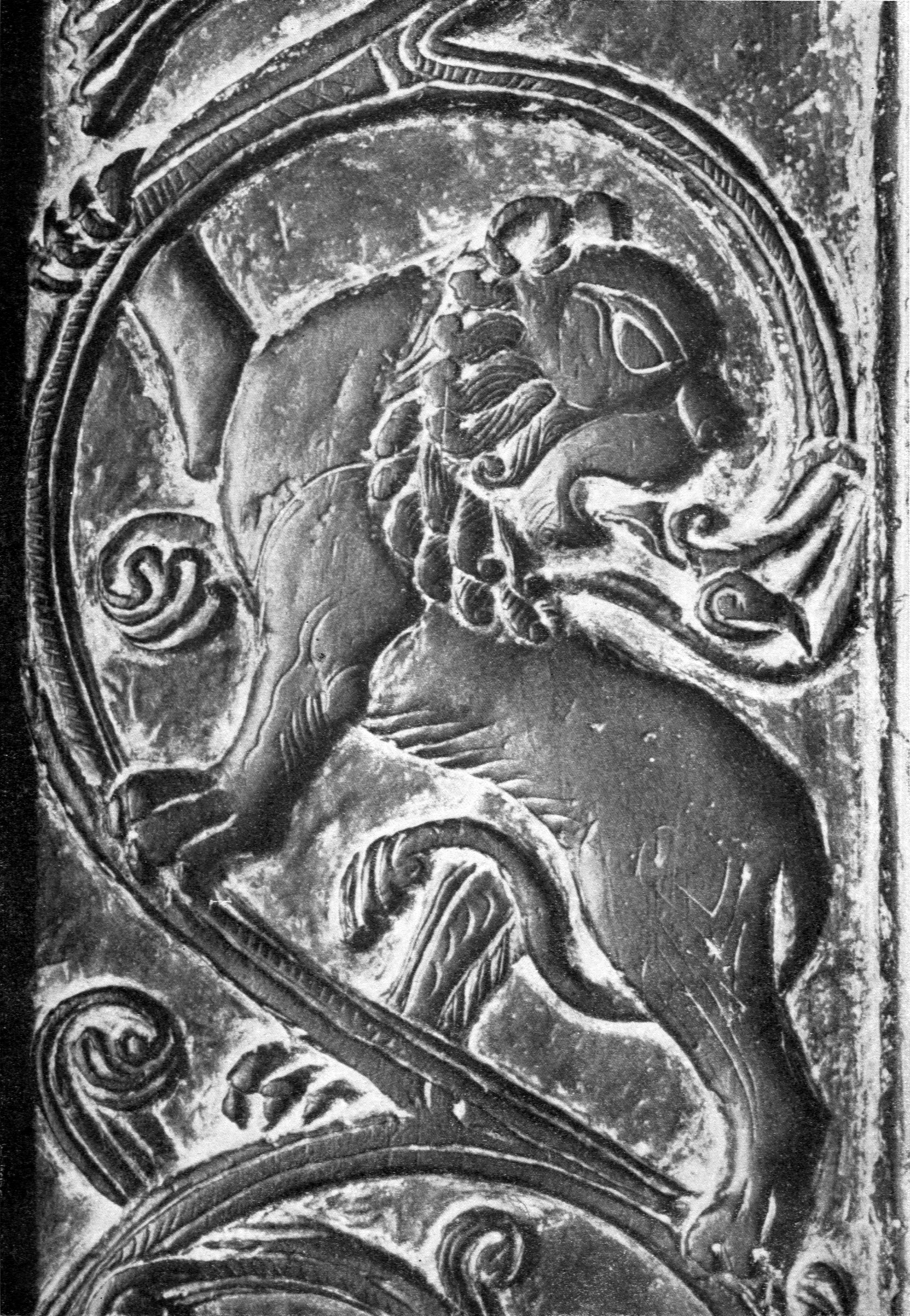
“ lion stretched against a rope” featured on the 20 Złoty banknote

Adalbert had been martyred trying to convert the pagan Prussians, who are shown in some scenes, giving a rare near-contemporary record of their appearance; the Prussians remained largely pagan at the time the doors were made. To illustrate the life of a single saint on such a monumental scale was most unusual at this period, and the doors are the only Romanesque ones in Europe with such a programme. The designs perhaps followed a now lost cycle in an illuminated manuscript of the life of the saint, though even in this sort of works such an extended pictorial treatment of a saint's life was unusual. Two lives of Adalbert have survived, written around 1000, soon after his death, but no illuminated copies that throw light on the visual sources for the doors, though their texts help explain the scenes.

Whatever the origin of the designs, the compositions show the borrowings from more common subject compositions to which early medieval artists usually resorted when confronted with a novel subject. Devising new compositions was not part of their training. Some scenes adapt subjects from the life of Christ and other models. The left door shows his early life and life in Christian territory. The right door shows his missionary activities, apparently ignoring those outside modern Poland. Their iconography "clearly shows they were made as a political statement".

== Subjects of the panels ==
The sequence starts from the bottom of the left door, going upwards, then to the right door going down. Adalbert ("he") is the centre of all scenes.

1) His birth and baptism, in two scenes
2) As a sick child he is saved by being placed on an altar dedicated to the Virgin Mary
3) His parents place him in the monastery at Magdeburg at his request
4) He prays before a shrine (with knocker)
5) Emperor Otto II gives him his bishop's crozier, which happened at Verona
6) He expels a demon from a possessed man
7) He has a vision of Christ telling him to save Christians from slavery by the Jewish traders
8) He pleads with the Duke of Bohemia for the release of Christians slaves by their Jewish masters
9) The accident of the wine pitcher - when he dropped one it did not break
10) He lands in Gdańsk by ship (top of right door)
11) He makes conversions there
12) He preaches
13) He says Mass on the morning of his death, with hostile Prussians on the right
14) He is martyred by two men, while his companions watch
15) His body is exposed in the open, with his severed head on a stake; an eagle guards it (with knocker)
16) His remains are bought by the Polish ruler from the Prussians, for their weight in gold
17) His remains are taken back to Gniezno
18) His remains are buried in Gniezno Cathedral (bottom of right door)

== See also ==
- Florence Baptistery doors
