= Dobřichov =

- Municipality
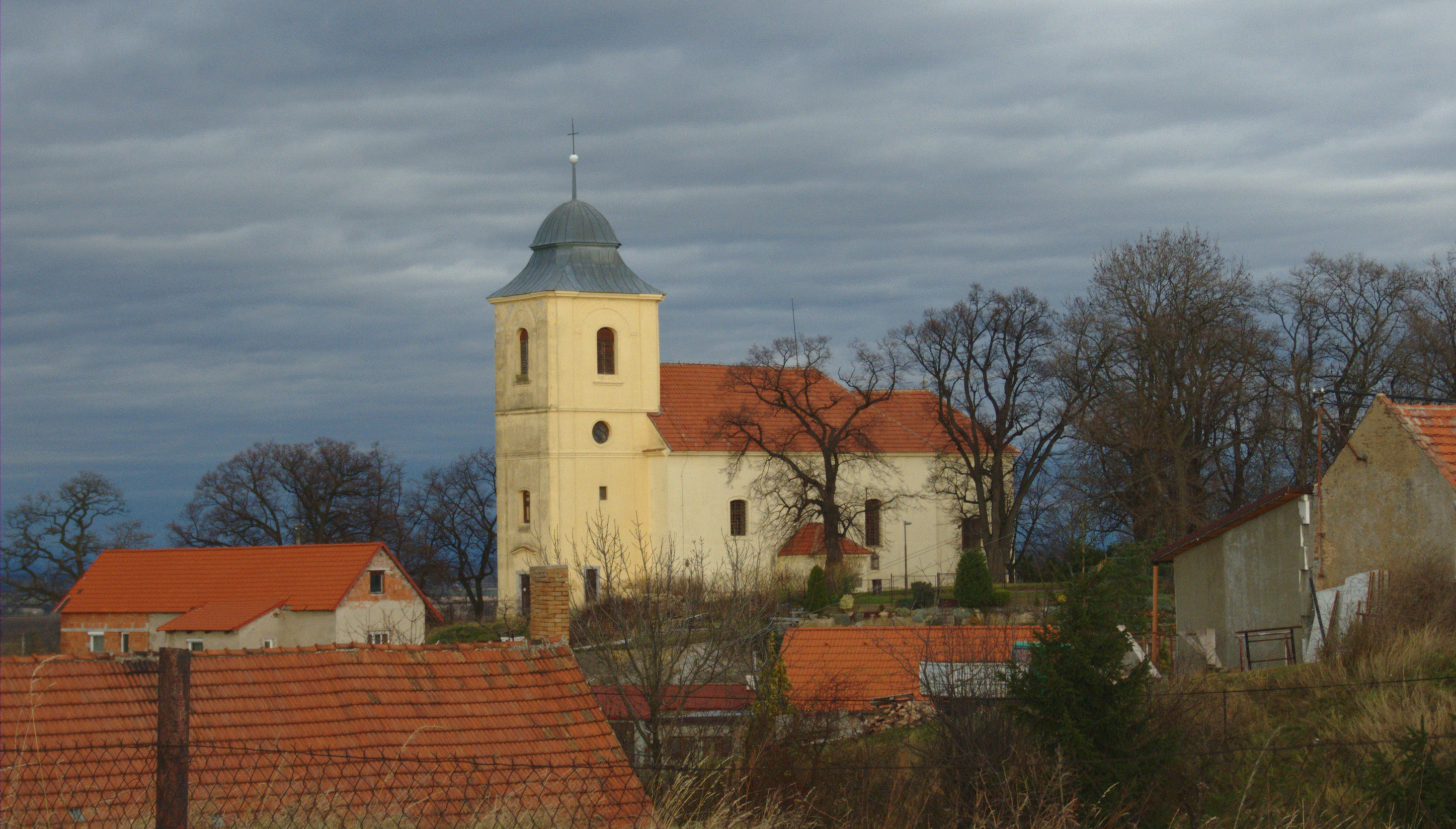
- Church of the Holy Trinity

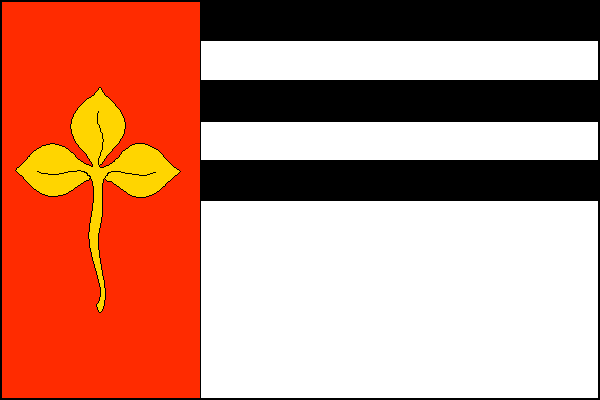
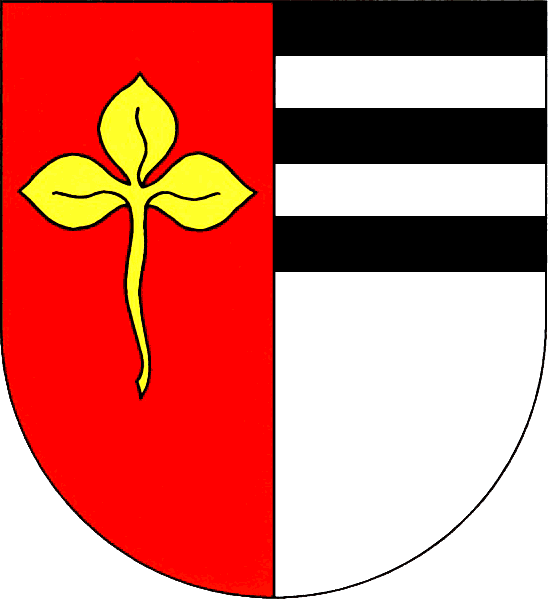
- Flag Coat of arms

- Location in the Czech Republic
- Coordinates: 50°4′47″N 15°1′57″E
- Country: Czech Republic
- Region: Central Bohemian
- District: Kolín
- First mentioned: 1345

Area
  - Total: 6.20 km^{2} (2.39 sq mi)
- Elevation: 194 m (636 ft)

Population (2026-01-01)
  - Total: 788
  - Density: 127/km^{2} (329/sq mi)
- Time zone: UTC+1 (CET)
  - Summer (DST): UTC+2 (CEST)
- Postal code: 289 11
- Website: dobrichov.cz

Dobřichov is a municipality and village in Kolín District in the Central Bohemian Region of the Czech Republic. It has about 800 inhabitants.

== Demographics ==
Historical population
Year	Pop.	±%
1869	523	—
1880	600	+14.7%
1890	714	+19.0%
1900	779	+9.1%
1910	896	+15.0%
1921	948	+5.8%
1930	1,032	+8.9%
1950	836	−19.0%
1961	895	+7.1%
1970	825	−7.8%
1980	730	−11.5%
1991	688	−5.8%
2001	763	+10.9%
2011	763	+0.0%
2021	783	+2.6%
Source: Censuses
