= Lutynia =

Lutynia may refer to:

== Czech Republic ==
- Dolní Lutyně, a village in Karviná District
- Lutyně (Orlová), a part of the town of Orlová in Karviná District

== Poland ==
- Lutynia, Kłodzko County in Lower Silesian Voivodeship (south-west Poland)
- Lutynia, Gmina Miękinia in Środa County, Lower Silesian Voivodeship (south-west Poland)
- Lutynia, Pleszew County in Greater Poland Voivodeship (west-central Poland)
- Lutynia, Gmina Nowe Miasto nad Wartą, Środa County in Greater Poland Voivodeship (west-central Poland)
