= Gniezno Cathedral =

Brick Gothic cathedral in Gniezno, Poland

Primatial Basilica Metropolitan Cathedral of Gniezno
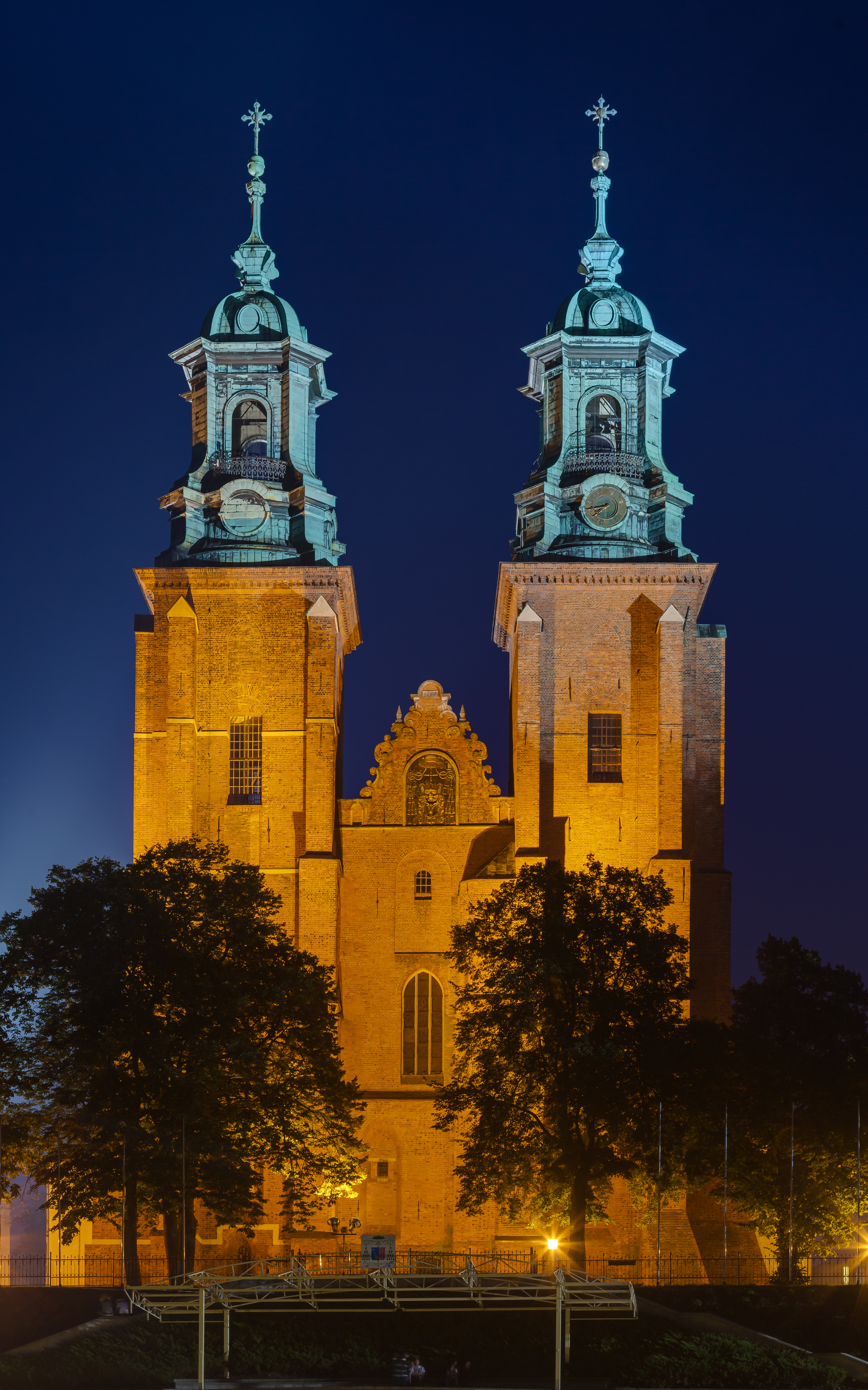
- Primatial Basilica; Metropolitan Cathedral of Gniezno
- 52°32′14″N 17°35′49″E
- Location: Gniezno
- Country: Poland
- Denomination: Roman Catholic

Architecture
- Style: Gothic
- Completed: c. 11th century

Specifications
- Length: 85 metres
- Width: 22 metres
- Height: 64 metres
- Materials: Brick

Administration
- District: Old Town
- Province: Archdiocese of Gniezno

Historic Monument of Poland
- Designated: 1994-09-08
- Reference no.: M.P. z 1994 r. Nr 50, poz. 416

The Royal Gniezno Cathedral (The Primatial Cathedral Basilica of the Assumption of the Blessed Virgin Mary and Shrine of St. Adalbert, Polish: Bazylika Archikatedralna Wniebowzięcia Najświętszej Marii Panny i Sanktuarium św. Wojciecha) is a Brick Gothic cathedral located in the historic city of Gniezno that served as the coronation place for several Polish monarchs and as the seat of Polish church officials continuously for nearly 1000 years. Throughout its long and tragic history, the building stayed mostly intact, making it one of the oldest and most precious sacred monuments in Poland.

The cathedral is known for its twelfth-century (ca. 1175), two-winged bronze doors decorated with scenes of martyrdom of St. Adalbert of Prague and a silver relic coffin of that saint. The coffin was made by Peter von der Rennen of pure silver in 1662 after the previous one, established in 1623 by King Sigismund III Vasa himself, was robbed by the Swedes in 1655, during the Swedish invasion.

The temple is one of Poland's national Historical Monuments (Pomnik historii), as designated on 16 September 1994, and tracked by the National Heritage Board of Poland.

== History ==
=== Early history ===
The religious temple dates back to the end of the ninth century, when an oratory was built in the shape of a rectangular nave. At the end of the tenth century Duke Mieszko I of Poland built a new temple on a cruciform plan and remodeled the existing nave oratory. In the year 977 Duchess Dąbrówka, the wife of Mieszko I, was buried here. Before the arrival of St. Adalbert of Prague in Gniezno, Prince Bolesław I the Brave, later the first king of Poland, rebuilt the temple according to the plan of a rectangle, elevating it later to the rank of a cathedral. In the year 999 the funeral of St. Adalbert took place and later also his canonization by Pope Sylvester II.

In March 1000 Emperor Otto III came to Gniezno to pray at the tomb of now blessed St. Adalbert. He then called the Congress of Gniezno, where Polish Prince Bolesław I the Brave and the Emperor discussed plans to create a joint kingdom of Germany, France, Rome, England and Slavic States. He initiated the creation of the Archdiocese of Gniezno and the first metropolis church in Poland, subordinate only to the pope. The first appointed archbishop was Radzim Gaudenty. In 1018 a fire started in the temple and it took in seven years to repair the structure.

In the year 1025 Bolesław the Brave was crowned as the first King of Poland in the Gniezno Cathedral. After his death Mieszko II Lambert succeeded to the throne. In 1038 Czech prince Bretislav I surrounded and conducted a siege of the city, destroying and robbing the borough and the precious treasures inside the cathedral. After a few years the temple was rebuilt in the Romanesque style and consecrated in 1064. Twelve years later King Bolesław II the Bold was crowned in Gniezno. At the end of the eleventh century the eastern part of the temple suddenly collapsed.

=== Late Middle Ages ===
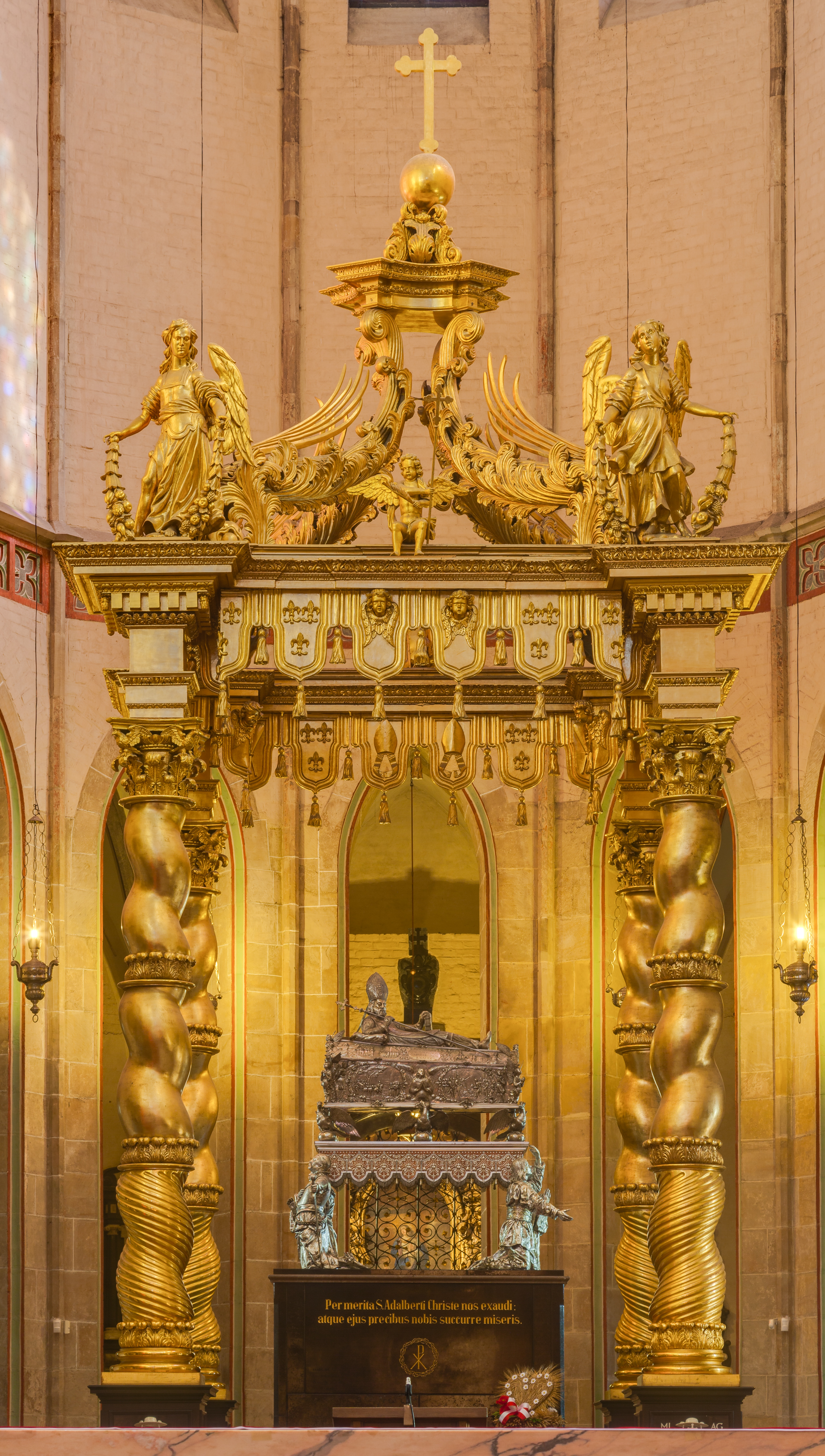
The silver coffin of St. Adalbert, made by Peter von der Rennen in 1662

In the years 1103–1104 a synod was held with the participation of the papal legate associated with the retrieval and placing of the precious relics of St. Adalbert in the cathedral. A few years later, Duke Bolesław III Wrymouth donated a substantial sum of money for the preservation of his tomb as well as the structure. In the year 1127 celebrations were held in the cathedral commemorating St. Adalbert. In 1175 the famous bronze Gniezno Doors were placed in the cathedral and two years later, the Duke of Greater Poland, Mieszko III the Old, visited the site.

After 219 years, in 1295, the penultimate royal coronation of Prince Przemysł II took place at the Cathedral of Gniezno. Five years later, Czech prince Wenceslaus II of Bohemia forcibly entered the town and was crowned king. It was the last royal coronation held in Gniezno. In 1331, the Teutonic Knights pillaged and destroyed the temple. Ten years later, on the same site of the former cathedral, a Gothic temple was built under the personal supervision of Archbishop Jarosław Bogoria Skotnicki. The same Archbishop welcomed King Casimir III the Great, who donated a substantial sum of money and greatly contributed to the reconstruction of Gniezno. At the end of the fourteenth century the construction of the chancel and large nave was completed. In 1419 the archbishops of Gniezno were given the title of primate and represented the country in Rome as cardinals. The first appointed primate of Poland and cardinal was Mikołaj Trąba.

In 1613 a fire destroyed the spires, roof and two frontal towers of the temple. Seven years later, Adam of Wągrowiec came to the cathedral to try out the newly installed pipe organs. In the years 1641–1652 Primate Maciej Łubieński conducted a reconstruction project of the interior in the baroque style. In 1760, another fire broke out which resulted in the collapse of both towers, the star vault as well as the chancel. In the next few years the interior was completely rebuilt in classical architectural style with small elements of the now diminishing baroque style. The reconstruction was initiated by Primate Władysław Aleksander Łubieński.

=== Modern period ===
In 1809, the French army installed a military warehouse in the cathedral which was removed when Napoleon's troops left the area. In July 1923, thieves stole valuable relics from the cathedral and prompted a major police response. In 1931, Pope Pius XI bestowed the title of minor basilica on the cathedral. In 1939, following the invasion of Poland, the Nazis converted the temple into a concert hall. In 1945, another fire broke out which was caused by the intentional incendiary artillery shelling by the Red Army. This partially ruined the Gothic vault and consequently also the pipe organs and other historical architectural details. The city was retaken by the Soviets without any resistance offered by the Germans. At the turn of the 1950s and 1960s, the temple was fully restored in the Gothic style and all baroque architectural elements were subsequently removed from the nave and the temple itself, giving it a more medieval look to specifically resemble the original structure present during the coronation of Polish monarchs eight hundred years earlier.

On 3 June 1979 Pope John Paul II visited the cathedral.

== Architecture ==
=== Chapels ===
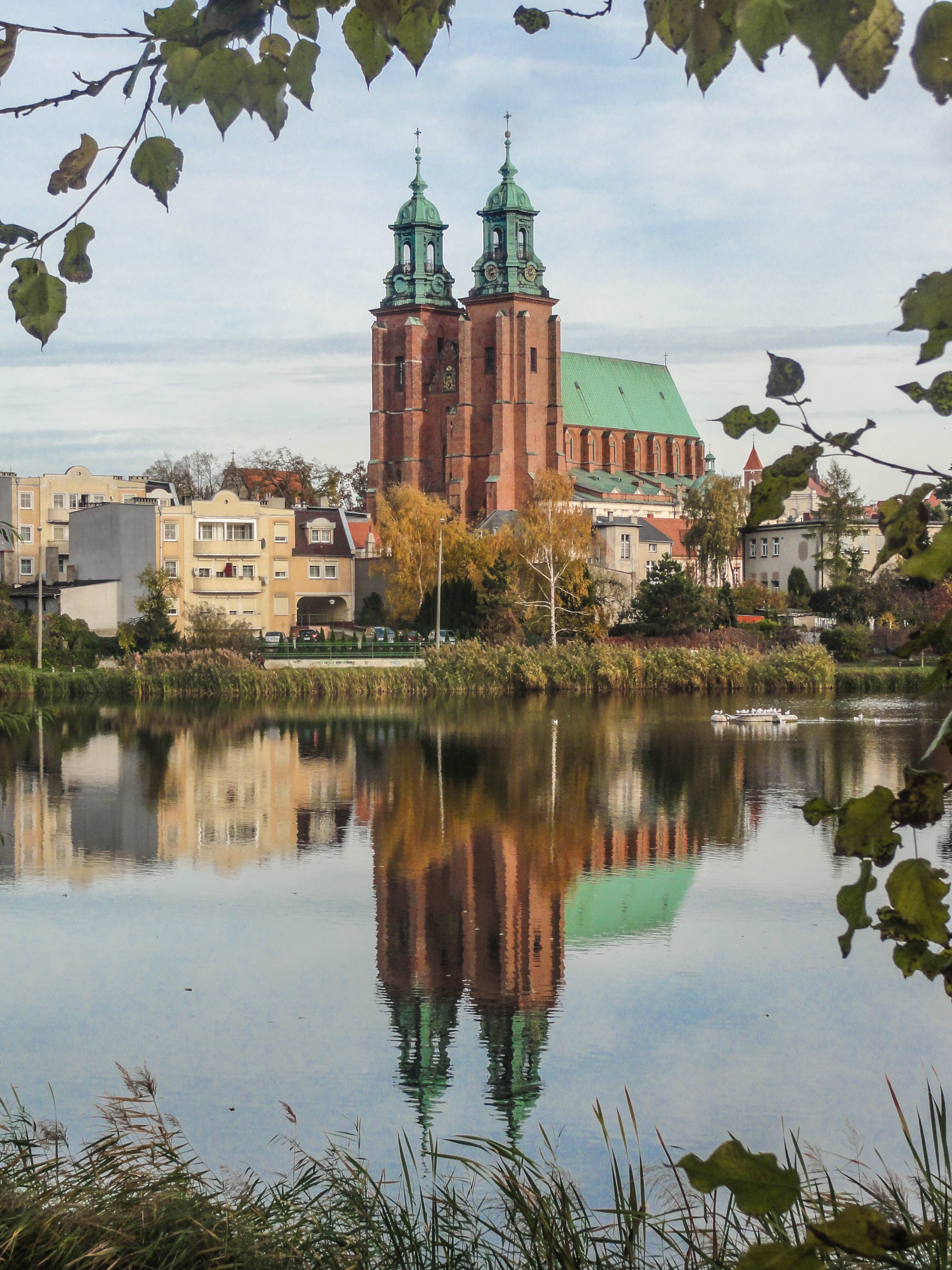
General view

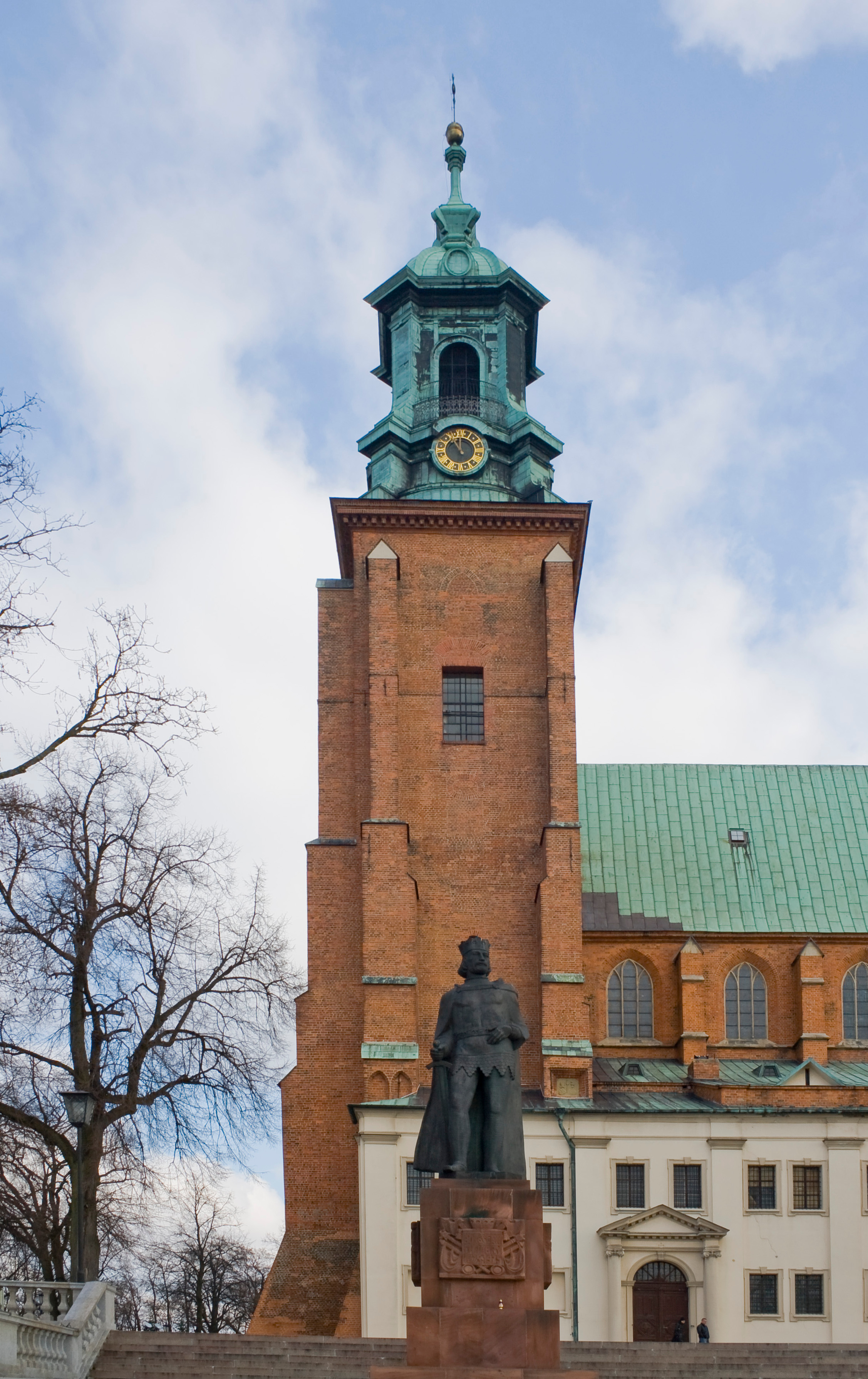
One of two frontal towers and a statue of Boleslaus I of Poland

The elliptical cupola covering the late-baroque Potocki Chapel, designed by Pompeo Ferrari and built 1727–1730, is the most beautiful in the cathedral. The parietal tomb of Archbishop Teodor Potocki (d. 1738), who pronounced Stanisław I Leszczyński king upon the death of Augustus II the Strong, and the epitaph of Ignacy Krasicki, poet and Archbishop of Gniezno (d. 1801).

The 14th-century Kołudzki Chapel was renovated in 1647 with consistent interior furnishings. The four corners of the world are personified on the mid-18th-century polychrome vault. The early-baroque portal with its 17th-century renaissance grille from Gdańsk is one of Poland's greatest blacksmithing achievements. The foundation plaque of the chapel has Szymon Kołudzki's (d. 1656), portrait, epitaph and tombstone.

St. Nicholas Chapel, also known as Dzierzgowski Chapel, dates from the 14th century. The Gothic arcade has the remains of 14th-century Gothic sculptural ornamentation featuring hunting scenes engraved in artificial stone and a mid-16th century renaissance polychrome. The chapel is embellished with two precious renaissance tombstones: the first was sculpted from red marble by Bartolommeo Berecci and features the reclining figure of Abp. Andrzej Krzycki (d. 1573), humanist and politician; the second was for Abp. Mikołaj Dzierzgowski (d. 1559), a supporter of Queen Bona Sforza, and was sculpted from sandstone and red marble by Hieronim Canavesi. There is also a round tondo with the Madonna of Giovanni Maria Padovano in the copestone.

The Łubieński Chapel was created in 1642–1648 by joining two medieval chapels and restructured along early-classicist lines in 1778. The early-baroque portals from c. 1640 are made of marble and closed with renaissance grilles from Gdańsk. The early-baroque tomb of Archbishop Maciej Łubieński (d. 1652) is made of marble and alabaster. The altar painting from 1646 has portraits of Łubieński family members.

=== Interior ===
The cathedral is a three-nave basilica-looking structure with polygonal presbytery and ambulatory and many adjacent chapels of noble and aristocratic families, some personally funded by the head of the family or the monarch of Poland. Under the tiled floor several discoveries were made; these included the relics of earlier pre-Romanesque buildings and several tombs of former archbishops. In the crypt of the cathedral there is a 1006-year-old sepulchral stone inscription on display, the oldest of its kind in the country, discovered by archeologists. Other aspects of the crypt may include the remaining fragments of the walls of the first temple funded by Mieszko I of Poland.

==== The presbytery and nave ====
In the center of presbytery of the cathedral stands the golden baldachin (based on the Bernini Altar) and beneath it the silver gilded baroque reliquary – the coffin of St. Adalbert with a wooden, probably cedar, box dating from the twelfth century covered with reliefs with the remains of the saint inside. Behind the shrine stands a red marble medieval tombstone dating from 1480 commemorating the patron. On the north side of the chancel (presbytery) there is a gold-plated stool with the emblem of Primate Stefan Wyszyński and above the throne hangs the coat of arms of the present Archbishop of Gniezno. In addition, at the end of the presbytery there is a large sacrificial altar with a relief of St. Adalbert. Above the altar is a rainbow beam with a precious Gothic crucifix from linden tree dating from around 1430. The rest of the nave consists of chairs for the faithful and a small room for church officials.

== Royal coronations in the cathedral ==
- 18 April 1025 – Bolesław I the Brave
- 25 December 1025 – Mieszko II Lambert and his wife Richensa of Lotharingia
- 25 December 1076 – Bolesław II the Bold and his wife Wyszesława of Kiev
- 26 June 1295 – Przemysł II and his wife Margaret of Brandenburgia
- August 1300 – Wenceslaus II of Bohemia

== See also ==
- Gniezno Doors
- Congress of Gniezno
- Polish Crown Jewels
- Szczerbiec
- Royal coronations in Poland
- Wawel Cathedral
- St. John's Cathedral
- 17th-century Western domes

== Gallery ==
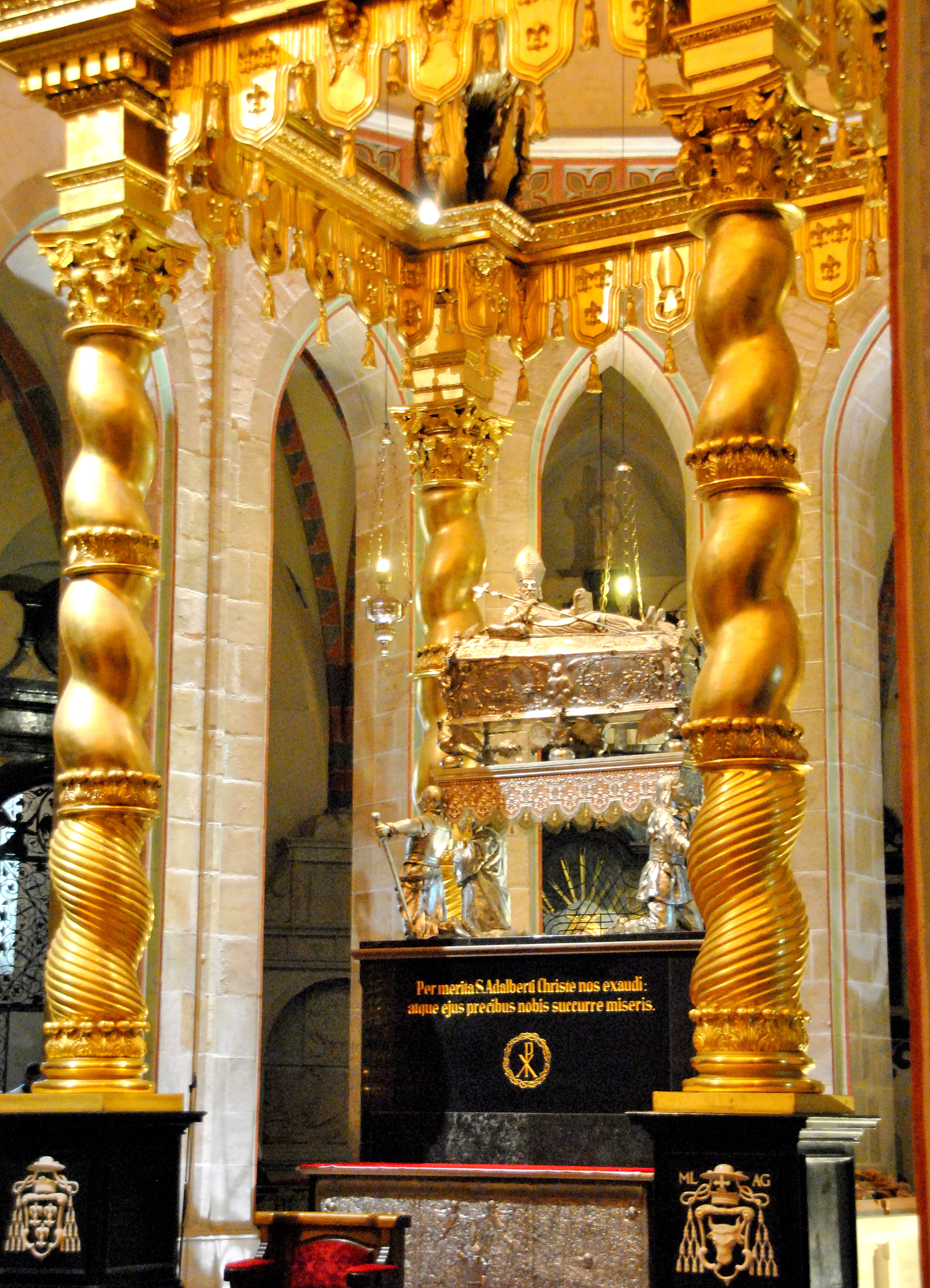
Coffin of Adalbert of Prague

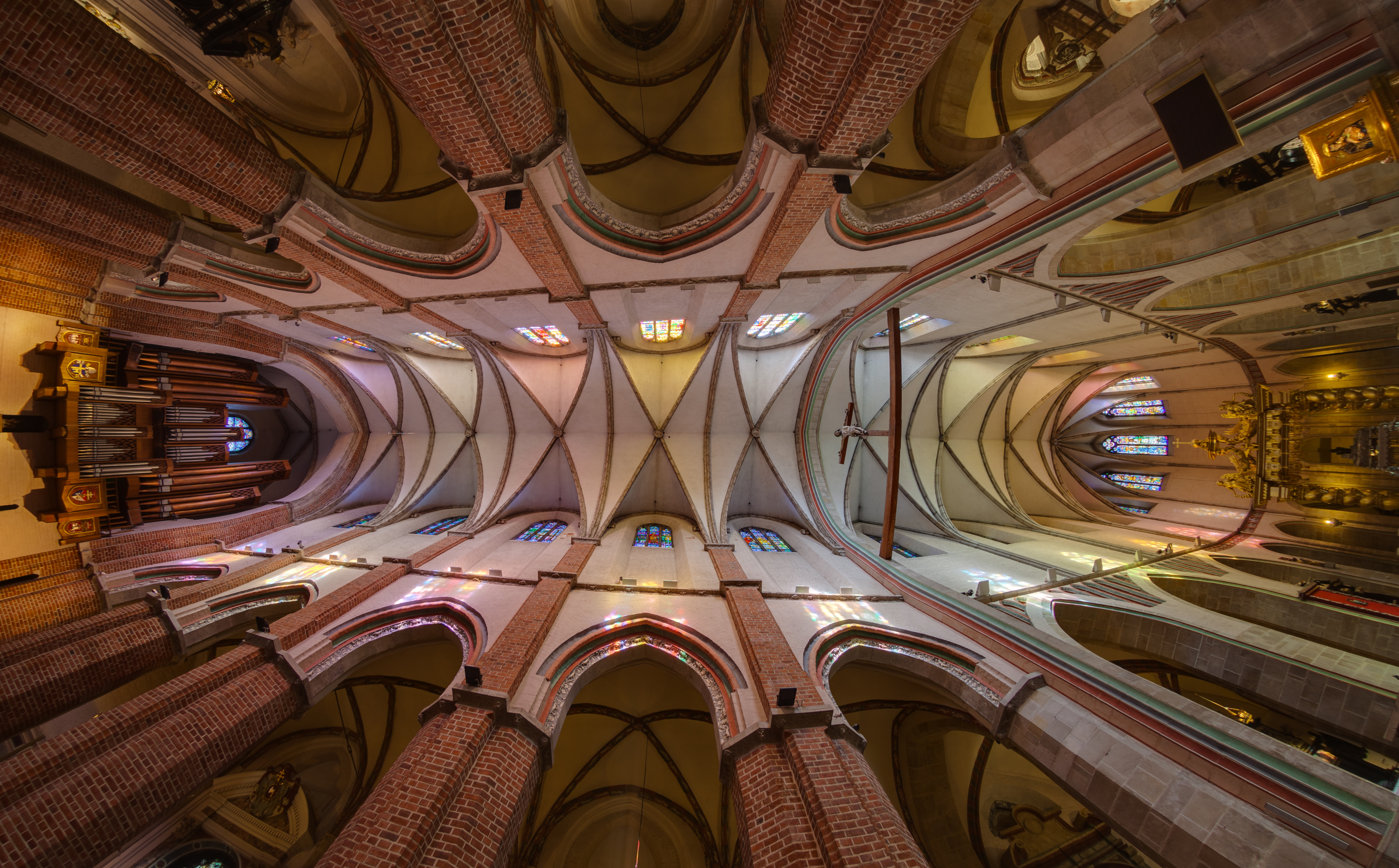
Fresco in the dome of a side chapel

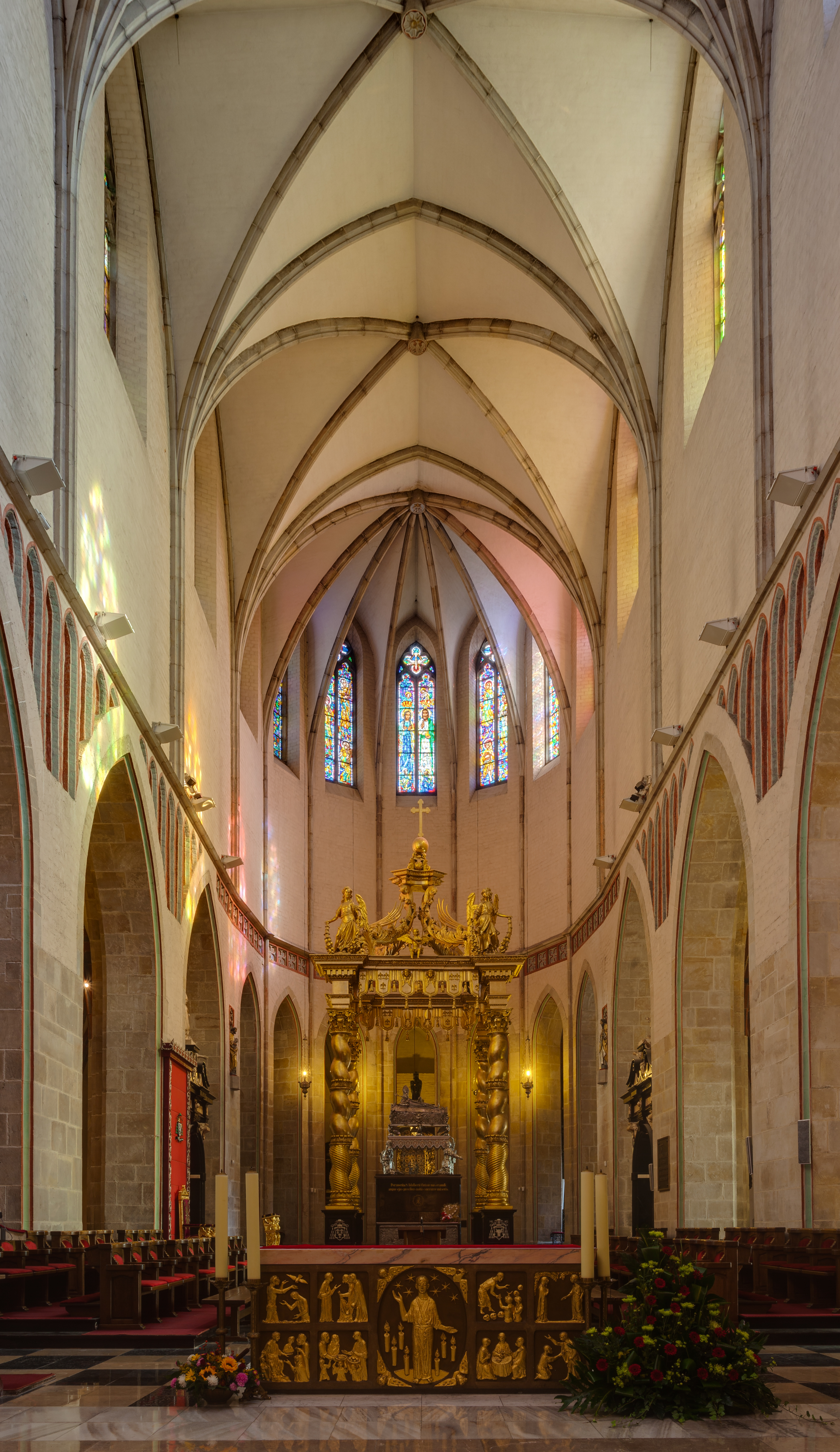
View of the interior

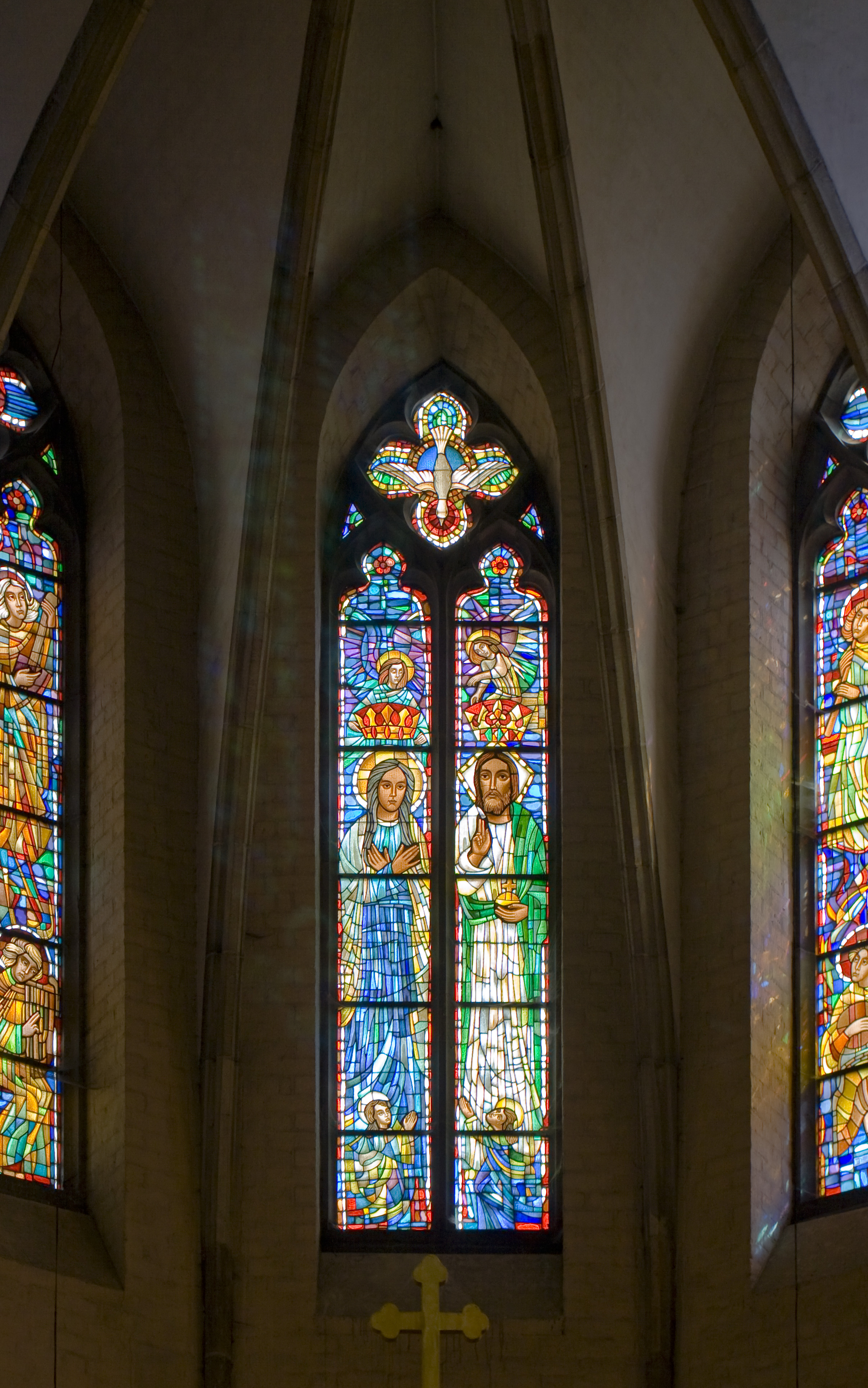
Stained glass window

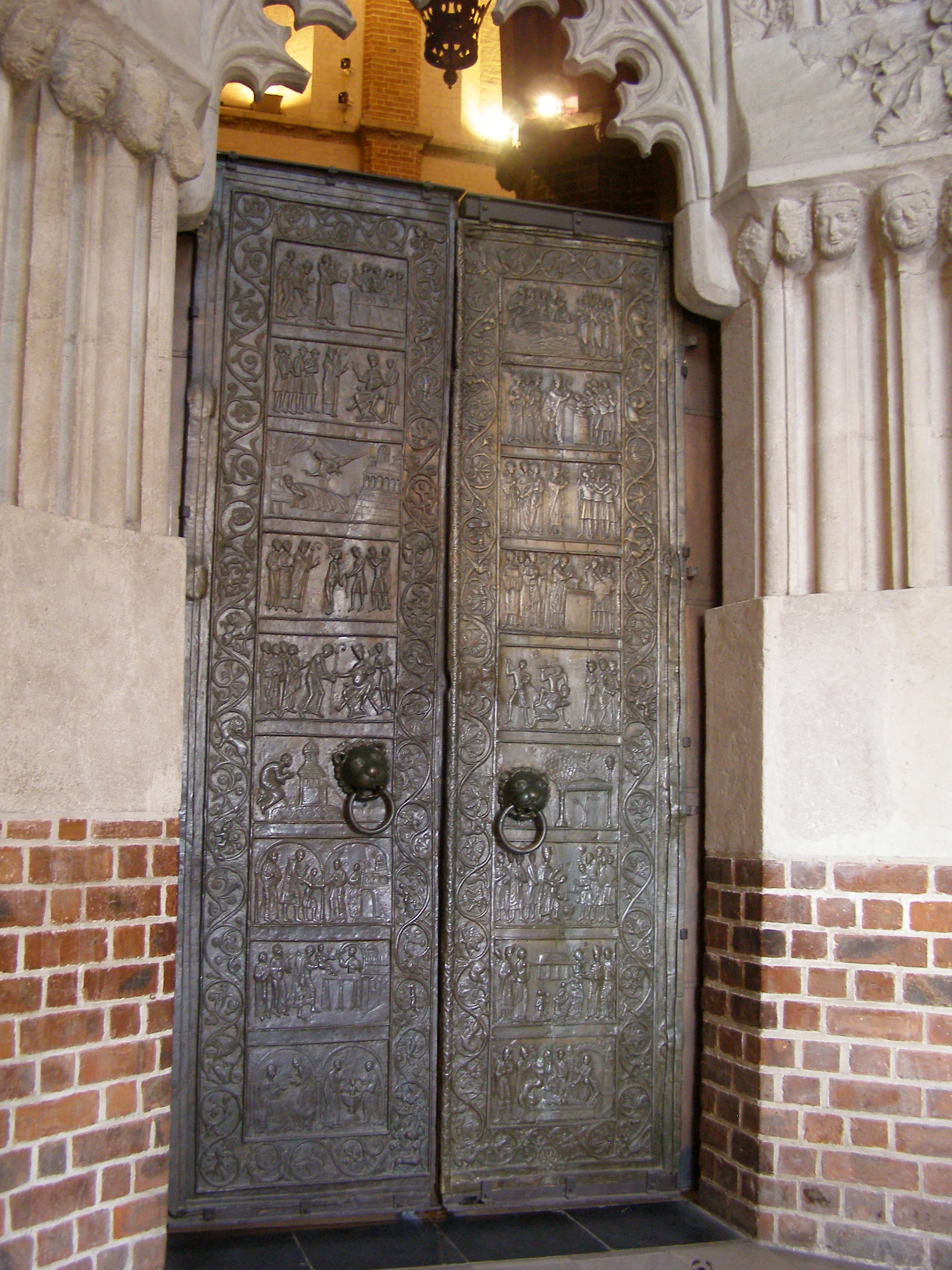
12th-century Gniezno Doors

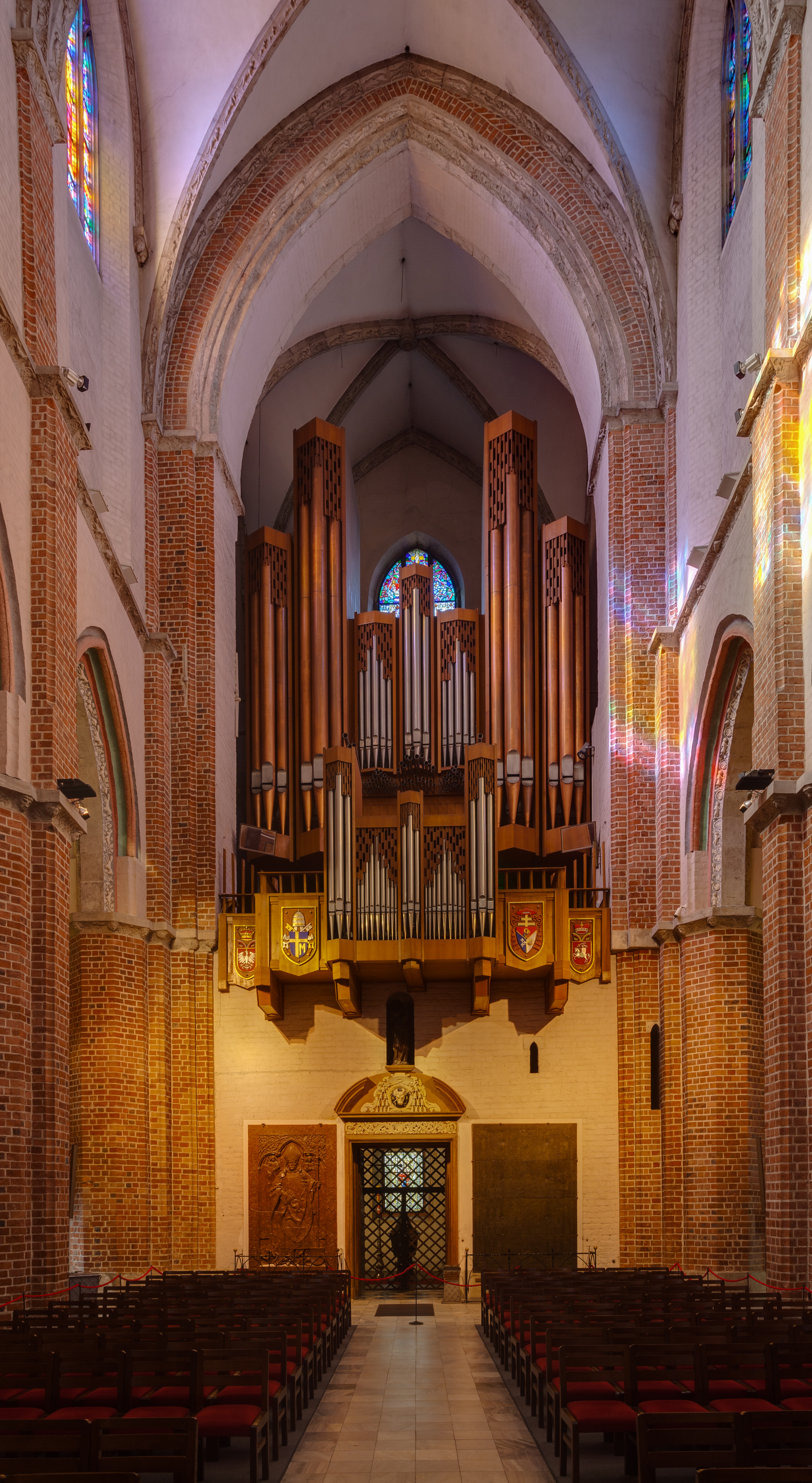
Pipe organ

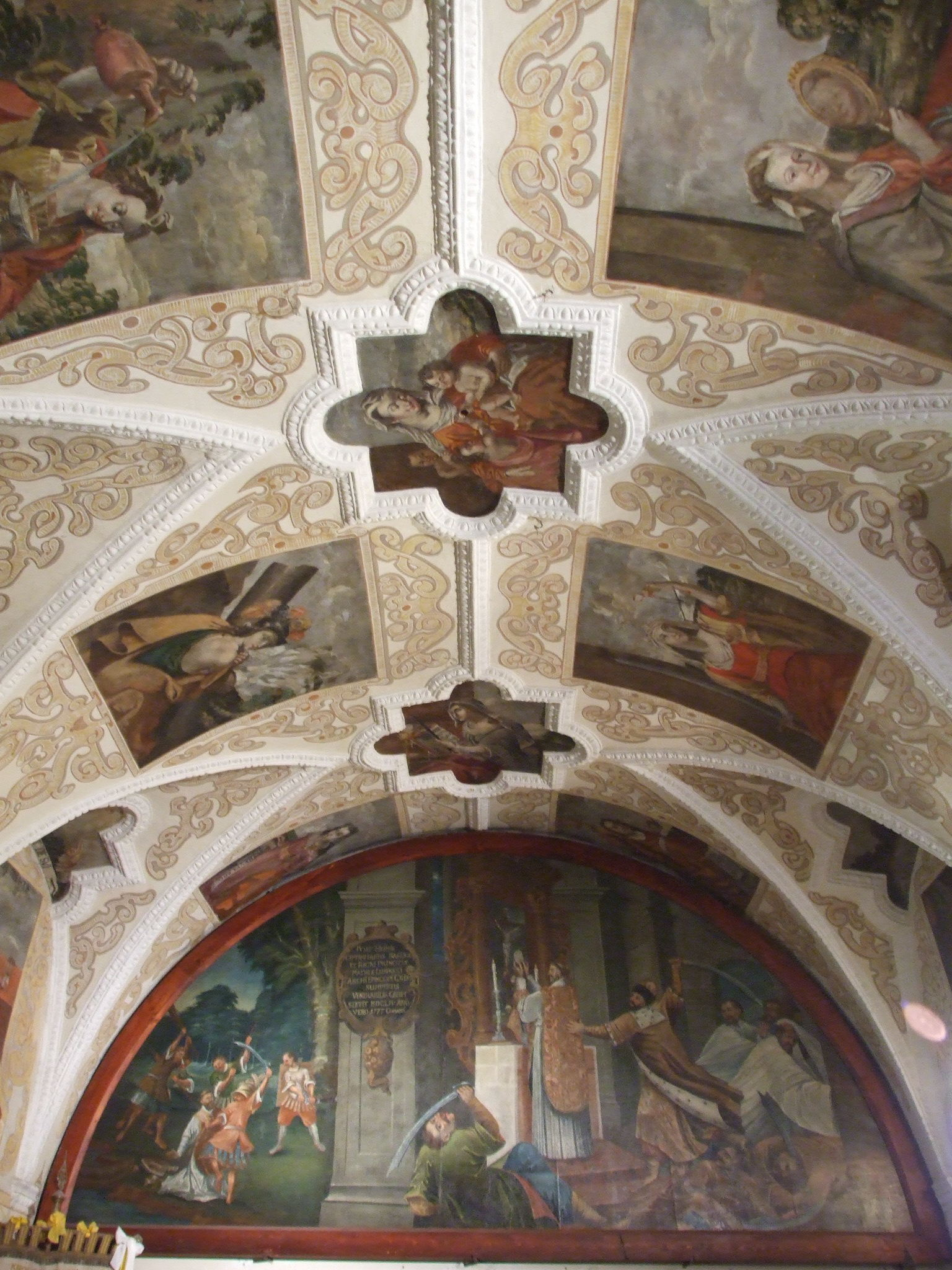
Rib vault with 17th-century paintings

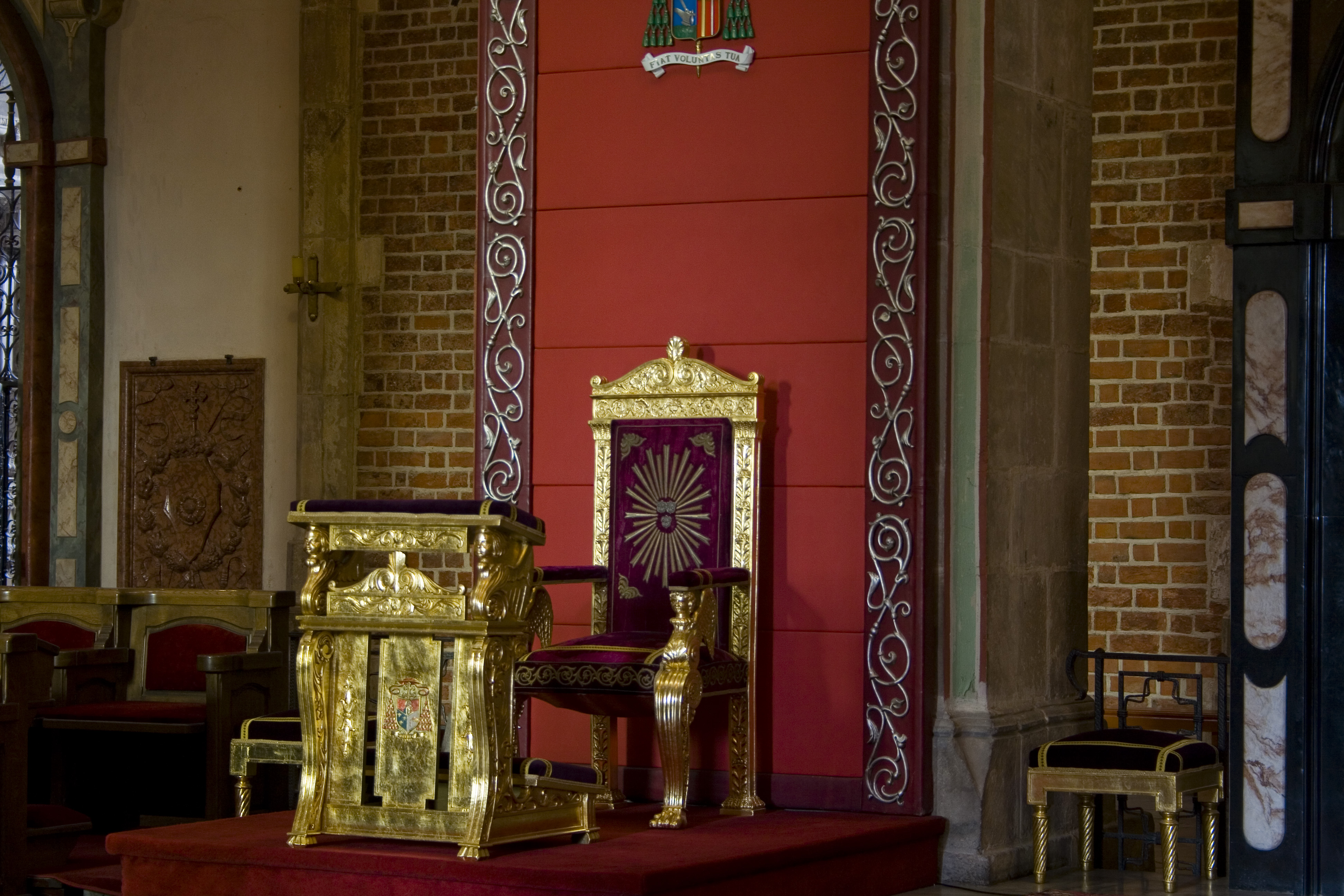
Episcopal throne

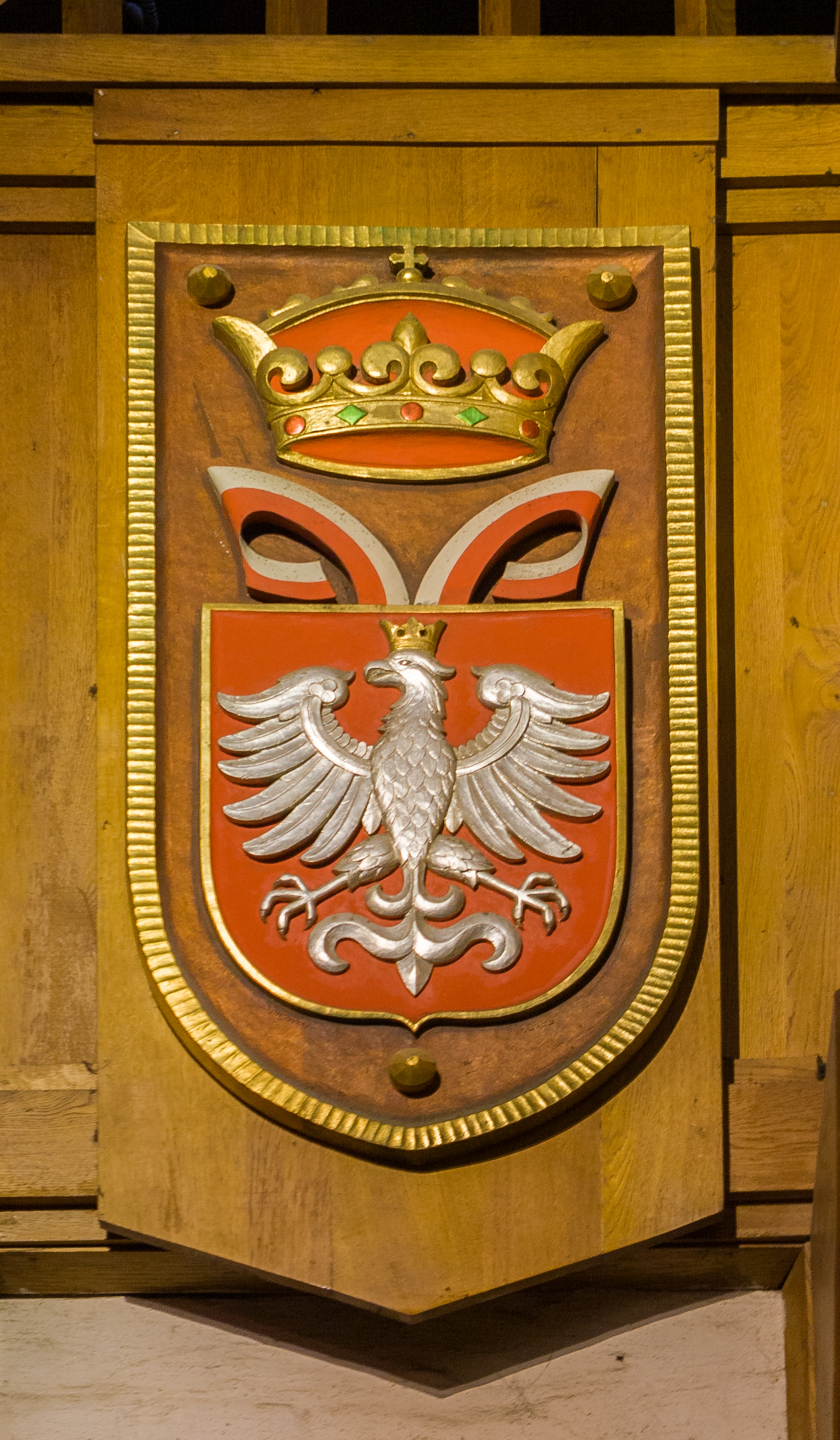
National coat of arms of Poland within the cathedral

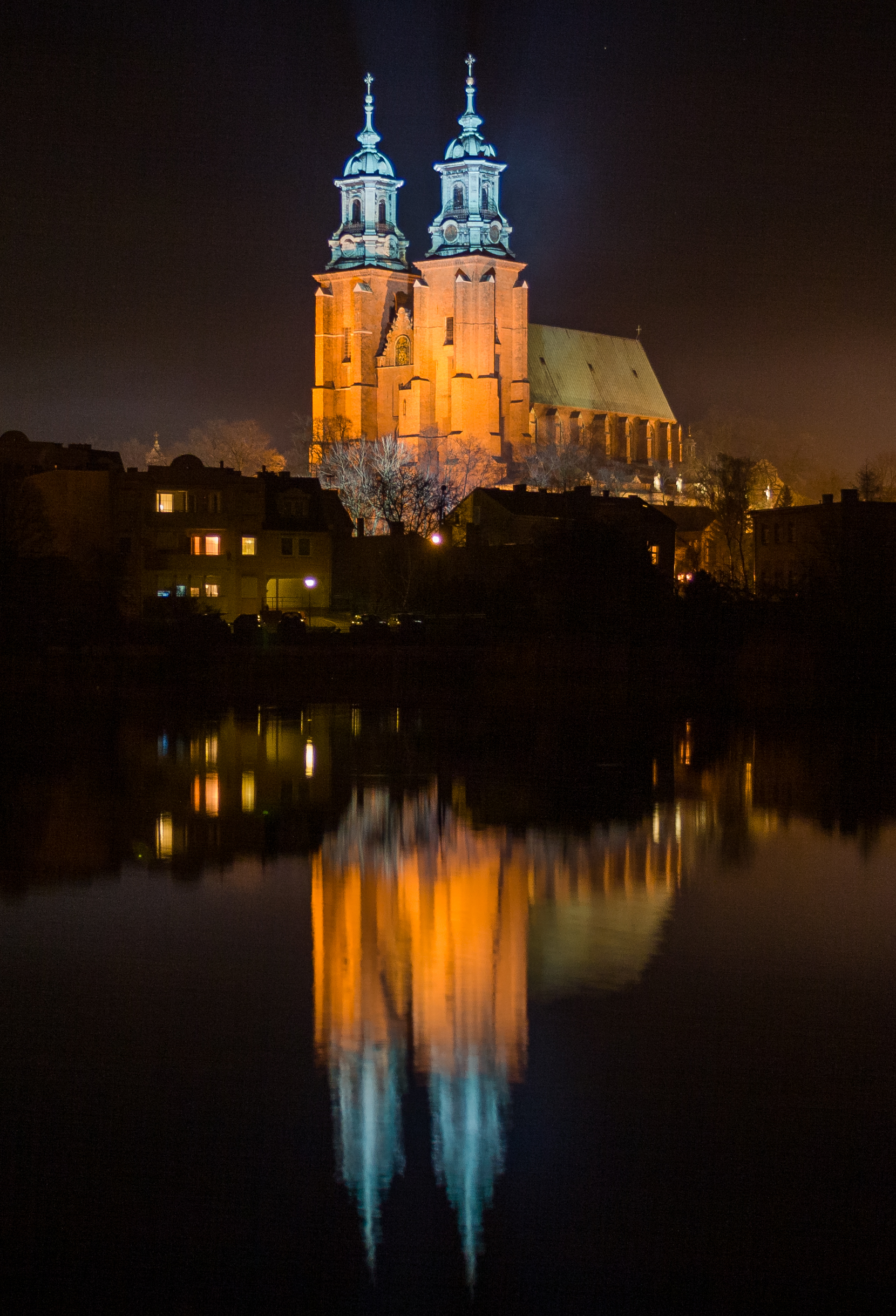
Night view with water reflection

== Bibliography ==
- Gabriela Mikołajczyk: Zabytki Katedry Gnieźnieńskiej. Gniezno: Prymasowskie Wydawnictwo „Gaudentinum”, 1992. ISBN 83-85654-01-1.
- Tadeusz Dobrzeniecki: Drzwi Gnieźnieńskie. Kraków: 1953.
- Tomasz Janiak, Z badań nad przestrzenią liturgiczną romańskiej katedry w Gnieźnie, w: Architektura romańska w Polsce. Nowe odkrycia i interpretacje, Materiały z sesji naukowej w MPPP, Gniezno 2009
- Narodowy Instytut Dziedzictwa: Rejestr zabytków nieruchomych – województwo wielkopolskie (pol.). 31 marca 2015. [dostęp 6.05.2010].
- Katedra w Gnieźnie (970–1945). [dostęp 2010-01-14].
- Włodzimierz Łęcki: Gniezno. Poznań: WPT Przemysław, 1980, s. 12–18. ISBN T-17/2322.
- Katedra Gnieźnieńska. [dostęp 2010-01-14].
- Dzieje Polski. [dostęp 2009-08-14].
- M. Rożek Polskie koronacje i korony – wyd. KAW, 1987.
- Katedra Prymasowska w Gnieźnie. [dostęp 2010-01-14].

== Online tour ==
- Aarchidiecezja.pl – Panorama..
