= Sophia of Bavaria (1105–1145) =

12th-century German noblewoman

- Duchess of Zähringen; Margravine of Styria
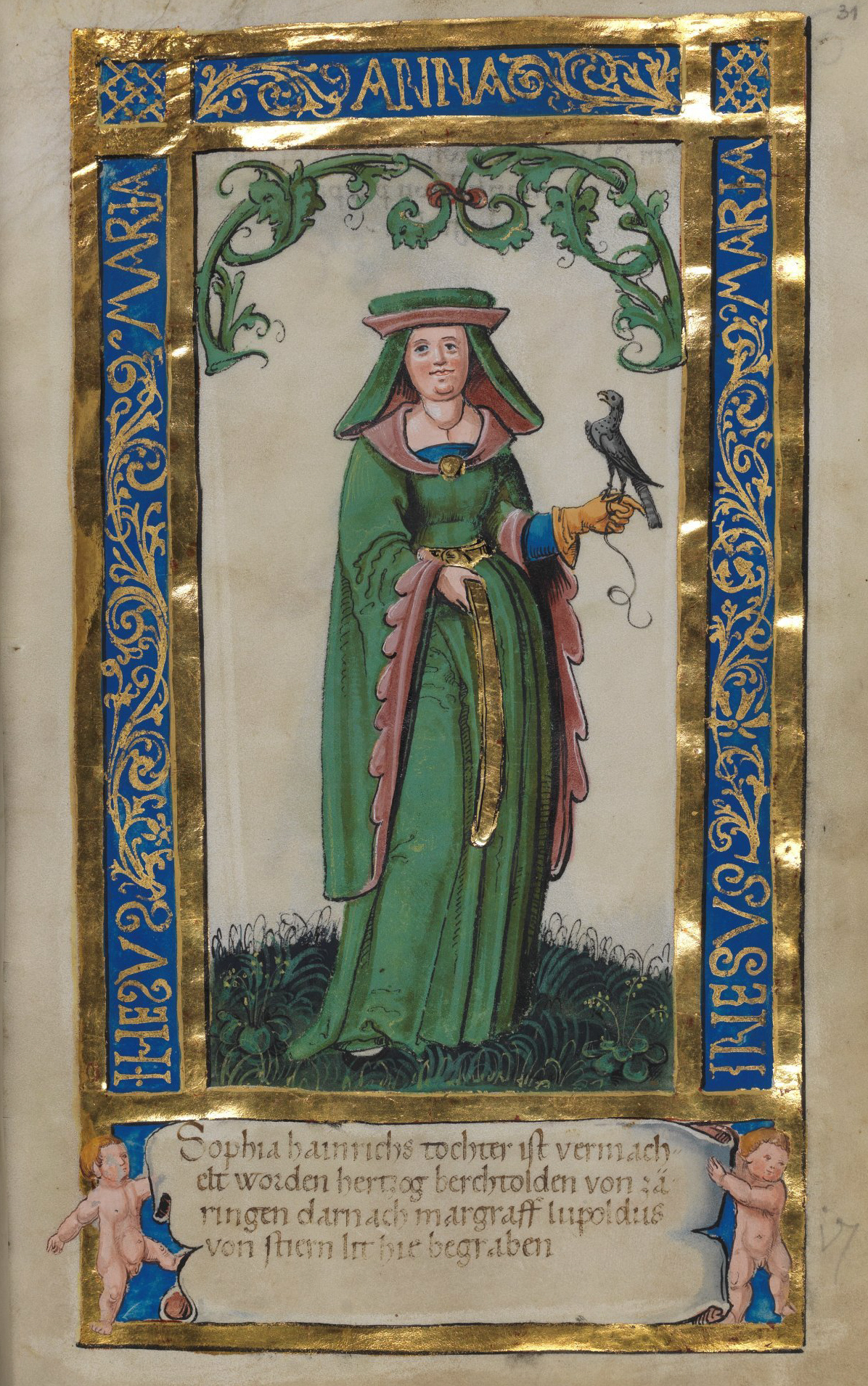
- Born: 1105
- Died: 1145 (aged 39–40)
- Spouse: Berthold III, Duke of Zähringen; Leopold of Styria
- Issue: Ottokar III of Styria
- House: Welf
- Father: Henry IX, Duke of Bavaria
- Mother: Wulfhilde of Saxony

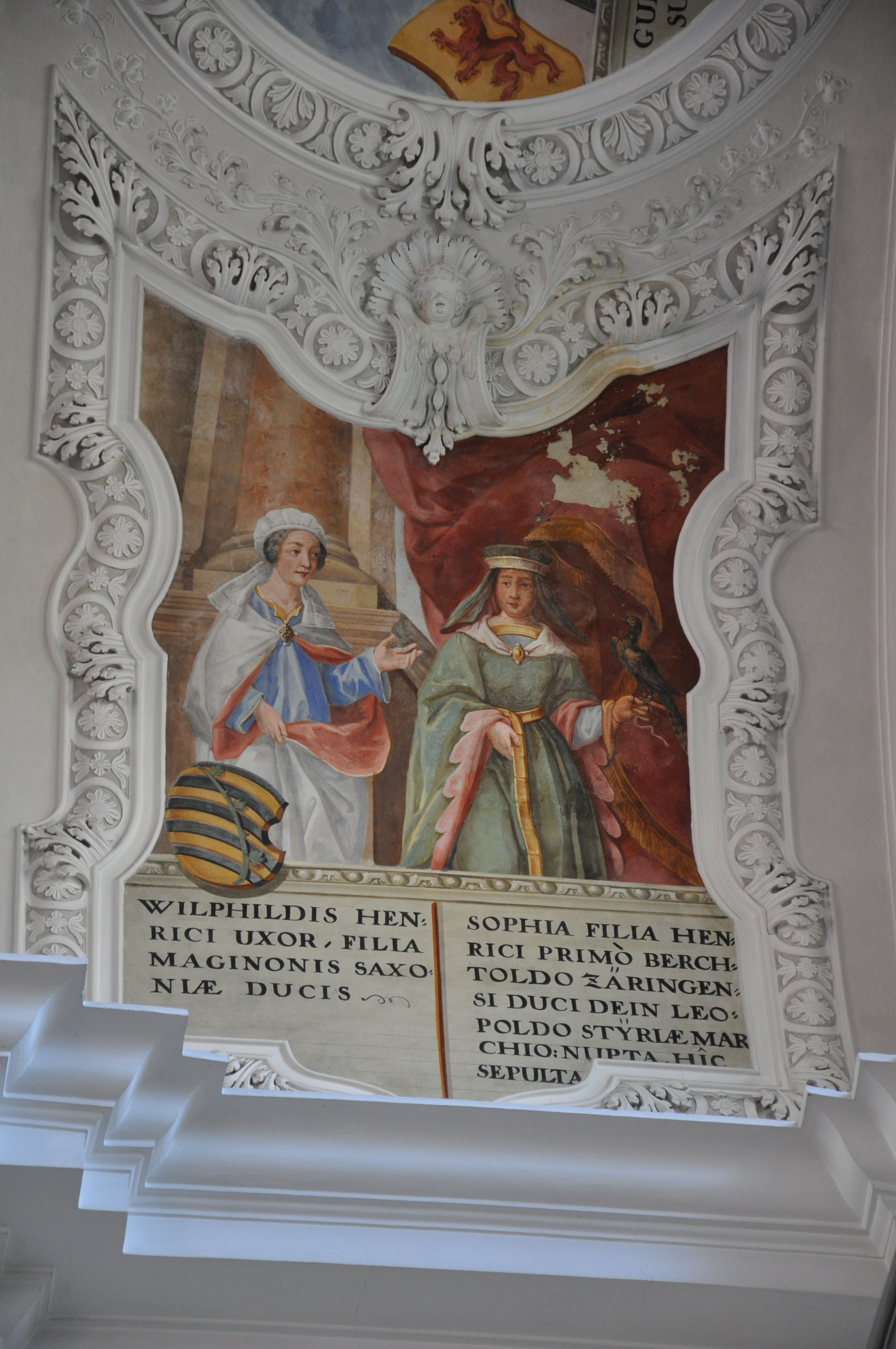
Sophia (right) with her mother Wulfhilde in a fresco in Weingarten Abbey

Sophia of Bavaria (1105–1145) was a German noblewoman and nun. Through her marriages she was the Duchess of Zähringen and the Margravine of Styria.

== Biography ==
Sophia of Bavaria was born in 1105 to Henry IX, Duke of Bavaria and his wife Wulfhilde of Saxony. She was a member of the House of Welf and was the sister of Henry X, Duke of Bavaria; Welf VI; Judith of Bavaria, Duchess of Swabia; and Conrad of Bavaria. Her first husband was Berthold III, Duke of Zähringen, who was killed in 1122. After her first husband's death, she married Leopold of Styria. In 1124 she gave birth to a son, Ottokar. Her second husband died in 1129, shortly after founding the Rein Abbey. After his death, Sophia continued to fund the building of the abbey. She and Bernard of Trixen served as co-regents over the March of Styria until her son came of age in 1139. In her later life she took religious vows and joined the Admont Abbey. She died in 1145.
