= Henry the Proud =

12th-century Bavarian nobleman

- Duke of Bavaria
- Born: c. 1108
- Died: 20 October 1139; Quedlinburg
- Burial: Imperial Cathedral of Königslutter
- Spouse: Gertrude of Süpplingenburg
- Issue: Henry the Lion
- House: Welf
- Father: Henry IX, Duke of Bavaria
- Mother: Wulfhilde of Saxony

Henry the Proud (German: Heinrich der Stolze) (c. 1108 – 20 October 1139), a member of the House of Welf, was Duke of Bavaria (as Henry X) from 1126 to 1138 and Duke of Saxony (as Henry II) as well as Margrave of Tuscany and Duke of Spoleto from 1137 until his death. In 1138 he was a candidate for the election as King of the Romans but was defeated by Conrad of Hohenstaufen.

== Family ==
Henry was the second son of Duke Henry IX of Bavaria and Wulfhilde, daughter of Duke Magnus of Saxony. He was thus not only a member of the Welf family, but, what was quite important, also senior heir of the Saxon House of Billung. Henry came of age in 1123, in 1126 his father retired to Weingarten Abbey where he and his wife died shortly afterwards. As his elder brother Conrad entered the Cistercian Order, Henry was enfeoffed with the Duchy of Bavaria. He shared the family possessions in Saxony, Bavaria and Swabia with his younger brother Welf VI.

In 1127, Henry married Gertrude, the only child of King Lothair III of Germany. Henry's father had been promised her marriage and inheritance as reward for his changing to support Lothair in the royal election of 1125 against the Hohenstaufen rival Duke Frederick II of Swabia. Gertrude was heir of the properties of three Saxon dynasties: the House of Supplinburg, the Brunonids, and the counts of Northeim. The marriage marked the expansion of power of the Welf dynasty, Bavarian dukes since 1070, to the northern parts of Germany. The couple had a son, Henry the Lion.

== Career ==
Henry was a loyal supporter in the warfare between his father-in-law King Lothair and the Hohenstaufen brothers, Duke Frederick II (who was Henry's brother-in-law, having been married to his sister Judith) and Conrad, then duke in Franconia and anti-king of Germany. While engaged in this struggle, Henry was also occupied in suppressing a rising in Bavaria, led by Count Frederick of Bogen, during which both duke and count sought to establish their own candidates as bishop of Regensburg. After a war of devastation, Count Frederick submitted in 1133, and two years later the Hohenstaufen brothers made their peace with Emperor Lothair.

In 1136, Henry accompanied his father-in-law to Italy, and taking command of a Bavarian division of the Imperial army marched into the south Italian Kingdom of Sicily up to Bari, devastating the land as he went. Having distinguished himself by his military abilities during this campaign, Henry was appointed as margrave of Tuscany, succeeding Engelbert III of Sponheim, and as Lothair's successor in the Duchy of Saxony. He was also given the private properties of late Margravine Matilda of Tuscany from the hands of Pope Innocent II.

When Emperor Lothair died on his way back from Italy in December 1137, Henry's wealth and position made him a formidable candidate for the German crown. According to the contemporary chronicler Otto of Freising, after his appointment as Duke of Saxony he boasted of a realm stretching "from sea to sea, from Denmark to Sicily".

However, the same qualities which earned him the cognomen of "the Proud" aroused the jealousy of the princes and so ultimately prevented his election. The new king, Conrad III, demanded the Imperial Regalia which Henry had received from Lothair, and the duke in return asked for his investiture with the Saxon duchy. But Conrad, who feared his power, refused to assent to this on the pretext that it was unlawful for two duchies to be in one hand.

Attempts at a settlement failed, and when in July 1138 Henry refused to take the oath of allegiance, he was banned and deprived of both his duchies. Bavaria was given to the Babenberg margrave Leopold IV of Austria, a half-brother of the new king Conrad. Saxony, which he had attempted to hold but was not officially invested with, was given to the Ascanian count Albert the Bear, son of Eilika of Saxony, a younger daughter of the last Billung duke Magnus.

== Death and aftermath ==
In 1139 Henry succeeded in expelling his enemies from Saxony and was preparing to attack Bavaria when he suddenly died in Quedlinburg. Henry is buried in the Imperial Cathedral of Königslutter next to his parents-in-law Emperor Lothair and Richenza of Northeim. His death left his son Henry the Lion underage who later would be given Saxony, while Henry II, Duke of Austria received Bavaria.

Conrad the Priest probably wrote the Rolandslied, a German version of the Chanson de Roland, while in Henry's service, at the request of Queen Gertrude.

== Sources ==
- Davis, R.H.C. (2013). Moore, R.I. (ed.). A History of Medieval Europe: From Constantine to Saint Louis (3rd ed.). Routledge. ISBN 978-0-582-78462-8.
- Previté-Orton, C. W. (1979). Shorter Cambridge Medieval History. Vol. 1: The Later Roman Empire to the Twelfth Century. Cambridge University Press.

Henry the Proud House of Welf Born: c. 1108 Died: 20 October 1139
Regnal titles
Preceded by Lothair	Duke of Saxony; 1137–1139	Succeeded by Albert the Bear
Preceded by Henry the Black	Duke of Bavaria; 1126–1138	Succeeded by Leopold the Generous
Preceded by Engelbert	Margrave of Tuscany; Duke of Spoleto; 1137–1139	Succeeded by Ulrich
