= Berthold III =

Berthold III may refer to:

- Berthold III, Duke of Zähringen (c. 1085–1122)
- Berthold III of Andechs (c. 1110/1122–1188)
