= Imperial Cathedral =

Imperial Cathedral may refer to:

- Imperial Cathedrals, a cathedral linked to the German emperors

In Germany:

- Aachen Cathedral, Aachen
- Bamberg Cathedral, Bamberg
- Frankfurt Cathedral, Frankfurt
- Speyer Cathedral, Speyer
- Mainz Cathedral, Mainz

In Russia:

- Feodorovsky Imperial Cathedral, Pushkin, Pushkinsky District
- Smolny Cathedral, Saint Petersburg
