= Henry IX of Bavaria =

Duke of Bavaria (1075–1126)

Henry IX
- Duke of Bavaria
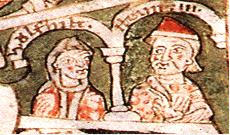
- Henry IX and his wife Wulfhilde, Historia Welforum (12th century)
- Born: 1075
- Died: 13 December 1126 (aged 50–51); Ravensburg, Swabia
- Burial: Weingarten Abbey
- Spouse: Wulfhilde of Saxony
- Issue: Judith; Conrad; Henry X the Proud; Welf VI; Sophia
- House: Welf
- Father: Welf I, Duke of Bavaria
- Mother: Judith of Flanders

Henry IX (c. 1075 – 13 December 1126), also known as Henry the Black (German: Heinrich der Schwarze), was a member of the House of Welf and Duke of Bavaria from 1120 until his death.

== Life and reign ==
Henry was the second son of Duke Welf I of Bavaria (died 1101), from his marriage with Judith, daughter of Count Baldwin IV of Flanders. As a young man, he administered the family's Este property south of the Alps.

Through his marriage to Wulfhilde, daughter of Duke Magnus of Saxony, about 1095, he acquired part of the Billung estates around Lüneburg (the nucleus of the later Welf duchy of Brunswick-Lüneburg). He aspired to succeed his father-in-law as Saxon duke when Magnus died without male heirs in 1106, but was denied as the new king Henry V enfeoffed his follower Count Lothair of Supplinburg.

Duke Henry nevertheless upheld close relations with the ruling Salian dynasty. In 1116, he joined Emperor Henry V's second Italian campaign to seize the estates of late Margravine Matilda of Tuscany. He succeeded his elder brother Welf II as Bavarian duke, when the latter died childless in 1120. Henry was also instrumental in bringing about the 1122 Concordat of Worms, ending the long-lasting Investiture Controversy between Pope and Emperor.

In the early 1120s, Henry commissioned the Genealogia Welforum, a family history in Latin, composed at Weingarten Abbey. He may have been prompted by the canonization of Bishop Conrad of Constance in 1123. Conrad was a Welf and his canonization stimulated Henry's interest in his ancestors. At the same time, Henry made an inventory of his family's tombs.

Duke Henry played a vital role in the royal election of 1125: first supporting his son-in-law, the Hohenstaufen duke Frederick II of Swabia, he switched his allegiance to his old rival Duke Lothair of Saxony—probably after Lothair promised that Gertrude, his only daughter and heir, would marry Henry's son Henry the Proud. The marriage was concluded in May 1127. The estrangement between the Welf and Hohenstaufen dynasties ("Guelphs and Ghibellines") lasted until the 13th century.

After Lothair won the tumultuous election, he imposed an Imperial ban on Frederick II, however, the king's forces were not able to conquer the Hohenstaufen territories in Swabia. In 1126 Henry abdicated as Bavarian duke in favour of his second son Henry the Proud and retired to the family foundation of Weingarten Abbey in Upper Swabia, possibly to not be obliged to participate in the prosecution of his son-in-law.

Henry died shortly thereafter and was buried in Weingarten. His wife Wulfhilde outlived him by only 16 days. Henry's epithet "the Black" has not been recorded before the 13th century. Both Emperor Frederick Barbarossa and his bitter rival Henry the Lion were his grandsons.

== Marriage and children ==
Henry and Wulfhilde had eight children:

- Judith, married Frederick II, Duke of Swabia
- Conrad (died 17 March 1126)
- Henry X the Proud, married Gertrude of Süpplingenburg, who succeeded his father as Duke of Bavaria
- Welf VI (died 1191)
- Sophia, married Berthold III, Duke of Zähringen and later Margrave Leopold of Styria
- Wulfhild, married Rudolf I, Count of Bregenz
- Mathilde, married Diepold IV, Margrave of Vohburg and Count Gebhard III of Sulzbach
- Adalbert, Abbot of Corvey

== Sources ==
- Barber, Malcolm (2004). The Two Cities: Medieval Europe 1050–1320. Routledge.
- Lyon, Jonathan R. (2013). Princely Brothers and Sisters. Cornell University Press.
- Luscombe, David; Riley-Smith, Jonathan, eds. (2006). The New Cambridge Medieval History. Cambridge University Press.

== Literature ==
- Bernd Schneidmüller: Die Welfen. Herrschaft und Erinnerung (819–1252) (= Urban-Taschenbücher 465). Kohlhammer Verlag, Stuttgart etc., 2000, ISBN 3-17-014999-7, pp. 149 ff.
- Sigmund Ritter von Riezler (1880). "Heinrich IX" . Allgemeine Deutsche Biographie (in German). Vol. 11. Leipzig: Duncker & Humblot. pp. 461–462.
- Kurt Reindel (1969). "Heinrich IX. der Schwarze". Neue Deutsche Biographie (in German). Vol. 8. Berlin: Duncker & Humblot. pp. 343–343. (full text online).

Henry IX of Bavaria House of Welf Born: 1075 Died: 1126
Regnal titles
| Preceded by Welf II | Duke of Bavaria; 1120–1126 | Succeeded by Henry X |
