= Ottokar III of Styria =

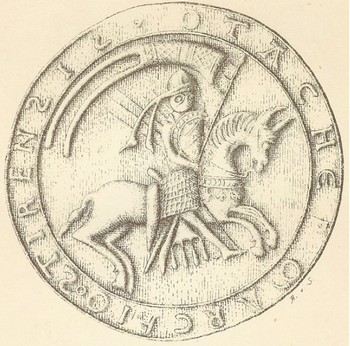
Ottokar III of Styria

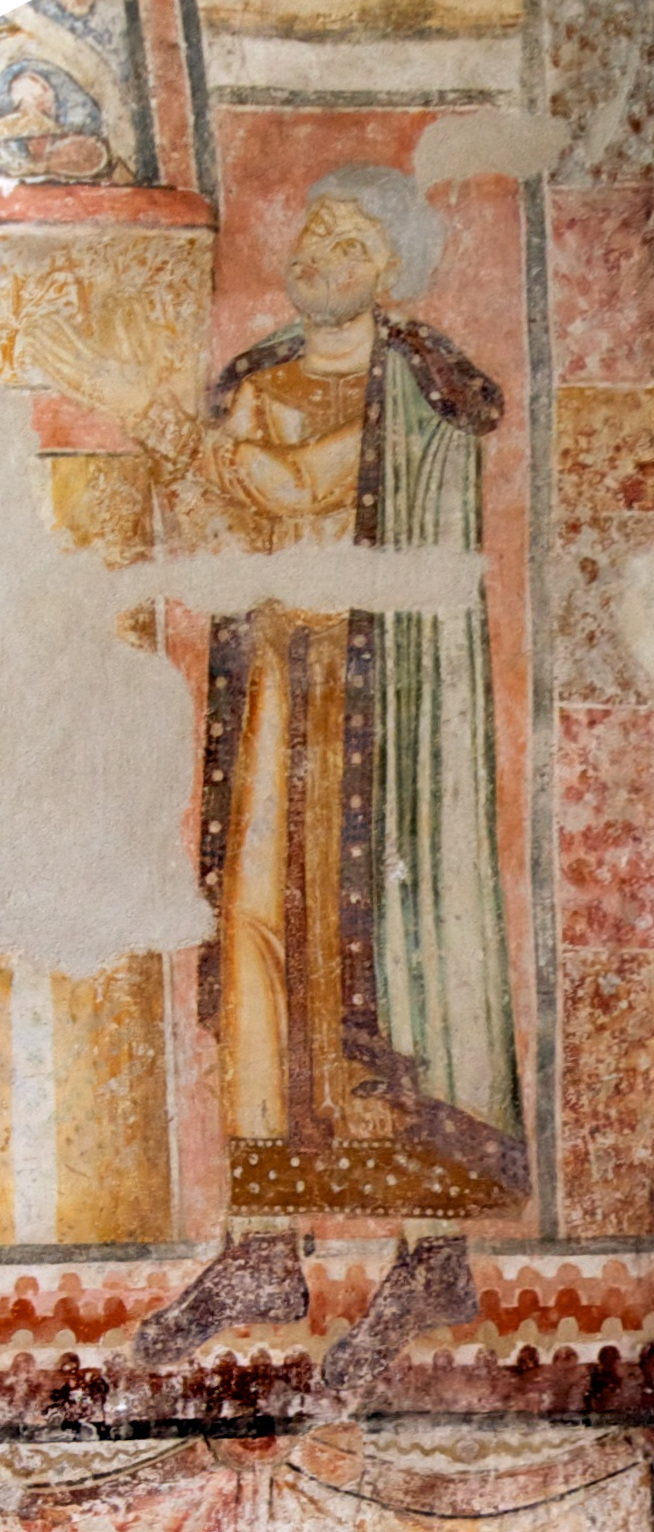
Fresco in the St. John chapel, Pürgg, Styria, 12th century

Ottokar III (c. 1124 – December 31, 1164) was Margrave of Styria from 1129 until 1164.

== Biography ==
He was the son of Leopold the Strong and Sophia of Bavaria, and father of Ottokar IV, the last of the dynasty of the Otakars. His wife was Kunigunde of Chamb-Vohburg.

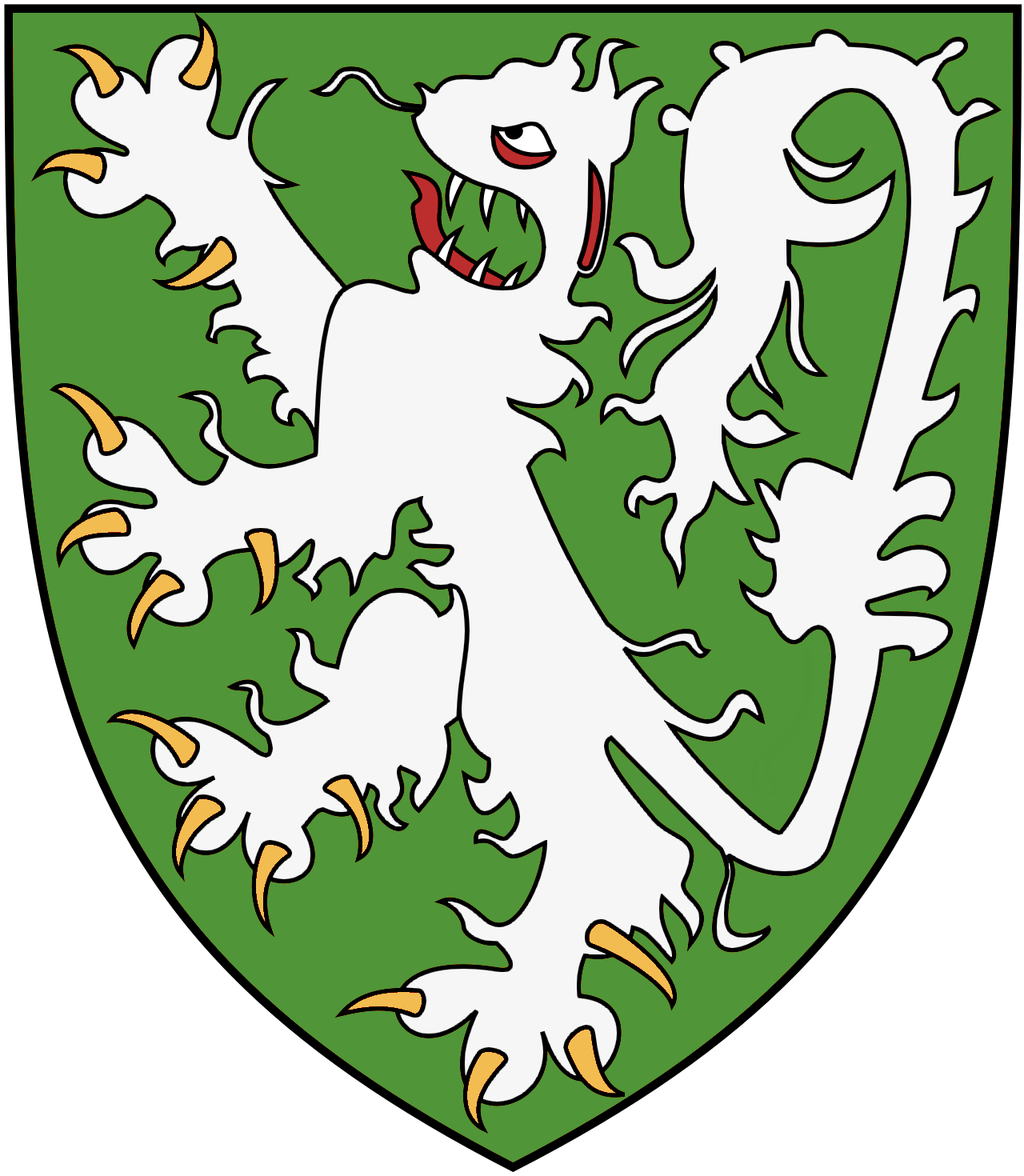
The arms of Ottokar III: Vert a panther argent rampant

From the Marburg line of the Counts of Sponheim, he inherited parts of Lower Styria between the Drave and Save rivers in what is today Slovenia. From his uncle, the last Count of Formbach, he inherited the County of Pitten in 1158, which is today in Lower Austria, but remained part of Styria until the 16th century. To improve connection to that territory, he improved the roads across the Semmering Pass. He also erected a hospital in Spital am Semmering in 1160 as well as completing the colonization of the area around the Traisen and Gölsen rivers.

Ottokar exercised seigniorage over natural resources of his realm, extended territorial rule and minted his own coins. He also founded the Augustinian monastery of Vorau Abbey and founded and supported the Carthusian monastery of Seitz.

After the Second Crusade, he brought Byzantine craftsmen to Styria.

He was buried in his foundation at Seitz, but his body was later transferred to Rein Abbey in Styria.

Preceded by Leopold the Strong	Margrave of Styria; 1129–1164	Succeeded by Ottokar IV
