= Wulfhilde of Saxony =

German duchess

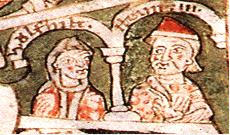
- Henry IX of Bavaria and Wulfhild of Saxony

Duchesses consort of Bavaria
- Born: 1072
- Died: 29 December 1126 (aged 53–54); Weingarten Abbey
- Burial: Weingarten Abbey
- Spouse: Henry IX, Duke of Bavaria
- Issue: Henry X, Duke of Bavaria; Conrad of Bavaria; Sophia of Bavaria; Judith of Bavaria, Duchess of Swabia; Matilda; Welf VI; Wulfhilde
- House: Billung
- Father: Magnus, Duke of Saxony
- Mother: Sophia of Hungary

Wulfhilde Billung of Saxony (1072 – 29 December 1126) was the eldest daughter of Magnus, Duke of Saxony, and Sophia of Hungary.

== Marriage and death ==
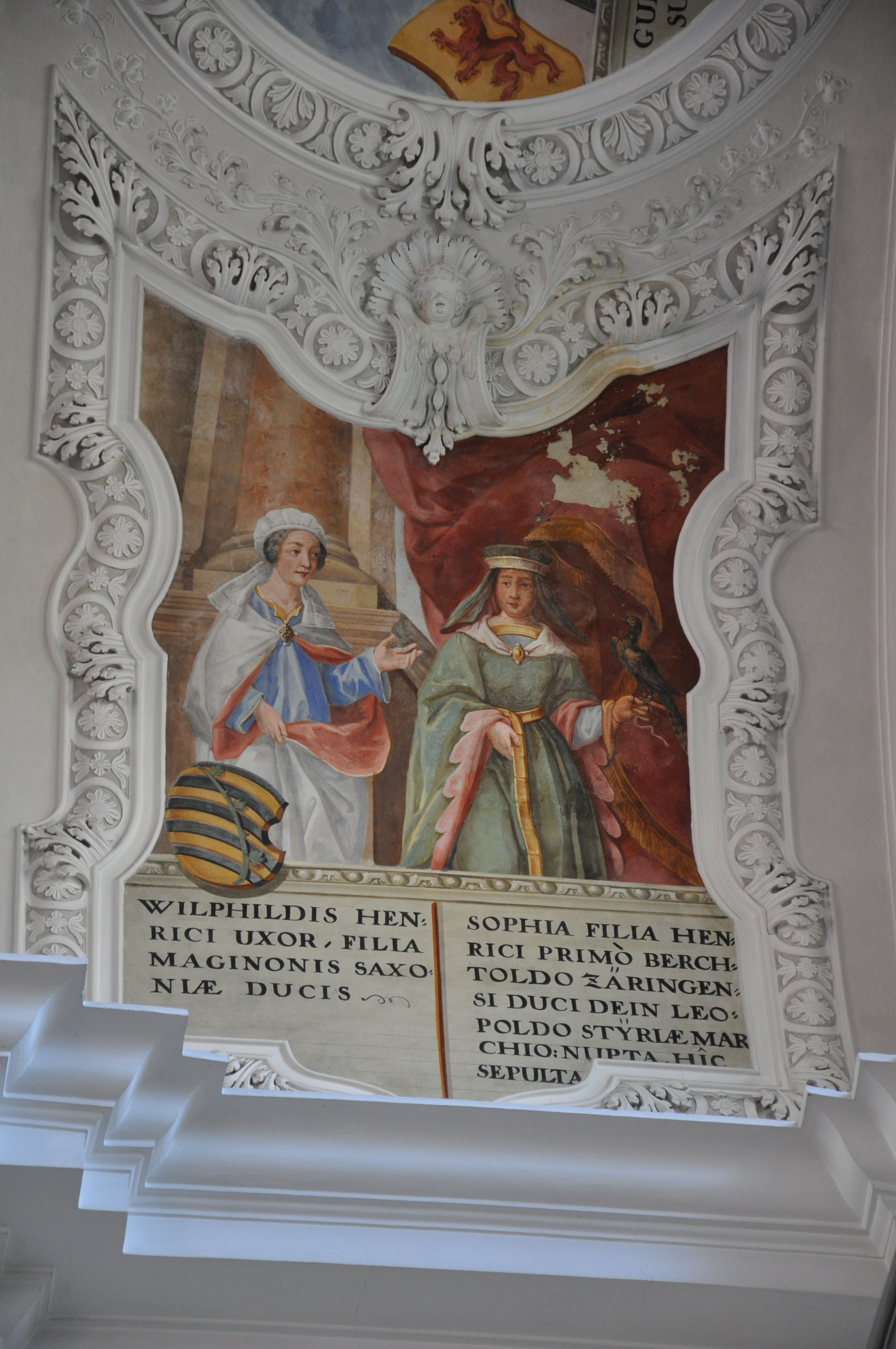
Wulfhild and her daughter Sophia in a fresco in Weingarten Abbey

In about 1095, she married Duke Henry IX of Bavaria. As a result of this marriage, part of the Billung possessions came into the hands of the House of Guelph. They had seven children:

- Henry X
- Conrad (died: 17 March 1126 in Bari, buried in Molfetta), a Cistercian monk and saint
- Sophia
- Judith
- Matilda (d. 1138), married Margrave Diephold IV of Vohburg (d. 1130) and Count Gebhard III of Sulzbach (d. 1188)
- Welf VI
- Wulfhilde, married Rudolf I, Count of Bregenz (d. 1160)

Wulfhilde died on 29 December 1126 and was buried at Weingarten Abbey.

== Sources ==
- Luscombe, David; Riley-Smith, Jonathan, eds. (2006). The New Cambridge Medieval History. Cambridge University Press.
