= 1138 imperial election =

1138 Holy Roman Empire royal election

- 7 March 1138

Elected by the stem dukes and the nobility Consensus needed to win (Note: Electors were required to reach a unanimous agreement on a single candidate to ensure a valid election.)
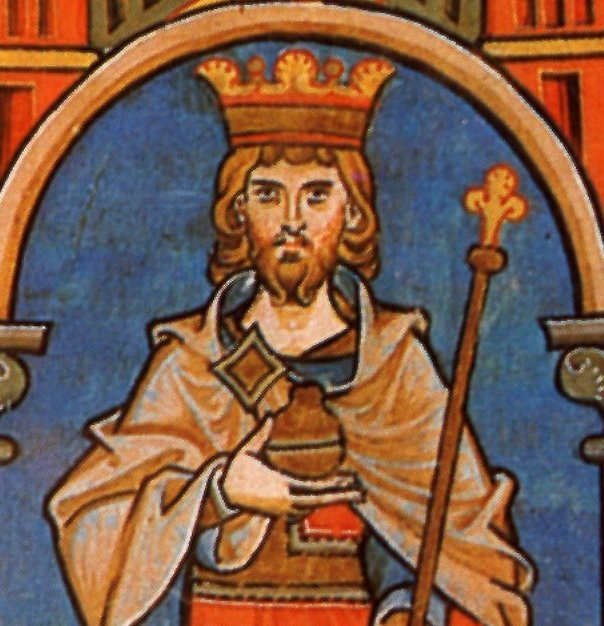

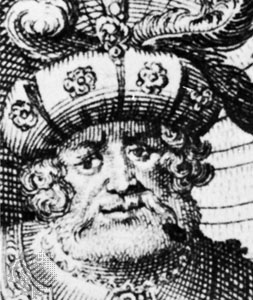
Candidate	Conrad III	Henry the Proud
House	Hohenstaufen	Welf
Result	Elected	Defeated
King before election
Lothair III
House of Supplinburg
Elected King
Conrad III
Hohenstaufen Dynasty

The imperial election of 1138 was an imperial election held to select the emperor of the Holy Roman Empire after the death of Lothair III in December 1137. The election took place in Koblenz on 7 March, eleven weeks before the scheduled date due to interference from Archbishop Albero of Trier.

Conrad III of Germany, who was previously an anti-king, was named Holy Roman Emperor as a result of the election, starting the Hohenstaufen imperial dynasty.
