= Judith of Bavaria, Duchess of Swabia =

Duchess of Swabia (1100–1130)

Judith of Bavaria
- Duchess of Swabia
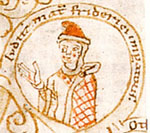
- Tenure: 1119/1121 – 27 August 1130
- Born: 19 May 1100; Bavaria, Holy Roman Empire
- Died: 27 August 1130 (aged 30); Germany
- Burial: Waldburg, Heiligen Forest, Alsace
- Spouse: Frederick II, Duke of Swabia
- Issue: Frederick I, Holy Roman Emperor; Bertha, Duchess of Lorraine
- House: Welf
- Father: Henry IX of Bavaria
- Mother: Wulfhilde of Saxony

Judith of Bavaria, Duchess of Swabia (19 May 1100 – 27 August 1130) was a duchess of Swabia by marriage to Frederick II, Duke of Swabia. She was the mother of Frederick I, Holy Roman Emperor, also known as "Barbarossa".

== Life ==
Judith was born 19 May 1100, the eldest daughter of Henry IX, Duke of Bavaria and Wulfhilde of Saxony, daughter of Magnus, Duke of Saxony and Sophia of Hungary, and thereby a member of the powerful German House of Welf. She had three brothers, Henry, Conrad and Welf; and three sisters, Sophia, Matilda and Wulfhild. (Note: The Historia Welforum names Iuditham, Mahtildem, Sophium and Wulfildem as the four daughters of Henricus dux ex Wulfilde. This order indicates that Judith was the eldest daughter.) She had, in addition to her seven legitimate siblings, one half-brother, Adalbert, born of her father's relationship with an unnamed mistress.

=== Duchess of Swabia ===
On an unknown date between 1119 and 1121, she became the first wife of Frederick II, Duke of Swabia (1090 – 6 April 1147); this dynastic marriage united the House of Welf and the House of Hohenstaufen, the two most powerful and influential families in Germany.

In 1125, her father initially supported the candidacy of her husband to succeed Emperor Henry V as King of Germany; however, he eventually switched his support to Lothar III, Holy Roman Emperor. The defection of Judith's father created an enmity between the Welfs and the Swabians that would have far-reaching consequences in Germany which would last throughout the 12th century. It is not known how this affected relations between Judith and her husband. No further children were born to the couple after the birth of their daughter Bertha in 1123.

She died on 27 August 1130 and was buried at Waldburg in Heiligen Forest, Alsace. Shortly after Judith's death Frederick married Agnes of Saarbrücken (d. ca. 1147), who was the daughter of Frederick, Count of Saarbrücken.

== Issue ==
She had two children:

- Frederick I Barbarossa, Holy Roman Emperor (1122 – 10 June 1190), married on 9 June 1156 Beatrice I, Countess of Burgundy, by whom he had 12 children.
- Bertha (also called Judith) of Swabia (1123 – 18 October 1194/25 March 1195), married in 1138 Matthias I, Duke of Lorraine, by whom she had seven children.

== Ancestry ==
Ancestors of Judith of Bavaria, Duchess of Swabia

Albert Azzo II, Margrave of Milan
Welf I, Duke of Bavaria
Kunigunde of Altdorf
Henry IX of Bavaria
Baldwin IV, Count of Flanders
Judith of Flanders
Eleanor of Normandy
Judith of Bavaria
Ordulf, Duke of Saxony
Magnus, Duke of Saxony
Wulfhild of Norway
Wulfhilde of Saxony
King Béla I of Hungary
Sophia of Hungary
Richeza/Adelaide of Poland
