= Leopold of Styria =

Leopold I of Styria
- Margrave of Styria
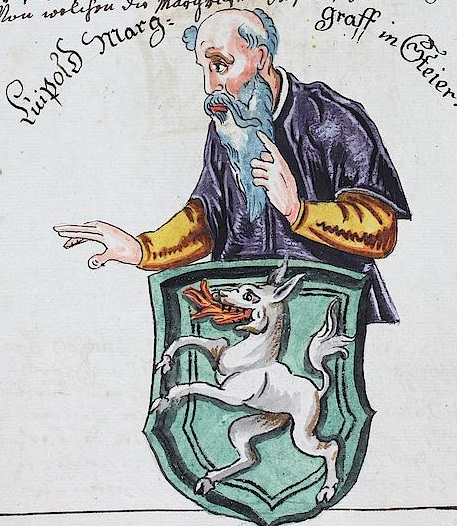
- Predecessor: Ottokar II
- Successor: Ottokar III
- Died: October 1129
- Burial: Rein Abbey, Austria
- Spouse: Sophia of Bavaria
- House: Otakars
- Father: Ottokar II
- Mother: Elisabeth of Austria

Leopold I of Styria, known as "the Brave" or "the Strong", served as the Margrave of Styria from 1122 until his death in 1129.

== Origin and family ==
Margrave Leopold I of Syria belonged to the House of Traungauer, a cadet branch stemming from the House of Otakar. He was born to Margrave Otakar II of Styria and Elisabeth of Austria. Leopold I entered into matrimony with Sophia, the widowed spouse of Duke Berthold III of Zähringen. They together had three children: Elisabeth, Margarethe, and their son and heir, Margrave Otakar III of Styria.

== Life ==
Leopold was actively involved in the governance of the realm during his father's reign, often referred to as "junior margrave" in historical documents. Following the death of his father, Otakar II of Styria, in 1122, Leopold inherited the title of Margrave of Styria, a pivotal moment often regarded as the "birth of Styria." He embarked on an ambitious endeavor to establish new municipalities and cities, contributing to the growth and development of the region. Leopold's attention also turned towards expanding his influence into territories held by the House of Eppenstein in Carinthia. Through diplomatic maneuvering and military campaigns, he successfully acquired key regions such as "Mark an der Mur," previously under Carinthian control.Furthermore, Leopold sought to integrate additional territories into his margraviate, including the Margrave in Ennstal and the City of Leoben. Together he and his heir, he expanded the territorial reach of Styria, extending as far as Semmering. Following the passing of Leopold I of Styria in October 1129, Sophie assumed regency over Styria for an extended period due to the young age of his son Margrave Ottokar III of Stryia, who was just 4 years old at the time of Leopold's demise.

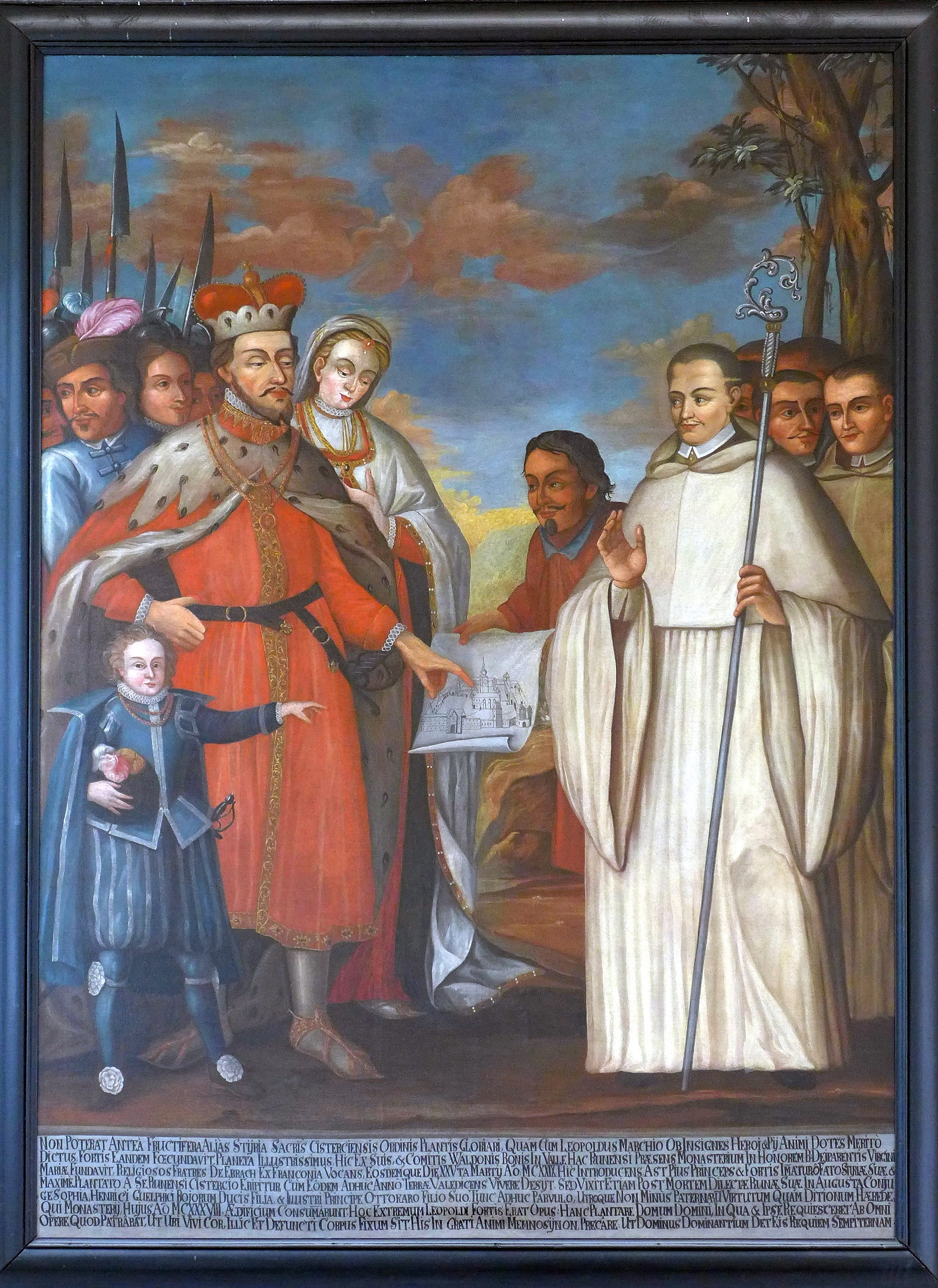
Leopold (left, in red clothes), Margrave of Styria

== Achievements ==
Leopold I of Styria, as the Margrave of Styria, built and founded numerous cities during his reign. Among the most notable are:

- Hartberg - Leopold I of Styria founded "Hartberg" in 1122.
- Graz - Leopold I of Styria granted a portion of Graz to the Lords of Wildon, entrusting them with the city's security.
- Gratwein-Straßengel - Rein Abbey was established by Leopold I around 1128 or 1129, with his burial within its walls following his passing. Although Leopold I did not witness the physical construction, as it began after his demise, his wife Sophie played a pivotal role in overseeing its realization.
- Steyr - Leopold I played a role in founding the Benedictine abbey.

Preceded by Ottokar II	Margrave of Styria; 1122–1129	Succeeded by Ottokar III
