= Neukloster Abbey =

Cistercian abbey in Wiener Neustadt, Austria

Coordinates: 47.8123°N 16.2468°E

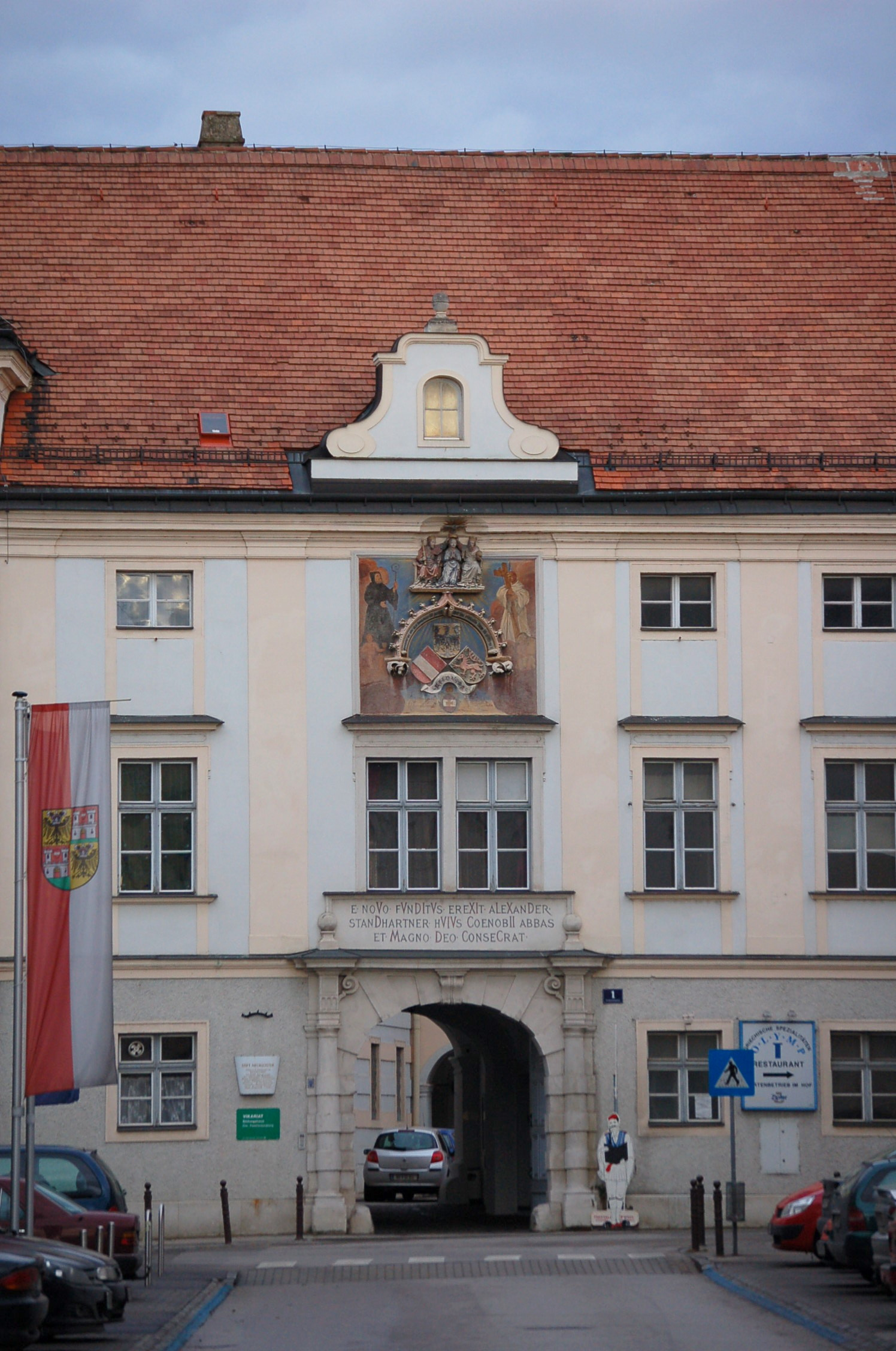
Renaissanceportal

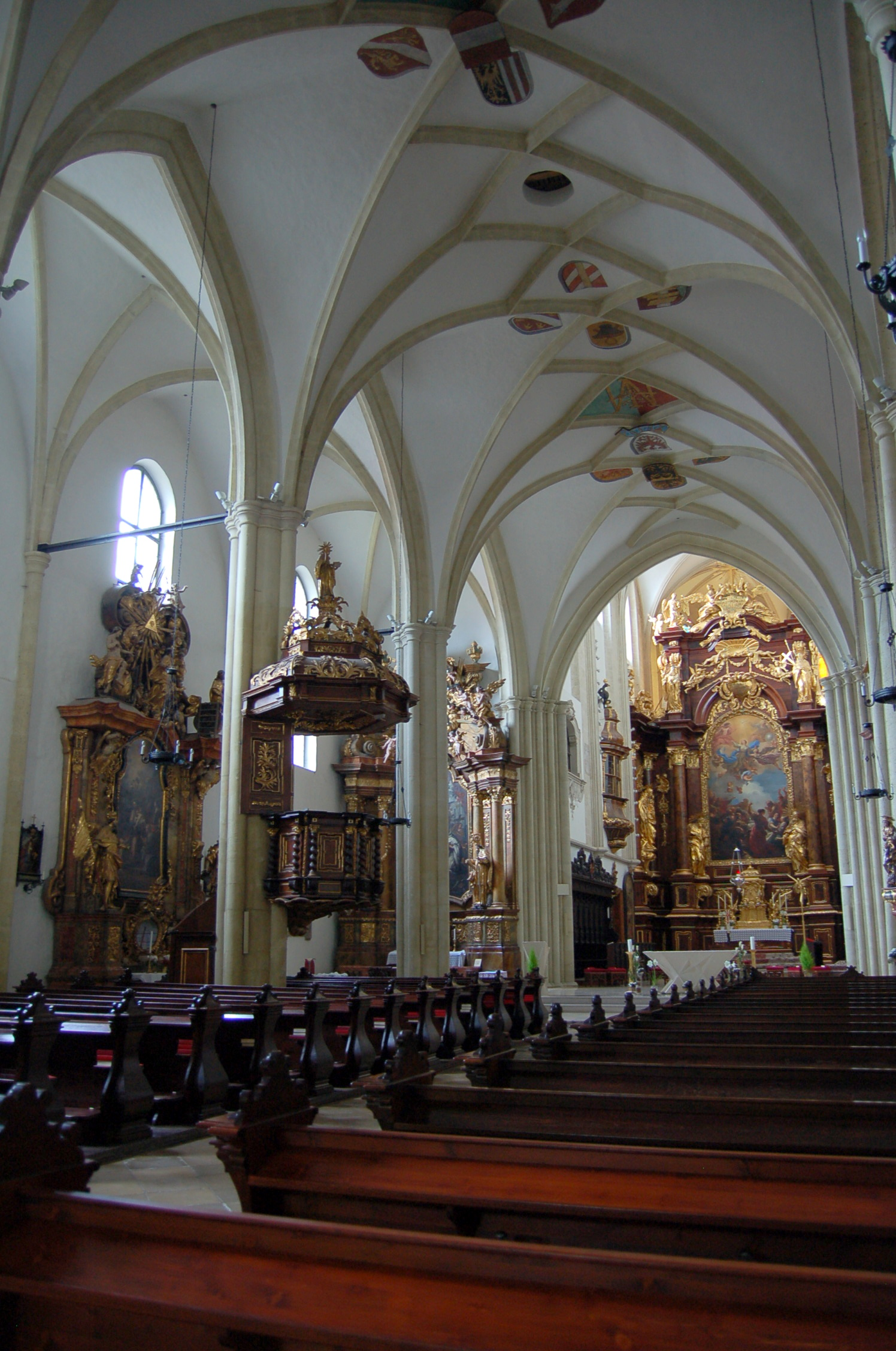
Interior of the abbey church

Neukloster Abbey was a Cistercian abbey in Wiener Neustadt, in Lower Austria. In 1881, it became a priory of Heiligenkreuz Abbey.

== History ==
Contrary to the Cistercian custom of only building monasteries in remote areas, an exception was made for King Frederick. Frederick succeeded in freeing up the Dominican monastery next to his residence (founded by Leopold VI in 1227) for Cistercians from Rein Abbey. Because of the new beginning compared to the previous Dominican monastery and in allusion to the Cistercian original monastery of Cîteaux as the novum monasterium par excellence, Frederick's court monastery was called the "new" monastery. The founding abbot was from Rein, but the second (from 1446) was Gottfried von Otterstätt, previously cellarer at Maulbronn Abbey.

In the decades following its foundation, the Neukloster monks were granted dispensations in order to work as pastors. Normally, laymen and women were not allowed to enter the Cistercians' convent churches, but a document from 1457 allows the presence of women at the rood screen during the celebration of mass in the Neukloster.

Emperor Frederick was imaginative when it came to the abbey's endowment: the fortress of Rohr near Wildon was confiscated as a rebel estate and donated to Neukloster. The previous owner had probably died as a partisan of Albrecht VI. An annual payment of 300 pounds pfennigs from the parish of St. Peter in Ljubljana was also made to the new monastery.

In 1446, a large carved altar was erected in the abbey church, which is now the Wiener Neustädter Altar in St. Stephen's Cathedral in Vienna.

In 1467, Eleonor of Portugal, the wife of Emperor Frederick, was buried in the apse of the abbey church. Three children of the imperial couple are also buried there. But the burial place for which the entire Cistercian foundation project had been intended did not materialize: Emperor Frederick himself was buried in St. Stephen's Cathedral in Vienna in a magnificent tomb that had originally been placed (empty) in the chancel of the Neuklosterkirche. There are several references to the imperial benefactor amidst the coats of arms along the nave's ceiling. The larger version of his famous AEIOU monogram appears twice.

From 1797 to October 1803, the monastery served as a residence for the governor of Lombardy, Archduke Ferdinand Karl of Austria-Este, his wife Maria Beatrice d'Este and their children, after they had been exiled during the Coalition Wars.

The Josephine reforms caused the monastery a great deal of trouble, but it was not abolished. In 1784, the church was rededicated as the second of Wiener Neustadt's parishes. In 1804, a monastery school was opened, which was transferred to state administration in 1871.

In 1793, Mozart's Requiem was performed in the collegiate church for the first time in its original purpose, during a Requiem Mass for Count Walsegg's deceased wife.

The monastery suffered for centuries from insufficient funding; economic problems were the reason that in 1880/81 the Neukloster monastery was united with Heiligenkreuz Abbey, some 30 km away, as a unio extinctiva; as the convent died out, the property became a Heiligenkreuz priory.

In May 2017, a collection of around 4,700 art objects, known as the Kunst- und Wunderkammer (Cabinet of Art and Wonders), was opened. The monastery was an essential part of the Lower Austrian State Exhibition in 2019. A "room within a room" made of glass was built for viewing the library. The east façade towards the garden, the Chapel of the Holy Cross, and the baroque refectory with its frescoes by Johann Baptist Bergl were also restored and refurbished.

== Neukloster Abbots ==
- Heinrich I. Sternberger (1444–1445)
- Godfried von Otterstet (1446–1460)
- Georg I. (1460)
- Johannes I. (1460–1482)
- Andreas I. (1483–1487)
- Petrus I. (1488–1489)
- Martin I. (1490–1505)
- Johannes Lindenlaub (1506–1515, later abbot of Stift Rein until 1529)
- Michael (1515–1524)
- Gregor (1525–1538)
- Johannes III. (1538–1540)
- Konrad Faber (1540–1545)
- Matthias I. (1548–1551)
- Gebhard Georg (1551, Rücktritt)
- Sebastian Gstaltner (1551–1552)
- Johannes Fein (1553–1557)
- Bartholomäus von Grudenegg (1557–1559)
- Johannes Helmstorffer (1559–1566)
- Christoph Erkl (1568–1586)
- Lorenz Laimbrod (1586–1590)
- Georg II. Gorian (1593–1598)
- Matthias II. Gülger (1600–1605, later abbot in Rein)
- Balthasar Fabrizius (1606–1618, later abbot in Neuberg)
- Ignaz Krafft (1618–1622, later abbot in Lilienfeld)
- Johann Jakob Pettard (1622–1640, resigniert)
- Bernhard Breil (1640–1649, later abbot in Baumgartenberg)
- Robert I. Notius (1649–1663)
- Mathäus Eisenbart (1663–1683)
- Alexander Standhartner (1683–1707)
- Robert II. Lang (1707–1728)
- Raimund Jungwirth (1728–1729)
- Benedikt Hell (1729–1746)
- Joseph Stübicher (1746–1775)
- Alberich Stingel (1775–1801)
- Anton Michael Wohlfarth (1801–1836)
- Anton II. Bilimek (1836–1839)
- Bernhard Schwindel (1839–1856)
- Benedikt Steiger (1857–1880, stepped down)

== Inscriptions ==
- Above the gate to the south aisle of the cloister, which was erected in 1767, is a text attributed to Bernhard von Clairvaux, from the Epistola ad Fratres de Monte Dei: In religione vivit homo purius, cadit rarius, surgit velocius, incedit cautius, quiescit securius, irrigatur frequentius, purgatur citius, moritur confidentius, remuneratur copiosius ("As a monk, a man lives more purely, falls less often, rises more quickly, walks more securely, sleeps better, becomes angry less often, becomes pure more quickly, dies more confidently and receives a greater reward").

== Other tombs ==
For Empress Eleonore, see above. The New Monastery is the burial place of the West Hungarian noble family of the Counts of Mattersdorf-Forchtenstein from Aragon (Spain).
