= Rein Abbey, Austria =

Cistercian monastery in Rein near Gratwein, Styria, in Austria

Coordinates: 47°08′16″N 15°16′58″E

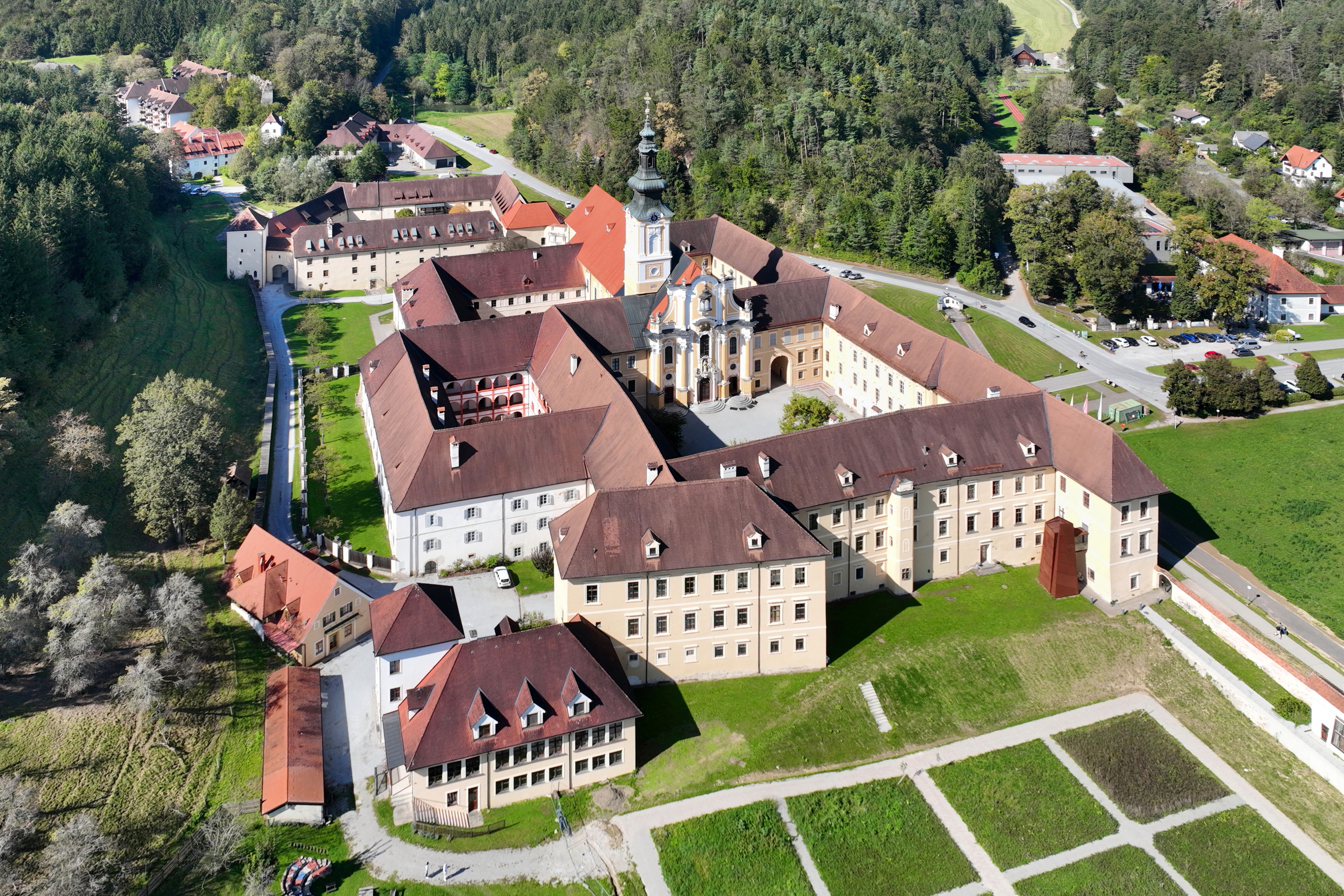
East-southeast view of Rein Abbey

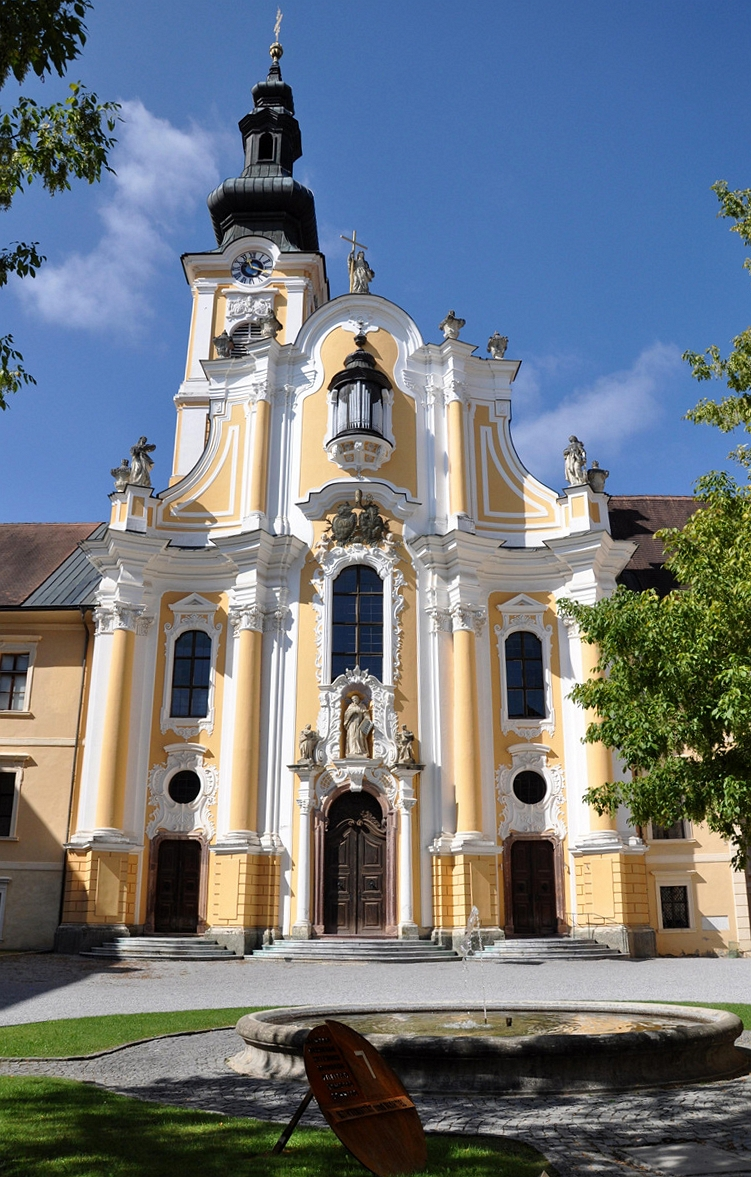
Rein Abbey, west front of the abbey church

Rein Abbey (German: Stift Rein) is a Cistercian monastery in Rein near Gratwein, Styria, in Austria. Also known as the "Cradle of Styria" ("Wiege der Steiermark"), it is the oldest surviving Cistercian community in the world.

== History ==
The monastery was founded in 1129 by Margrave Leopold the Strong of Styria and settled by monks from Ebrach Abbey in Bavaria under the first abbot, Gerlacus. It was the 38th Cistercian monastery to be founded. The previous 37 are all since dissolved, leaving Rein as the oldest extant Cistercian monastery in the world. The abbey has remained a Cistercian community ever since on the same site, except for the temporary exile of a few years during World War II when the premises were confiscated by the Nazis and the monks were evicted until they were able to return in 1945.

Rein was the mother house of Wilhering Abbey near Linz in 1146, and later of Stična Abbey and Neukloster Abbey.

On 19 September 1276 the abbey was the scene of the Rein Oath (German: Der Reiner Schwur), when the Styrian and Carinthian nobility pledged allegiance to Rudolf of Habsburg, King of the Romans, thus furthering the establishment of the Habsburgs as rulers of Austria and the end of the rule of King Ottokar II of Bohemia.

From 1950 to 1990 the community at Rein also accommodated the exiled Cistercians of Hohenfurt Abbey in the former Czechoslovakia, and during that time was known as Rein-Hohenfurt Abbey, until the Czech monks were eventually able to return to the reopened monastery in the present Czech Republic, now Vyšší Brod Abbey.

The abbey also accommodated overflow classes from a local Gymnasium from the 1950s to the 1970s, and lent part of its outbuildings for the use of the Institut für künstlerische Gestaltung, part of the Technische Universität Graz. As of 2014, the Monastery has lent part of its outbuildings to Bundesgymnasium Rein.

== Buildings ==
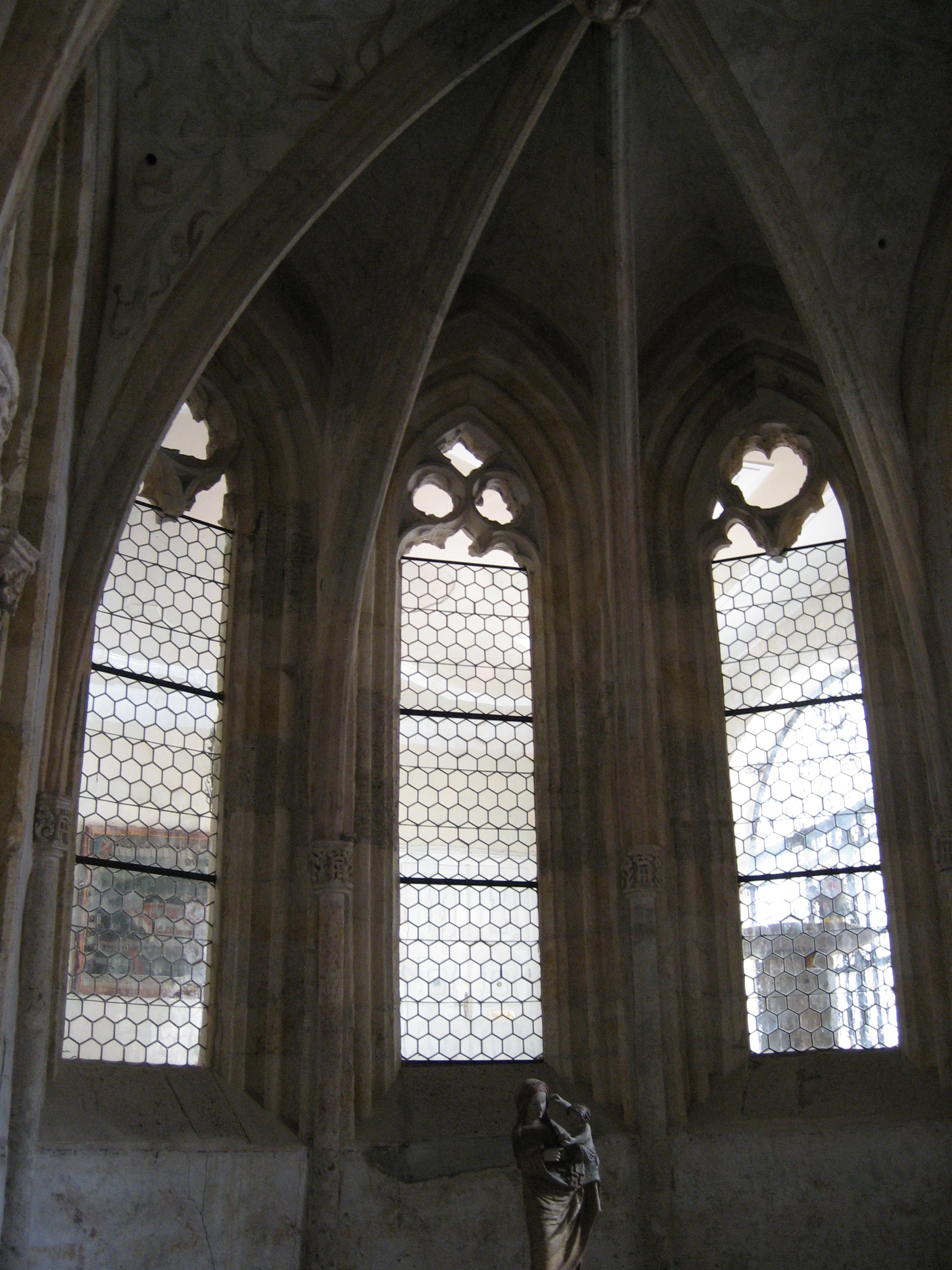
Gothic Chapel of the Cross window

The abbey church and conventual buildings are of Romanesque origin. At the beginning of the 17th century an upsurge in numbers required the expansion of the conventual buildings. The alterations, which involved the redevelopment of the old cloisters, were carried out between 1629 and 1632 by the architect Bartholomäus di Bosio, who constructed the Neues Konvent with its courtyard and Renaissance arcading.

Under Abbot Placidus Mailly (1710-1745) it was decided to refurbish the church in Baroque style. The work, by the court builder Johann Georg Stengg from Graz, was completed between 1738 and 1747. The frescoes, dating from 1766, were by Josef Adam von Mölk, and the painting on the high altar (of the Adoration of the Shepherds) of 1779, by Martin Johann Schmidt. Since 1786 the abbey church has also been the parish church. It was elevated to a basilica minor by Pope John Paul II in 1979.

The buildings were damaged by a great flood in 1975.

In the summer of 2006 during restoration work in the Baroque choir chapel archaeological excavations were carried out by a team from the University of Graz, and the foundations of the former Romanesque chapter house were discovered, as well as a number of graves, including that of the founder, Margrave Leopold I of Styria. The former Baroque sacristy was dedicated by the abbot as a Lady chapel on 4 February 2007, since when the abbey's oldest madonna has been placed here.

The Gothic Chapel of the Cross, built 1406–1409, commemorates Saint Eberhard of Salzburg, who died at Rein on 22 June 1164.

Other features of note include the abbots' gallery, containing portraits of all the abbots from 1129 onwards, St. Ulrich's church, the tomb of Margrave Ottakar III of Styria (son of the founder), and the monument of Ernest, Duke of Austria (d. 1424).

== Library ==
The abbey library, comprising more than 100,000 items, contains inter alia 390 manuscripts and 150 incunabula, of which the best known is a 13th-century fragment of Parzival.

== Community ==
In 2007 the community consisted of ten monks and the abbot, Petrus Steigenberger, who was the 56th abbot since the foundation. As of 2014 the community consists of sixteen monks and the abbot, Christian Feurstein, who is the 57th abbot since the foundation.

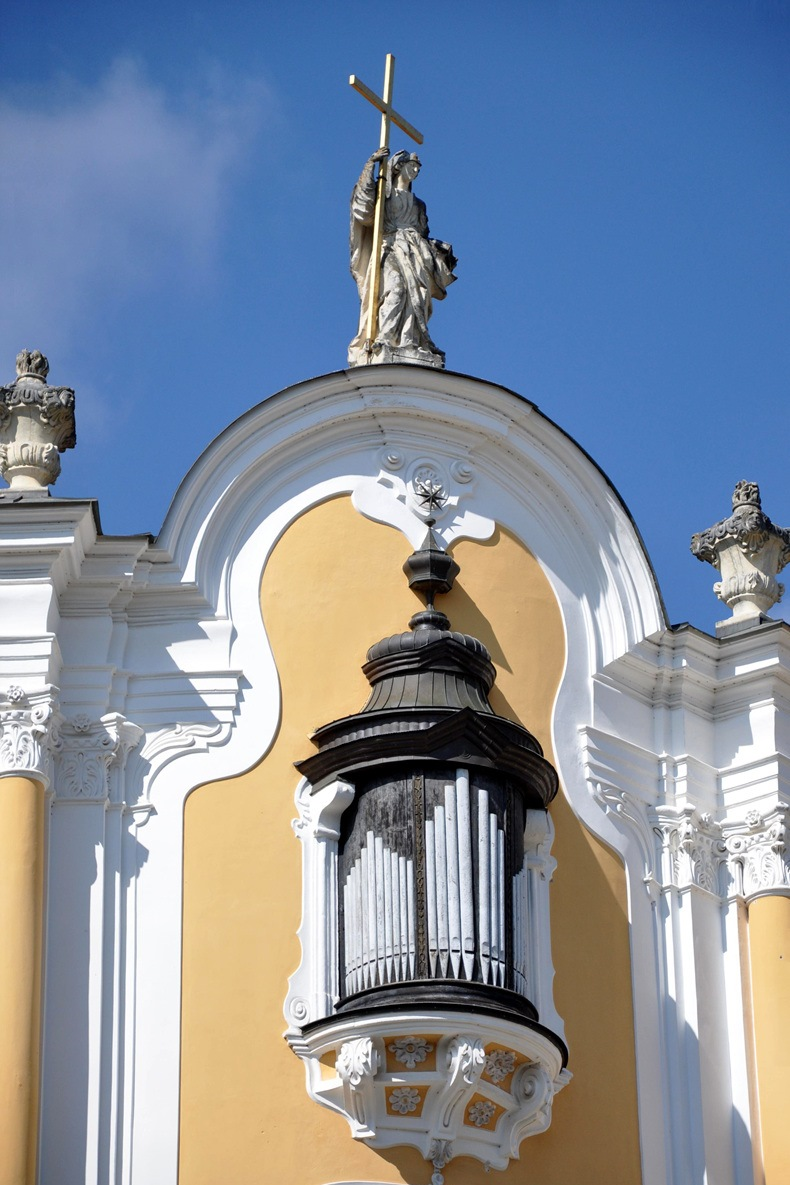
Abbey church

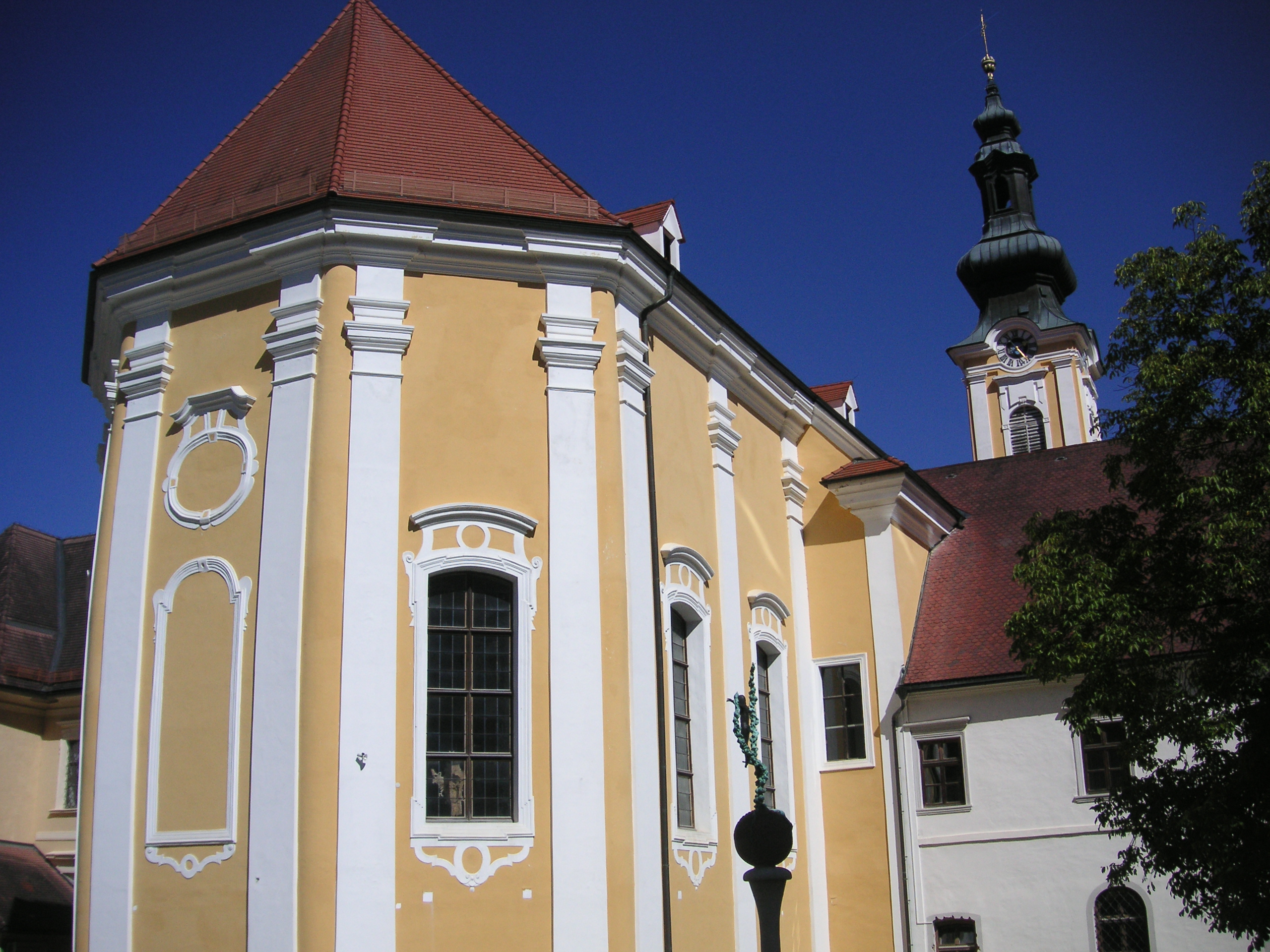
Abbey church western choir

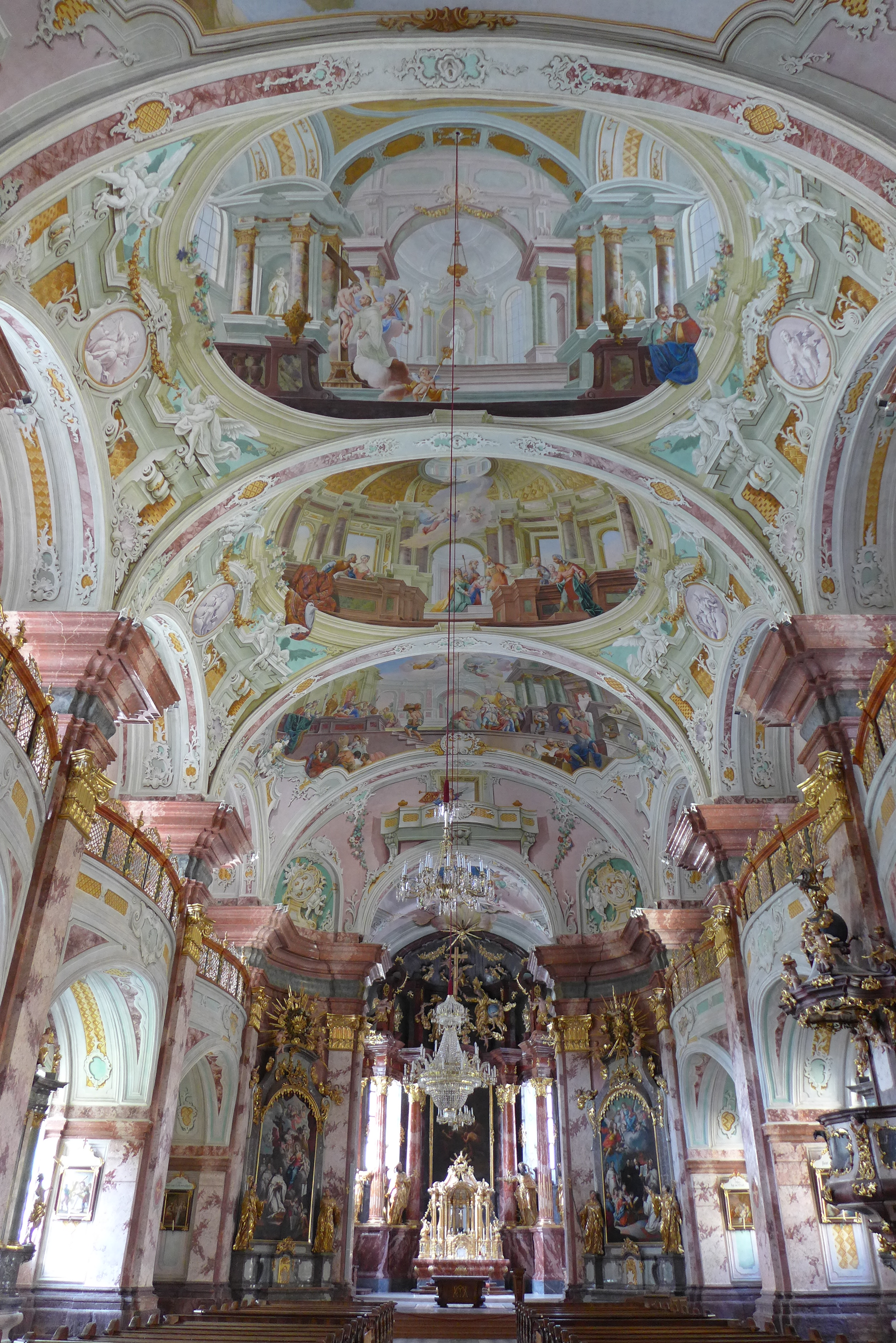
Abbey church interior

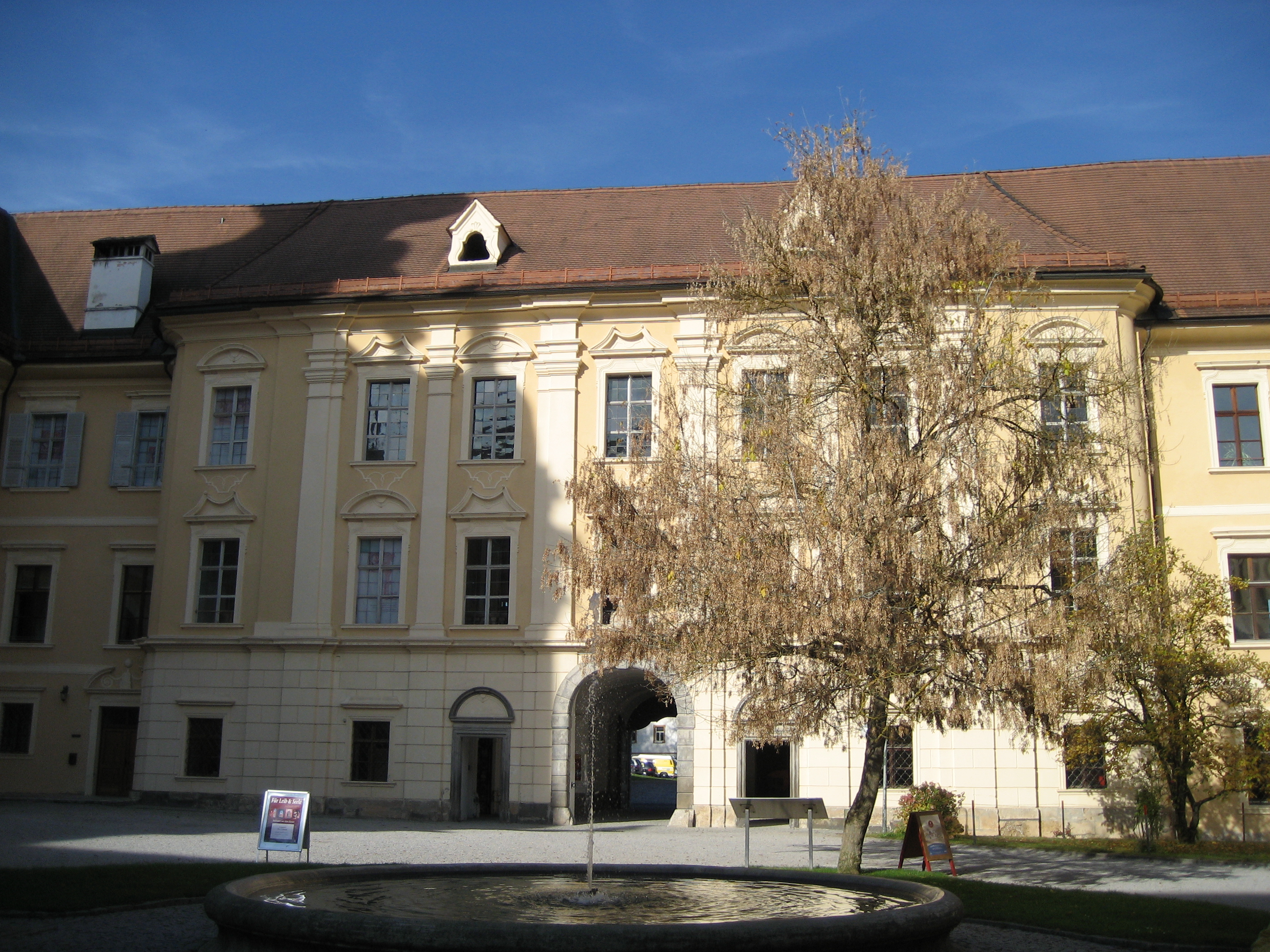
Abbey courtyard

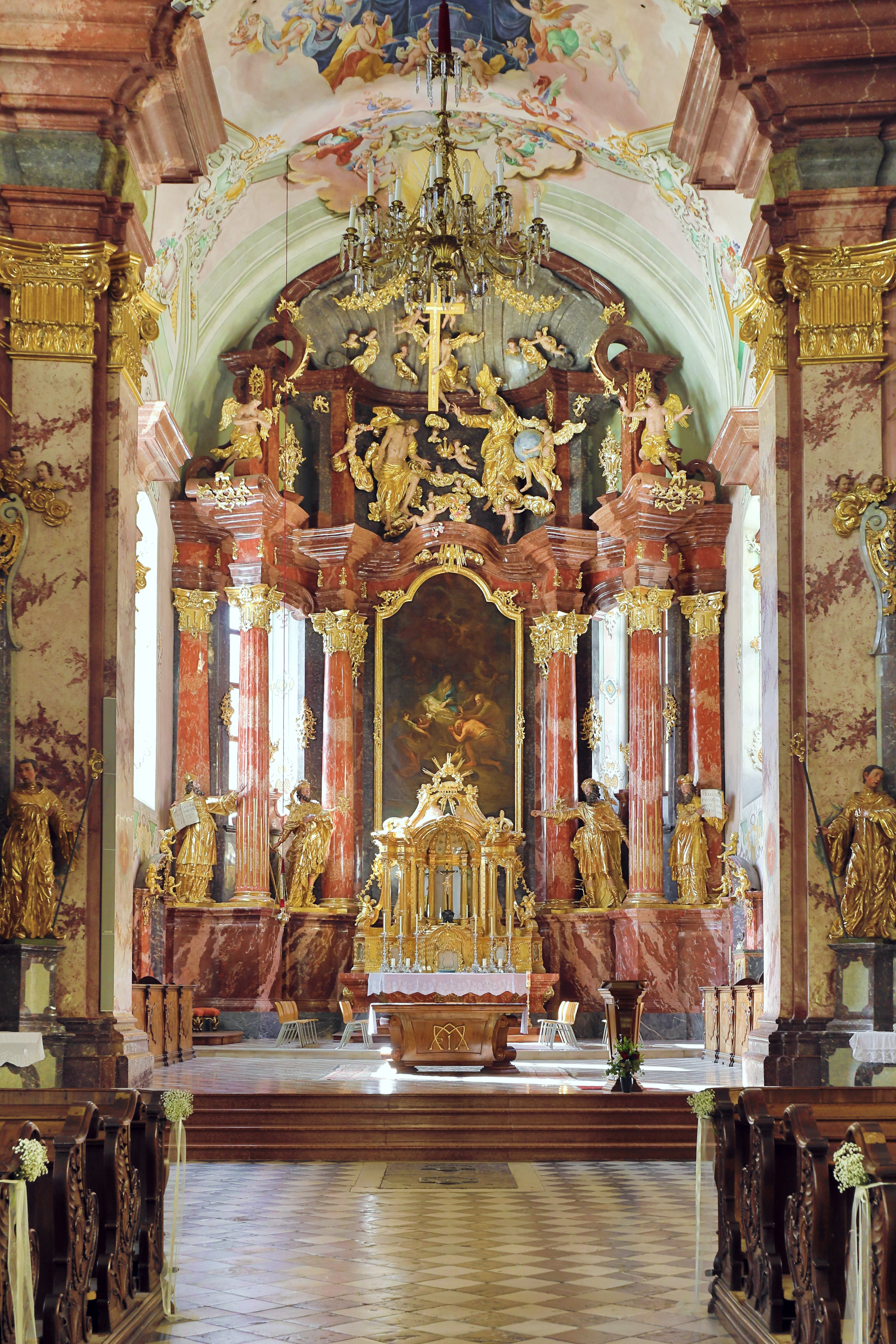
High altar

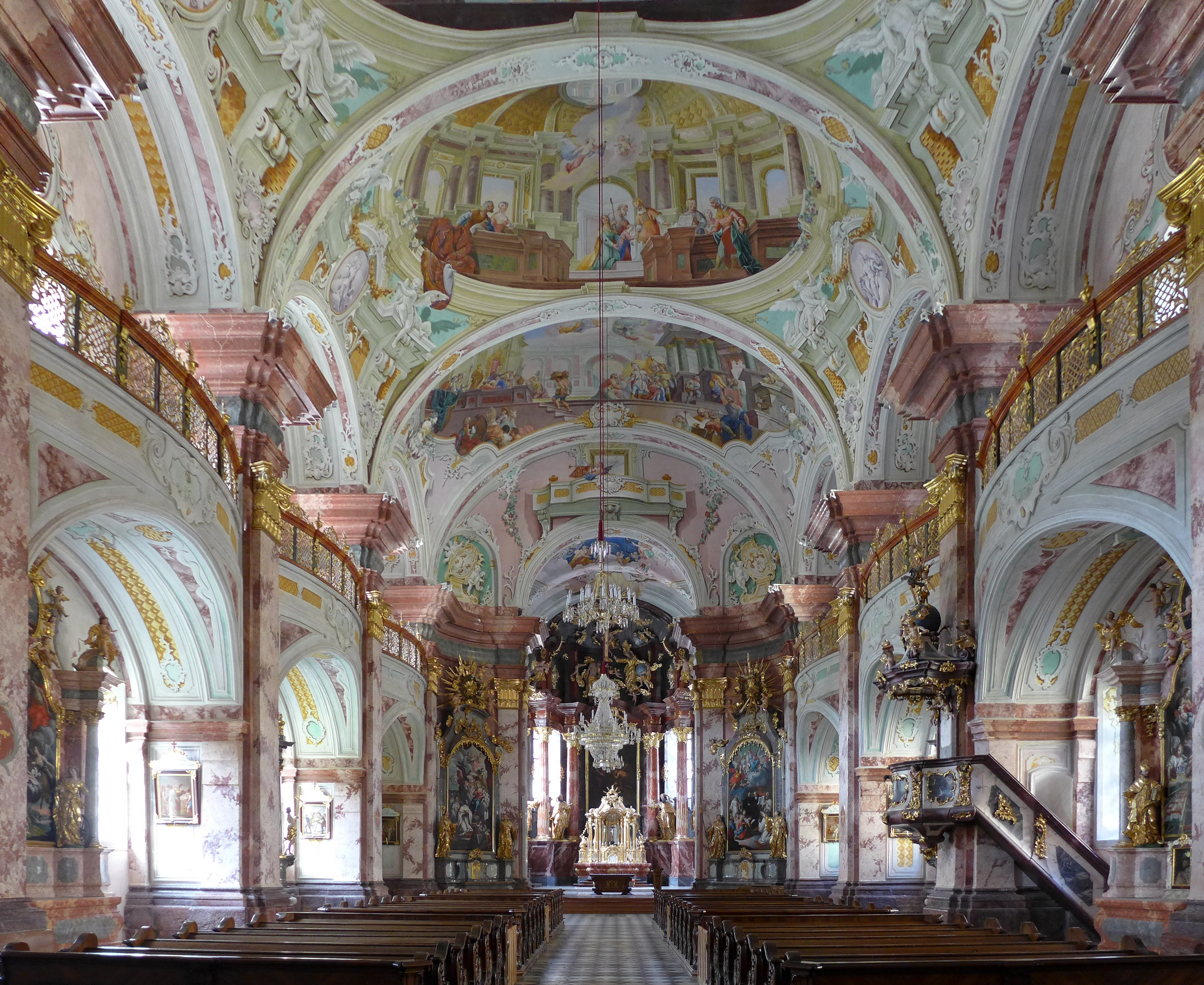
Basilica interior

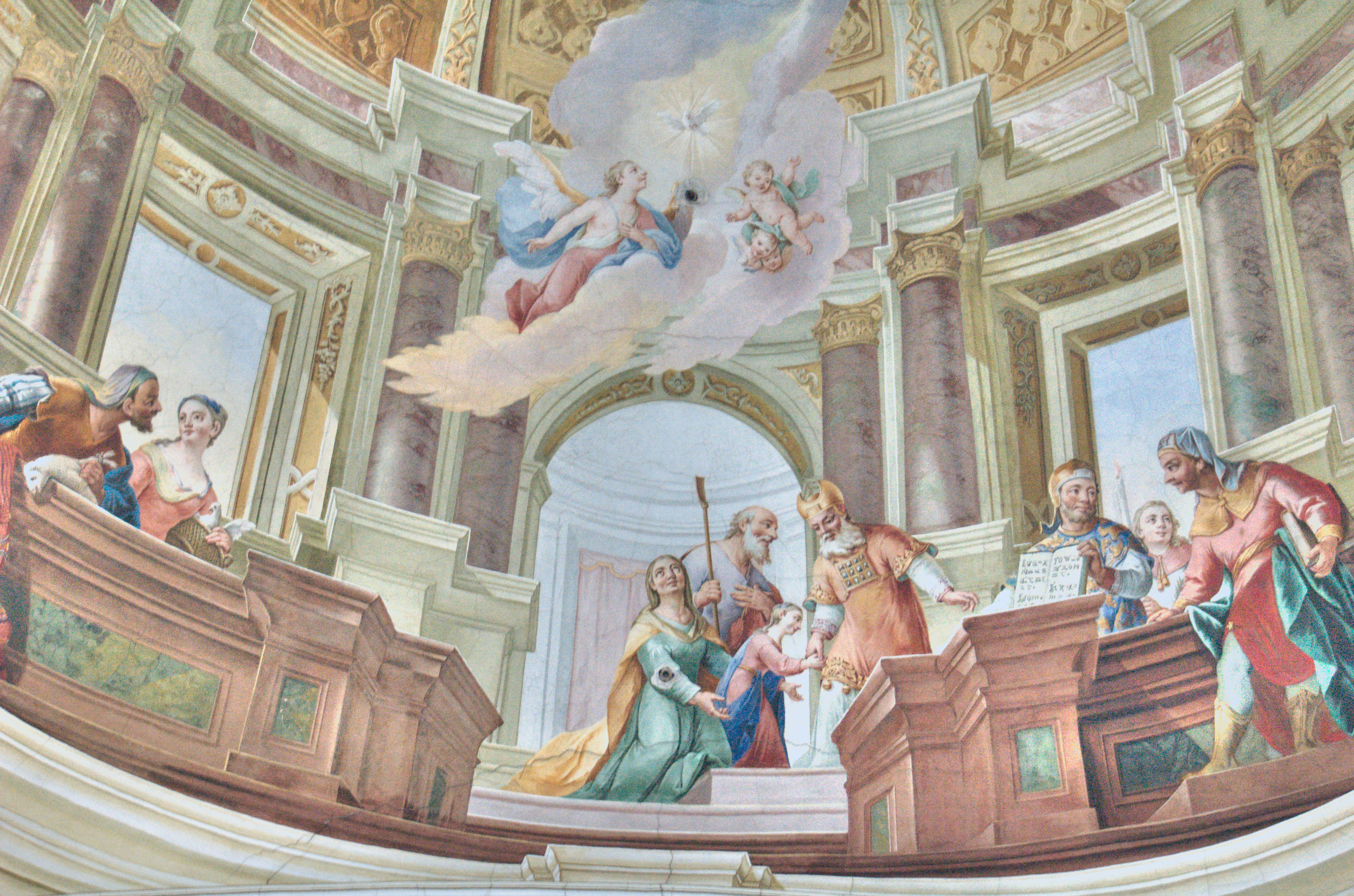
Ceiling painting

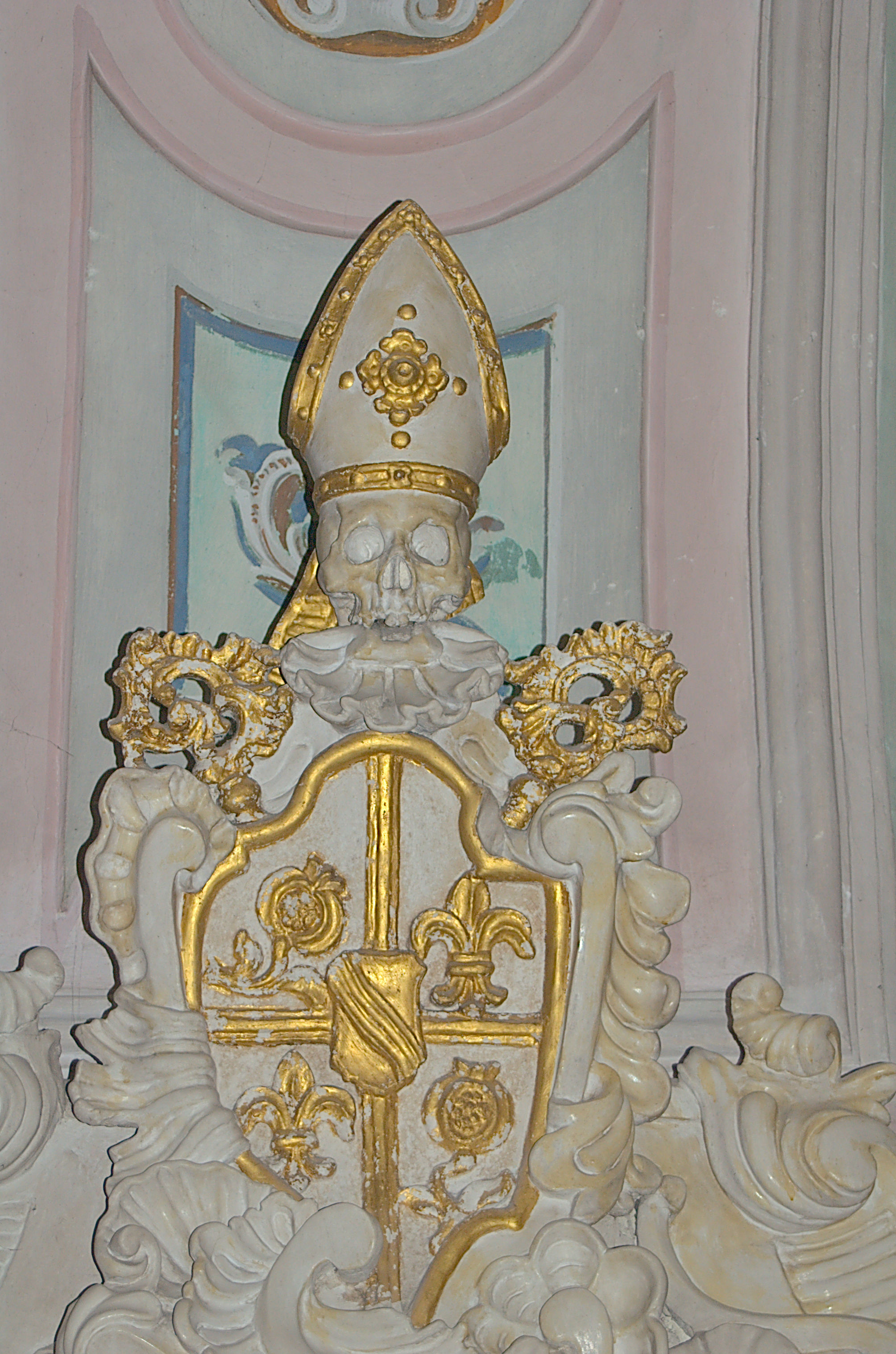
Arms and supporter on the arch over the gateway

== Sources and external links ==
- Stift Rein (in German)
- AEIOU entry (in German)
- University of Graz: Report on the Archaeological Investigations 2004-006
