= Berthold III of Zähringen =

Duke of Zähringen

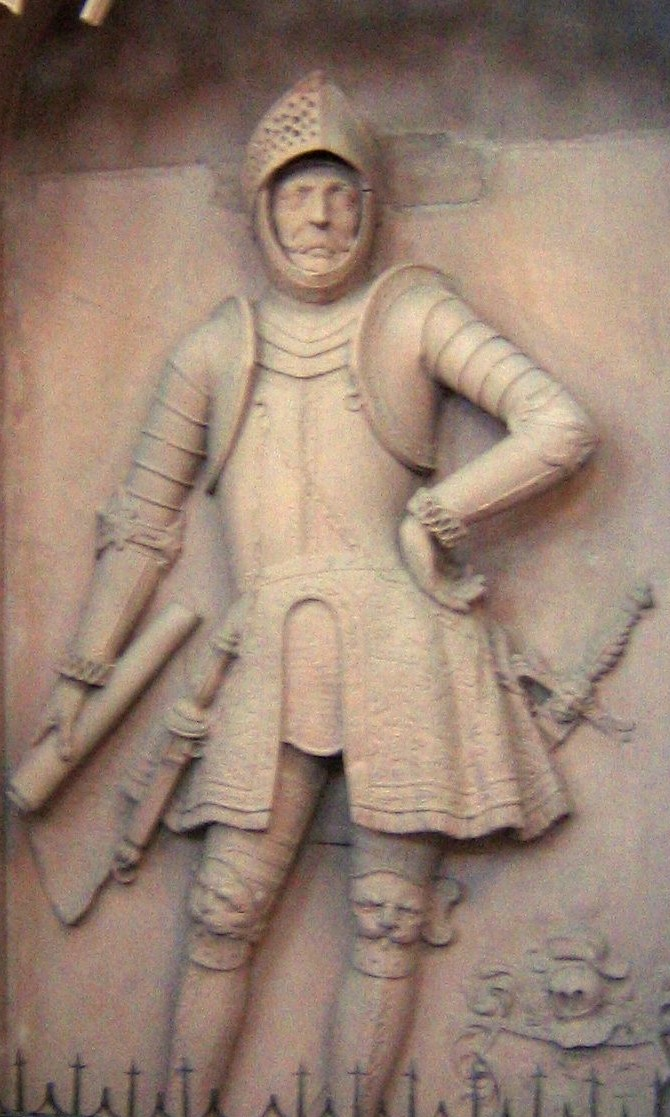
Relief sculpture of Berthold III in Freiburg Minster

Berthold III, Duke of Zähringen (c. 1085 – 3 December 1122) was the Duke of Zähringen from 1111 until his death in 1122. He was a son of Berthold II, the first holder of that ducal title.

Berthold III was a supporter of emperor Henry V and was significantly involved in the Concordat of Worms of 1122. He was married to Sophia of Bavaria, a daughter of Henry IX, Duke of Bavaria.

He was killed on 3 December 1122 near Molsheim in the course of a feud, and he was buried at St. Peter's Abbey in the village of St. Peter im Schwarzwald. Berthold III died without male issue and was succeeded by his younger brother, Conrad I.
