= Imperial cathedrals =

Cathedral linked to the German emperors

Imperial cathedral (German: Kaiserdom) is the designation for a cathedral or an important church linked to the Imperial rule of the Holy Roman Empire. Dom (as the Italian Duomo) denotes the main church of a town or a city, which may not be a cathedral.

== Rhenish cathedrals ==
The three Romanesque cathedrals of Mainz, Worms and Speyer in the northwestern Upper Rhine area are called Rhenish imperial cathedrals.

The construction of Mainz Cathedral was begun about 975 under Archbishop Willigis, then regent of the Holy Roman Empire for minor King Otto III. His seat was already meant as a kind of "state church", it was the first building of this size north of the Alps. The cathedral was completed in 1009, burnt down at the dedication, and was immediately rebuilt. Willigis may have planned to replace Aachen Cathedral as coronation church of the King of the Romans; indeed Otto's III successors Henry II (in 1002) and Conrad II (in 1024) were crowned in Mainz, but both presumably in the preceding building, since the present cathedral was not consecrated until in 1038. King Henry IV also contributed to the building after another blaze in 1081. Mainz Cathedral was the coronation site for Philip of Swabia, for Frederick II, and anti-king Henry Raspe.

Speyer Cathedral is the world's largest preserved Romanesque church (after the demolition of Cluny Abbey) and today a UNESCO World Heritage Site. It was built starting about 1025 by King Conrad II as a family vault for the ruling Salian dynasty. His successor Henry III donated the Speyer Gospels in 1046; the building was completed in 1061 under the rule of King Henry IV. During the Investiture Controversy with Pope Gregory VIII, he had the church again extended from 1081, in order to stress his Imperial authority. His mortal remains were transferred to the cathedral by his son Henry V in 1111.

Worms Cathedral, a highrising building, was built from about 1130 to 1181. It houses the tombs of Emperor Conrad's II family and also got its status because of its size and glory. The church was the site of the nomination of Pope Leo IX in 1048 and of the conclusion of the 1122 Concordat of Worms ending the Investiture Controversy. In 1235 the marriage of Emperor Frederick II with Isabella of England took place here.

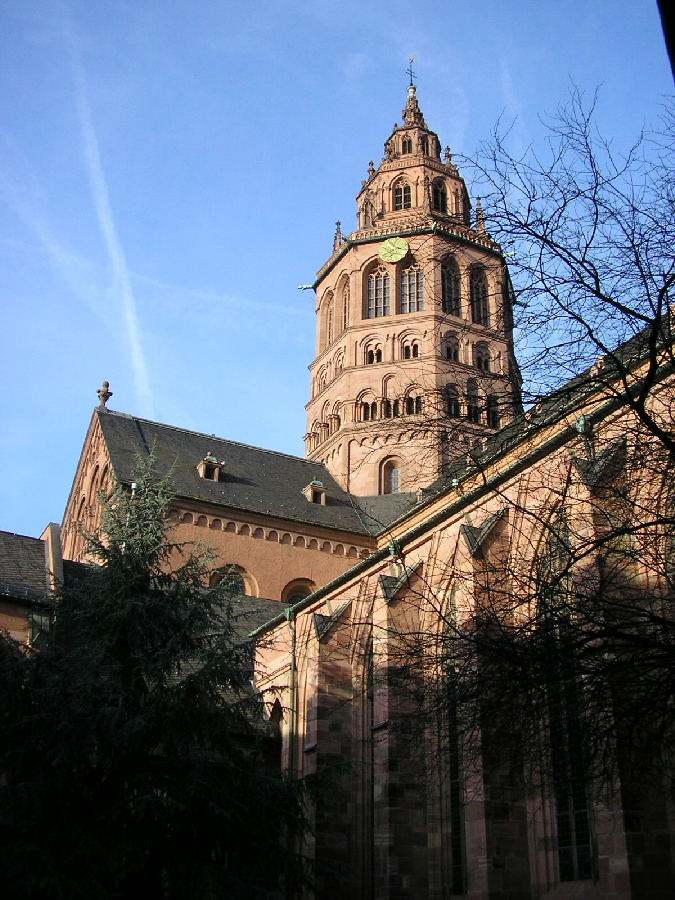
Mainz Cathedral

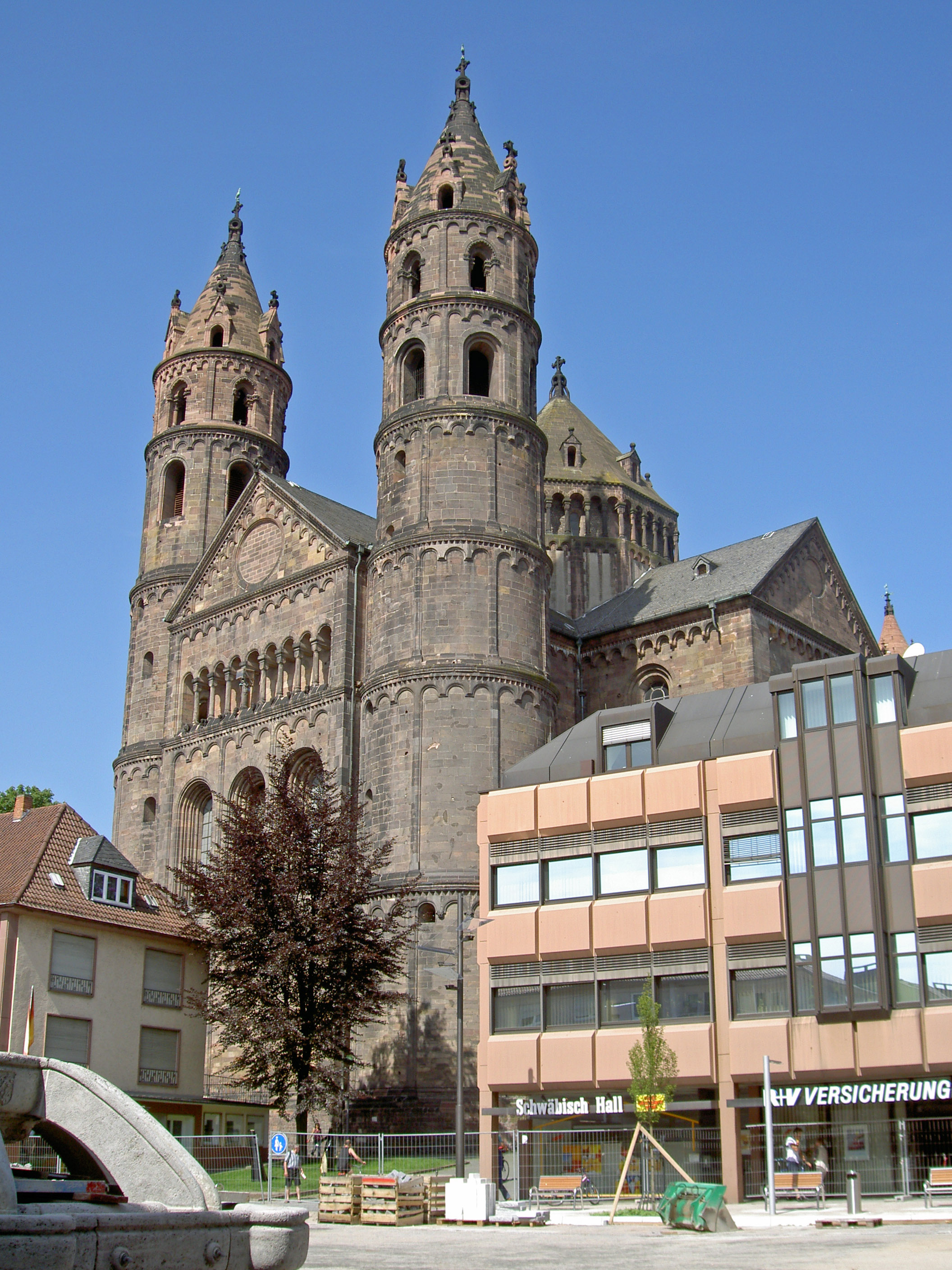
Worms Cathedral

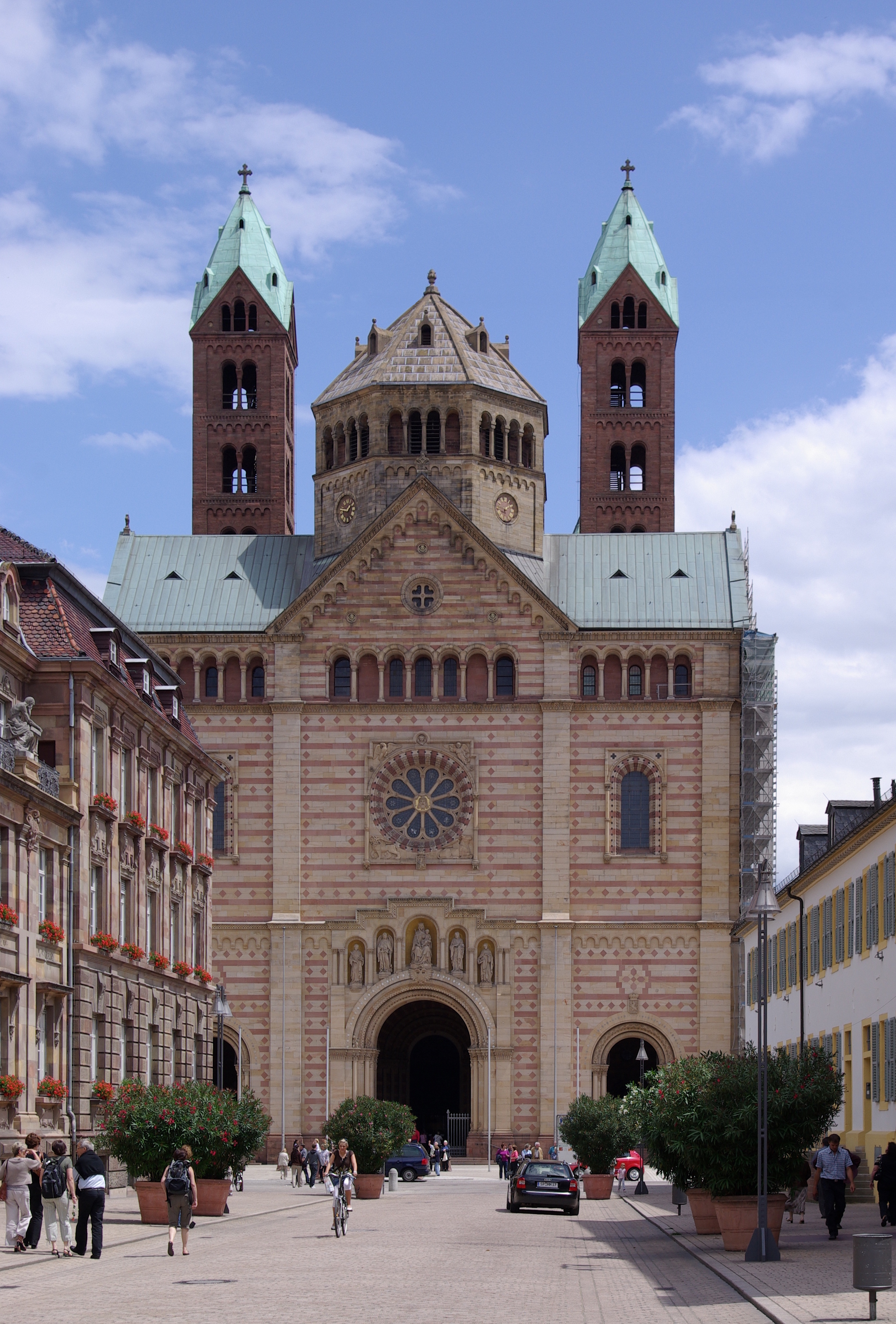
Speyer Cathedral

== Carolingian foundations ==
Aachen Cathedral, a UNESCO World Heritage Site since 1978, today is the seat of the Bishops of Aachen and the city's landmark. Its central octagon was erected from the late 8th century onwards as the chapel of the Palace of Aachen, a residence of Emperor Charlemagne. The building, a masterpiece of the Carolingian Renaissance, has been expanded several times over the centuries; from 936 it served as the coronation church of the Kings of the Romans after their election at Frankfurt. Nevertheless, the former Palatine Chapel did not attain the rank of a cathedral until 1802, permanently in 1930.

Frankfurt Cathedral (St Bartholomew Church) is also described as an imperial cathedral, though it never had been a bishop's seat. The present Gothic building replaced a Carolingian palatine chapel, erected at the Frankfurt royal palace (Königpfalz). It was rebuilt as a basilica and collegiate church consecrated by Archbishop Rabanus Maurus in 852. Frankfurt first became the site of the election of the German monarch with the accession of Frederick Barbarossa in 1152, definitely fixed in the Golden Bull of 1356. From 1562 until 1792, Frankfurt was also the site of the Imperial coronation ceremony led by the Archbishop of Mainz.

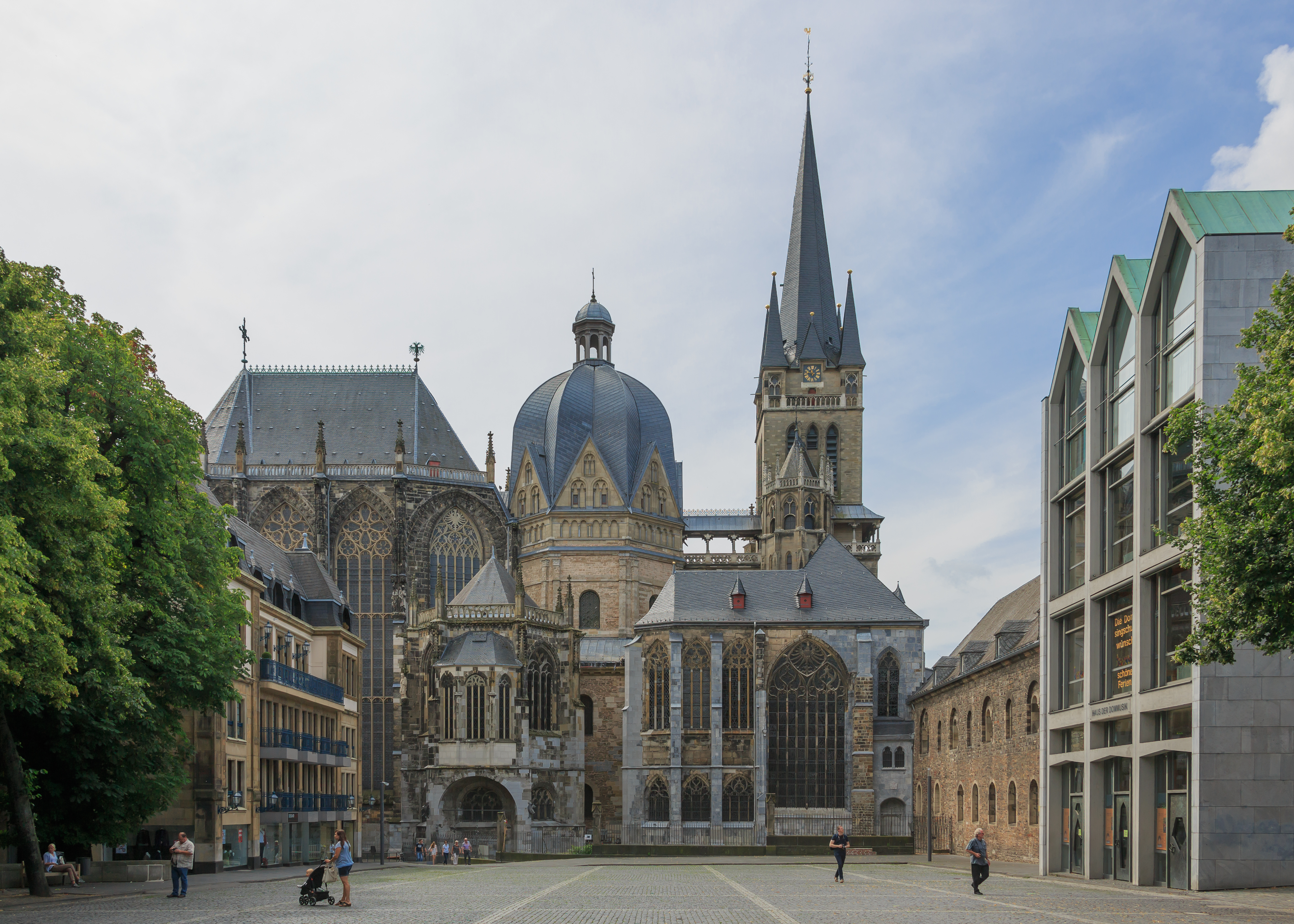
Aachen Cathedral

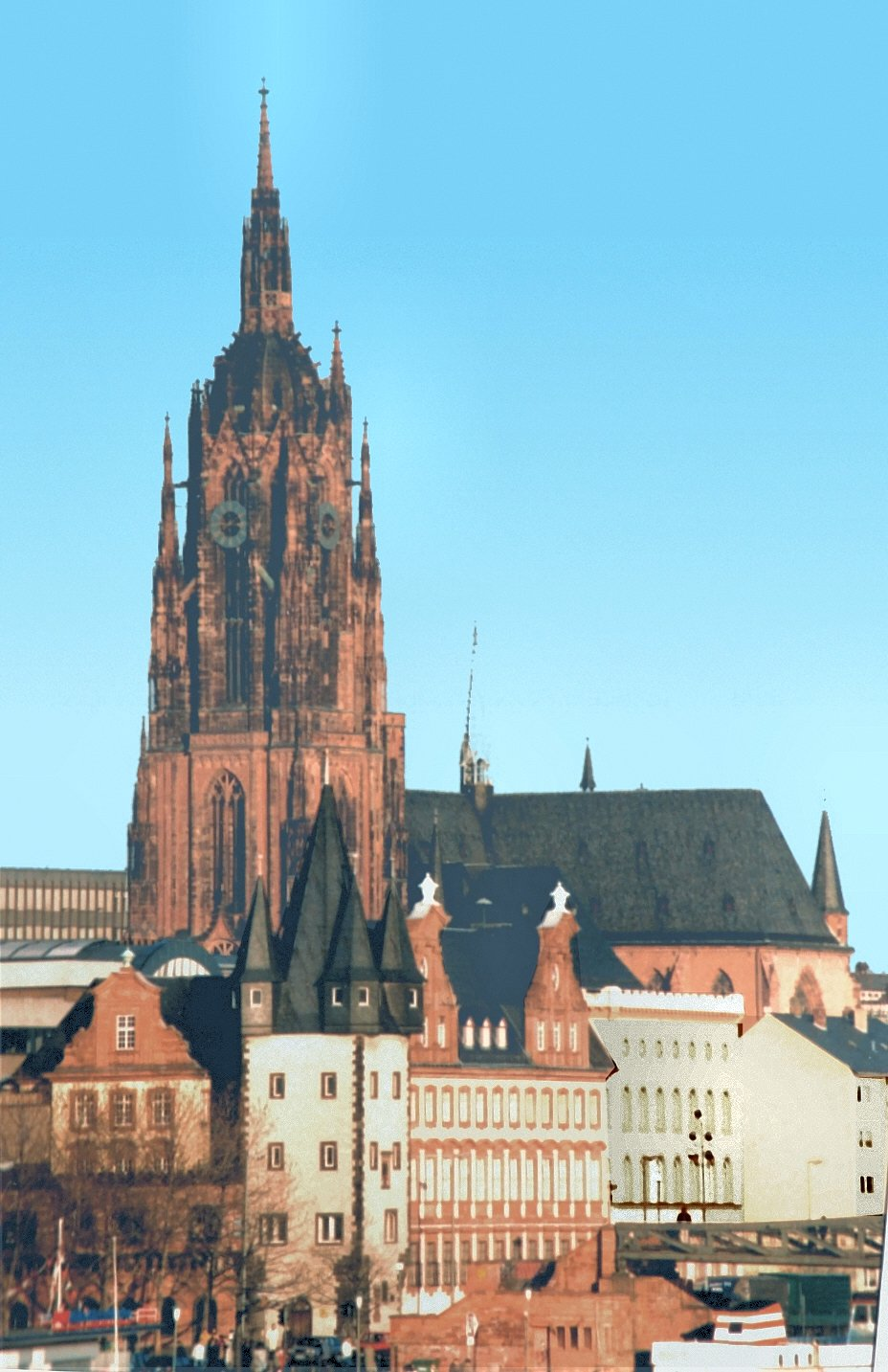
Frankfurt Cathedral

== Other ==
Bamberg Cathedral with its four towers also has the same status. Built from 1004 onwards for the newly established Bishopric of Bamberg at the behest of the last Ottonian King Henry II and his wife Cunigunde of Luxembourg, the church is the site where the only canonized imperial couple has their grave. In 1046 Bishop Suidger of Bamberg was elected Pope Clement II; his grave at the cathedral is the only tomb of a Pope north of the Alps. The Romanesque building, also known for the Bamberg Horseman, is part of the historic Town of Bamberg and today also listed as a World Heritage Site.

Less well known is that the imperial burial church in the small town of Königslutter, a basilica built from 1135 as a Benedictine abbey church and family vault of the Supplinburger dynasty in the Saxon lands of Emperor Lothair II. The church was completed about 1170, more than 30 years after Lothair's death, by the Welf duke Henry the Lion at the time when the Imperial rule had already passed to the Swabian house of Hohenstaufen.

Magdeburg Cathedral, see of the Archbishopric of Magdeburg founded by Emperor Otto the Great in 968, as well as Palermo Cathedral (Maria Santissima Assunta) it represents the imperial mausoleum of the Hohenstaufen family (with the sarcophagi of the Hohenstaufen emperors Henry VI and Frederick II, of the relatives and of the empresses) therefore they are imperial cathedrals.

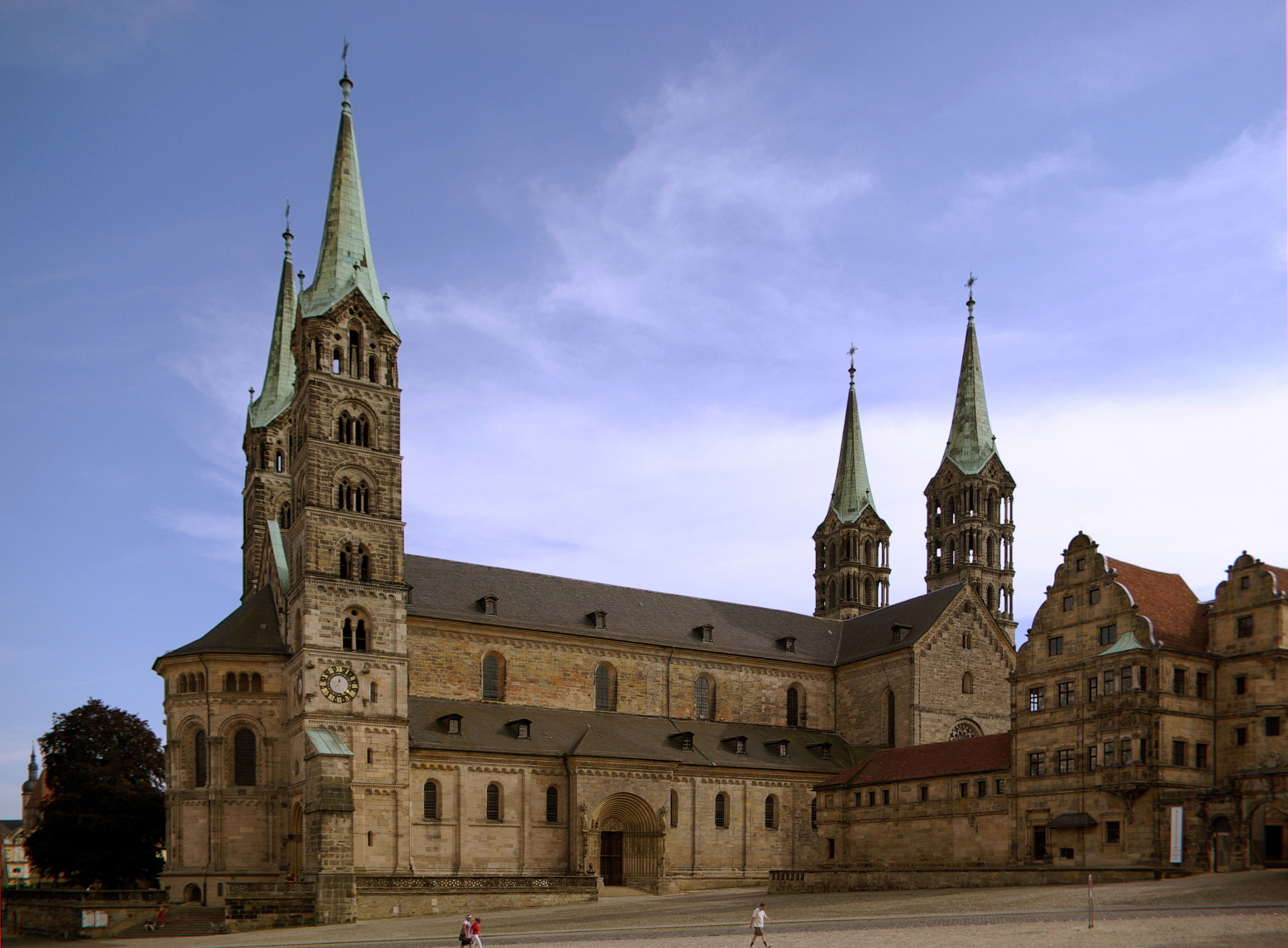
Bamberg Cathedral

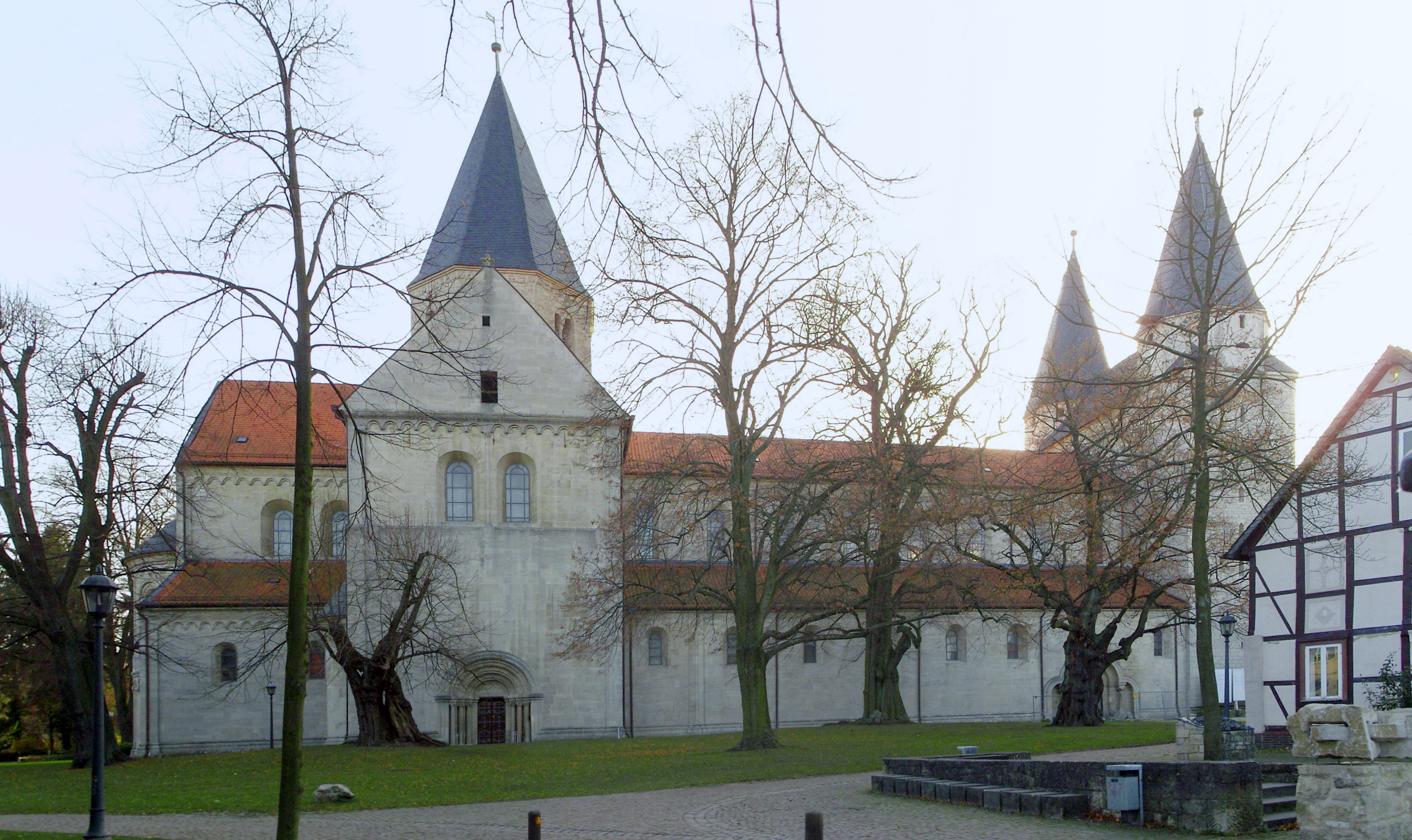
Königslutter Cathedral

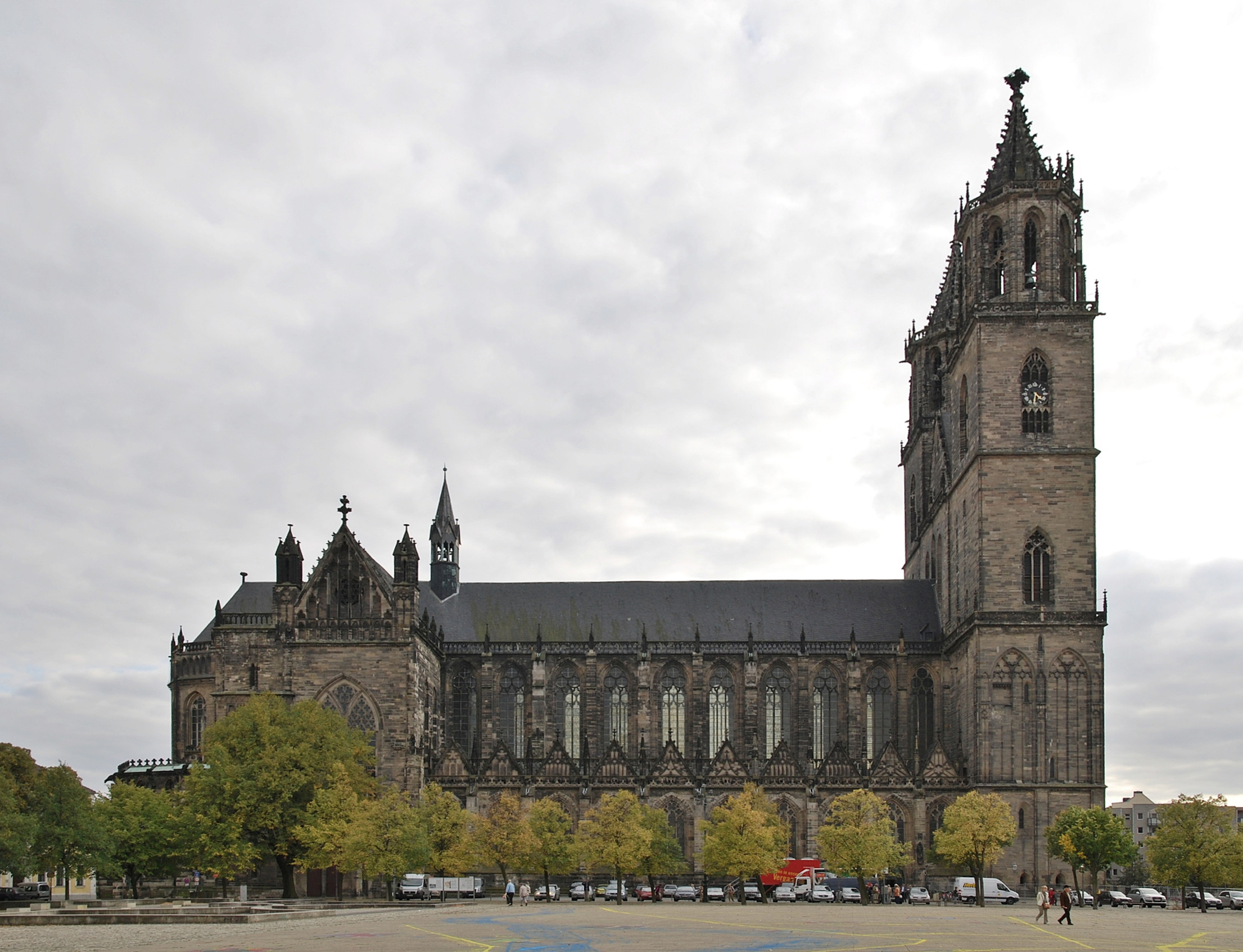
Magdeburg Cathedral

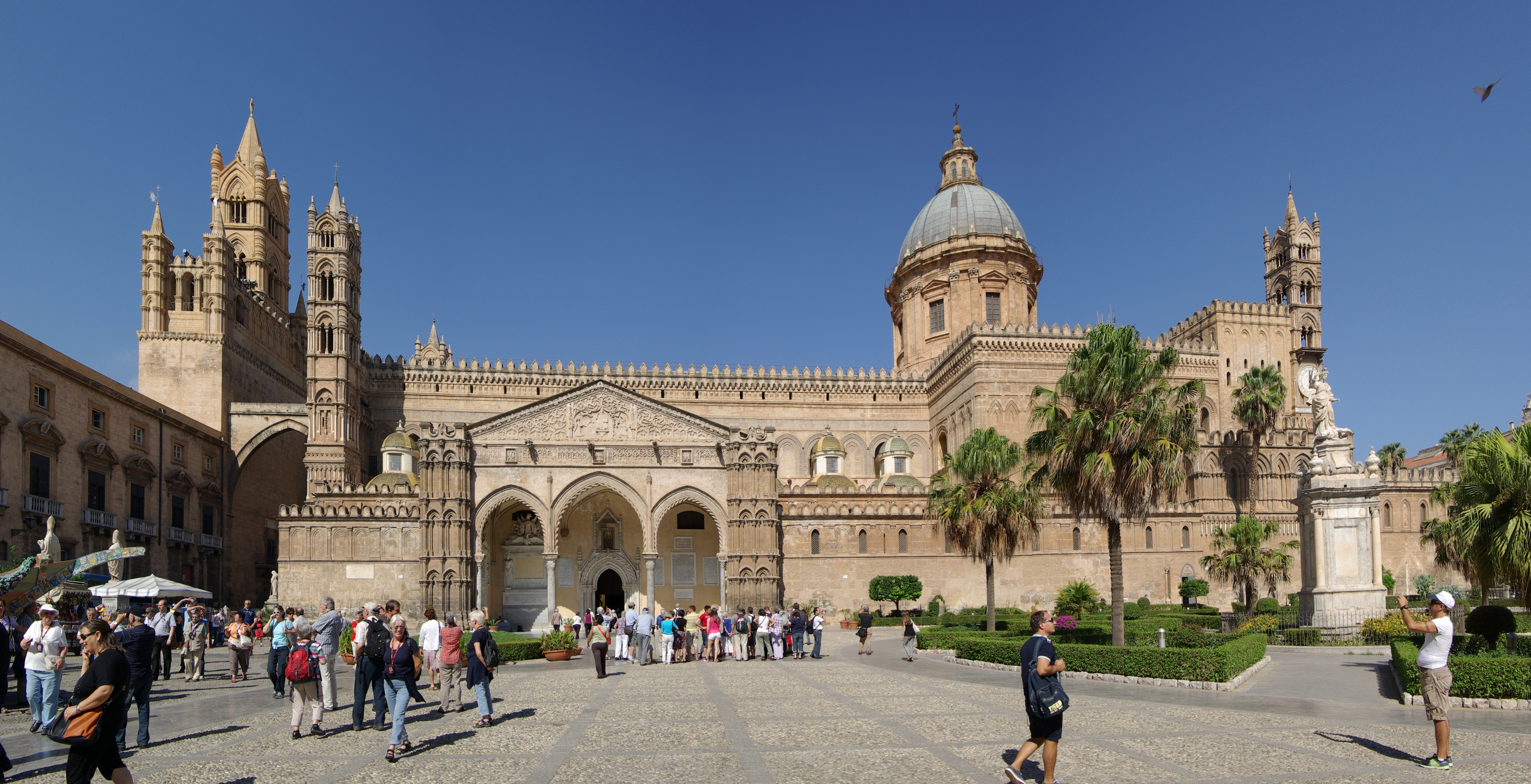
Palermo Cathedral
