= Conrad of Bavaria =

Cistercian monk (c. 1105–1126/54)

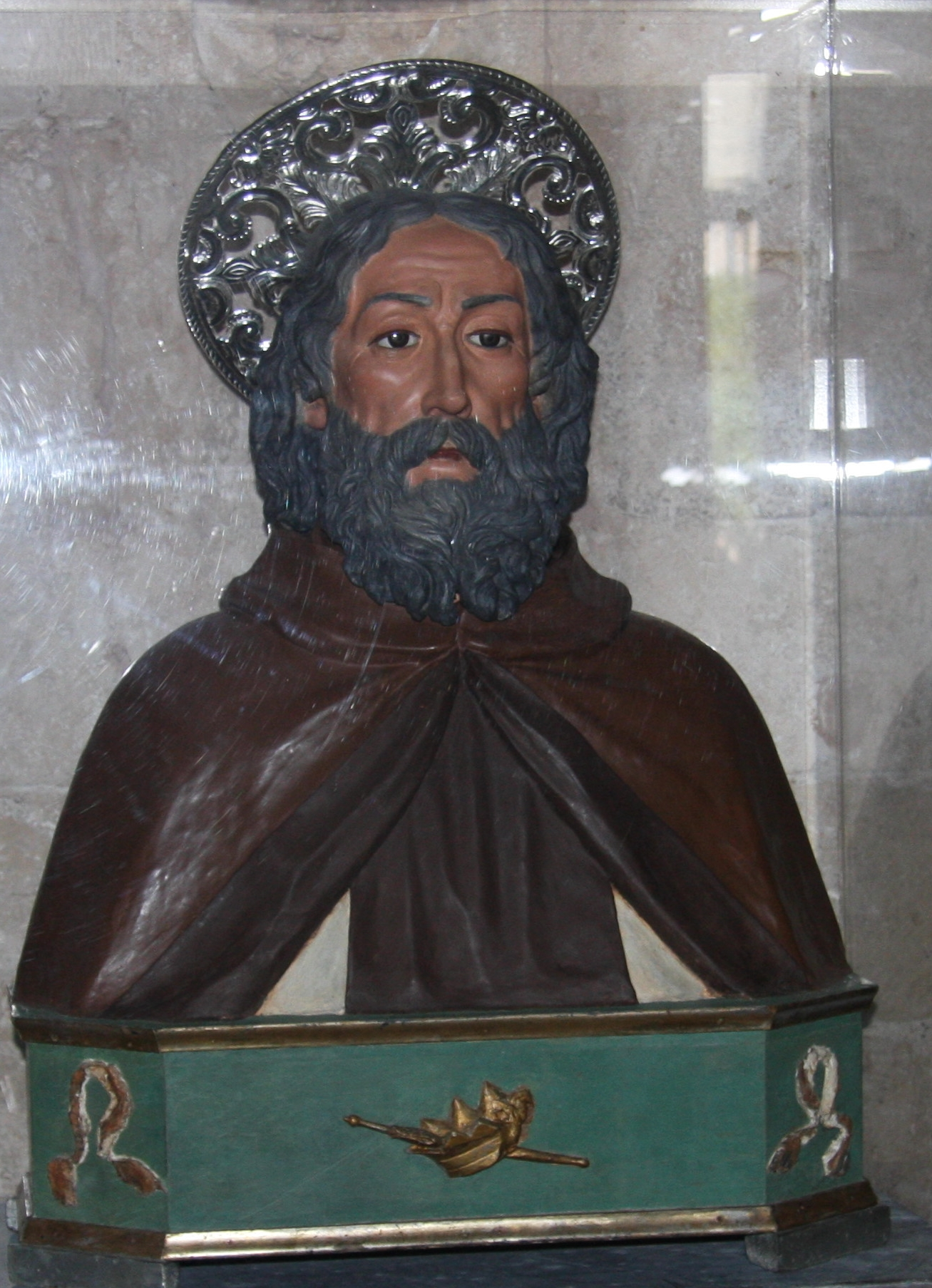
Bust of Conrad of Bavaria in Molfetta Cathedral

Conrad of Bavaria (German: Konrad von Bayern; Italian: Corrado di Baviera) (c. 1105 – 17 March 1126 or 1154) was a Cistercian monk, the son of Henry the Black, Duke of Bavaria and Wulfhilde Billung of Saxony. The former Molfetta Cathedral, now renamed church of Saint Conrad of Bavaria, is dedicated to him, and he is also the patron saint of Molfetta, although formally speaking he was beatified rather than canonised.

== Life ==
There are several different versions of the life of Conrad. The common elements are that he was born in the castle of Ravensburg in Swabia (or Regensburg in Bavaria), a younger son of Henry IX, Duke of Bavaria, a member of the Italian Welf-Este family. Through the marriage of his sister Judith he was the uncle of Frederick Barbarossa. (He is sometimes named as Henry's second son, sometimes as the third, sometimes as the youngest). After some time spent with the monks of Weingarten Abbey, a Welf family monastery, he studied theology in Cologne under the protection of his relative, the Archbishop Frederick I, with the intention, on the part of his family, that he should eventually succeed to the archbishopric. While at Cologne however he became a disciple of Bernard of Clairvaux and entered the Cistercian Order, taking his vows at Clairvaux and joining the community there as a monk.

He then journeyed, or intended to journey, to the Holy Land (although not as a part of the crusades) with the purpose of living there as a hermit, but either never left Europe or was obliged to return to it. Passing through Apulia (in whichever direction) he stopped at Modugno near Bari, where he lived as a hermit either in a cave near the grotto of the sanctuary or in a small Benedictine abbey nearby, where he died.

According to sources which favour a death in 1126, he was drawn to the Cistercians by the preaching in Cologne of Arnold the German, abbot of Morimond, rather than of Bernard himself, and took his vows at Morimond rather than at Clairvaux, although the latter is often given. His journey to the Holy Land was in the context of Arnold's endeavour to establish a Cistercian monastery there, which incurred the disapproval of Saint Bernard, who tried to prevent it. In the event Arnold died, in 1125, which put an end to it. Conrad nevertheless continued alone, hoping to become a hermit in the Holy Land, but when he reached Apulia, instead of embarking, he settled in a cave near the grotto shrine of Santa Maria ad Cryptam (as above), living, praying and sleeping on bare rock, and before he died in 1126, had gained a local following by virtue of his holiness of life.

Those in favour of a death in 1154 (or 1155) add extra years spent either as a monk at Clairvaux or as a hermit either in the Holy Land or by the grotto at Modugno. According to some, Conrad accompanied King Conrad to the Holy Land in 1147 on the Second Crusade, returning in the same year but after some time in Clairvaux travelled back to the Holy Land in 1151 with Bernard's permission to live as a hermit; his return to Europe is dated to 1153, caused by the news that Bernard had fallen ill.

His relics were preserved in the old Molfetta Cathedral, which was dedicated to him and is still in existence as the Church of San Corrado. They were translated to the new cathedral after its restoration in 1785.

His local cultus was confirmed on 7 April 1832 by his beatification by Pope Gregory XVI. Nevertheless, he is commonly referred to as a saint. In the Cistercian Order his feast is celebrated on 9 February.

The feast of San Corrado is celebrated annually in Molfetta by a procession that carries the skull of the saint in a silver reliquary round the town.

== Sources ==
- Walter Troxler (1992): "Konrad von Bayern". In Bautz, Traugott. Biographisch-Bibliographisches Kirchenlexikon (BBKL) 4. Herzberg: Bautz. cols. 384–385. ISBN 3-88309-038-7 (in German)
- P. Adolf Dietrich: Der selige Konrad von Bayern. In: Cistercienser-Chronik XXVI 1914, pp. 33–41, 68 -78, 104-109
- Giuseppe Maria Giovene (1836). Vita Beati Conradi Bavari (in Latin). Naples.
- Giuseppe Maria Giovene (1839). Vita del Beato Corrado Bavaro (in Italian). Translated by Vito Fornari. Naples: Tipografia Carrozzieri a Montoliveto n. 13.
