= List of oldest heraldry =

Heraldry developed in the High Middle Ages based on earlier traditions of visual identification by means of seals, field signs, emblems used on coins, etc. Notably, lions that would subsequently appear in 12th-century coats of arms of European nobility have pre-figurations in the animal style of ancient art (specifically the style of Scythian art as it developed from c. the 7th century BC).

The origin of the term heraldry itself (Middle English heraldy, Old French hiraudie) can be placed in the context of the early forms of the knightly tournaments in the 12th century. Combatants wore full armour, and identified themselves by wearing their emblems on their shields. A herald (Old French heraut, from a Frankish *hariwald "commander of an army") was an officer who would announce the competitors. The display of heraldic emblems on shields is an innovation of the 12th century. The kite shields shown in the Bayeux Tapestry (c. 1070) sometimes show simple cross or spiral ornaments, but no heraldic emblems. Similarly, Frankish or German round shields of the 11th century (Ottonian, Salian) are sometimes depicted with simple geometric ornamentation, but not with figurative emblems. Early mention of heraldic shields in Middle High German literature likewise dates to the 12th century.

In some cases, the adoption of a symbol on a coat of arms was the culmination of a gradual progression, whereby a family can be seen using a symbol in a quasi-heraldic manner prior to its adoption as part of a formal coat. An example of this are the Counts of Saint-Pol, who between 1083 and 1130 decorated their coins with wheat sheafs that are then found on the equestrian seal of Count Engueraud (1141–50) placed in the blank space surrounding the mounted knight, before appearing on the shield of count Anselm and his successors from 1162. Similarly, the fleur-de-lis progressed from use as a decorative emblem by Henry I of France (1031–60) to then be displayed as a quasi-heraldic symbol by Louis VI, Louis VII, and Philip II (1180–1223) before becoming the charge of the French royal arms under the last of these kings. Lions were used as heraldic emblems by Henry "the Lion" (before 1146), and Alfonso VII of León (d. 1157), and probably by Henry I of England (d. 1135), in the first half of the 12th century, and lions later appear on the coats of arms of their respective realms.

The oldest surviving heraldic seals are the equestrian seals (German: Reitersiegel) used by high nobility in the second half of the 12th century. Among the oldest examples from the Holy Roman Empire, of what would develop into German heraldry, is the lion (or "leopard") of the Staufer coat of arms, first used before 1146 by Henry "the Lion", and in 1181 on the seal of Frederick VI of Swabia. Similar seals are known from England, one of the oldest being the equestrian seal of King Richard Lionheart of the House of Plantagenet, dated 1189, showing a heraldic lion design on the king's shield. His second seal, dated 1198, shows the three lions design which would subsequently become the royal coat of arms of England.

The earliest known colored heraldic representation appears on the funerary enamel of Geoffrey of Anjou (d. 1151), showing a coat of arms that appears to be the same as one later used by some of his descendants. Depiction of heraldic shields in manuscript miniatures becomes more common in the early-to-mid 13th century, and dedicated armorials become fashionable in the mid-to-late 13th century.

Year	Contemporary depiction	Modern interpretation	Attribution
1135			Ralph I, Count of Vermandois: A gonfanon is found on an equestrian seal dated to 1135 that depicts a chequy pattern, though the shield face is not visible in the seal and so there is no evidence that Ralph himself bore arms. This seal is of note only because the direct descendants of Ralph I would later adopt for arms Chequy Or and azure; the descendants of his nephew Waleran de Beaumont, 1st Earl of Worcester would adopt Chequy Or and gules.
1138			Waleran de Beaumont, 1st Earl of Worcester: The earliest known armorial seal in England or Normandy is attributed to Waleran de Beaumont, 1st Earl of Worcester. The seal dates to 1138, in which Worcester bears arms chequy. The descendants of Worcester would adopt for arms Chequy Or and gules. Worcester's brother and their descendants bear Chequy Or and azure. Worcester is the nephew of Ralph I, Count of Vermandois that bears Chequy Or and azure.
1138			Theobald II, Count of Champagne: An equestrian seal depicts what could be interpreted as an escarbuncle, however, the seal may simply be depicting braces that were commonly added to shields for reinforcement. Such braces are believed to be the origin of the heraldic escarbuncle.
1138–1161			Robert III de Vitré: An equestrian seal showing a shield with a sixteen-armed escarbuncle, but this may be a depiction of braces rather than a heraldic device.
1141			Enguerrand de Campdavaine, Count of Saint-Pol: In a seal dated to 1141, Saint-Pol can be seen on horseback surrounded by several garbs of wheat. The descendants of Saint-Pol would later adopt Azure a garb of wheat Or as their armorial bearings.
1143–1151			Humbert III, Count of Savoy: It is speculated that the cross of Savoy may have been adopted as a symbol by Amadeus III while on campaign during the Second Crusade, leading to his son Humbert III assuming the same symbol after succeeding his father. The cross of Savoy has been used on seals dated to 1143–1151. There are also two seals that depict Savoy with a shield bearing an eagle.
1146			Henry the Lion, Duke of Saxony and Bavaria: A total of seven seals of Henry's are known. Of these, only the second shows a recognizable lion displayed on his shield. This seal is attached to two documents dated to 1146. It is possible that the lion was also on the first seal (c. 1142), but it is no longer recognizable. The lion remained a symbol of the descendants of Henry, with the ancient House of Welf first adopting Or a lion rampant azure before the modern house took up Or a lion rampant sable for their arms.
1146			Gilbert fitz Gilbert de Clare, 1st Earl of Pembroke: The seals of this uncle and nephew show variants of a common de Clare motif, with Pembroke using a chevrony coat also used by Hertford's sister, while Hertford's seal displays a simplified coat with three chevrons that would be used by Pembroke's son and the later Hertford earls. The charters to which the seals are attached are undated, but placed contextually no later than 1146.
1146			Gilbert FitzRichard de Clare, 1st Earl of Hertford: The seals of this uncle and nephew show variants of a common de Clare motif, with Pembroke using a chevrony coat also used by Hertford's sister, while Hertford's seal displays a simplified coat with three chevrons that would be used by Pembroke's son and the later Hertford earls. The charters to which the seals are attached are undated, but placed contextually no later than 1146.
1148 or 1150			Ponç II, Viscount of Girona and of Àger, Lord of Cabrera: A goat ("cabra" in Catalan) as canting arms of the Cabrera lineage (in the County of Barcelona/Principality of Catalonia) already appears in the "Privilegium Imperatoris" issued by Alfonso VII of León, King of Leon and Emperor of Spain, in 1148 or 1150, where Ponç II appears as royal count and steward of the Kingdom of León, although the bordure of the coat of arms is not yet the bordure of pieces (an exclusive Catalan heraldic charge) of the definitive coat of arms of the future viscounts of Cabrera.
1150			Ramon Berenguer IV, Count of Barcelona: A pattern of red and gold striping is seen in the decoration of the tombs of count Ramon Berenguer II and countess Ermesinde in the mid-11th century (whether the colouring is original is disputed), and the same motif would be adopted for the arms of the dynasty of the counts of Barcelona and of the Principality of Catalonia and Crown of Aragon.
1150			Ramon Berenguer II, Count of Provence: Seems to be a break in the coat of arms of his uncle Ramon Berenguer IV of Barcelona, regent of Provence, who therefore had to wear the shield with four pales from before 1150.
1150–1194			Sancho Garcés VI, King of Naverre: The equestrian seal of Sancho VI, which must predate his 1194 death, includes a coat of arms.
1155–1160			Geoffrey Plantagenet, Count of Anjou: Appearing on funerary enamel commissioned by Geoffrey's widow Mathilda of England between 1155 and 1160 for his tomb (Le Mans Cathedral). The enamel shows four lions on the visible half of the shield, but is generally accepted as representing the same six-lion coat depicted on his grandson William Longespee's tomb effigy and known to have had the same tinctures. A late-12th-century chronicler wrote that in 1128, King Henry I presented to Geoffrey a badge of a gold lion.
1155			Bouchard II, Seigneur of Guise: Guise holds a shield charged with un águila rodeada de un radio de carbunclo
1156			Henry II, Duke of Austria: A seal shows Henry bearing an eagle upon his shield.
1156			Henry the Young King: Son of Henry II of England, Brother of Richard I of England. "A lion".
1160			Ottokar III of Styria: An equestrian seal of similar antiquity is that of Ottokar III of Styria, dated 1160, with an early form of the Styrian panther on his shield.
1160			William I de Garlande, Seigneur en Brie: An equestrian seal.
1162			Philip I, Count of Flanders: Although the various seals and counter-seals of Philippe d'Alsace represent a lion either rampant or contorted.
1163			William FitzEmpress: The seal of William, son of Geoffrey Plantagenet, is attached to a charter dated about 1163. It shows a single lion on both shield and livery, and may be the earliest representation of the arms later to appear on Richard I's first seal.
1167			Frederick V, Duke of Swabia: Frederick V is known to have displayed a lion rampant from 1167.
1177			Matthew II of Montmorency: From a seal.
1178			Renaud II, Count of Soissons: From a seal.
1180			Henry I, Count of Champagne: Douët d'Arcq specifies "It seems that one can see a carbuncle spoke on the shield", in this case as on that of his father Thibaud IV; see above 1138.
1181			Henry II, Count of Champagne: clarified band with potent and counter-potent cotices his brother and successor Thibaud III wears only two simple cotices in 1198; see above 1198.
1181			Frederick VI, Duke of Swabia: Frederick VI is known to have displayed a lion rampant from 1181. His reitersiegel, dated 1188, shows a shield charged with two lions rampant. Frederick's younger brother, Philip of Swabia used three three lions passant-guardant, as seen on a seal dated 1197. The three lions are later (after 1220) are used as the arms of the Staufer after 1220, and later still as the coat of arms of Swabia.
1185–1199			John, King of England: John used a heraldic seal with two lions passant during his tenure as Lord of Ireland before becoming King of England. These he adopted during the last years of the reign of his father, and continued to use the seal during that of his brother Richard. On succession to the throne, he adopted his brother Richard's three-lion coat.
1189			Mathieu III de Beaumont: alias gules, a lion argent, Rietstap.
1189			King Richard the Lionheart: The first documented royal coat of arms of England. With only half of the shield visible, it is unclear if the unseen half had a second lion or if only the visible lion was present, and if the latter, whether the direction the lion faced was relevant or simply reflected artistic licence. Colours are unknown, but several close kin of his father used arms with one or more gold lions on a red background, so these were perhaps the tinctures of this shield.
1190			Ralph I, Lord of Coucy: Rietstap.
1191			Raoul I of Lusignan: it is clearly specified "burly of eight pieces, with the label of five pendants". His successors will wear a "burly of ten pieces, with the label of three pendants".
1192			Ansel de Garlande: DA {{#}}2259, {{#}}2260, Wijnbergen {{#}}32.
1192/93			Welf VI, Welf VII: Heraldic lion in sandstone at Steingaden Abbey, presumably as funerary monument for Welf VI of Bavaria (d. 1191), margrave of Tuscany and duke of Spoleto, of the House of Welf, and his pre-deceased son Welf VII (d. 1167). The original monument consists of the lion on its own, the escutcheon outline was added in the later 13th century. The lion was originally colored blue. The gravestone is considered as the oldest heraldic monument in Germany. The Bavarian National Museum, Munich, where it is located today, estimates that it was created in the years after the death of Welf VI. around 1192/93. However, it is sometimes considered possible that it might have been created after the son's death (1167). But it was not until 1176 that the Romanesque monastery church was consecrated.
1193			Baldwin V, Count of Hainaut: Counter-seal, coat of arms.
1194			Gérard, seigneur de Saint-Aubert: On the seal, the shield bears a border.
1194			Geoffrey III, Count of Perche: Unseal dating from 1194 shows two chevrons (Note: G. Demay affirms, on the dating of the seal of his father Rotrou III in 1190, that the latter did not wear a coat of arms (DA No. 999); but, Rotrou and Geoffroy having both participated in the third crusade, this shield of Geoffroy could be a break of the three chevrons of his father.)
1194			Canute VI of Denmark: The seal of Canute VI, dated c. 1194, shows an early form of what would become the family coat of arms of the House of Estridsen, and in modern times the coat of arms of Denmark, coat of arms of Tallinn and the coat of arms of Estonia.
1196			John, Count of Corbeil: Equestrian seal, shield with besanté border. The seal is interesting especially because it is the last in France representing a nasal helmet. The edging may just be a reinforcement of the shield.
1197			Baldwin V, Count of Hainaut:
1197			Roger de Meulan, Viscount d'Évreux: DA {{#}}2834. As early as 1195, its first non-heraldic seal bears a natural lion passing bypassed (DA {{#}}|2833) (Note: DL Galbreath underlines that the DA No. 2304 attributed to Jean de Meulan, hanging from a donation to the Essarts hospital in La-Queue-en-Brie comes from the same matrix as the DA {{#}}2834 and that his attribution must be corrected.) The colors are hypothetical but plausible since they are identical to that of his brother-in-law Simon III de Montfort, count of Évreux, as well as the old arms of the city of Bernay in Eure.
1197			Philip of Swabia: used three lions passant as seen on a seal dated 1197
1197			Geoffrey III, Count of Perche: This other seal from 1197 shows three chevrons (DA {{#}}999).
1198			King Richard the Lionheart: Richard's 2nd Great Seal of the Realm (reverse) (several surviving exemplars in England and France). The colours are unknown, but likely matched the coat used by his successors, with three gold lions on red, which remain the arms of England.
1198			Theobald III, Count of Champagne: DA {{#}}570. A fine example of a break with his brother and predecessor Henry II. see 1181 above.
1199			Walter II d'Avesnes, Seigneur d'Avesnes, Leuze, Count et de Guise: His father and brother, both named Jacques, may have worn this shield from 1188. (Note: G. Demay affirms on the sole dating of the seal of his father Jacques I^{st} in 1186 that the latter did not wear a coat of arms. But the two Jacques having participated respectively in the 3rd and 4th crusades, this shield could have been worn as early as 1188. This is also the point of view of the site earlyblazon.)
1199			William, Count of Clermont and Montferrand: DA {{#}} 383. His descendants will take the title of dolphin of Auvergne and will affix it to their shield.
1208–1216			Ferdinand II of León: The lion had long been a canting representation of the kingdom of Leon, and its use as an emblem by King Alfonso VII (1126–1157) was reported in the contemporary Chronica Adefonsi imperatoris, though the details of this lion are not provided. An illustration of Ferdinand II of Leon in the "Tumbo A" manuscript, a cartulary of Santiago de Compostela Cathedral, thought to have been drawn during his life, shows the monarch carrying a shield bearing an uncolored lion, while underneath the king a purple lion is shown, together apparently representing proto-heraldic use of a lion emblem. Later in the same manuscript in an illustration dated between 1208 and 1216, Alfonso IX is depicted with a true heraldic device, a shield with purple lion on a silver background that would be used by his son Ferdinand III as personal arms before being quartered with those of the Kingdom of Castile to represent the union of the two kingdoms.
1208–1216			Alfonso IX of León: The lion had long been a canting representation of the kingdom of Leon, and its use as an emblem by King Alfonso VII (1126–1157) was reported in the contemporary Chronica Adefonsi imperatoris, though the details of this lion are not provided. An illustration of Ferdinand II of Leon in the "Tumbo A" manuscript, a cartulary of Santiago de Compostela Cathedral, thought to have been drawn during his life, shows the monarch carrying a shield bearing an uncolored lion, while underneath the king a purple lion is shown, together apparently representing proto-heraldic use of a lion emblem. Later in the same manuscript in an illustration dated between 1208 and 1216, Alfonso IX is depicted with a true heraldic device, a shield with purple lion on a silver background that would be used by his son Ferdinand III as personal arms before being quartered with those of the Kingdom of Castile to represent the union of the two kingdoms.
1220			36 Polish families: Świerczek, Polish noble coat of arms belonging to many families that lived and still live in Poland. The oldest known mention of this coat of arms is a seal from 1220. Historically, this coat of arms was used by 36 Polish noble families.
1231–1240			Conrad of Thuringia: The depiction of heraldic designs on actual cavalry shields (knightly shields), the historical origin of the escutcheon, no doubt date to their depiction on seals in the 12th century. However, this artefact type is very rarely preserved, and the oldest extant examples date to the first half of the 13th century. An early example is the shield of Conrad of Thuringia (c. 1230), showing the Ludovingian lion barry (later the coat of arms of Hessen and Thuringia). In the lower left corner there is a small coat of arms of the Teutonic Order. Exhibited in Marburg Castle.
1237			Ferdinand III of Castile: Ferdinand III had previously used his father's lion arms as his personal coat on the front of his seal, while on the back displayed the arms of Castile to represent the kingdom he ruled through maternal inheritance. When he succeeded his father, he combined the two arms to represent the union of the two kingdoms, creating the earliest known quartered arms, an innovation in heraldic representation that would rapidly propagate throughout Europe.
c. 1250			Counts of Segni: The gravestone of Pope Benedict IX, originally installed in the 12th century, was altered during the 13th century with the addition of a mosaic bearing the arms of the Counts of Segni, the noble family that controlled the Abbey of Santa Maria di Grottaferrata, where the monument was located. Benedict IX himself, however, belonged to the extinct Counts of Tusculum. Since the Counts of Segni claimed descent from the Counts of Tusculum, the inclusion of their heraldic insignia may be interpreted as a deliberate attempt to present themselves as the principal heirs and continuators of the Tusculan lineage.
1250			Florence, Italy: Civic arms of Florence adopted following the expulsion of the Ghibellines by the Guelphs on 20 October, after the Battle of Figline.
c. 1260			Burgher arms: Italian merchants and bankers first adopt heraldic emblems in the mid 13th-century.
1278			Polish clan arms: Alabanda is one of the oldest coat of arms in Poland. The oldest known image of this coat of arms is the seal of two brothers, Stefan Kobylagłowa and Strzeżywoj Kobylagłowa. Historically, this coat of arms was used by 9 Polish noble families.
1282			Topór is one of the oldest Polish coats of arms. The oldest known image is the seal of Żegota, the Kraków voivode. Historically, this coat of arms was used by 639 Polish noble families.
1285			Earliest depiction of Dalmatian coat of arms is Armorial Vermandois (L'Armorial du Héraut Vermandois) from the year 1285 is showing one Lion head on shield with description "Le Roy Danit" archaic French for King of Dalmatia. Another 13th century depiction of Dalmatian coat of arms is from Lord Marshals' Roll from the year 1295 showing three silver heads on blue shield with description "Le Roy de Esclevoni", the King of Schiavoni (Dalmatians).
1294			Pope Boniface VIII: Popes of the late medieval and early modern period used their family coats of arms (the earliest exception being Nicholas V, r. 1447–1455). The coat of arms of Boniface VIII (r. 1294–1303), an early form of the Caetani coat of arms, happens to be the first coat of arms used by a pope preserved in a contemporary depiction.
1290s			Diocese of Ely: Possibly the earliest documented coat of arms for a diocese.
1315			Brno, Moravia, Czech Republic: The oldest known civic arms which were assumed in 1315 show four bars, red and silver. These arms would not be officially granted until 3 February 1645 by Emperor Frederik III of Austria.
c. 1340			Burgher arms (Holy Roman Empire): The earliest coats of arms taken by non-nobles, mostly families of the patriciate of imperial cities (Bürgerwappen), but also free farmers (Bauernwappen), appear in the 14th century. An early example of coats of arms attributed to commoners are found in Codex Manesse, "masters" (Meister, a title given to commoners) Heinrich Frauenlob and Heinrich Teschler (shown here is Teschler's coat of arms from Codex Manesse. The name Teschler translates to "bag maker", and the coat of arms shows argent a bag sable).
1369			Košice, Slovakia: The oldest known coat of arms of a town issued by an official grant, which was ordered by Louis I of Hungary,
1441			King's College (Cambridge): Possibly earliest documented coat of arms for an academic institution, at least in England, granted by Henry VI.

== See also ==
- History of heraldry
- Ancient and modern arms
- Roll of arms
- Attributed arms
