= Historia Welforum =

12th century German chronicle

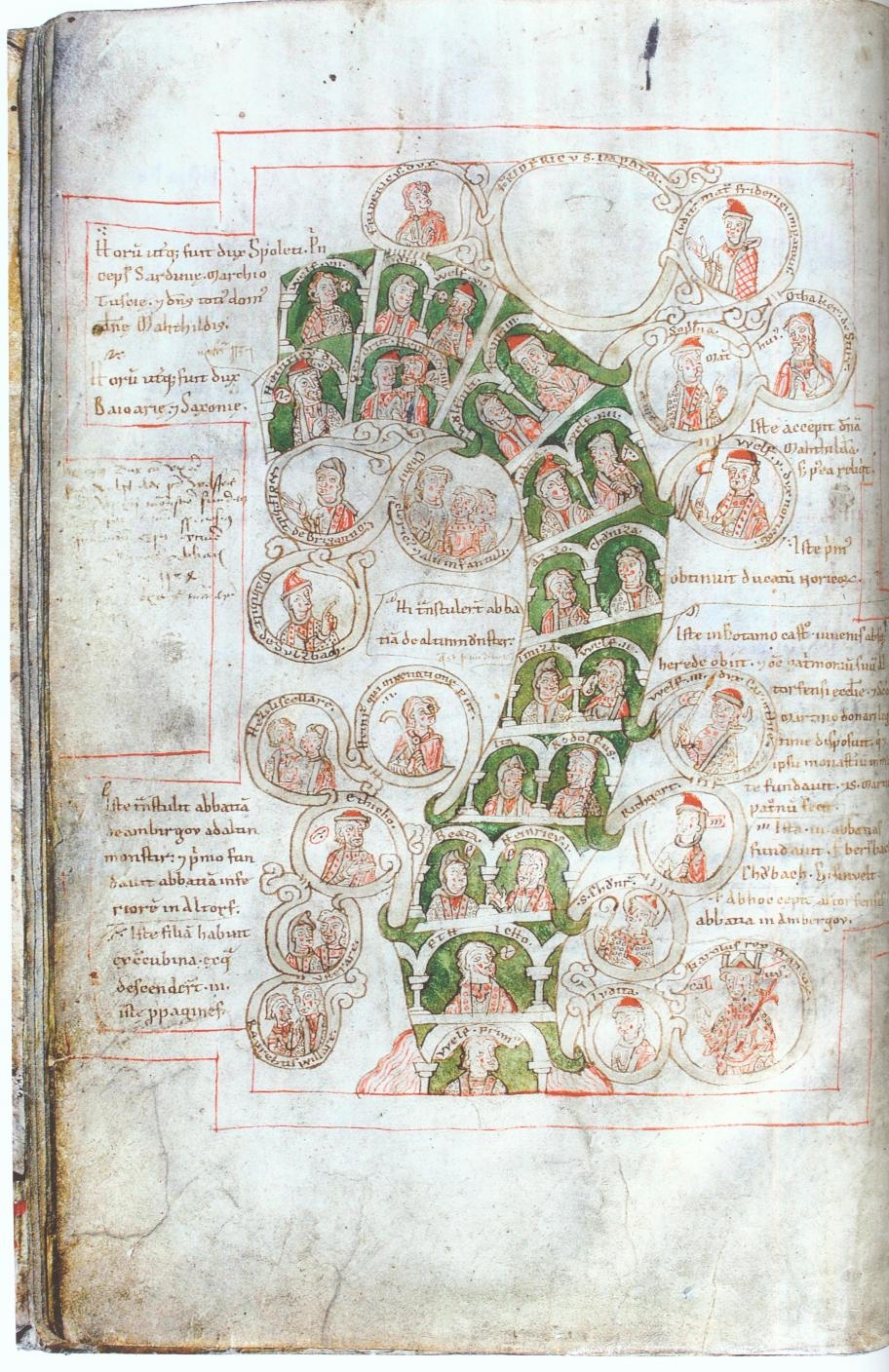
Family tree of the Welfs from the Fulda manuscript of the Historia

The Historia Welforum is an anonymous Latin prose chronicle of the House of Welf written around 1170. The original covers the period c. 825–1167, but continuations bring it down to 1208. Because two manuscript copies originate in Weingarten (Altdorf), the work is sometimes known as the Historia Welforum Weingartensis or Chronica Altorfensium.

== Date and authorship ==
The Historia was composed in Germany between about 1167 and 1184. It was probably commissioned by Welf VI. It seems to present Henry the Lion as the heir of the Welf fortune, which means that it must have been written after the death of Welf VII in 1167 and before Welf VI decided to make Frederick Barbarossa, son of his sister Judith, his heir in 1178.

The anonymous author is generally supposed to have been a cleric in the employ of the dynasty. Among the sources he used were the chronicles of Hugh of Saint Victor and Otto of Freising.

Three subsequent continuations were added to the original Historia. These are known after the monasteries they are associated with as the Continuation Steingademensis for the years 1167–1191, Continuation Weingartensis I for 1152–1197 and Continuation Weingartensis II for 1197–1208. The Continuation Steingademensis reports the arrangement between Welf VI and Barbarossa.

== Manuscripts ==
Five manuscript copies of the Historia Welform survive and a sixth was the basis of a printed edition before it was lost:

- Fulda, Hochschul- und Landesbibliothek, D 11, produced at Weingarten
- Stuttgart, Württembergische Landesbibliothek, H.B. XV 72, produced at Weingarten
- Stuttgart, Württembergische Landesbibliothek, Cod. hist. 2° 359
- Munich, Bavarian State Library, Clm 12202a
- Munich, Bavarian State Library, Clm 29091
- Berlin, Staatsbibliothek, lat. quart. 795 (lost)

== Synopsis ==
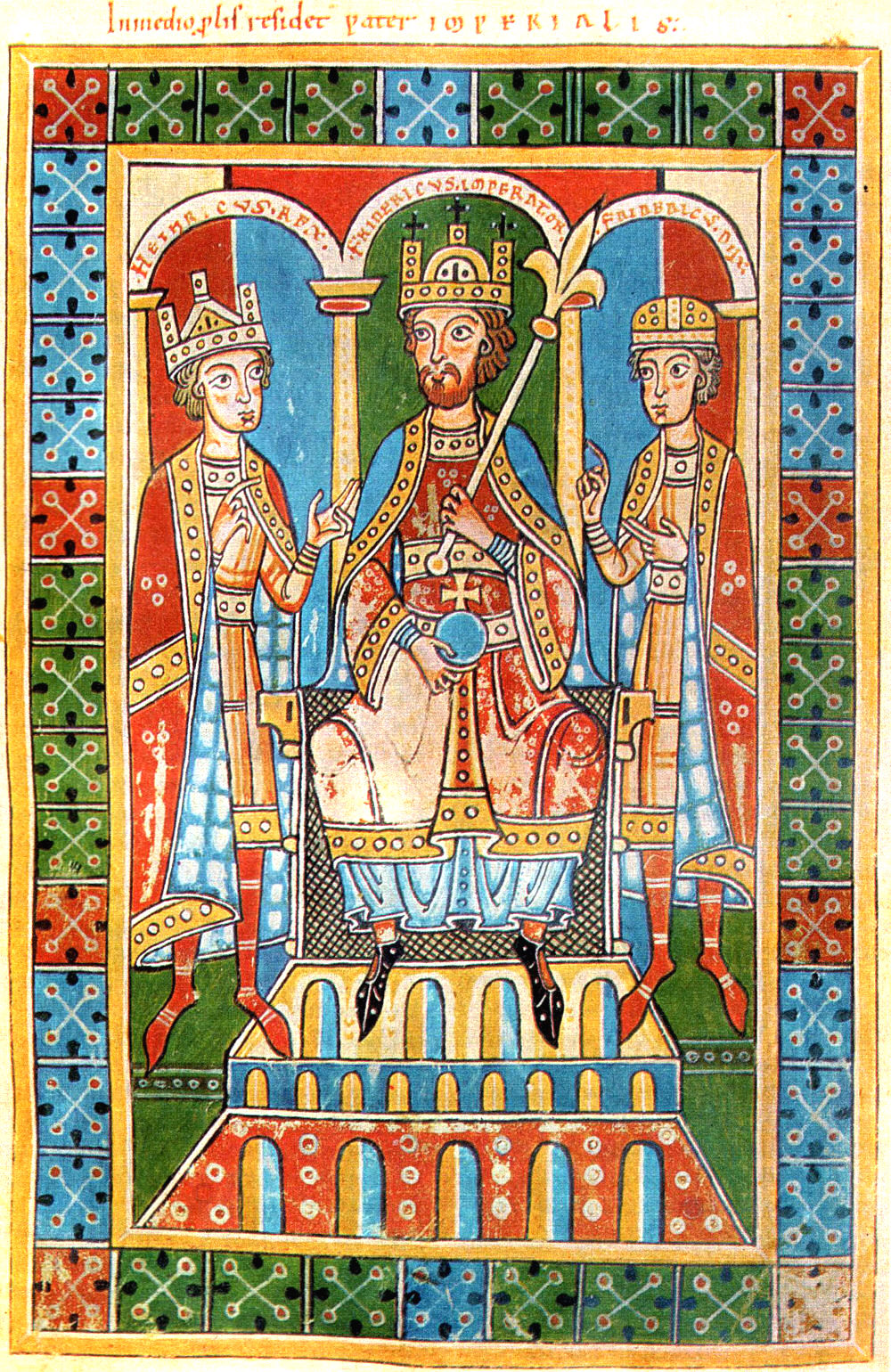
Frederick Barbarossa flanked by his sons at the start of the Fulda copy of the Historia

The Historia is the third and the most detailed of the historical works produced for the Welfs in the 12th century, following the Genealogia Welforum (before 1126) and the lost Saxon Welf Source (1130s). It is the earliest true history of a noble family from Germany.

The Historia presents the Welfs as having quasi-royal status. Their wealth, court offices and monastic establishments—like Altomünster, Weingarten and Steingaden—are emphasised. Despite its pro-Welf bias, it is a valuable historical source.

The Historia attributes mythical origins to the Welfs. They are said to be descended from the earliest Franks and thus the Trojans. The Roman senator Catiline is considered an ancestor and his name derived from Latin catulus, which is synonymous with Middle High German welf, both meaning 'whelp'. (This etymology is found also in the Genealogia.) The earliest historical ancestor mentioned is Count Welf of Alemannia, who died about 825. The history proper begins with him and continues down to the death of Welf VII in 1167.

According to the Historia, when Welf III died in 1055, he left all his entire estate to Weingarten. His mother, Imiza of Luxembourg, overruled his testament and gave the inheritance to Welf IV, the son of her daughter Kunigunde and Azzo II of Este.

The Fulda manuscript includes a family tree that is based on the text of the Historia (with some additions). It is the earliest illustration of a family tree from Germany. At the start of the Historia itself is an illustration of Frederick Barbarossa flanked by his sons, Henry VI and Frederick VI. Barbarossa was a Staufer in the male line, but was a Welf through his mother. The earliest copyists of the Historia saw no apparent opposition between the houses.

== Bibliography ==
- Becher, Matthias (2010). "Historia Welforum". In Bjork, Robert E. (ed.). The Oxford Dictionary of the Middle Ages. Oxford: Oxford University Press. ISBN 978-0-19-866262-4.
- König, Erich, ed. (1978). Historia Welforum (2nd ed.). Sigmaringen.
- Tebruck, Stefan (2017). "The Propaganda of Power: Memoria, History, Patronage". In Graham A. Loud; Jochen Schenk (eds.). The Origins of the German Principalities, 1100–1350: Essays by German Historians. Routledge. pp. 160–180.
- Werthschulte, Leila (2010). "Historia Welforum". In Graeme Dunphy (ed.). Encyclopedia of the Medieval Chronicle. Vol. 1. Brill. pp. 806–807.
