= Battle of Flochberg =

12th century battle in Germany

Coordinates: 48.852°N 10.361°E

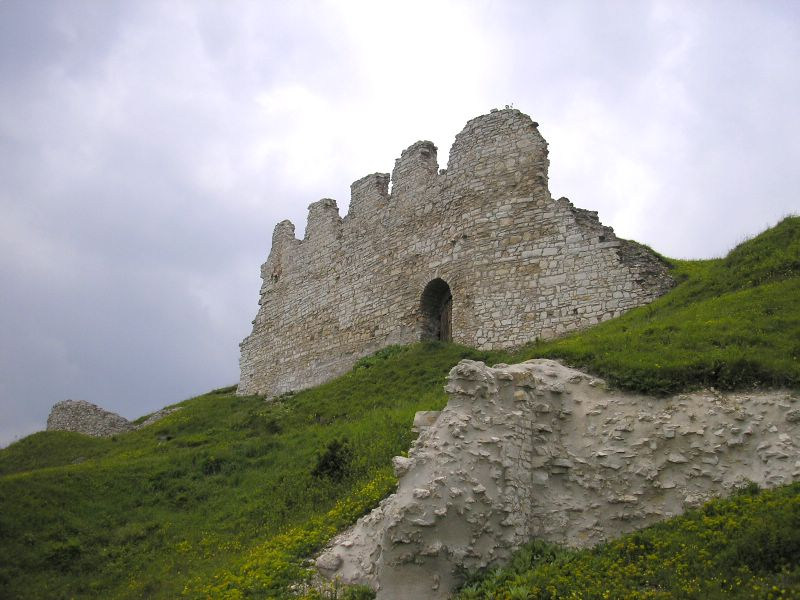
- Ruins of Flochberg
Date	8 February 1150
Location	Flochberg (Bopfingen)
Result	Hohenstaufen victory

Belligerents
House of Hohenstaufen	House of Welf

Commanders and leaders
Henry (VI) of Germany	Welf VI; Welf VII

The Battle of Flochberg (8 February 1150) was a victory for the royal forces of Henry (VI) of Germany over the House of Welf, led by Welf VI and his son, Welf VII. Henry's father, Conrad III, and Welf VI had gone on the Second Crusade together. On his return journey in 1148 Welf had entered into an alliance with Roger II of Sicily, Conrad's enemy. Having agreed to foment discord in Germany, he revived the Welf claim to the Duchy of Bavaria for his nephew, Henry the Lion.

In early 1150, the Welfs raided the possessions of the Hohenstaufen dynasty in the Duchy of Swabia. Conrad sent Henry to intercept them with a few hundred men. Henry's forward reconnaissance troops surprised the Welfs at the royal castle (castrum regis) of Flochberg (Vlochperch), near Nördlingen, as they were retreating from Swabia and pinned them down. When the rest of the royal army arrived, the Welfs' smaller force was routed. Only nightfall allowed some, including the Welfs, to escape.

At the same time, Conrad was besieging Brunswick in the Duchy of Saxony, but he lifted the siege when confronted by Henry the Lion. The conflict was thus frozen at the time of Conrad's death in 1152. The military prowess of Henry (VI) was emphasised in letters to his uncle, the Byzantine emperor Manuel I, Conrad's ally and Roger II's enemy, but the young king died later that year.

== Sources ==
- Knödler, Julia (2010). "Germany: Narrative (1125–1250)". In Rogers, Clifford J. (ed.). The Oxford Encyclopedia of Medieval Warfare and Military Technology. Vol. 2. New York: Oxford University Press. pp. 176–85.
- Fuhrmann, Horst (1986). Germany in the High Middle Ages: c.1050–1200. Cambridge: Cambridge University Press.
- Gregorovius, Ferdinand (1905). History of the City of Rome in the Middle Ages. Vol. 4. G. Bell & Sons.
- Hausmann, Friedrich (1969). Diplomata. Vol. 21. Vienna: Monumenta Germaniae Historica.
- Makk, Ferenc (1989). The Árpáds and the Comneni: Political Relations between Hungary and Byzantium in the 12th Century. Budapest: Akadémiai Kiadó.
- Reuter, Timothy (2001). "The 'Non-Crusade' of 1149–50". In Phillips, Jonathan; Hoch, Martin (eds.). The Second Crusade: Scope and Consequences. Manchester: Manchester University Press. pp. 150–63.
