= Welf VI =

German noble (1115–1191)

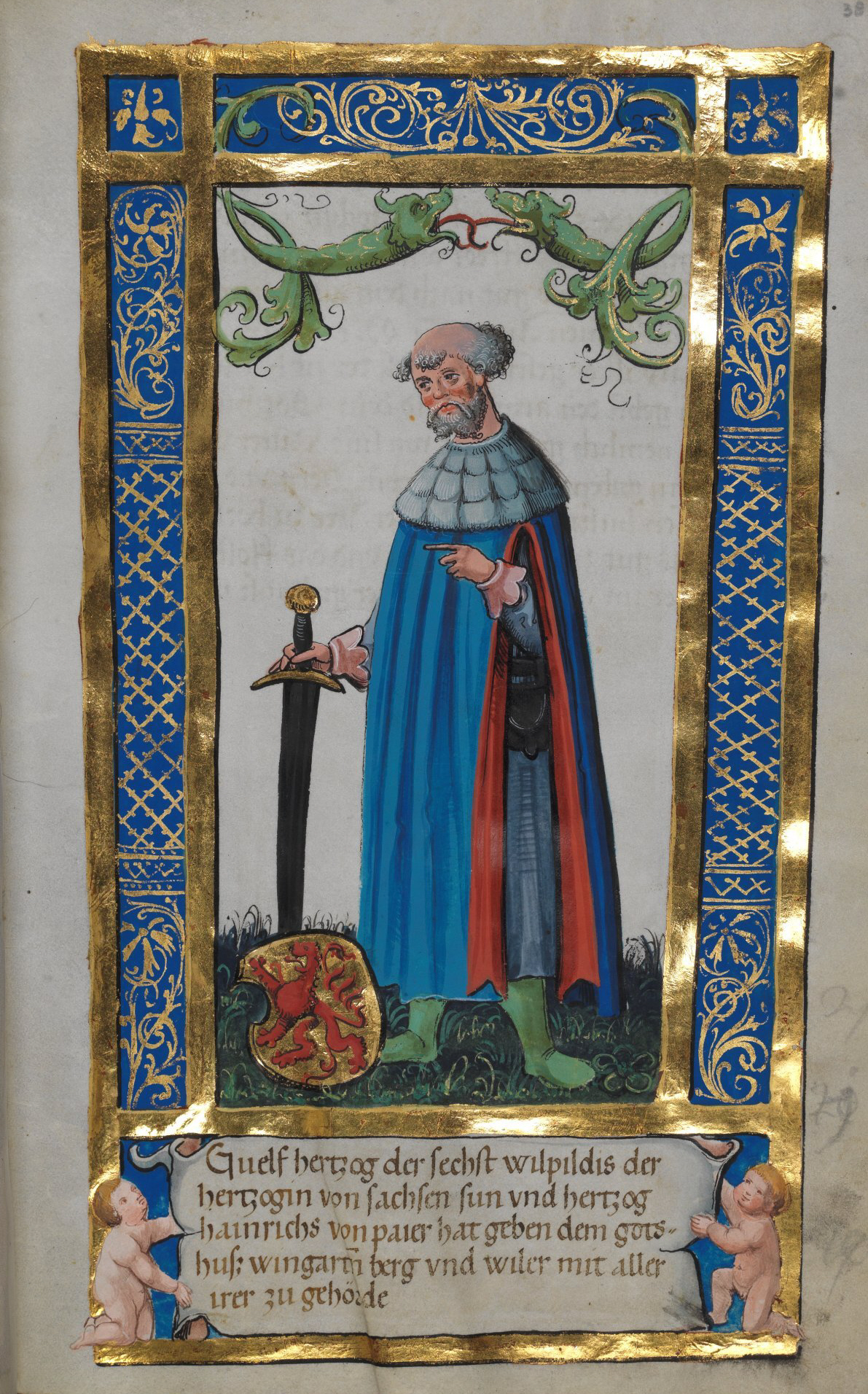

Margrave of Tuscany
- Reign: 1152–1160; 1167–1173
- Predecessor: Ulrich of Attems; Welf VII
- Successor: Welf VII; Vacant

Duke of Spoleto
- Reign: 1152–1160; 1167–1173
- Predecessor: Ulrich of Attems; Welf VII
- Successor: Welf VII; Ridelulf
- Born: 1115
- Died: 15 December 1191 (aged 75/76)
- Spouse: Uta of Schauenburg
- Issue: Welf VII; Elisabeth
- House: Welf
- Father: Henry IX, Duke of Bavaria
- Mother: Wulfhilde of Saxony

Welf VI (1115 – 15 December 1191) was the margrave of Tuscany (1152–1162) and duke of Spoleto (1152–1162), the third son of Henry IX, Duke of Bavaria, and a member of the illustrious family of the Welf (also known as the House of Guelph).

== Biography ==
Welf inherited the familial possessions in Swabia, including the counties of Altdorf and Ravensburg, while his eldest brother Henry the Proud received the duchies of Bavaria and Saxony and his elder brother Conrad entered the church. Henry married Welf to Uta, the daughter of Godfrey of Calw, count palatine of the Rhine. On Godfrey's death in 1131, a dispute opened up between Godfrey's nephew Adalbert and Welf over the inheritance of Calw.

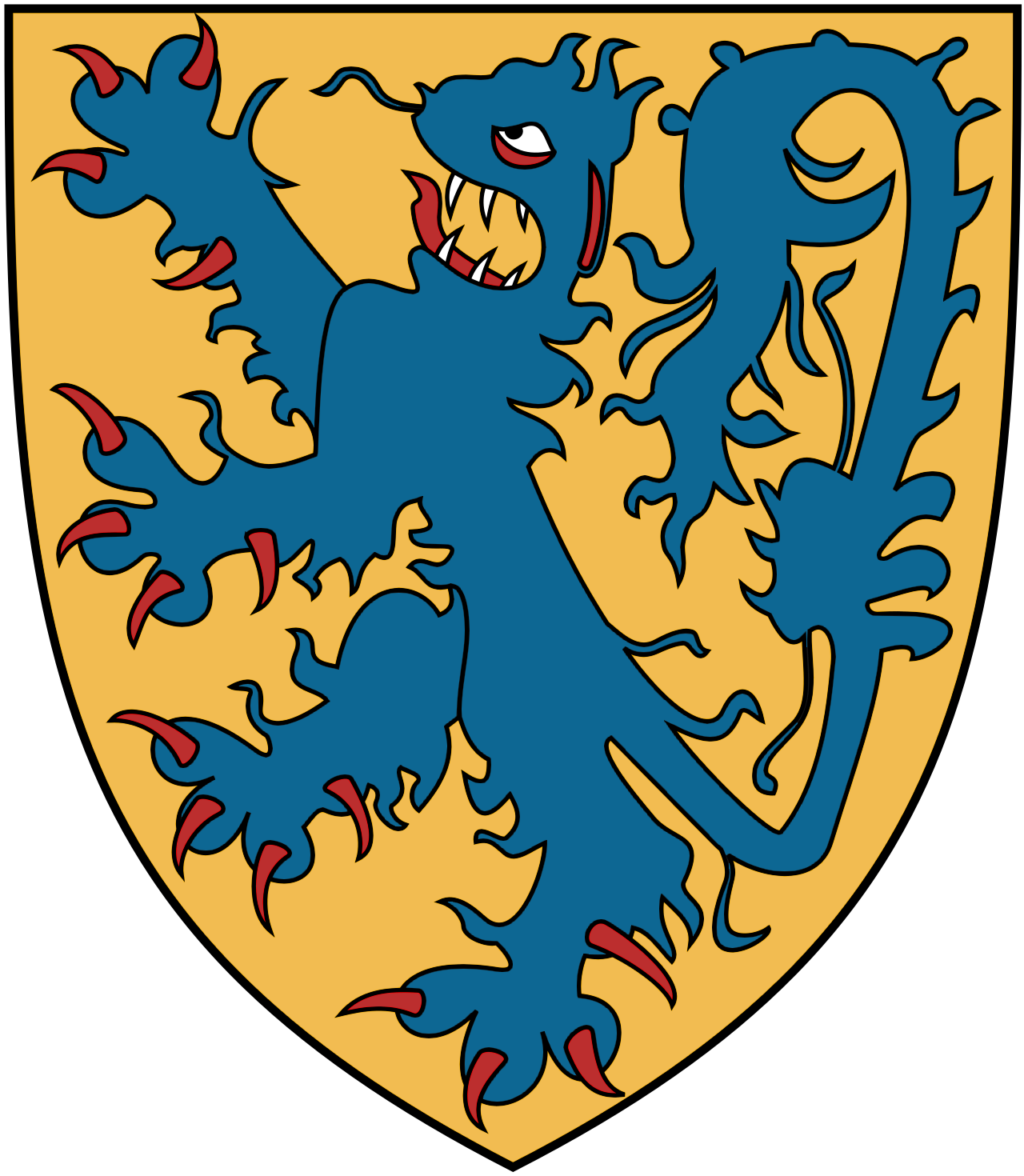
The ancient arms of the House of Welf: Or a lion azure rampant

Welf was an uncle to the Emperor Frederick Barbarossa (Barbarossa's mother, Judith, was Welf's sister). Welf himself was only a decade or less older than his nephew, during whose reign most of Welf's activity occurred.

When Conrad III of Germany, Frederick's uncle, confiscated the duchy of Bavaria in 1142, Welf joined his brother in rebelling. Even though, Conrad III and Welf VI had gone on the Second Crusade together, Welf and his son, Welf VII, were defeated by Henry Berengar, son of Conrad III, at the Battle of Flochberg.

In 1152, the Welfs and the Hohenstaufen made peace and Frederick Barbarossa was elected king. He returned Bavaria to Henry's son Henry the Lion in 1156. In October 1152, at Würzburg, Frederick gave Welf, as the head of his family, the duchy of Spoleto, margraviate of Tuscany, and principality of Sardinia among other Italian properties.

Beginning in the 1150s, a feud broke out between Welf (along with his son Welf VII) against Hugh of Tübingen, count palatine of Swabia. It came to a head between 1164 and 1166 and ended with the resolution of the emperor himself, generally on the side of the Welfs.

When Welf's aforementioned only son died of malaria at Rome in 1167, while campaigning with Barbarossa against Pope Alexander III, Henry demanded the inheritance of all the Welf estates. Welf demanded in return a large sum of money, which Henry did not raise. Welf therefore gave his Italian states to the emperor. Welf remained in charge of his Italian duchies until 1173, while Christian, Archbishop of Mainz, was imperial vicar.

A rift between Henry and Barbarossa over an Italian campaign in 1176 provided the basis for the proceedings against Henry in 1179, which finally deprived him of all his estates, including those he had purchased from Welf. These were given back to Welf, who gave them to Barbarossa's heir, the duke of Swabia, on his death in 1191. Thus, all the Swabian Welf estates passed to the Hohenstaufen, descended from Welf's sister Judith. The male line of Welfs, descended from Henry the Lion, remained with their Billung patrimony in northern Germany.

Welf was a patron of churches. He was buried in the Premonstratensian monastery that he founded, Steingaden Abbey in Bavaria, where his son had also been buried, while most of the other early Guelphs are buried in Weingarten Abbey. He was the patron of the Historia Welforum, the first medieval chronicle of his dynasty.

=== Issue ===
Welf had at least two children with Uta:

- Elisabeth (c. 1135 ); married Albert III, Count of Habsburg
- Welf VII (c. 1140–1167 ); Duke of Spoleto and Margrave of Tuscany

== Bibliography ==
- Freed, John (2016). Frederick Barbarossa: The Prince and the Myth. New Haven, CT: Yale University Press. ISBN 978-0-300-122763.

Italian nobility
Preceded by Ulrich of Attems	Margrave of Tuscany; 1152–1160	Succeeded by Welf VII
Preceded by Ulrich of Attems	Duke of Spoleto; 1152–1160	Succeeded by Welf VII
Preceded by Welf VII	Margrave of Tuscany; 1167–1173	Vacant Title next held by Philip
Preceded by Welf VII	Duke of Spoleto; 1167–1173	Vacant Title next held by Ridelulf
