= Ulrich of Attems =

- Imperial Vicar of Tuscany and Spoleto
- Tenure: 1139–1152
- Born: 1082
- Died: 1170 (aged 87–88)
- Spouse: Diemut of Attems
- Father: Ulrich of Sann
- Occupation: Nobleman

Ulrich of Attems or Ulrich von Attems (1082–1170), was a Friulian nobleman who served as the imperial vicar of Tuscany and Spoleto between 1139 and 1152.

Ulrich was the son of Ulrich of Sann, a member of the Carinthian clan of Asquins who traced their lineage to Saint Hemma of Gurk, and had several possessions in Friuli. He married Diemut of Attems, daughter and heir of Conrad of Attems (1052–1106), who was a Minister of King Conrad III, who regarded himself as the heir of Henry V. Therefore, Ulrich tried in 1128–1130 in opposition to the popes to seize the vast Italian properties of Matilda of Tuscany. In 1137, Henry X, Duke of Bavaria (Henry the Proud) of the Welf family was named the Margrave of Tuscany by Lothair II, Holy Roman Emperor. Shortly before the death of Henry in 1139, Ulrich was appointed by Conrad (who succeeded Lothair) as vicar there. This led to further conflicts between Konrad and the Welf family. Ulrich as vicar ruled over Tuscany and Spoleto until 1152.

During his time in Tuscany, the Normans from the Kingdom of Sicily attacked and conquered northern Abruzzo (at that time part of the Duchy of Spoleto) in 1140. King Roger II of Sicily sent his son Alfonso of Capua, supported by his eldest son Roger III, Duke of Apulia, across the border at Pescara, which overwhelmed the defensive forces against them. The resulting territory up to the Tronto River was then incorporated into the Kingdom of Sicily.

Subsequently, Ulrich had difficulty maintaining and consolidating his power in Tuscany. After the death of Conrad in 1152, another member of the Welf family, Welf VI was named the Margrave of Tuscany and Duke of the remainder of Spoleto by Frederick I.

== See also ==
- Duke of Spoleto
- List of rulers of Tuscany
- Mathildische Güter
- Norman conquest of southern Italy
