= Świerczek coat of arms =

Polish coat of arms

Świerczek
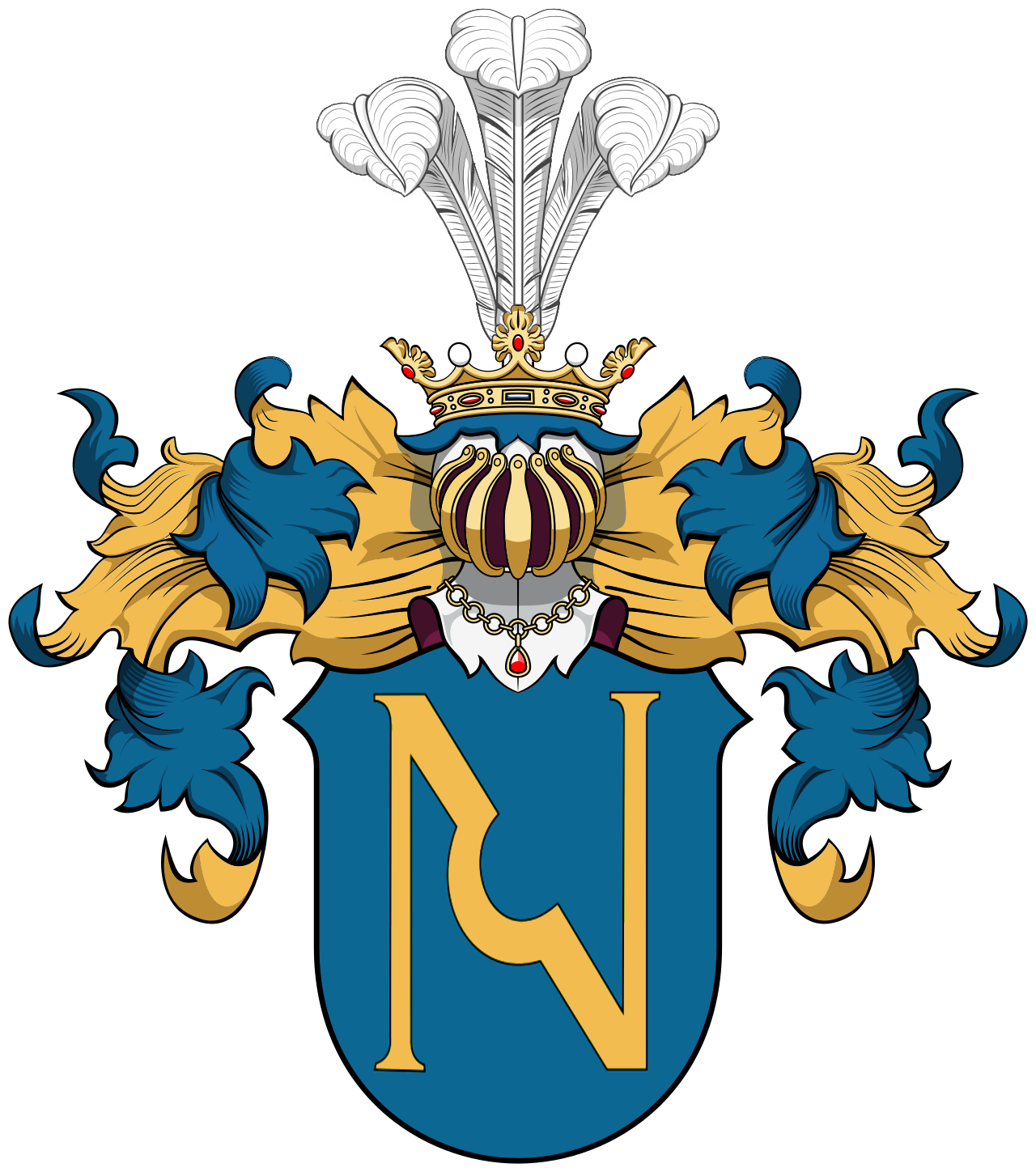
- Earliest mention: 1427
- Towns: none
- Families: 22 names altogether: Arciuszkiewicz, Bazarewski, Kadron, Kijewski, Krajkowski, Kraykowski, Kupiatycki, Orzek, Radziewski, Radziowski, Refkowski, Rewko, Rewkowski, Rewnowski, Rodomański, Rondomański, Straczan, Streczan, Strękowski, Świerczek, Świerczewski, Zwysłowski

Świerczek is a Polish coat of arms. It was used by several szlachta families in the times of the Polish–Lithuanian Commonwealth.

== History ==
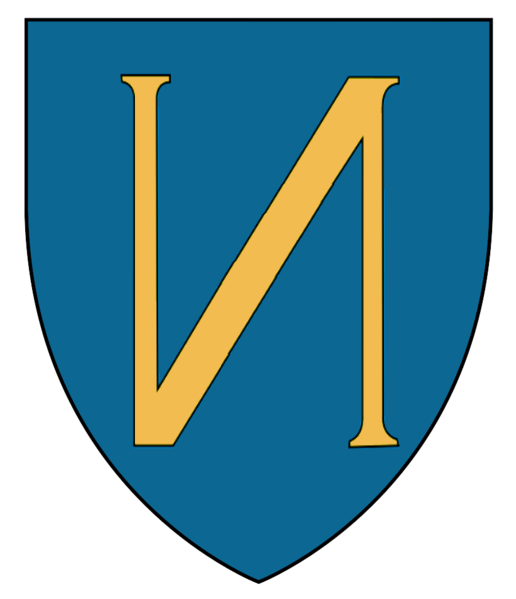
The ancient Świerczek arms as they first appeared in 1220.

== Notable bearers ==
Notable bearers of this Coat of Arms include:

== See also ==
- Polish heraldry
- Heraldry
- Coat of Arms
