= Genealogia Welforum =

The Genealogia Welforum ("Genealogy of the Welfs") is the earliest history of the Welf dynasty. It is an anonymous work in Latin, composed at Weingarten Abbey in the early 1120s. It was commissioned by Henry the Black, the Welf duke of Bavaria who died in 1126. It may have been produced in response to the canonization of Bishop Conrad of Constance in 1123. Conrad was a Welf and his canonization stimulated Henry's interest in his ancestors, since at the same time he took an inventory of his family's tombs.

The Genealogia is a shorter and less detailed work than the Historia Welforum produced a half-century later. It is especially limited in its coverage of the Welfs before Conrad. It contains nothing on the Burgundian branch. It does report the legend that the Welfs were descended from the Roman senator Catiline, whose name is derived from the Latin catulus, which is synonymous with Middle High German welf, both meaning 'whelp'. The compiler was apparently ignorant of much of early Welf history. The earliest family member he mentions is Eticho, founder of Altomünster Abbey. Some of his information is inaccurate. Henry of the Golden Plough was not a son of Eticho, but lived in the following century. King Louis the Stammerer was never emperor nor was he married to Eticho's daughter Hildegard.

The Genealogia is preserved in Munich, Bavarian State Library, manuscript Clm 21563, at folio 41. It was copied at Weihenstephan Abbey in the 13th century. A copy was made from it in the 18th century, now in Clm 28679 under the title Genealogia de Guelfis.

== Editions ==
- Genealogia Welforum, ed. Georg Waitz, in MGH Scriptores 13 (Hanover, 1881), pp. 733–734.
- Genealogia Welforum, in Quellen zur Geschichte der Welfen und die Chronik Burchards von Ursberg, ed. and German trans. Matthias Becher (Darmstadt, 2007), pp. 24–27.
