= Henry the Lion =

Duke of Saxony (r. 1142–80) and Bavaria (r. 1156–80)

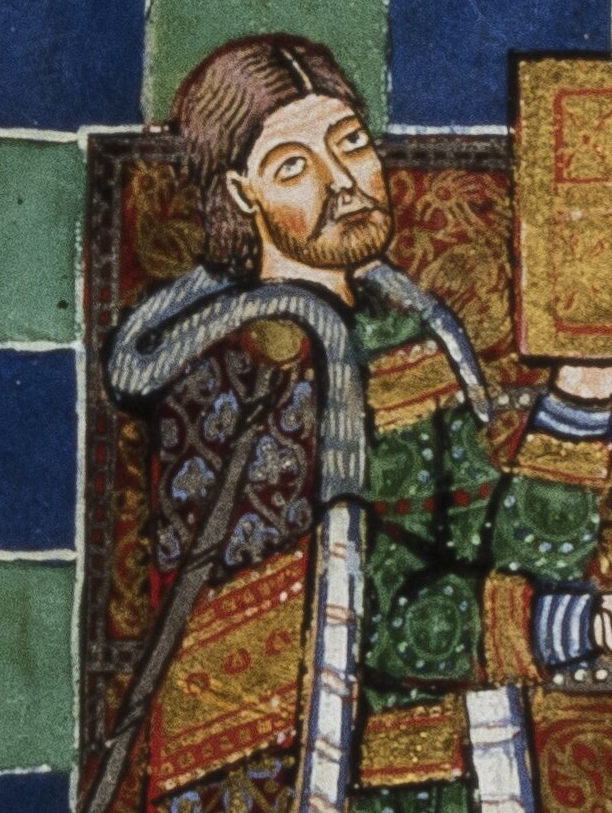
- Depiction in the Gospels of Henry the Lion

Duke of Saxony
- Reign: 1142–1180
- Predecessor: Albert the Bear
- Successor: Bernard III

Duke of Bavaria
- Reign: 1156–1180
- Predecessor: Henry XI
- Successor: Otto I
- Born: c. 1129; Ravensburg, Duchy of Swabia
- Died: 6 August 1195 (aged 65–66); Brunswick, Duchy of Saxony
- Burial: Brunswick Cathedral
- Spouse: Clementia of Zähringen (m. 1147; div. 1162) Matilda of England (m. 1168; died 1189)
- Issue: Gertrude, Queen of Denmark; Matilda of Saxony; Henry V, Count Palatine of the Rhine; Otto IV, Holy Roman Emperor; William, Lord of Lüneburg
- House: Welf
- Father: Henry the Proud
- Mother: Gertrude of Süpplingenburg

Henry the Lion (German: Heinrich der Löwe; 1129/1131 – 6 August 1195), also known as Henry III, Duke of Saxony (ruled 1142–1180) and Henry XII, Duke of Bavaria (ruled 1156–1180), was a member of the Welf dynasty.

Henry was one of the most powerful German princes of his time. As the Duke of Saxony, Henry had had a decisive part in 1152 in his cousin Frederick Barbarossa's campaign for the throne. Because of this, in the following years, he was intensely promoted by Barbarossa. So, in 1156, he received the Dukedom of Bavaria. In North Germany, Henry could now build a kingly presence. He achieved this in Brunswick by building a new collegiate church, St Blaise, and, in the neighbouring Dankwarderode Castle, he placed a statue of a lion, as a symbol of its place as the capital of his duchies. The aggressive building strategy of the Duke in Saxony and north of the Elbe supplanted the influence of the previous greats of Saxony. Next, Henry repaid Barbarossa's sponsorship by putting great effort into his service to the first Italian dynasty.

The agreement between Henry and Barbarossa encountered difficulties when Henry refused to send military assistance in 1176 for Barbarossa's invasion of Italy. With his expedition ending in defeat at the Battle of Legnano against the Lombard League, Barbarossa resented Henry for having failed to support him. In 1176, the rival Hohenstaufen dynasty succeeded in isolating him and eventually deprived him of his duchies of Bavaria and Saxony during the reign of Emperor Frederick Barbarossa and of Frederick's son and successor Henry VI. After the death of Barbarossa, and the failure of the overall Italian political scene and the peace agreement of 1177 (due to campaigning by Pope Alexander III), Henry the Lion overthrew more Dukes, but had to go into exile in southern England.

At the height of his reign, Henry ruled over a vast territory stretching from the coast of the North and Baltic seas to the Alps, and from Westphalia to Pomerania. Alongside Frederick Barbarossa, he was an important protagonist in the Staufen-Welf conflict, which had served as the main political force in the twelfth century. Henry achieved this great power in part by his political and military acumen and in part through the legacies of his four grandparents. He is considered as one of the most important people of this early era.

== Family background ==
Henry the Lion came from the Welf Dynasty. Since the 1120s, there arose more documents in the history of this family, where there were different spellings. This meant the Welfs were the first noble family in the kingdom that we know the history of. The household records in the Genealogia Welforum, in which the Saxon Welf Origins and the Historia Welforum are found, show a link before the Carolingians, and have a possible etymology of the name Welf, which may come from the Latin word catulus (Welpe in German).

The ancestors of the Welfs begin in the eighth century at the time of the Carolingians. The rise of the family came completely from advantageous marriages. The Welf Judith was the second wife of Emperor Louis the Pious, and brought the earliest influence of the Welfs to the history of the Frankish Kingdom. Her sister, Hemma, was married to Judith's stepson King Ludwig the German. This second marriage into the Carolingian royal family secured the rise of the Welfs in the Royal Circle. The fall of the Frankish Kingdom offered an opportunity for the family of the Kings of Burgundy in 1032. After the death of Welf III in 1055 without an heir, the dynasty was thrown into an existential crisis. His sister, Cuniza, married the Margrave Azzo II of Este, changing the future of the dynasty.

The grandfather of Henry the Lion, the Bavarian Duke Henry the Black, married Wulfhild, the eldest daughter of the Saxon Duke Magnus Billung and Sophia, the daughter of the Hungarian King. Large tracts of land around Luneberg the center of power and the burial place of the House of Billung, now went to the Welfs. In 1123 a relative of the family, Bishop Conrad of Constance, was put forward for canonisation, and raised the reputation of the family. The Welf Judith, daughter of Henry the Black, married the Hohenstaufen Duke Frederick II, the father of Frederick Barbarossa. The candidacy of Frederick II as the successor to the ore rich lands of the late, childless Henry V stayed unsponsored. Instead, the Saxon duke Lothar III was preferred. The usual sponsors of Henry the Black were split between him and Duke Lothar. Some of these sponsors were won over by Lothar marrying his only daughter Gertrude to Henry's son, Henry the Proud. Gertrude’s mother was Richenza, heiress of the Saxon territories of Northeim and the properties of the Brunones, counts of Brunswick. From this union came Henry the Lion. He was probably born in Ravensburg between 1129 and 1135.

Soon after, Henry the Proud gained a conglomeration of duchies, close to the size of a kingdom. At the end of the reign of his father in law Lothar, he ruled over the duchies of Bavaria and Saxony, and over the March of Tuscany in the Mathilda Guter, specifically the extensive lands in Swabia, Bavaria, Saxony and Italy. Henry's father died in 1139, aged 32, when Henry was still a child. King Conrad III had dispossessed Henry the Proud of his duchies in 1138 and 1139, handing Saxony to Albert the Bear and Bavaria to Leopold of Austria. This was because Henry the Proud had been his rival for the Crown in 1138.

== Rule ==
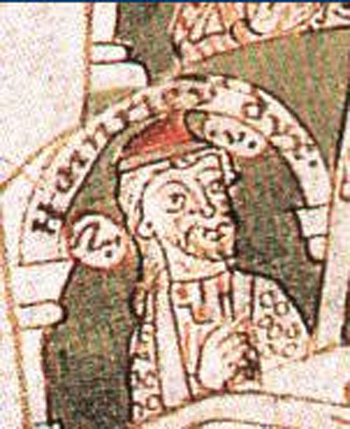
Contemporary depiction of Henry the Lion from the Historia Welforum

Henry the Lion did not relinquish his claims to his inheritance, and Conrad returned Saxony to him in 1142. A participant in the 1147 Wendish Crusade, Henry also reacquired Bavaria by a decision of the new emperor, Frederick Barbarossa, in 1156. However, the East Mark was not returned and became the Duchy of Austria.

Henry was the founder of Munich (1157) and Lübeck (1159); he also founded and developed numerous other cities in Northern Germany and Bavaria, such as Augsburg, Hildesheim, Stade, Kassel, Güstrow, Lüneburg, Salzwedel, Schwerin and Brunswick. In Brunswick, his capital, he had a bronze lion, his heraldic animal, erected in the courtyard of his castle Dankwarderode in 1166—the first bronze statue north of the Alps. Later, he had Brunswick Cathedral built close to the statue.

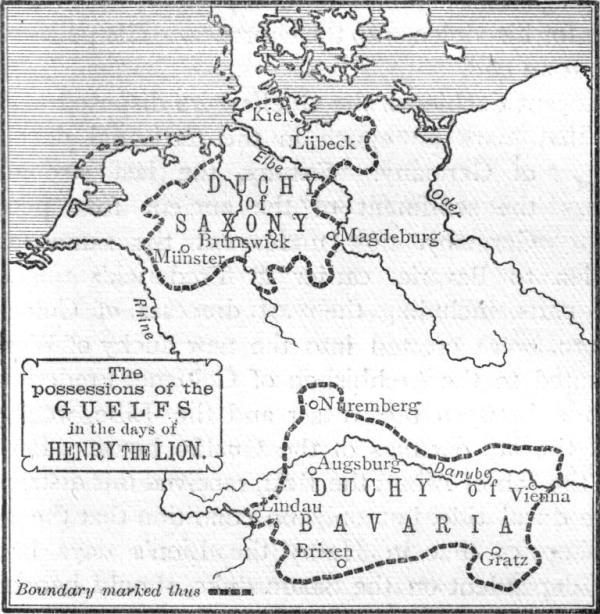
Henry's duchies Saxony and Bavaria

In 1147, Henry married Clementia of Zähringen, thereby gaining her hereditary territories in Swabia. He divorced her in 1162, apparently under pressure from Emperor Frederick Barbarossa, who did not cherish Guelphish possessions in his home area and offered Henry several fortresses in Saxony in exchange. In 1168, Henry married Matilda (1156–1189), the daughter of King Henry II of England and Duchess Eleanor of Aquitaine, and sister of King Richard I of England.

Henry faithfully supported Emperor Frederick in his attempts to solidify his hold on the Imperial Crown and his repeated wars with the cities of Lombardy and the popes, several times turning the tide of battle in Frederick's favor with his Saxon knights. During Frederick's first invasion of northern Italy, Henry took part, among the others, in the victorious sieges of Crema and Milan.

In 1172, Henry took a pilgrimage to Jerusalem (June–July), meeting with the Knights Templar and Knights Hospitaller, (Note: As Arnold of Lübeck reports in his Chronica Slavorum, he was present at the meeting of Henry the Lion with Seljuk Sultan of Rûm Kilij Arslan II during the former's pilgrimage to Jerusalem in 1172. When they met near Tarsus, the sultan embraced and kissed the German duke, reminding him that they were blood cousins ('amplexans et deosculans eum, dicens, eum consanguineum suum esse'). When the duke asked for details of this relationship, Kilij Arslan II informed him that 'a noble lady from the land of Germans married a king of Russia who had a daughter by her; this daughter's daughter arrived to our land, and I descend from her.') and spending Easter of that year in Constantinople. By December 1172, he was back in Bavaria and, in 1174, he refused to aid Frederick in a renewed invasion of Lombardy because he was preoccupied with securing his own borders in the east. He did not consider these Italian adventures worth the effort, unless Barbarossa presented Henry with the Saxon imperial city Goslar: a request Barbarossa refused.

== Fall ==
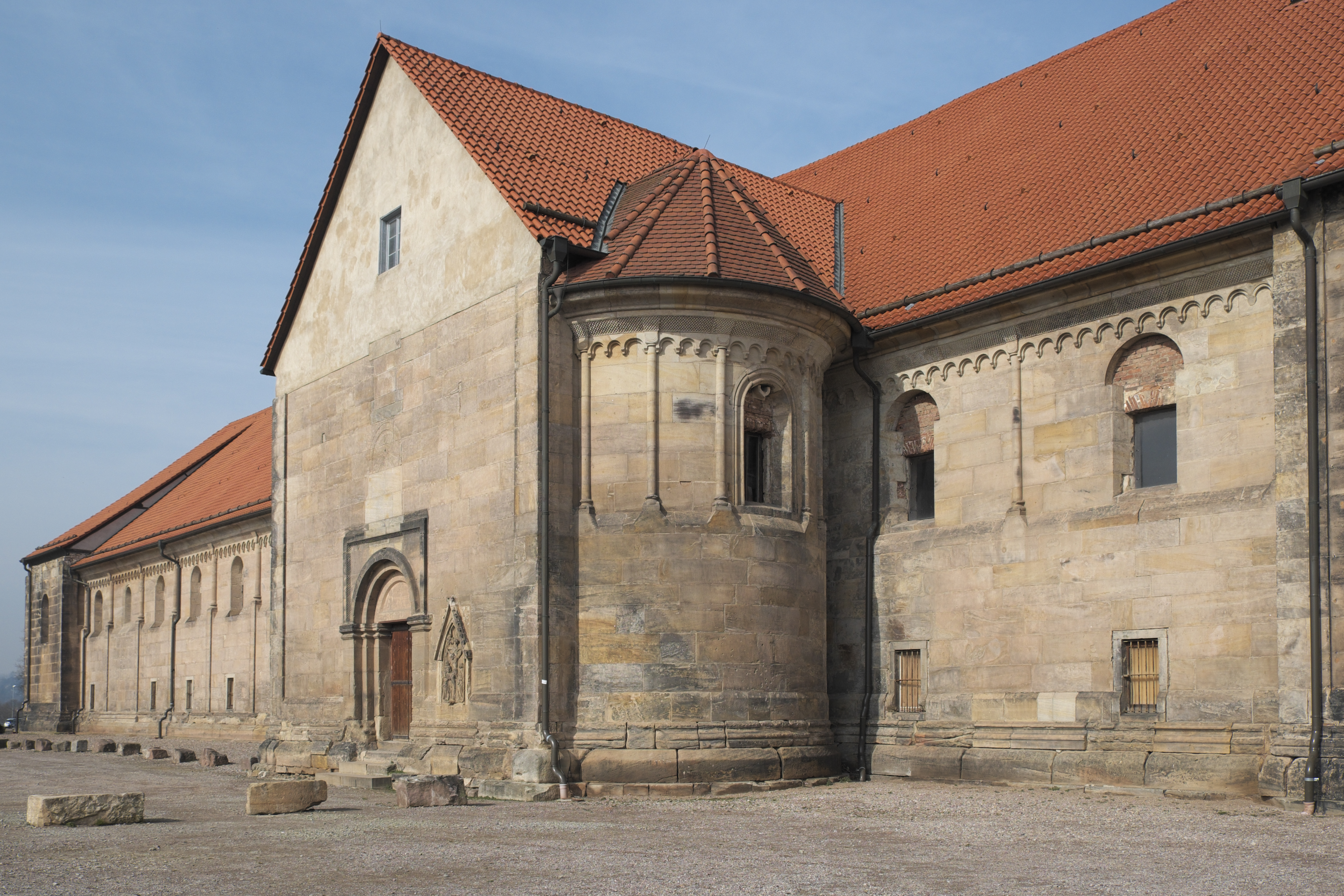
The now-secularised St Peter's Church at Petersberg Citadel, Erfurt, where Henry the Lion submitted to Barbarossa in 1181

Barbarossa's expedition into Lombardy ultimately ended in failure. He bitterly resented Henry for failing to support him. Taking advantage of the hostility of other German princes to Henry, who had successfully established a powerful state comprising Saxony, Bavaria and substantial territories in the north and east of Germany, Frederick had Henry tried in absentia for insubordination by a court of bishops and princes in 1180.

Declaring that Imperial law overruled traditional German law, the court had Henry stripped of his lands and declared him an outlaw. Frederick then invaded Saxony with an Imperial army to bring Henry to his knees. Henry's allies deserted him, and he finally had to submit in November 1181 at an Imperial Diet in Erfurt. He was exiled from Germany in 1182 for three years, and stayed with his father-in-law in Normandy before being allowed back into Germany in 1185. At Whitsun 1184, he visited the Diet of Pentecost in Mainz, probably as a mediator for his father-in-law Henry II. He was exiled again in 1188. His wife Matilda died in 1189.

When Frederick Barbarossa went on the Crusade of 1189, Henry returned to Saxony, mobilized an army of his faithful, and conquered the rich city of Bardowick as punishment for its disloyalty. Only the churches were left standing. Barbarossa's son, Emperor Henry VI, again defeated Duke Henry, but in 1194, with his end approaching, he made his peace with the Emperor, and returned to his much diminished lands around Brunswick, where he peacefully sponsored arts and architecture.

== Children ==
By his first wife, Clementia of Zähringen (divorced 1162), daughter of Duke Conrad I of Zähringen and Clemence of Namur, Henry had:

- Gertrude (1155–1197), who married first Duke Frederick IV of Swabia and then King Canute VI of Denmark.
- Richenza (c. 1157 – 1167)
- Henry, who died young

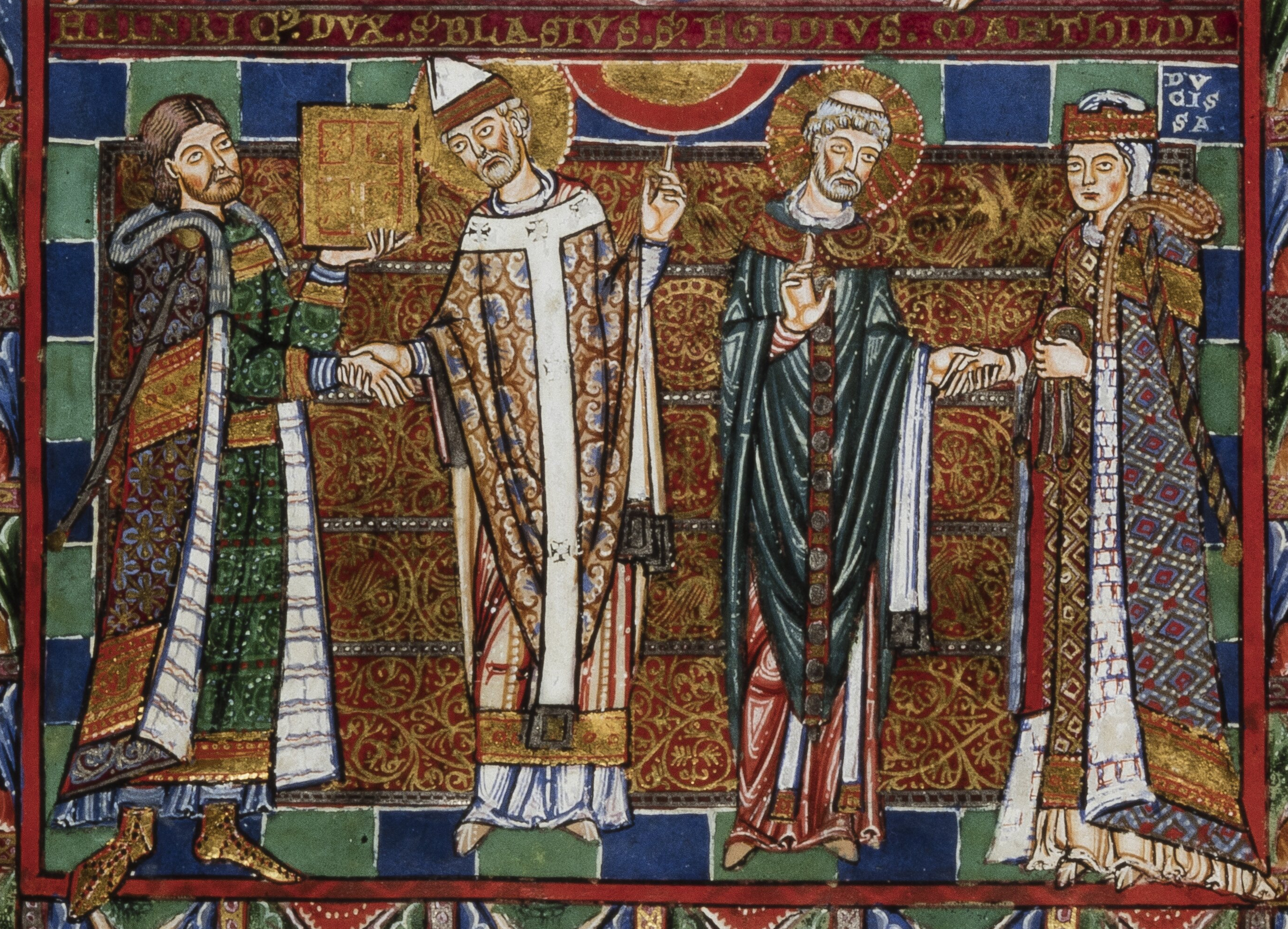
Wedding to Matilda as depicted in the Gospels of Henry the Lion

By his second wife, Matilda (married 1168), daughter of King Henry II of England and Duchess Eleanor of Aquitaine:

- Matilda (or Richenza) (1172–1204), who married first Count Geoffrey III of Perche and then Lord Enguerrand III of Coucy.
- Henry V, Count Palatine of the Rhine (c. 1173 – 1227)
- Lothar (c. 1174 – 1190)
- Otto IV, Holy Roman Emperor and Duke of Swabia (c. 1175 – 1218)
- William of Winchester, Lord of Lüneburg (1184–1213)

Three other children are listed, by some sources, as having belonged to Henry and Matilda:

- Eleanor (born 1178); died young
- Ingibiorg (born 1180); died young
- Son (b. & d. 1182)

By his lover, Ida von Blieskastel, he had a daughter, Matilda, who married Lord Henry Borwin I of Mecklenburg.

== Legacy ==
The Henry the Lion Bible is preserved in near-mint condition from the year 1170; it is located in the Herzog August Library in Wolfenbüttel, a town in Lower Saxony.

Henry the Lion remains a popular figure to this day. During World War I, a nail man depicting Henry the Lion, called Eiserner Heinrich, was used in Brunswick to raise funds for the German war effort.

Nazi propaganda later declared Henry an antecessor of the Nazi's Lebensraum policy and turned Brunswick Cathedral and Henry's tomb into a "National Place of Consecration".

Henry the Lion on the coat of arms of Schwerin

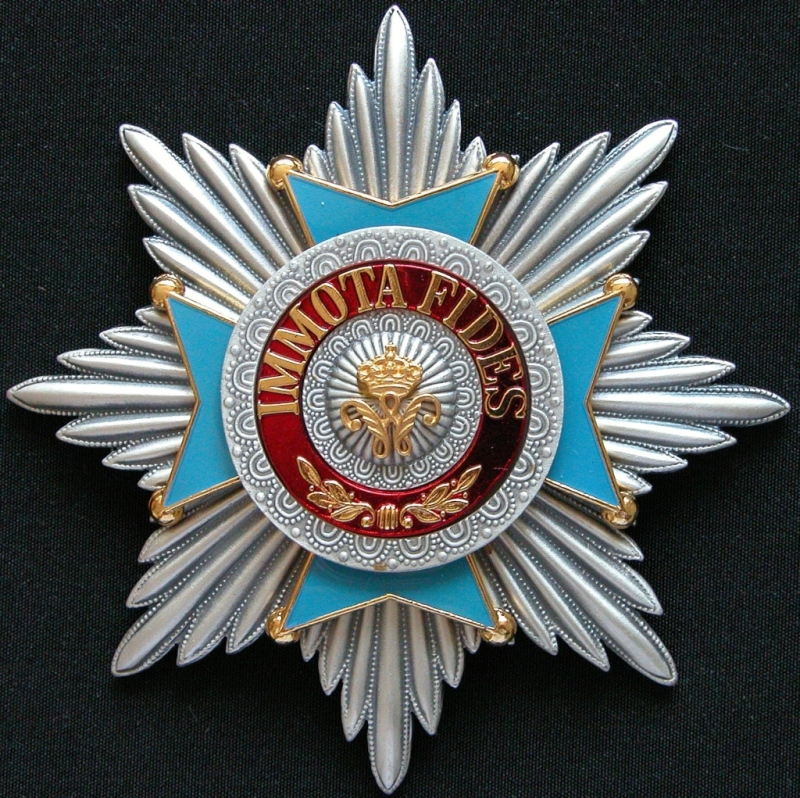
Order of Henry the Lion, order of merit of the Duchy of Brunswick (awarded from 1834 to 1918)

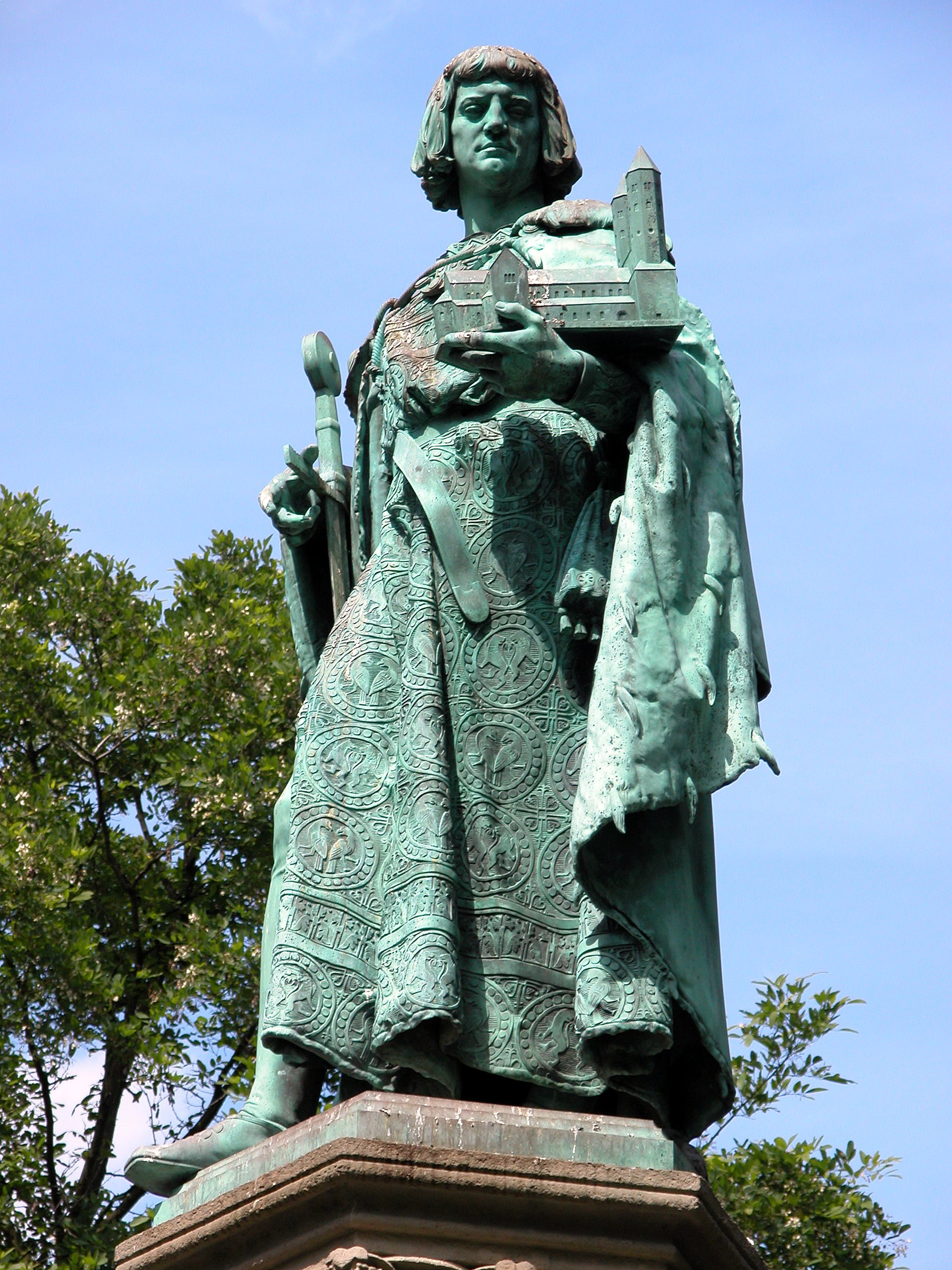
Henry the Lion's Fountain (1874), Brunswick

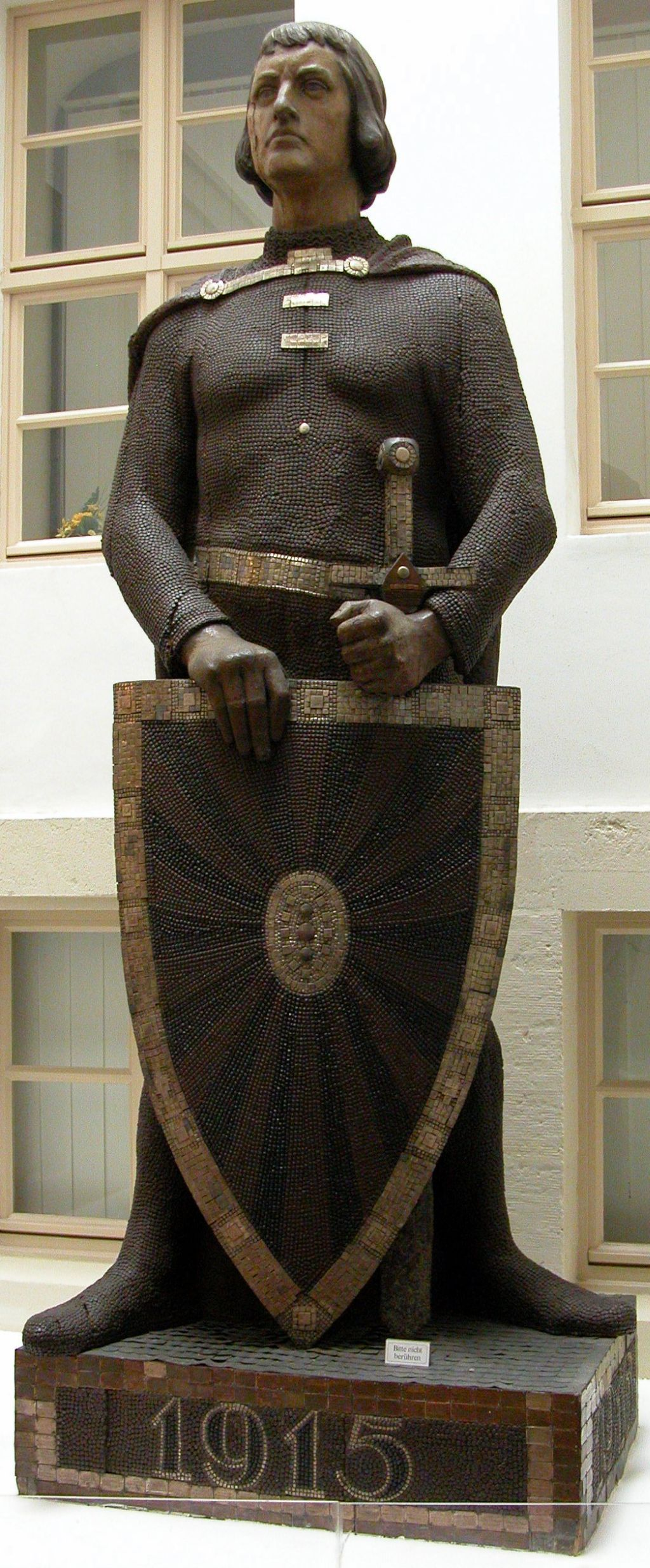
Eiserner Heinrich (1915), Braunschweigisches Landesmuseum, Brunswick

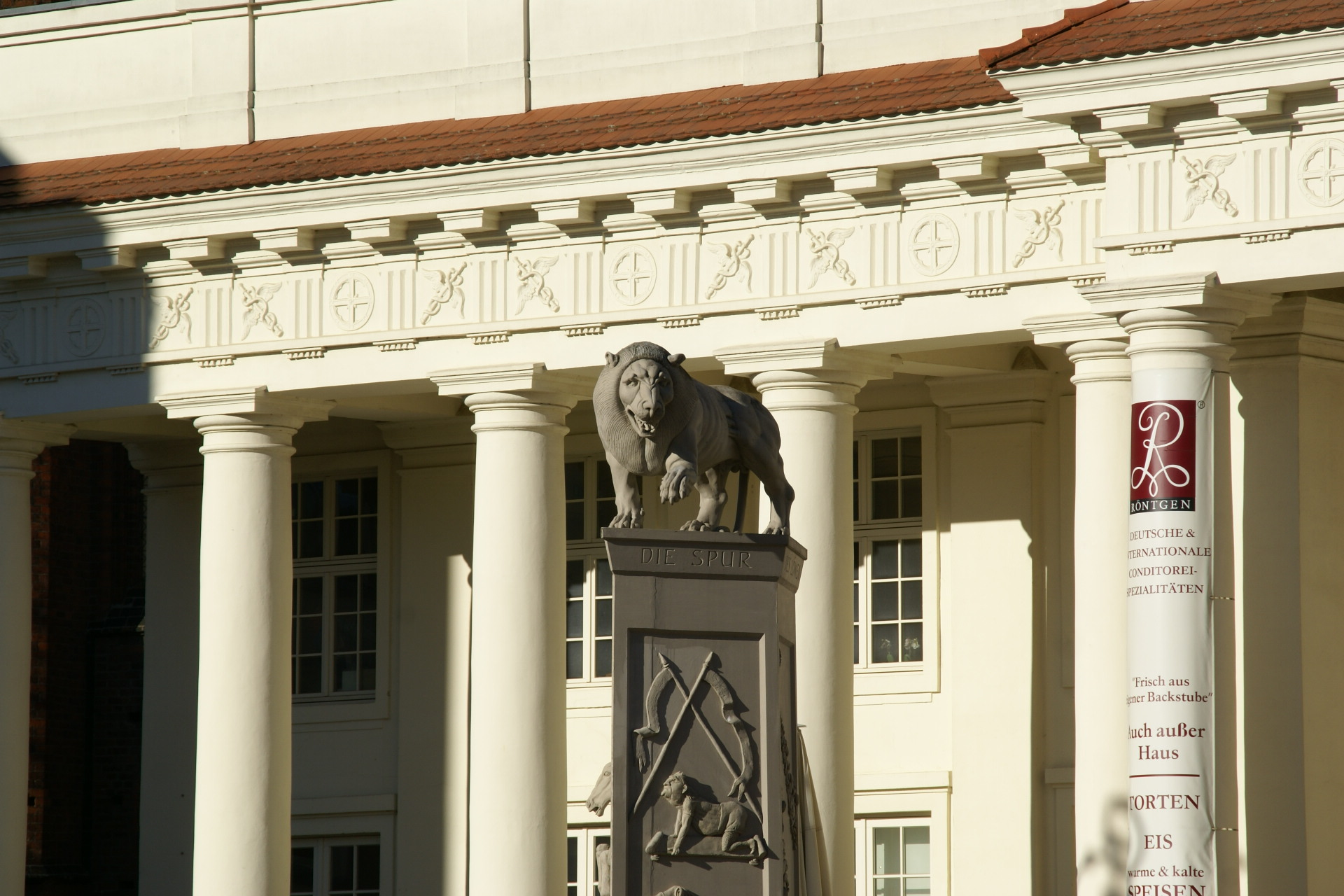
Henry the Lion Monument in Schwerin

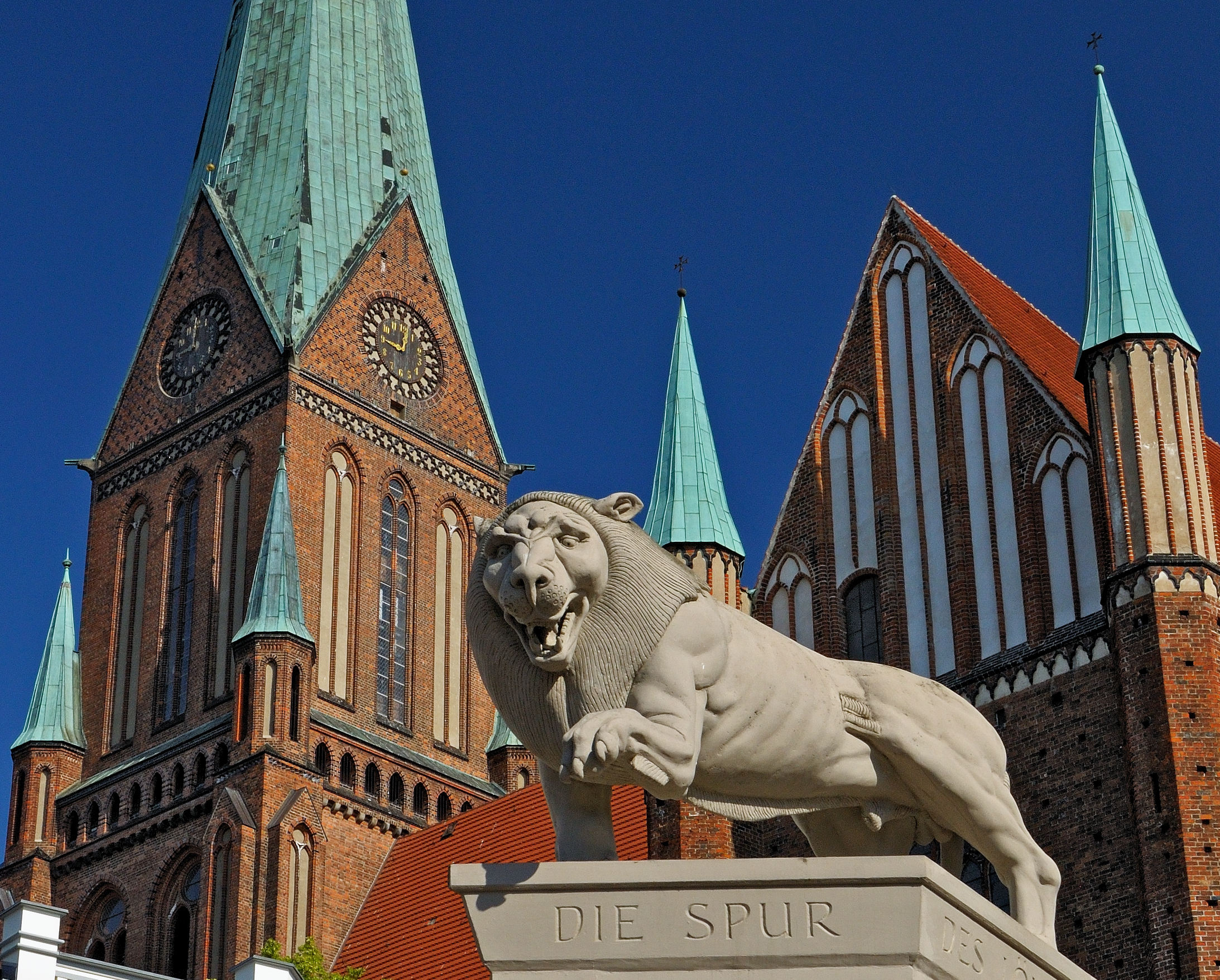
Henry the Lion Monument in Schwerin

=== Folklore and fiction ===
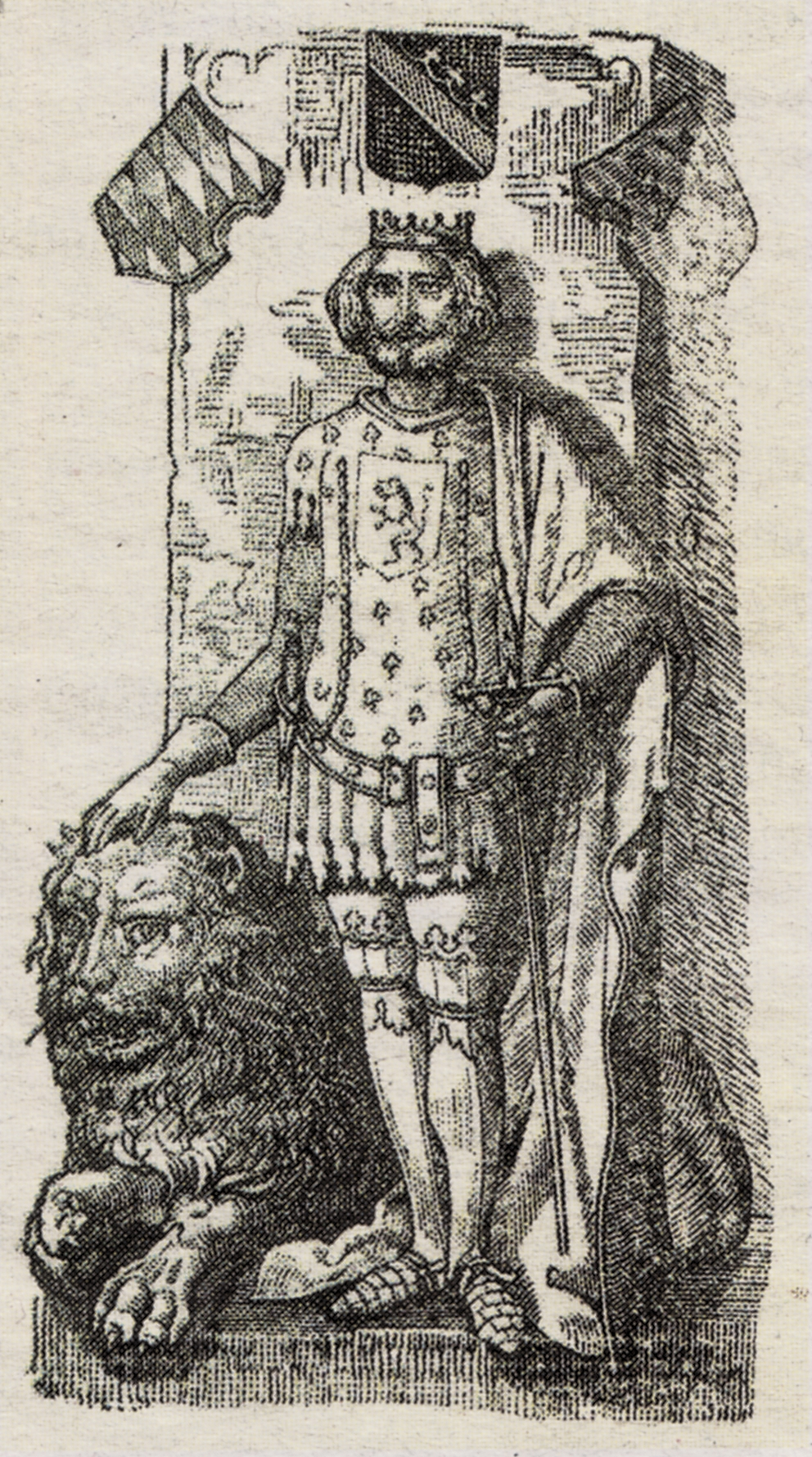
Henry and his lion (title page illustration from Karl Joseph Simrock's retelling of the folktale Geschichte des großen Helden und Herzogen Heinrich des Löwen und seiner wunderbaren höchst gefährlichen Reise (1844))

Shortly after his death, Henry the Lion became the subject of a folktale, the so-called Heinrichssage. The tale was later also turned into the opera Enrico Leone by Italian composer Agostino Steffani. The Heinrichssage details a fictional account of Henry's pilgrimage to the Holy Land. A popular part of the tale deals with the Brunswick Lion. According to legend, Henry witnessed a fight between a lion and a dragon while on pilgrimage. He joins the lion in its fight and they slay the dragon. The faithful lion then accompanies Henry on his return home. After its master's death, the lion refuses all food and dies of grief on Henry's grave. The people of Brunswick then erect a statue in the lion's honour. The legend of Henry the Lion also inspired the Czech tale of the knight Bruncvík, which is depicted on a column on Charles Bridge in Prague.

The book The Pope's Rhinoceros (1996) by Lawrence Norfolk opens with an allegory of a planned ransack by Henry's army of the monastery at Usedom where purportedly a treasure was kept. However, the night before the attack the poorly maintained monastery and its treasures crumble into the sea as the result of a storm, and henceforth constituting a loss to the military expedition.

In the Barbarossa campaign of the video game Age of Empires II, Henry the Lion is depicted as a traitor who betrays Barbarossa twice. At the end of the campaign, it is revealed that the campaign's narrator was Henry himself, now an old man.

The popular video game, Kingdom Come: Deliverance's sequel, Kingdom Come: Deliverance II contains a DLC pack around this legend, where players can get unlock a recipe for a pollaxe and find supposedly his armour around the game.

Henry the Lion is featured as a playable character in the grand strategy video game Crusader Kings III. In the 1178 start date, he appears as the powerful Duke of Saxony and Bavaria, with historical rivalries and alliances reflecting his real-life conflicts within the Holy Roman Empire.

In Mafia II the character Henry Tomasino takes a contract on Leo Galante, they make a deal instead. Earlier in the game he does a job with Vito and Joe Barbaro, the name Barbaro resembling Barbarossa.

== Bibliography ==
- Barz, Paul (1980). Heinrich der Löwe. Munich: Deutscher Taschenbuch Verlag.
- Emmerson, Richard K. (2013). Key Figures in Medieval Europe: An Encyclopedia. Routledge. ISBN 978-1-136-77518-5.
- Loud, Graham A. (2019). The Chronicle of Arnold of Lübeck. Routledge. ISBN 978-0-3676-6045-1.
- Lyon, Jonathan R. (2013). Princely Brother and Sisters: The Sibling Bond in German Politics, 1100–1250. Cornell University Press. ISBN 978-0-8014-5130-0.
- Nicholson, Helen (2001). Love, War, and the Grail. Brill. p. 129. ISBN 90-04-12014-9.
- Previté-Orton, C. W. (1912). The Early History of the House of Savoy: 1000–1233. Cambridge University Press. p. 329 note 3.
- Luckhardt, Jochen; Niehoff, Franz; Biegel, Gerd (1995). Essays. Heinrich der Löwe und seine Zeit. Vol. 2. Munich: Hirmer. ISBN 3-7774-6690-5.
- Sterns, Indrikis (1985). "The Teutonic Knights in the Crusader States". In Zacour, Norman P.; Hazard, Harry W. (eds.). A History of the Crusades: The Impact of the Crusades on the Near East. University of Wisconsin Press. ISBN 978-0299-09144-6.

Henry the Lion House of Welf Born: 1129/1131 Died: 1195
Regnal titles
| Preceded by Albert the Bear | Duke of Saxony; 1142–1180 | Succeeded by Bernard III |
| Preceded by Henry XI | Duke of Bavaria; 1156–1180 | Succeeded by Otto I |
