= Steingaden Abbey =

Premonstratensian monastery in Bavaria, Germany

Coordinates: 47°42′05″N 10°51′45″E

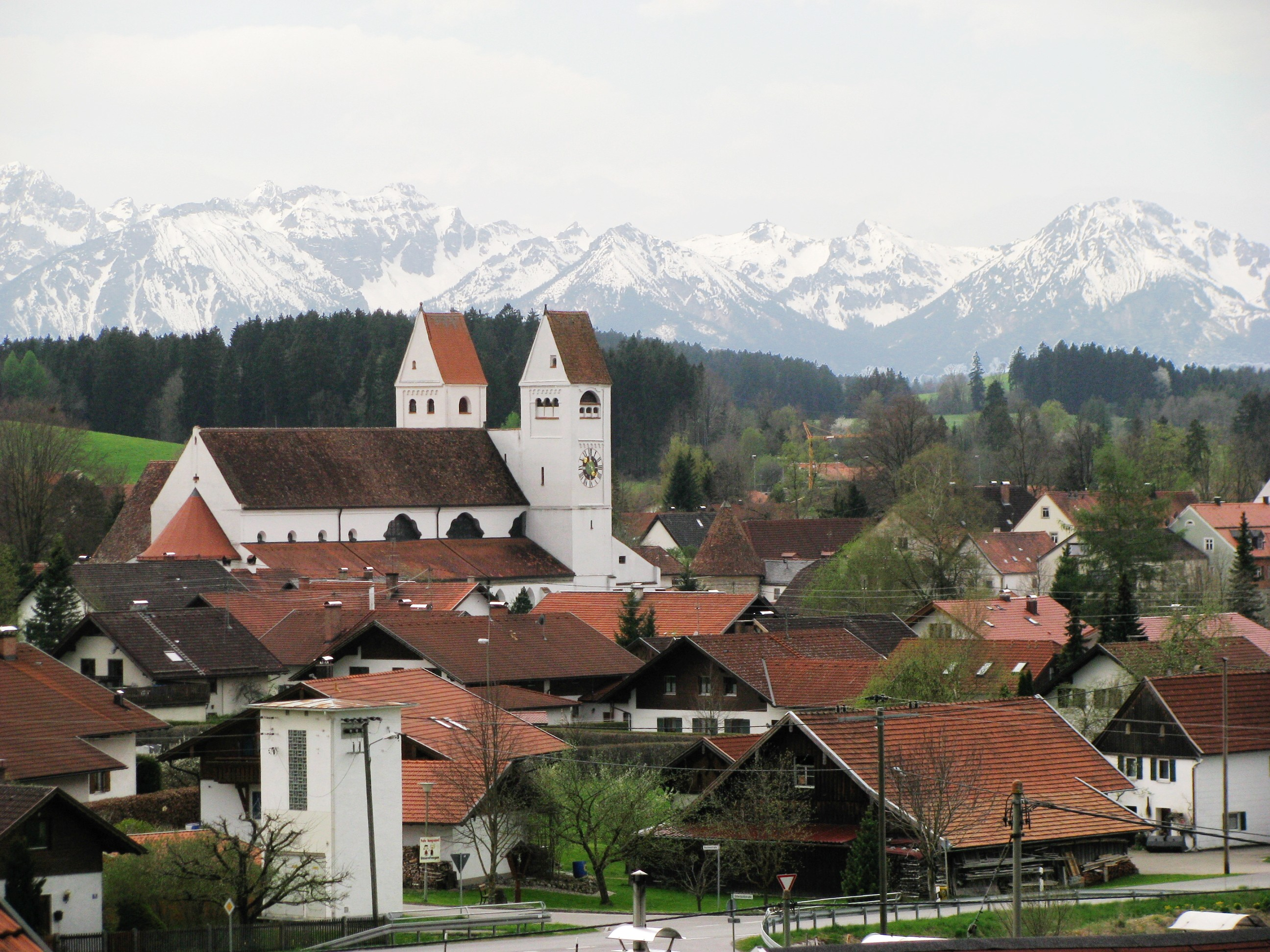
Steingaden Abbey

Steingaden Abbey (German: Kloster Steingaden) was a Premonstratensian monastery in Steingaden in Bavaria, Germany.

== History ==
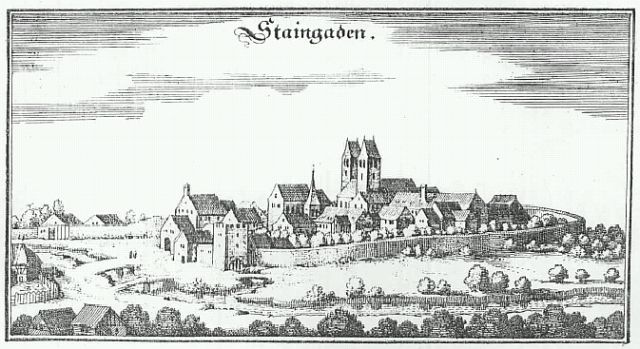
Steingaden Abbey: copper engraving by Matthaeus Merian from the "Topographia Germaniae" of about 1644

Dedicated to John the Baptist, the abbey was founded in 1147 as a Premonstratensian house by Welf VI, third son of Henry the Black, Duke of Bavaria, and brother of Duke Henry the Proud. The first monks and their abbot came from the Premonstratensian Rot an der Rot Abbey. The Romanesque abbey church was consecrated in 1176. Welf VI and his son Welf VII were both buried here. Between 1470 and 1491 the abbey buildings were refurbished under Abbot Caspar Suiter in the Late Gothic style.

The abbey was looted and burnt in 1525 during the German Peasants' War, and was later almost completely destroyed in the Thirty Years' War. Reconstruction was completed in 1663 under Abbot Augustin Bonenmayr in the style of the early Baroque. During the 1740s the nave of the church was redecorated in the Rococo style.

The abbey's prestigious building projects, combined with its inaccessible location, brought it into financial difficulties which remained insuperable to the end of its existence.

== Dissolution ==
Steingaden Abbey was dissolved in 1803 during the secularisation of Bavaria. The monastic buildings were bought at auction by the Meyer brothers from Aarau, who demolished them in 1819, except for the wing containing the Romanesque cloisters.

== Welfenmünster ==
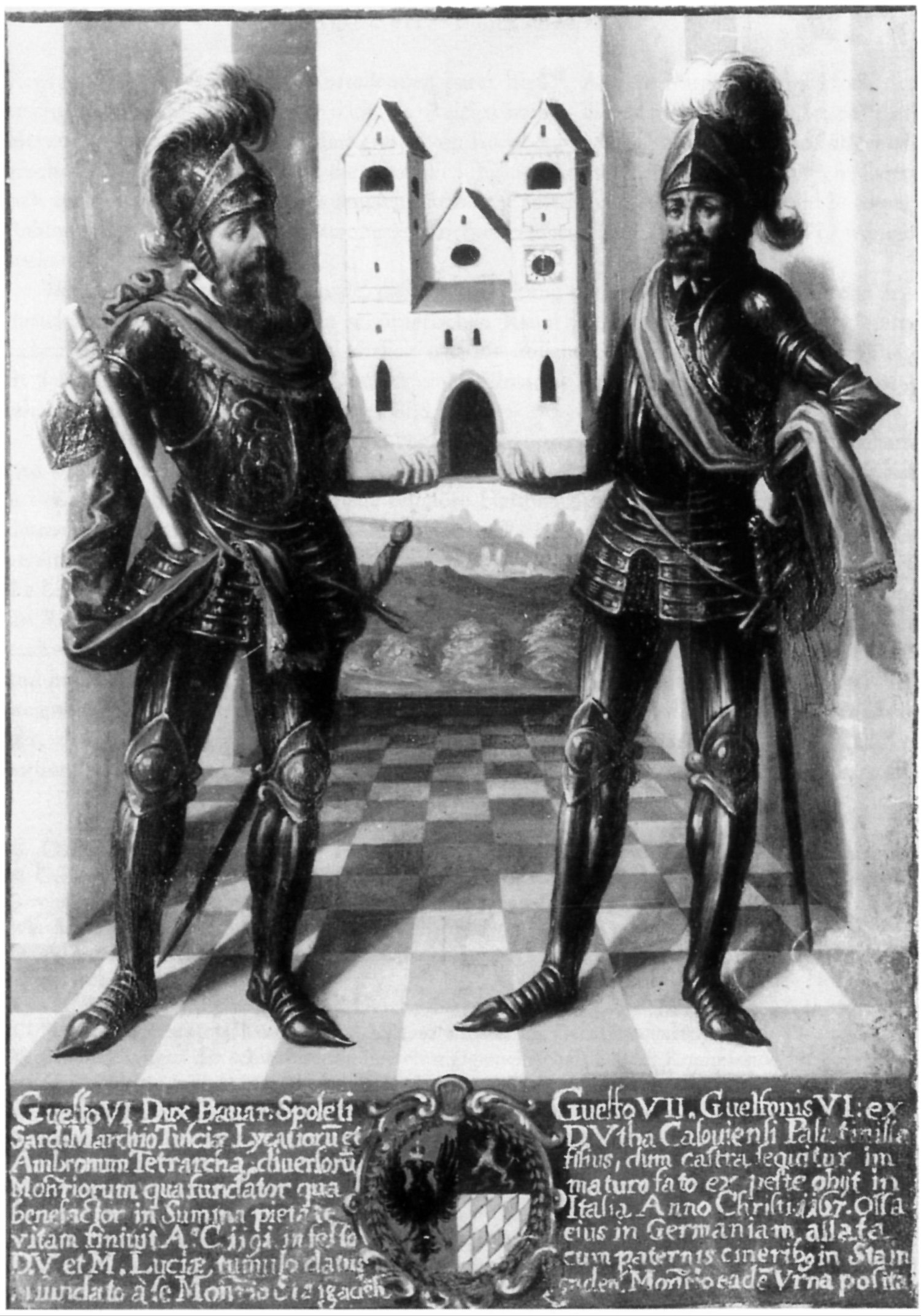
Welf VI and Welf VII with Steingaden Abbey between them (painting on panel, 16th or 17th century)

The former abbey church, the Welfenmünster (Guelph Minster), dedicated to Saint John the Baptist, is a Romanesque building of the 1170s under an extravagant Rococo refurbishment carried out by Johann Georg Bergmüller throughout the whole of the 1740s. It survived the dissolution as the parish church of Steingaden, which it remains. The four-column high altar was built around 1663.

The abbey church was the place of burial of the founder, Welf VI, who died in 1191, and his son Welf VII, who predeceased his father in 1167. Their elaborate tomb was destroyed in 1525. The church retained however a carved sandstone panel of the Welf arms, dating from about 1193 which may well have formed part of the destroyed tomb. Apart from seals and seal impressions this is the oldest known surviving heraldic representation in Germany. The panel was acquired by the Bayerisches Nationalmuseum in Munich in 1861. In 1750 epitaphs of Welf VI and Welf VII were placed on the second pair of pillars in the central nave. Their grave is indicated by a metal plate embedded in the floor of the central aisle. The two Guelphs are also depicted on a fresco by Johann Georg Bergmüller above the organ.

In the late Gothic vestibule with its net vaults, a remnant of a Renaissance painting has been preserved in the form of the “Guelph Genealogy”, which was uncovered in 1951 on the north wall. The paintings show the lineage of the House of Welf (the Guelphs) from the ancestor Albert Azzo I, Margrave of Milan, to Welf VII, as well as the founding of the two elder house monasteries of the Guelphs, Rottenbuch Abbey and Weingarten Abbey (where most of the older Guelphs are buried). The large picture field on the right above the door illustrates the funeral procession of Duke Welf VI.

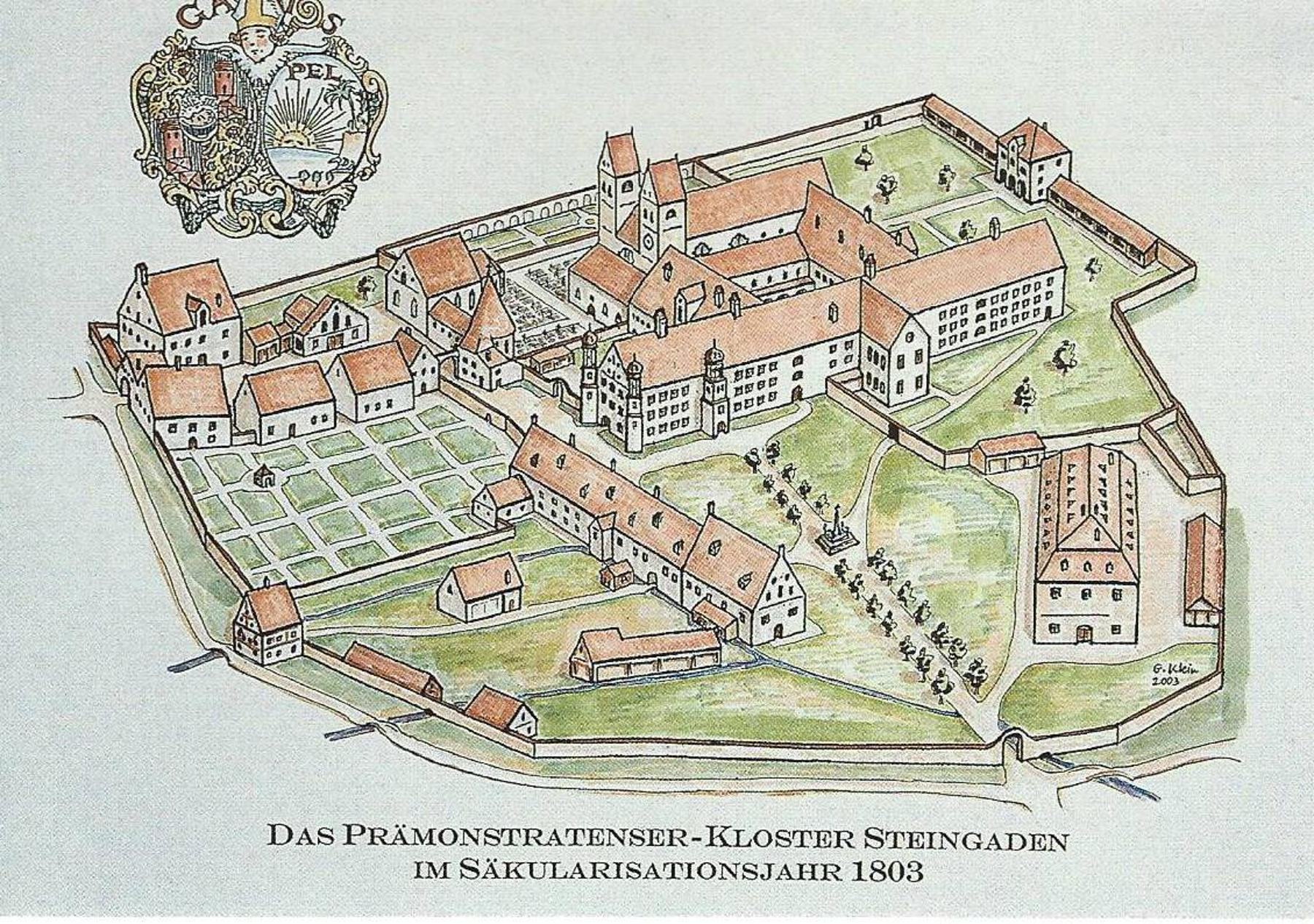
The monastery in 1803 (before its destruction of 1819)

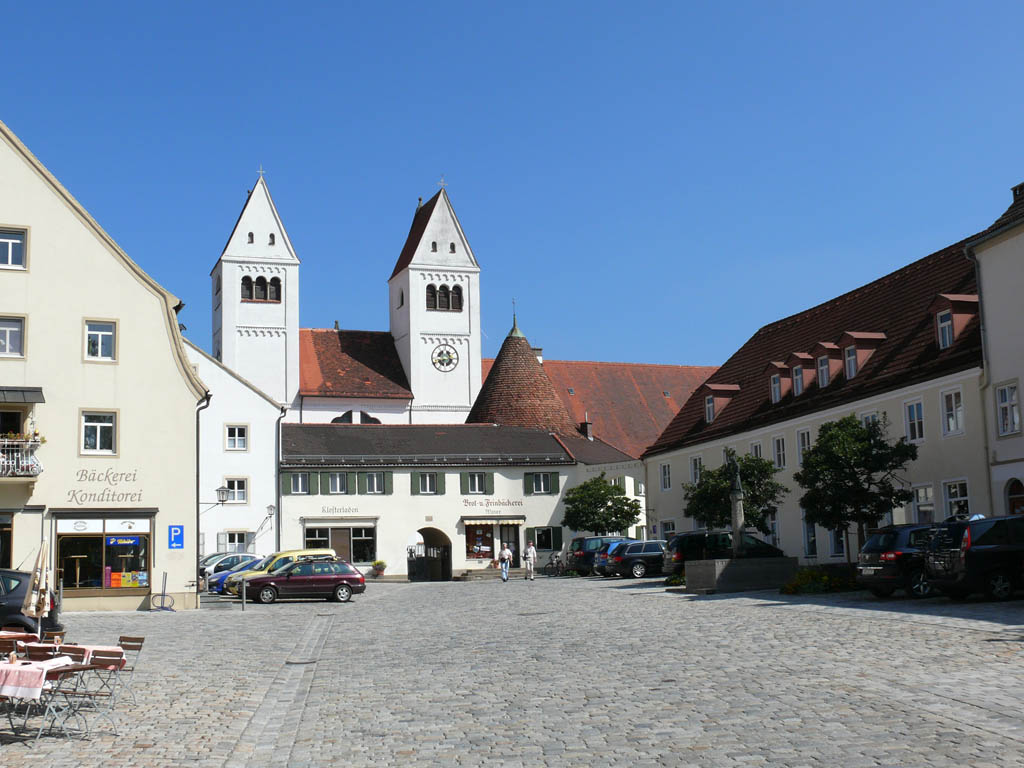
Steingaden Abbey church and market place

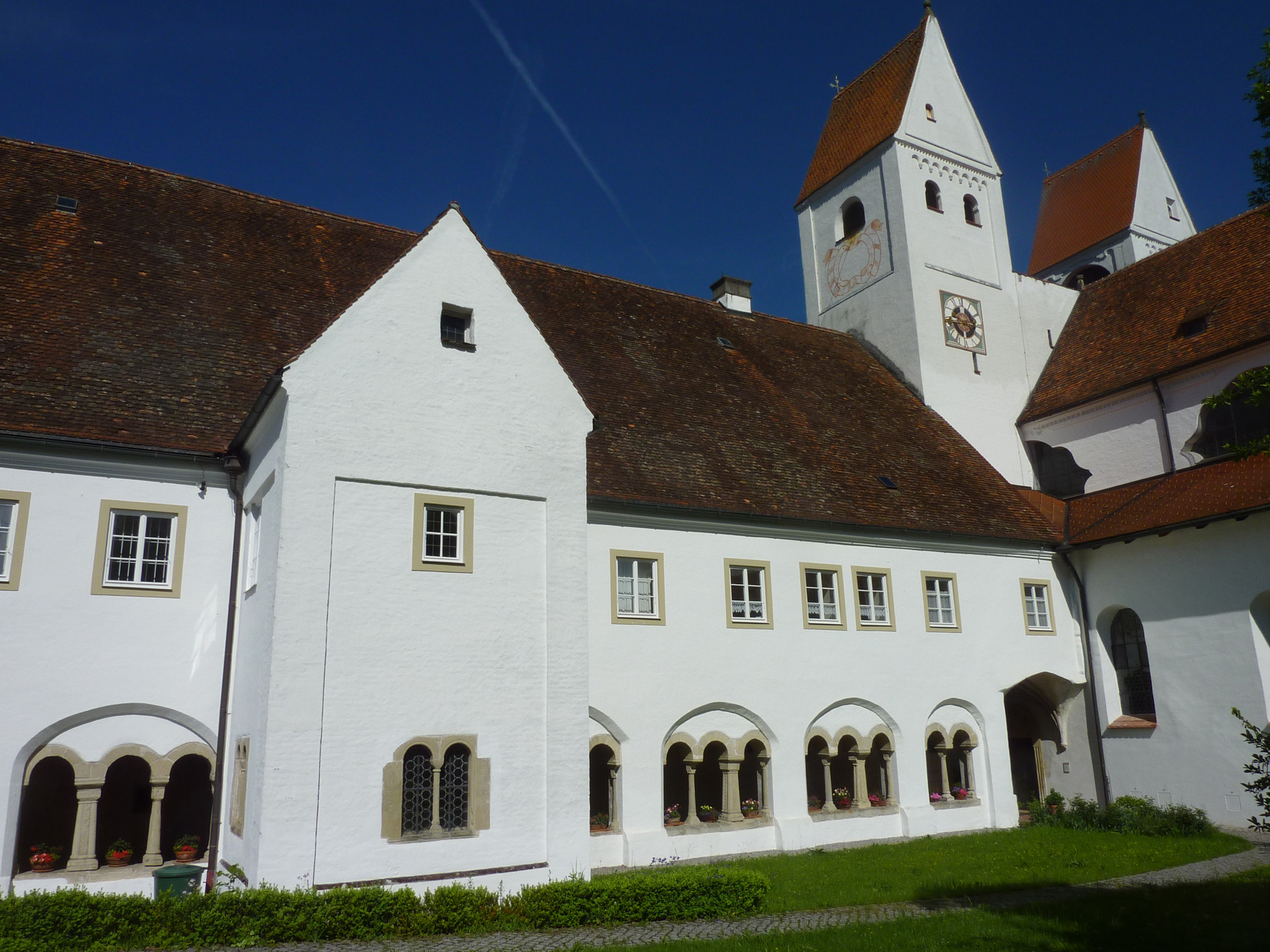
Western cloister wing with fountain chapel

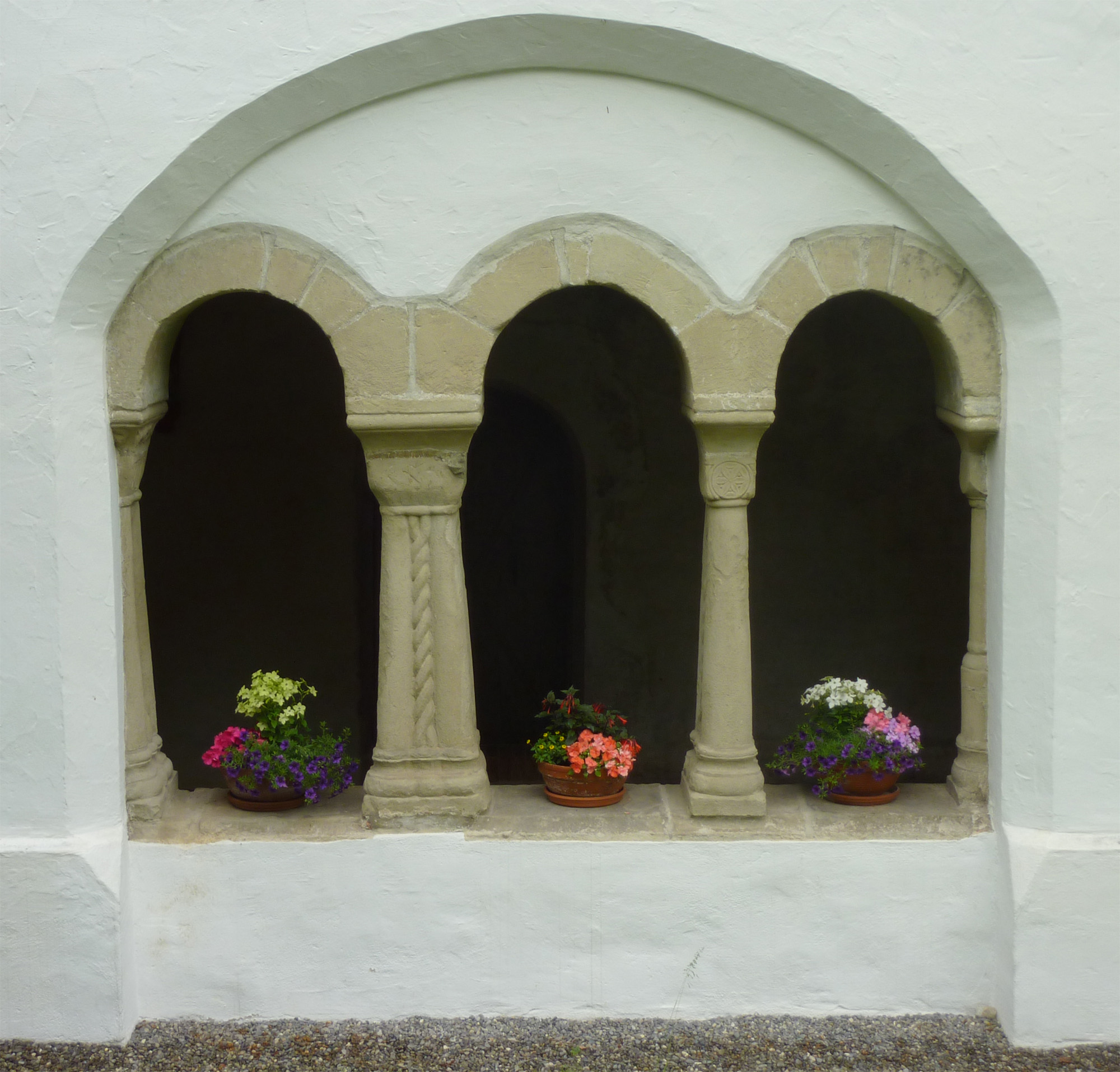
Arcade in the cloister

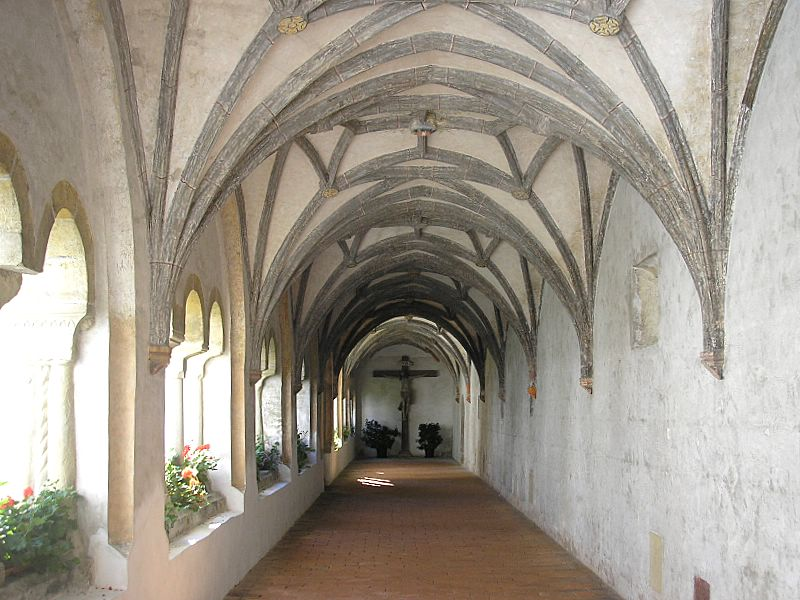
West cloister wing (inside)

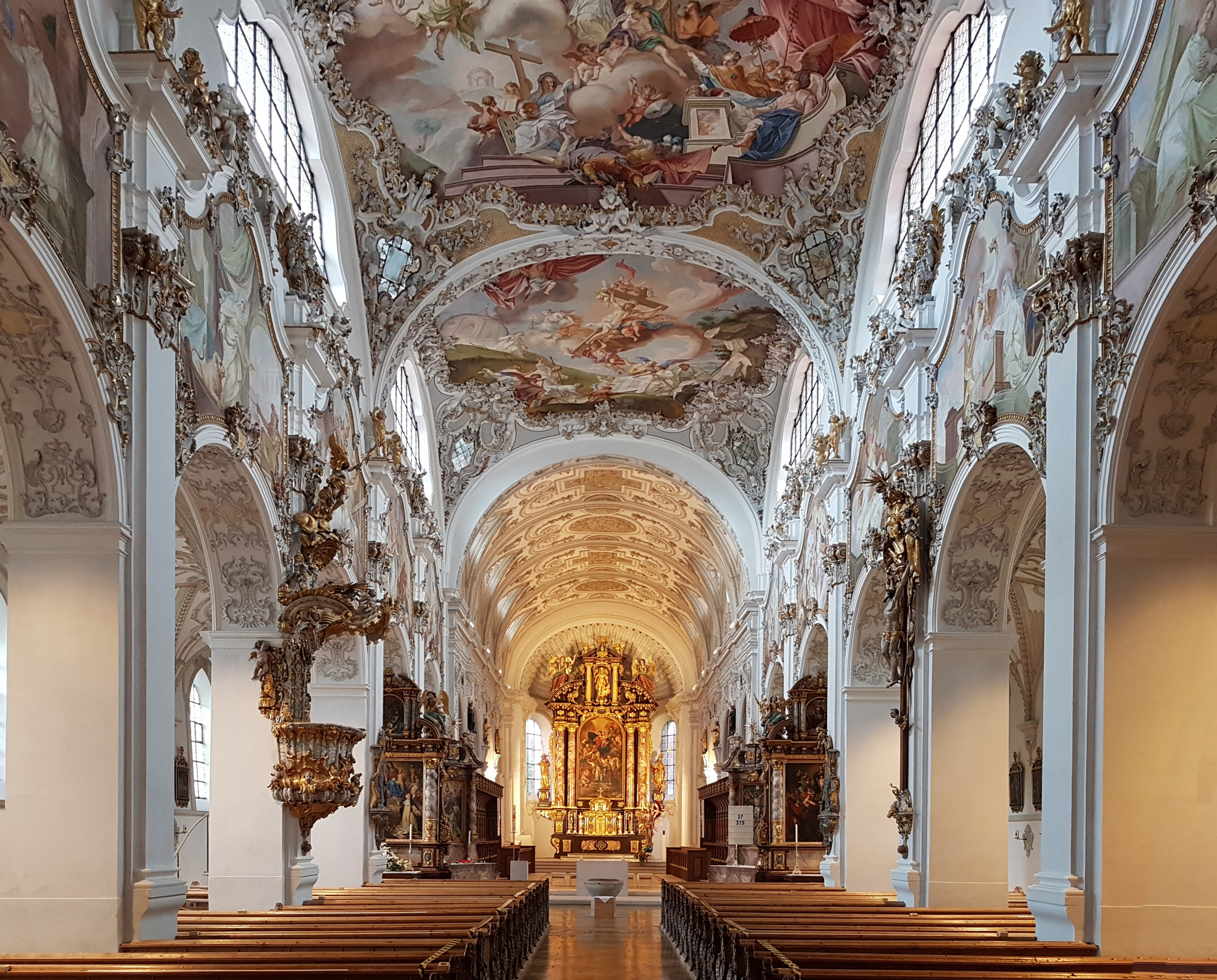
Rococo-styled Romanesque nave

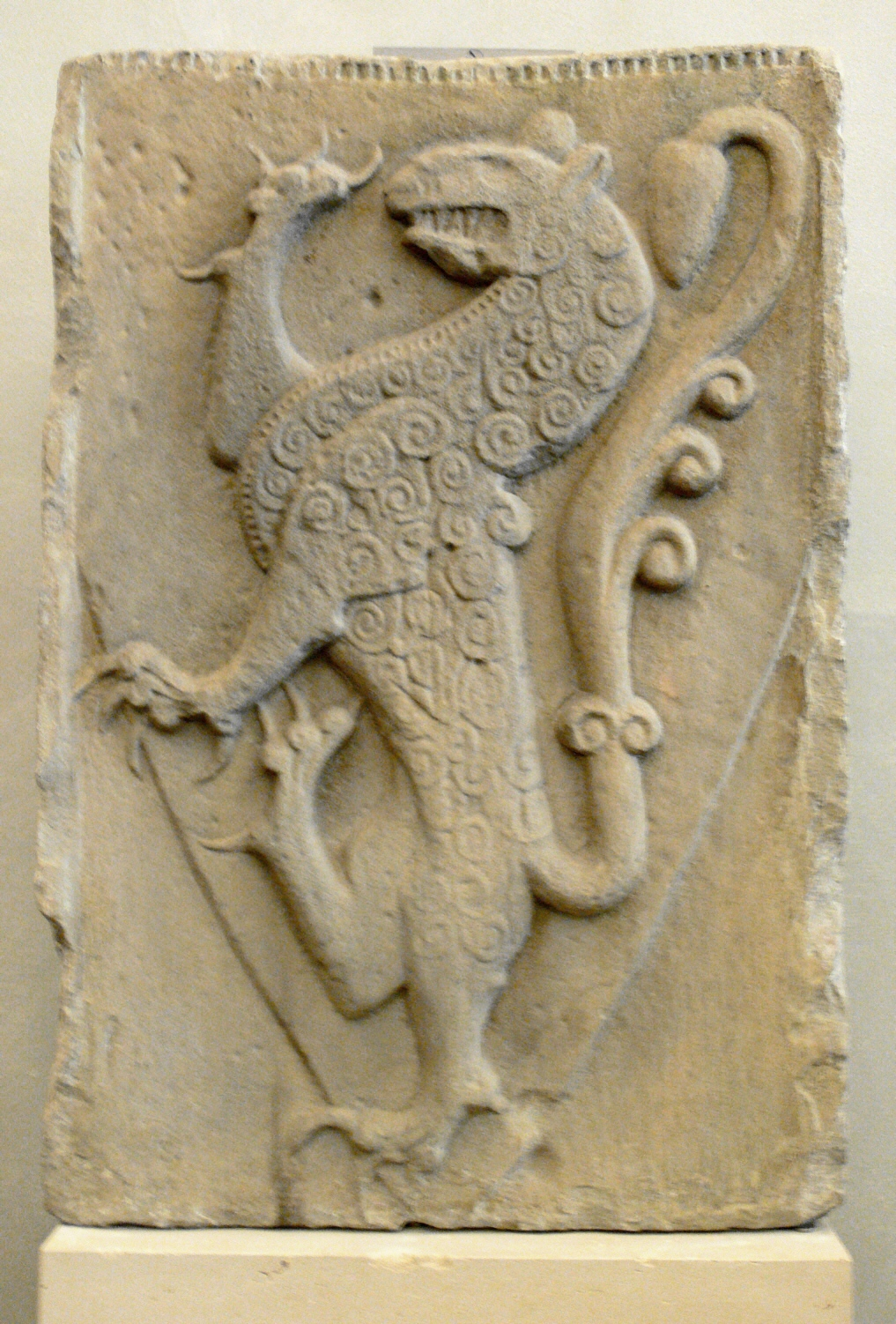
Funerary monument for Welf VI (d. 1191) and his pre-deceased son Welf VII. Today exhibited in the Bavarian National Museum, Munich

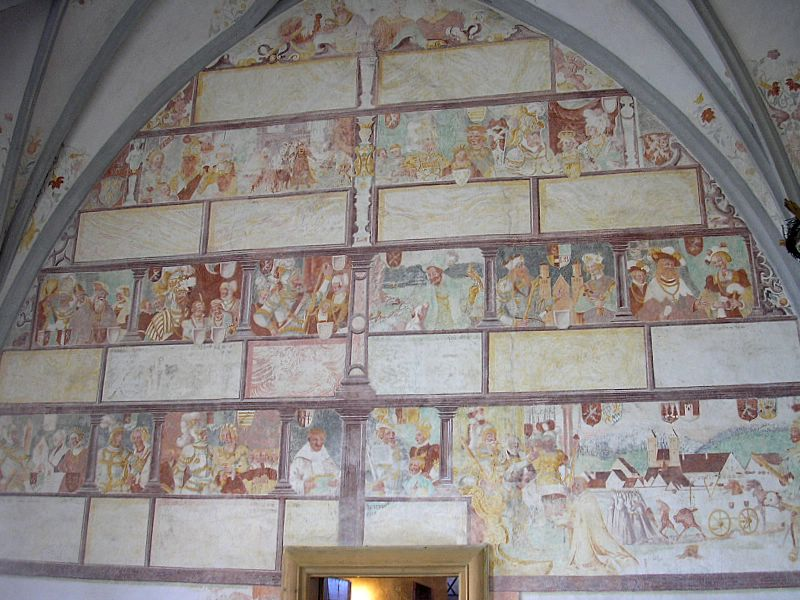
Genealogy of the House of Welf

== Wies Church ==
The nearby pilgrimage church at Wies was closely connected to Steingaden Abbey. It was built under Abbot Marinus Mayer in 1745 when it became apparent that Wies had become an important centre of pilgrimage, and has continued ever since as one of the most popular pilgrimage churches in Bavaria.
