= Welf VII =

German noble (c. 1135–1167)

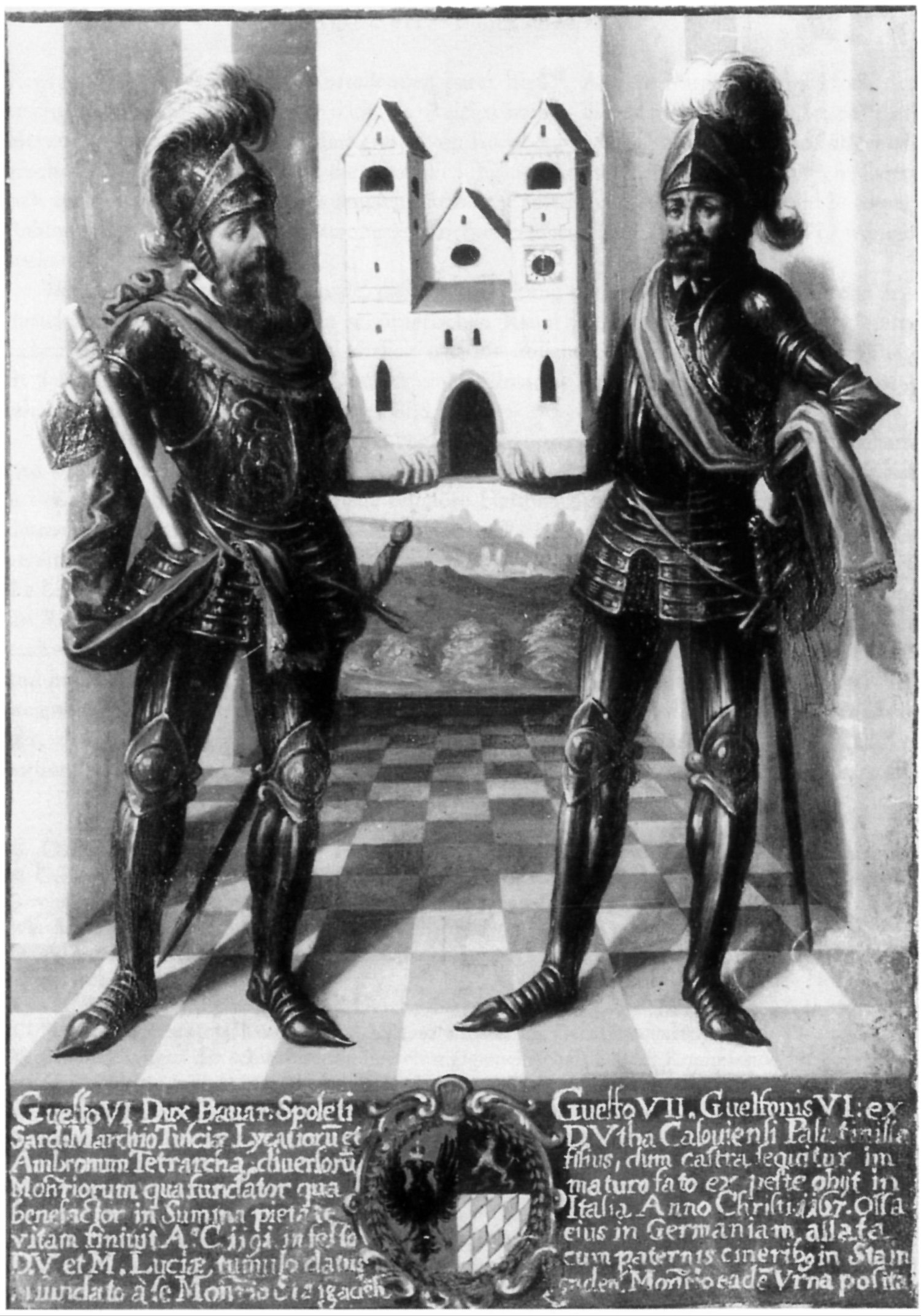
Welf VI and Welf VII from Steingaden Abbey.

Welf VII (c. 1135 – 11 or 12 September 1167) was the only son of Welf VI, Duke of Spoleto and Margrave of Tuscany, and Uta, daughter of Godfrey of Calw, count palatine of the Rhine. He was a member of the House of Welf.

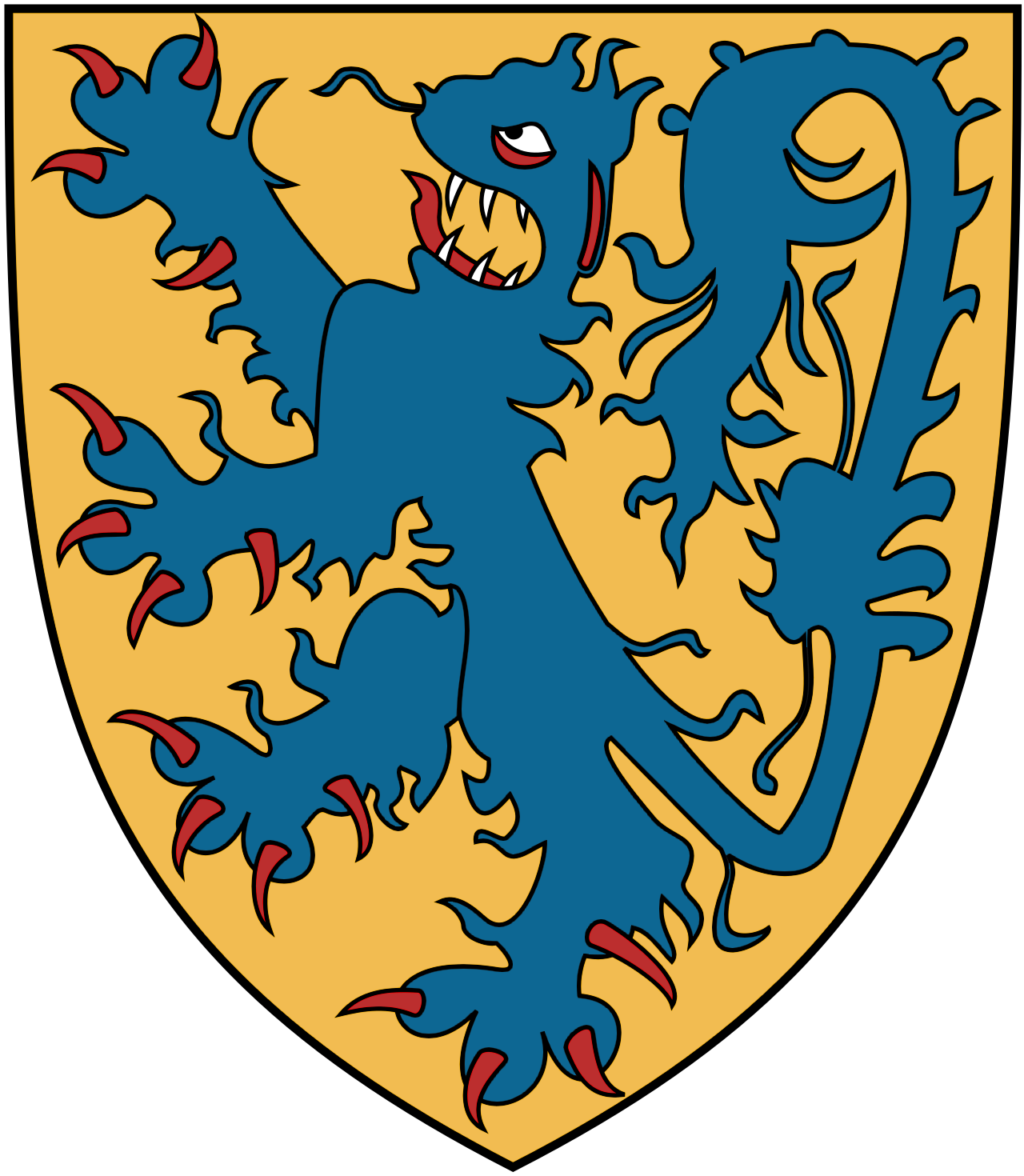
The ancient arms of the House of Welf: Or a lion azure rampant

His father inherited the family's estates in Swabia, including the prominent counties of Altdorf and Ravensburg, which he gave to Welf. Welf, however, spent much of his time managing the Italian possessions while his father stayed in Swabia. Both Welfs supported Frederick Barbarossa as king of Germany and the younger Welf (VII) accompanied him on his Italian campaigns, starting in 1154. In 1160, he was made duke of Spoleto by the emperor. Between 1164 and 1166, he was a central theme in the notable Stuafen-Welf feud between his father and Hugh of Tübingen, which the emperor himself resolved.

He was a participant in Frederick I’s campaign against Alexander III in 1167. After the successful siege of Rome, a massive thunderstorm on 2 August swept across the imperial camp and caused massive destruction. A few days later an epidemic broke out among the army. This epidemic has often been identified as malaria, but the swiftness with which the illness spread and the enormous death toll, precludes malaria as a cause. Most likely the epidemic was caused by Shigella dysenteriae. The rapid withdrawal of the army did not stop the spread of the disease. Welf VII died of this illness on 12 September in Siena.

He was buried in Steingaden Abbey in Bavaria, where his father was also later buried. The death of Welf (and Frederick IV) allowed his cousin Frederick I to exercise power directly in Swabia and accept the autonomy of the Lombard communes.

== Sources ==
- Thomas Zotz (Editor), Andreas Schmauder (Editor), Johannes Kuber (Editor). Von Den Welfen Zu Den Staufern: Der Tod Welfs VII 1167 Und Die Grundlegung Oberschwabens Im Mittelalter (From the Guelphs to the Staufers. The Death of Welfs VII 1167 and the Foundation of Upper Swabia in the Middle Ages): Volume 4. Kohlhammer, Stuttgart 2020. ISBN 978-3-17-037334-1.

Italian nobility
Preceded by Welf VI	Margrave of Tuscany; 1160–1167	Succeeded by Welf VI
Preceded by Welf VI	Duke of Spoleto; 1160–1167	Succeeded by Welf VI
