= Sulzbach =

Sulzbach or Sülzbach may refer to:

== France ==
- Sulzbach or Soultzbach-les-Bains, small village in Alsace
- Sulzbach Formation, a geologic formation

== Germany ==
=== Inhabited places ===
- Amberg-Sulzbach, a Landkreis (district) in Bavaria, Germany
- Sulzbach-Rosenberg, a town in the district Amberg-Sulzbach, Bavaria
- Sulzbach, Saarland, a town in the district of Saarbrücken, Saarland
  - Sulzbach (Saar) station, railway station
- Sulzbach, Hesse, a municipality in the Main-Taunus-Kreis, Hesse
- Sulzbach am Main, a municipality in the district of Miltenberg, Bavaria
- Sulzbach an der Murr, a municipality in the Rems-Murr-Kreis, Baden-Württemberg
- Sulzbach-Laufen, a town in the district of Schwäbisch Hall in Baden-Württemberg
- Sulzbach (Billigheim), a district of Billigheim in Baden-Württemberg
- Sulzbach, Birkenfeld, part of the Verbandsgemeinde Rhaunen, district of Birkenfeld, Rhineland-Palatinate
- Sulzbach, Rhein-Lahn, part of the Verbandsgemeinde Nassau, Rhein-Lahn-Kreis, Rhineland-Palatinate
- Herren-Sulzbach, part of the Verbandsgemeinde Lauterecken-Wolfstein, Kusel district, Rhineland-Palatinate
- Kirn-Sulzbach, a district of Kirn in the district of Bad Kreuznach, Rhineland-Palatinate
- Sülzbach, a district of Obersulm, Baden-Württemberg

=== Rivers ===
- Sulzbach (Main), a river of Bavaria, tributary of the Main
- Sulzbach (Nidda). a river of Hesse, tributary of the Nidda
- Sulzbach (Rhine), a river of Baden-Württemberg, tributary of the Rhine
- Sulzbach (Rott), a river of Bavaria, tributary of the Rott
- Sülzbach (Sulm), a river of Baden-Württemberg, tributary of the Sulm

=== States ===
- Palatinate-Sulzbach, the name of two separate states of the Holy Roman Empire
- Palatinate-Sulzbach-Hilpoltstein, a state of the Holy Roman Empire

== Slovenia ==
- Solčava, a town in the northern Slovenia, historically known as Sulzbach

== Switzerland ==
- Sulzbach, Appenzell Innerrhoden, part of the Oberegg District in the canton of Appenzell-Innerrhoden
- Sulzbach, Glarus, a hamlet in the village of Elm in the canton of Glarus

== People ==
- Berengar II of Sulzbach (c. 1080–1125)
- Gertrude of Sulzbach (c. 1110–1146), German queen
- Bertha of Sulzbach (c. 1110–1159), Byzantine Empress
- Matilda of Sulzbach (died 1165), Margravine of Istria
- Gebhard III of Sulzbach (c. 1140–1188)
- Otto Henry, Count Palatine of Sulzbach (1556–1604)
- Augustus, Count Palatine of Sulzbach (1582–1632)
- Johann Friedrich, Count Palatine of Sulzbach-Hilpoltstein (1587–1644)
- Christian Augustus, Count Palatine of Sulzbach (1622–1708)
- Hedwig of the Palatinate-Sulzbach (1650–1681)
- Theodore Eustace, Count Palatine of Sulzbach (1659–1732)
- Count Palatine Joseph Charles of Sulzbach (1694–1729)
- Countess Palatine Ernestine of Sulzbach (1697–1775)
- John Christian, Count Palatine of Sulzbach (1700–1733)
- Anne Christine of Sulzbach, Princess of Piedmont (1704–1723)
- Countess Palatine Elisabeth Auguste of Sulzbach (1721–1794)
- Countess Palatine Maria Franziska of Sulzbach (1724–1794)
- Jonas Sulzbach (born 1986), Brazilian model
