= Gertrude of Sulzbach =

Queen of Germany from 1138 to 1146

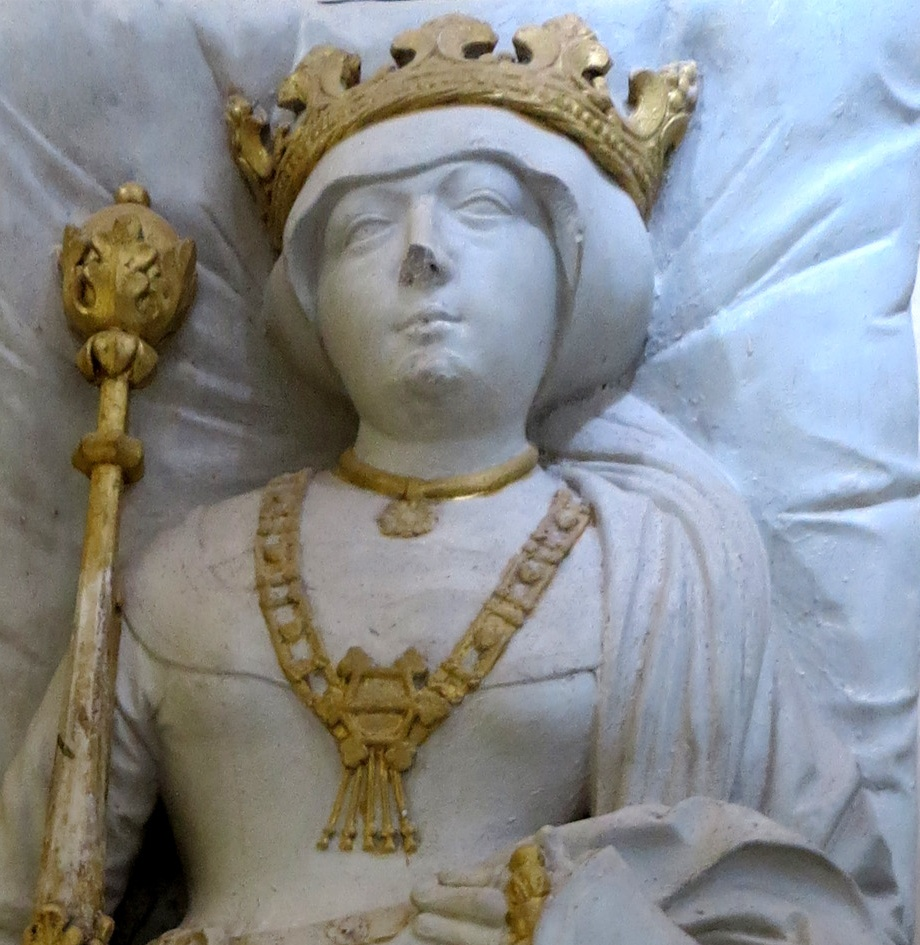
- Effigy, Ebrach Abbey Church

Queen consort of Germany
- Tenure: 7 March 1138 – 14 April 1146
- Born: c. 1110; Sulzbach Castle, Bavaria
- Died: 14 April 1146 (aged 35–36); Hersfeld Abbey, Franconia
- Burial: Ebrach Abbey
- Spouse: Conrad III of Germany
- Issue: Henry Berengar; Frederick IV, Duke of Swabia
- Father: Berengar II of Sulzbach
- Mother: Adelheid of Wolfratshausen

Gertrude of Sulzbach (German: Gertrud; c. 1110 – 14 April 1146) was German queen from 1138 until her death as the second wife of the Hohenstaufen king Conrad III.

== Life ==
She was the daughter of the Bavarian count Berengar II of Sulzbach (c.1080–1125) and Adelheid of Wolfratshausen (d. 1126).

The identity of Gertrude's mother is mentioned in the Kastler Reimchronik, Vers 525. Adelheid of Wolfratshausen is mentioned in various other documents of the 12th century as "Countess of Sulzbach", without mentioning her husband. De Fundatoribus Monasterii Diessenses contains a rather confused genealogy concerning her two most prominent daughters. Otto II, Count of Wolfratshausen, father of Adelheid, is given as father to Richenza of Northeim, "Empress" and "Maria, Empress of the Greeks". Richenza was actually the wife of Lothair II. The author of the text had apparently confused her with Gertrude von Sulzbach. Maria is probably a confusion for "Irene", the baptismal name of Gertrude's sister Bertha of Sulzbach, wife of the Roman Emperor Manuel I Komnenos. Both were granddaughters of Otto and children of Count Berengar and Adelheid.

At the time of Gertrude's birth, in 1111, Count Berengar II was among the nobles attending the coronation of the last Salian emperor Henry V. He is mentioned among the sureties of documents related to the coronation. In 1120, Berengar is recorded granting a donation to the Prince-Bishopric of Bamberg. He is mentioned as co-founder of Kastl Abbey about 1103 and as the founder of the Berchtesgaden monastery on behalf of his late mother in 1101–02, as well as of Baumburg Abbey about 1107–09. On 23 December 1122, he was one of the German nobles who signed the Concordat of Worms between Emperor Henry V and Pope Callixtus II. In August 1125, Berengar is mentioned in documents of Henry's successor King Lothair II of Germany; his death is documented four months later.

=== Queen consort of Germany ===
Gertrude married Conrad of Hohenstaufen, son of late Duke Frederick of Swabia, in 1136. While Conrad's elder brother Frederick II had succeeded their father as Duke of Swabia, he himself was elected German anti-king in 1127, but had to witness the coronation of his rival Lothair II as Holy Roman Emperor in 1133. Conrad finally submitted in 1135; the next year he joined the emperor on his Italian campaign and married Gertrude. The matrimonial alliance between the House of Hohenstaufen and the Counts of Sulzbach led to close relations between the two families; when in Gertrude's brother Count Gebhard III died, the line became extinct, leaving the Hohenstaufen emperor Frederick I Barbarossa (Gertrude's nephew by marriage) as his sole heir.

After Emperor Lothair II died in 1137, Gertrude's husband Conrad finally was elected King of the Romans on 7 March 1138, though he had to ward off the claims raised by the rivalling Welf duke Henry X of Bavaria and his sons Henry the Lion and Welf VI. To secure the Hohenstaufen rule, Conrad had the princes elect his son Henry Berengar, then ten years old, as co-King of Germany at an Imperial diet held in Regensburg on 13 March 1147. Overall King Conrad relied in a great extent to the relatives of his wife Gertrude for support.

Gertrude died in 1146 at Hersfeld Abbey, as she became ill after the birth of her second son Frederick. She was 36 years old, and was buried in the church of the former Cistercian monastery of Ebrach, right next to her younger son.

== Issue ==
Gertrude had two children:

- Henry Berengar (1136 or 1137 – 1150), who in March 1147 was proclaimed co-king by his father, being crowned on 30 March 1147 in Aachen
- Frederick of Rothenburg (1145–1167), Duke of Swabia from 1152, married 1166 Gertrude of Bavaria (d. 1196), daughter of Henry the Lion, Duke of Bavaria and Saxony.

== Notes ==
Preceded by Gertrude of Comburg	Queen consort of Germany; 1138–1146	Succeeded by Adelaide of Vohburg
