= Gebhard III of Sulzbach =

- Born: c 1114
- Died: 28 October 1188
- Occupation: Knight

Count Gebhard III of Sulzbach (also: Gebhard II of Sulzbach; born around 1114; † 28. October 1188) came from the noble Counts of Sulzbach and was a son of Count Berengar II of Sulzbach and his second wife, Adelheid of Dießen-Wolfratshausen.

After his father's death he was appointed to the County of Sulzbach in 1125 and was next to that, inter alia, Count of Floß as well as Margrave from 1146 to 1149. He probably married Mathilda on 24 October 1129, a daughter of Henry IX, Duke of Bavaria (also called Henry the Black), with whom he had five children with and died on 16 March 1183.

After the death of his sister Matilda of Sulzbach in 1165, Gebhard agreed with her widower Engelberg III, Count of Kraiburg & Margrave of Istria on 22 December 1165 in term of their extensive inheritance in Chiemgau. He was also the heir after 1144 to the castle of Warburg.

As Count of Sulzbach, Gebhard was also in the service of the Hohenstaufens and equally rivals of the Diepolding-Rapoto families in Nordgau, which as Margraves of Cham and Nabburg were henchmen of the Salians.

Gebhard was not only the Vogt of Berchtesgaden, but also the Vogt of the Regensburg cathedral, Vogt of Niedermünster and of Passau-Niedernburg.

Gebhard survived all his children. With his death in 1188, the noble lineage of the Counts of Sulzbach died out "in the male line", since his only son Berengar II died childless.

== Family ==
Gebhard had 5 children with his wife Matilda:

- Berengar III († August 21, 1167), Count of Sulzbach 1156-1167
- Adelheid ∞ Dietrich II († 1172), Count of Kleve
- Sophie, heiress of Gebhard III ∞ Gerhard I of Hirschberg († 1170)
- Elisabeth ∞ 1163 Count Rapoto I of Ortenburg († August 26, 1186), from the house of Spanheimer, Count of Murach, Count of Kraiburg and Marquartstein
- Bertha († after 1200) ∞ 1173 Henry II of Altendorf († 1194)

== Literature ==
- Jürgen Dendorfer: Die Grafen von Sulzbach, Originalbeitrag erschienen in: Ferdinand Kramer u. Wilhelm Störmer (Hrsg.): Hochmittelalterliche Adelsfamilien in Altbayern, Franken und Schwaben (Studien zur bayerischen verfassungs- und Sozialgeschichte 20), Kommission für bayerische Landesgeschichte, München 2005, S. 179-212, als PDF-Datei mit 35 Seiten.
