= Henry Berengar =

12th century German prince

Henry Berengar (1136/7–1150), sometimes numbered Henry (VI), was the eldest son of Conrad III of Germany and his second wife, Gertrude of Sulzbach. He was named after his father's maternal grandfather, Emperor Henry IV, and his mother's father, Count Berengar II of Sulzbach. He was groomed for the succession, but predeceased his father.

In 1139, Henry was betrothed to Sophia, daughter of King Béla II of Hungary. She moved to Germany to learn German language and court culture, but relations between Germany and Hungary cooled after the death of her father in 1141. The marriage was cancelled while Sophia was still residing in Germany. After several letters to her brother, King Géza II, she received permission to remain in the German monastery where she had been living. Conrad and Henry likewise approved. Henry witnessed for the first time a diploma issued by his father in 1142. He witnessed two more before his coronation.

Conrad had the princes elect Henry, then ten years old, as co-king of Germany at a diet in Regensburg on 13 March 1147, before Conrad left on the Second Crusade. Henry was anointed and crowned on Laetare Sunday (30 March) in Aachen. During his father's absence on crusade (June 1147–May 1149), he was placed under the tutorship of the powerful abbot Wibald and the notary Heinrich von Wiesenbach. For his services, Heinrich was raised to the rank of master (magister) or protonotary (protonotarius). Nine letters (eight in full) written by or for Henry survive from this period of his reign, but no diplomas do.

The young Henry was the winning general at the Battle of Flochberg (1150) against Welf VI and Welf VII. The military prowess of the young ruler was emphasised in letters (dated the week of 16–20 April 1150 at Würzburg) to the Byzantine emperor, Manuel I, and the empress, Irene, Gertrude's sister, informing them of the victory. Henry died later that year and was buried at the monastery of Lorch.

== Sources ==
- Bumke, Joachim (1991). Courtly Culture: Literature and Society in the High Middle Ages. Berkeley: University of California Press. ISBN 9780520066342.
- Dale, Johanna (2016). "Inauguration and Political Liturgy in the Hohenstaufen Empire, 1138–1215". German History. 34 (2): 191–213. doi:10.1093/gerhis/ghw014.
- Decker-Hauff, Hansmartin [in German] (1977). "Das Staufische Haus". In Reiner Haussherr (ed.). Die Zeit der Staufer: Geschichte, Kunst, Kultur. Vol. 3. Stuttgart. pp. 339–374.
- Fuhrmann, Horst (1986). Germany in the High Middle Ages: c.1050–1200. Translated by Timothy Reuter. Cambridge: Cambridge University Press.
- Hausmann, Friedrich, ed. (1969). "Die Urkunden Konrads III. und seines Sohnes Heinrich [Conradi III. et filii eius Heinrici Diplomata]". Monumenta Germaniae Historica. Vol. 21. Vienna.
- Lyon, Jonathan R. (2013). Princely Brothers and Sisters: The Sibling Bond in German Politics, 1100–1250. Ithaca and London: Cornell University Press.
- Reuter, Timothy (2001). "The 'Non-Crusade' of 1149–50". In Phillips, Jonathan; Hoch, Martin (eds.). The Second Crusade: Scope and Consequences. Manchester: Manchester University Press. pp. 150–63.
- Waitz, Georg, ed. (1879). "Annales Aquenses". Monumenta Germaniae Historica. Scriptores. Vol. 24. Hanover. pp. 33–39.
- Ward, Emily Joan (2022). Royal Childhood and Child Kingship: Boy Kings in England, Scotland, France and Germany, c. 1050–1262. Cambridge University Press.

Preceded by Conrad III	King of Germany with Conrad III; 30 March 1147 – 1150	Succeeded by Conrad III
