= Gertrude of Comburg =

12th-century Queen of Germany

Queen consort of Germany (in opposition)
- Tenure: 1127–1130/1131
- Died: 1130/1131
- Spouse: Conrad III of Germany
Names
- Gertrude of Comburg
- Father: Henry, Count of Rothenburg
- Mother: Gepa of Mergentheim

Gertrude of Comburg (died 1130/1131) was the first queen consort of Conrad III of Germany. She was a daughter of Henry, Count of Rothenburg, and Gepa of Mergentheim.

== Marriage ==
Her marriage to Conrad of Swabia is estimated to have occurred c. 1115. Her new husband was the second son of Frederick I, Duke of Swabia and Agnes of Germany. He was a younger brother of Frederick II, Duke of Swabia.

In 1115, Conrad was appointed Duke of Franconia by his maternal uncle Henry V, Holy Roman Emperor. Henry V died on 23 May 1125, and Conrad was an eligible candidate for the throne. However, Conrad supported his older brother Frederick II in the election for the new King of the Romans. The election was instead won by Lothair III.

Conrad and Frederick II had inherited the private lands of their deceased maternal uncle Henry V, but also pressed a claim to lands gained by the crown during his reign. Lothair III also claimed the lands as the new King. Their conflict resulted in Conrad being elected King of Germany in opposition to Lothair in 1127. Gertrud became his Queen consort. The conflict was still ongoing at the time of her death.

== Children ==
Gertrud and Conrad III had at least two daughters whose names are; Bertha (recorded as abbess of Erstein in 1153) and Gertrud. Another daughter (probably named Agnes), who died in 1151, married Iziaslav II of Kiev.

Conrad III had other children: two by his second wife Gertrude of Sulzbach (Heinrich-Berengar and Friedrich IV of Swabia) and five with a mistress called Gerberga (Leopold, Konstantin von Lochgarten, Giselbert von Hotingen, Sophia, who married Konrad von Pfitzingen, and Ludmilla von Vellberg).

Royal titles
Preceded by Richenza of Northeim	Queen consort of Germany (in opposition); 1127–1130/1131	Succeeded by Gertrude of Sulzbach
