= Adelheid of Wolfratshausen =

Wife of Berengar II, Count of Sulzbach (died 1126)

Adelheid of Wolfratshausen (d. 11 January/12 January 1126) was a countess of Sulzbach as the second wife of Berengar II, Count of Sulzbach. Slightly different dates for her death are given in the necrologies of Tegernsee and the Salzburg Cathedral.

== Life ==
Adelheid was a daughter of Otto II, Count of Wolfratshausen and his wife Justizia. Otto was created Count between 1098 and 1116. He was also Count of Thaining (c. 1073), Count of Ambras (c. 1078) and Count of Diessen (c. 1100). The family name of her mother is not attested in primary sources. Theories suggest Justizia was a member of the House of Babenberg. They are based on the transmission of the first name "Luitpold", previously used by the Babenberg, which was used by several of Justizia's descendants.

Adelheid married Berengar II, Count of Sulzbach.

== Issue ==
She had six known children:

- Gebhard III, Count of Sulzbach (d. 28 October 1188), married Mathilde of Bavaria, a daughter of Henry IX, Duke of Bavaria. Ancestor of later Counts of Sulzbach.
- Adelheid of Sulzbach, Abbess of Niedernburg in Passau.
- Gertrude von Sulzbach (c. 1114 - 14 April 1146). Married Conrad III of Germany.
- Bertha of Sulzbach (1110s - 29 August 1159). Married Manuel I Komnenos, Byzantine Emperor.
- Luitgarde of Sulzbach. Married first Godfrey II of Leuven and secondly Hugo XII, Count of Dagsburg and Metz.
- Matilda of Sulzbach (d. October/November, 1165). Married Engelbert III, Margrave of Istria.

== Sources ==
- Schnith, Karl Rudolf (1990). Mittelalterliche Herrscher in Lebensbildern: von den Karolingern zu den Staufern (in German). Styria.
- Ziegler, Wolfram (2008). König Konrad III. (1138–1152): Hof, Urkunden und Politik (in German). Bohlau Verlag Wien.
