= Engelbert III of Istria =

Austrian noble (died 1173)

Engelbert III (Note: He is sometimes numbered Engelbert II of Istria, but in fact must be II of Carniola.) (died 6 October 1173), a member of the Rhenish Franconian House of Sponheim, was Margrave of Istria from 1124 until his death.

Engelbert was the second son of Margrave Engelbert II and his first wife Uta of Passau. When his father succeeded his elder brother Henry as duke of Carinthia, Engelbert III received the margravial title in Istria. However, he mainly ruled in the Sponheim estates around Kraiburg in Bavaria, bequested by his mother.

In 1135 Emperor Lothair III dispatched him to a synod at Pisa in Italy, in order to back Innocent II as pope against Anacletus II. In turn, Engelbert was vested with the Imperial March of Tuscany, but was succeeded by Duke Henry X of Bavaria already in 1137. Engelbert attended the 1156 Imperial Diet in Regensburg, where he witnessed the granting of the Privilegium Minus by Emperor Frederick Barbarossa, elevating the March of Austria to a duchy.

In 1140, Engelbert married Matilda, youngest daughter of Count Berengar II of Sulzbach. He was thus a brother-in-law of King Conrad III of Germany and the Byzantine Emperor Manuel I Komnenos. Matilda died late in 1165. The marriage had remained childless. The margravial title in Istria passed to the Bavarian counts of Andechs.

His son Pellegrino was Patriarch of Aquileia in northern Italy from 1195 to 1204.

== Sources ==
- Loud, Graham A.; Schenk, Jochen, eds. (2017). The Origins of the German Principalities, 1100-1350: Essays by German Historians. Routledge.
- Williams, Watkin (1935). Saint Bernard of Clairvaux. Manchester University Press.

Preceded by Engelbert II	Margrave of Istria; 1124–1173	Succeeded by Berthold I
Preceded by Conrad	Margrave of Tuscany; 1135–1137	Succeeded by Henry
