= Höglwörth Abbey =

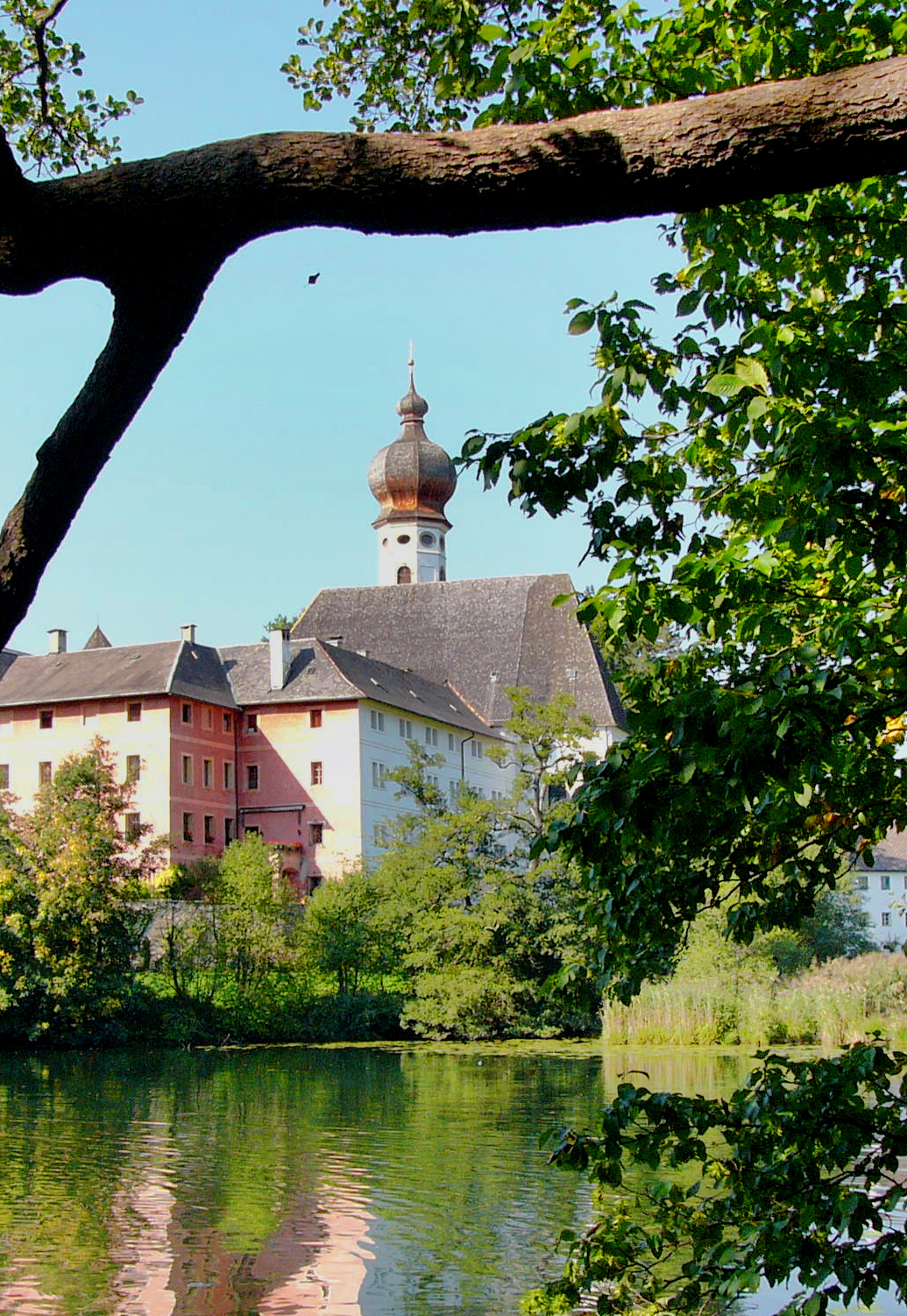
- Kloster Högelwörth near Anger, Bavaria, Germany

- Location within Bavaria
- Interactive map of Höglwörth Abbey

Site
- Coordinates: 47.815318°N 12.845919°E

Höglwörth Abbey (German: Kloster Höglwörth) is a former monastery of the Augustinian Canons in Höglwörth, near Anger in Bavaria, in the Archdiocese of Munich and Freising.

== History ==
The Augustinian monastery dedicated to St. Peter and Paul was founded in 1125 by Archbishop Conrad I of Salzburg. It was the only monastery saved from the secularization of Bavaria (1802 and 1803), until Rupertiwinkel became part of the Kingdom of Bavaria in 1816. The last provost Gilbert Grab sought relief from secularization from 1813, but this was not granted until 1816 by the King of Bavaria. On 30 July 1817 it was formally given independence as a privately owned monastery.

The monastery with its rococo church on a peninsula in Lake Höglwörth represents one of the finest ensembles in the eastern Upper Bavaria. The church was rebuilt from 1675. The choir was preserved from the Romanesque church. Before silting to the east the monastery was on an island, but it is now on a peninsula. Wörth is an old word for island, and it is still shown as an island on the field map from the 19th century.

== Abbots ==
Provosts, where known, include:

- 1522–1541 Provost and Prelate Wolfgang II Griesstätter zu Haslach, at the same time 1531–1539 Administrator of the Baumburg Abbey, and then provost and Prince Provost of Berchtesgaden Abbey.
- 1609–1634 Marquard von Schwendi, also canon in Salzburg, Augsburg and Passau, and only rarely in Höglwörth.
- 1652–1671 Wolfgang Zehentner.
- 1671–? Adam Weber,
- Patritius Pichler, under him the new collegiate church was built and consecrated in 1690.
- Johann Puechner.
- 1804–1817 Gilbert Grab.

== Gallery ==
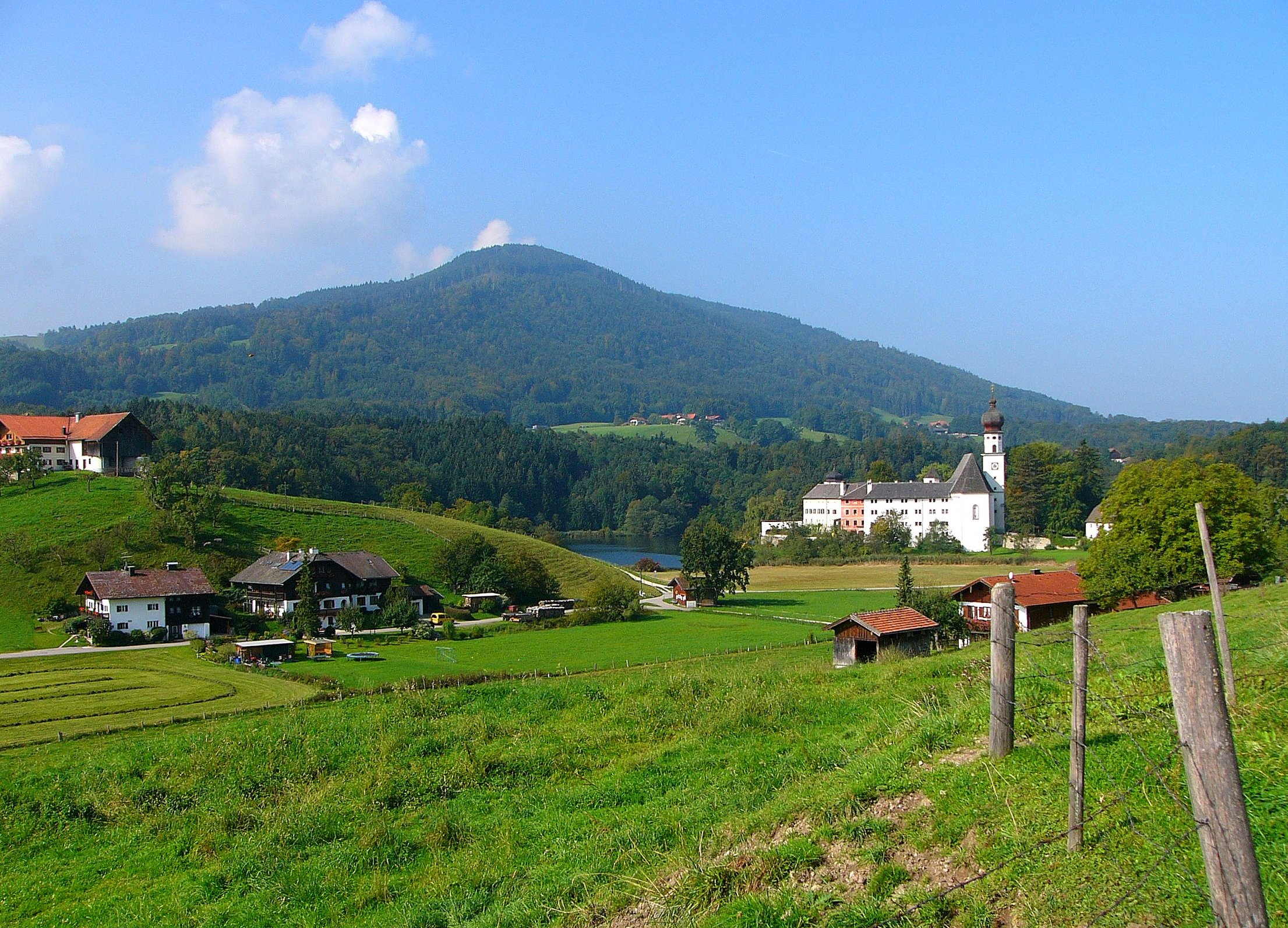

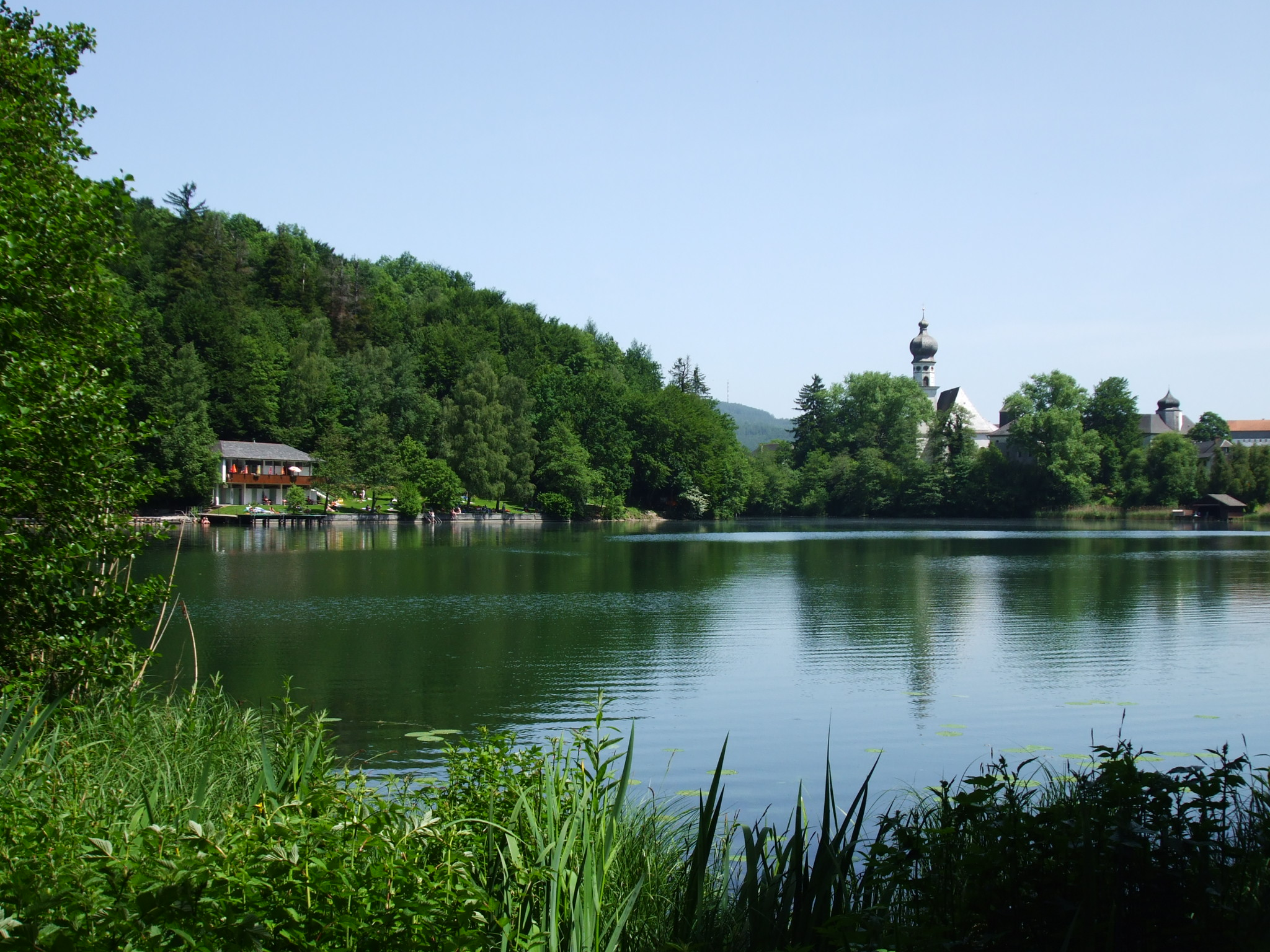

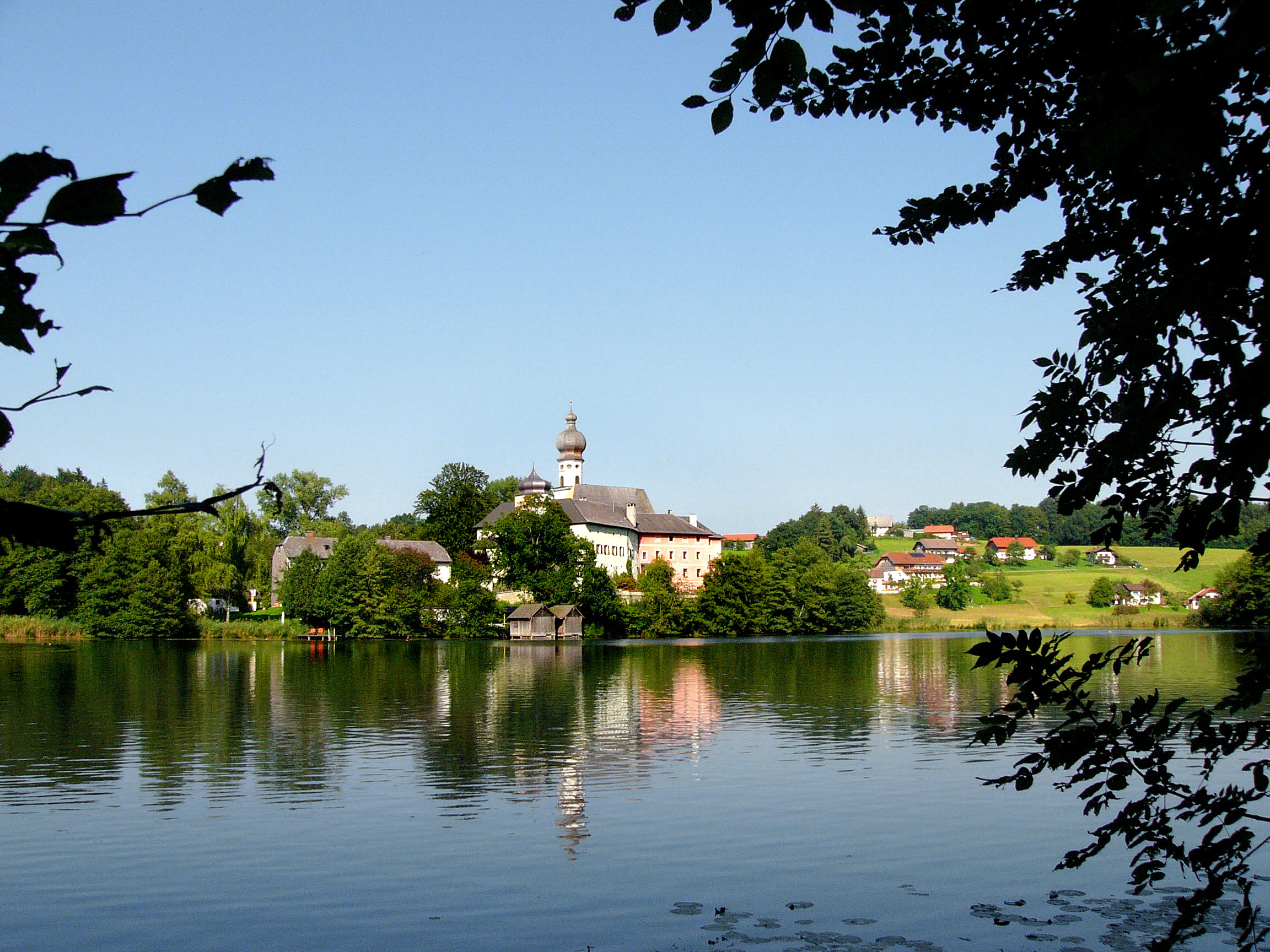

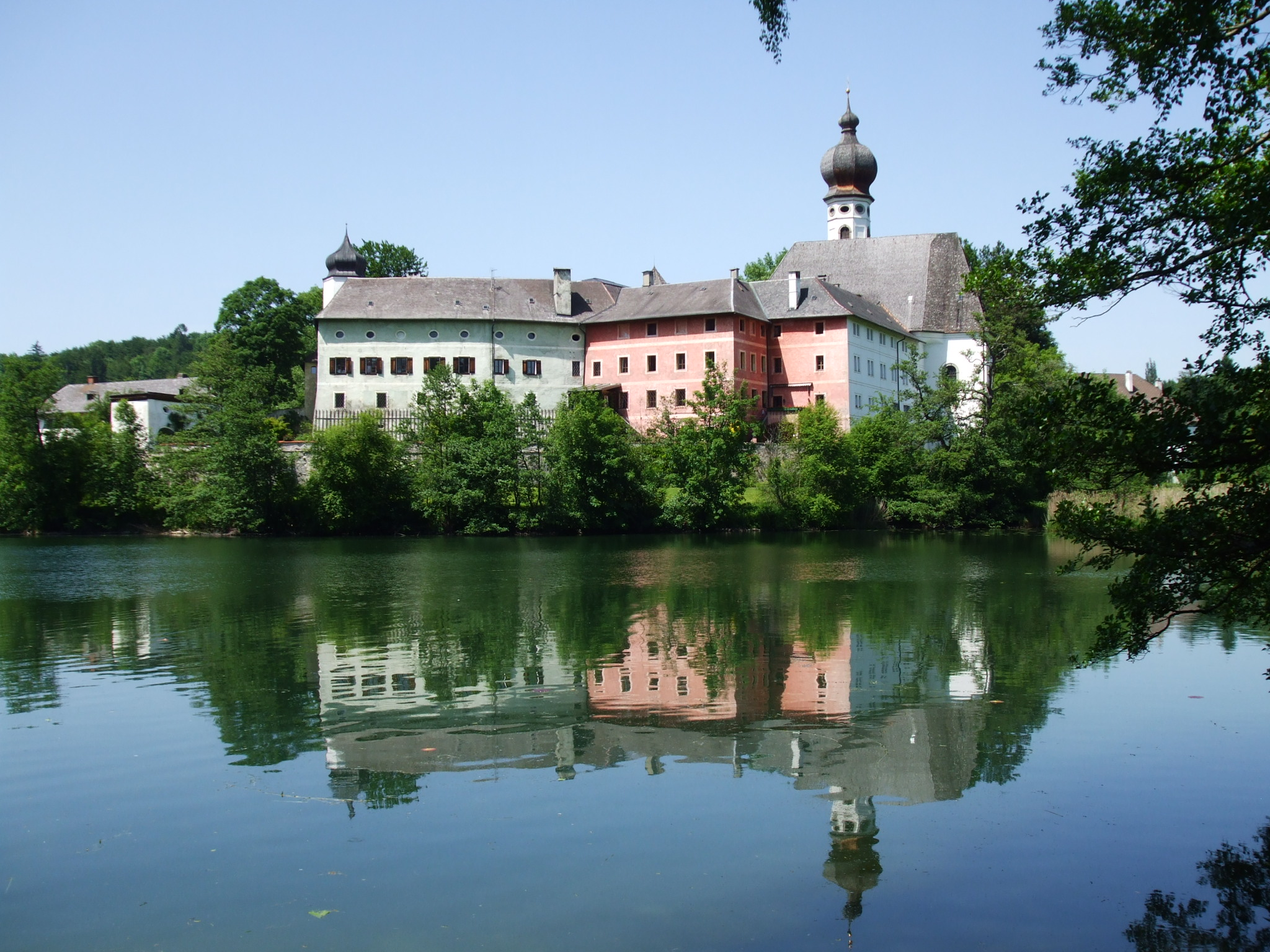
