= Höglwörther See =

Lake in Germany

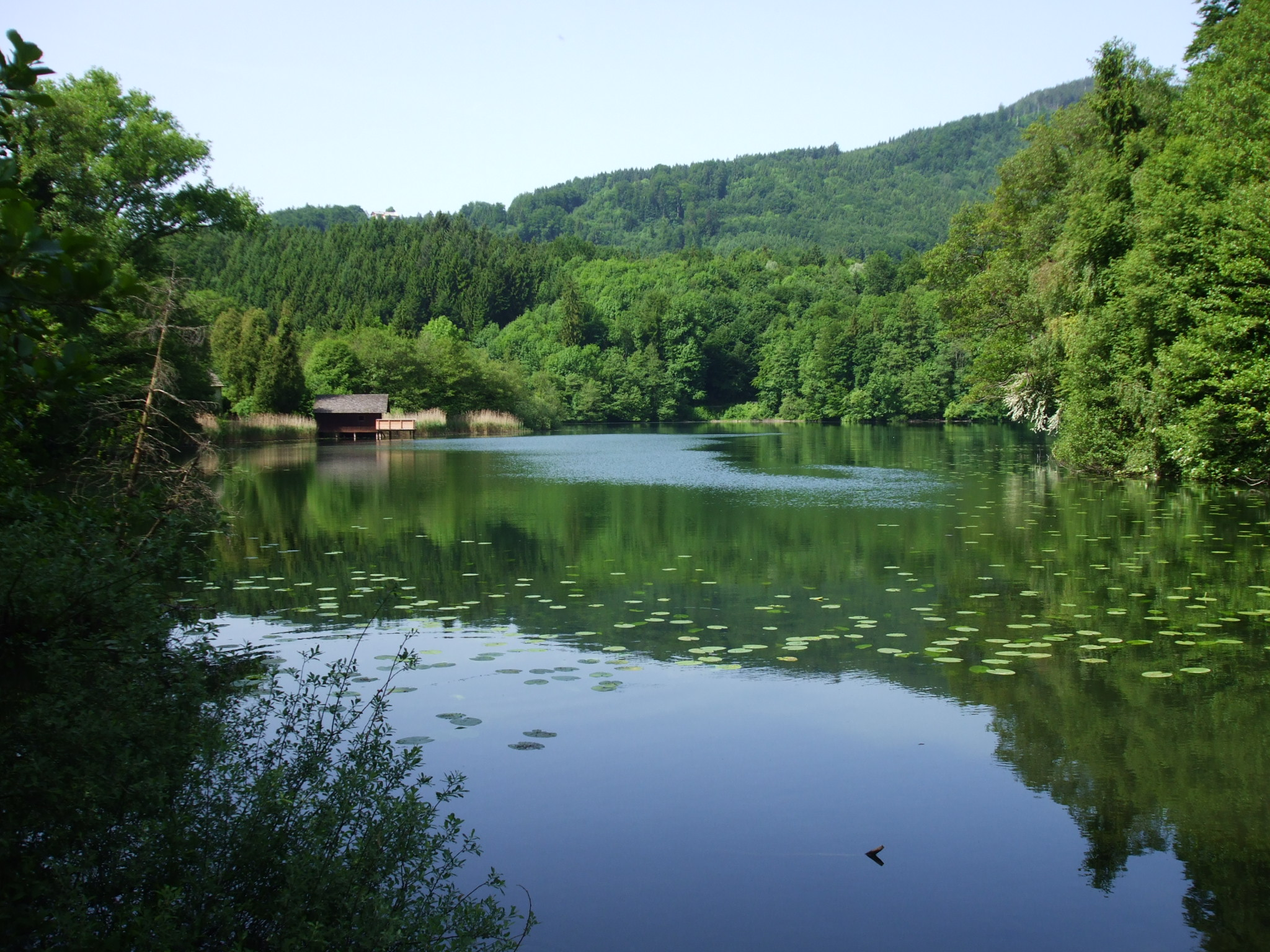

- Location within Bavaria
- Location: Bavaria
- Coordinates: 47°45′57″N 12°50′34″E
- Basin countries: Germany
- Surface area: 13.5 ha (33 acres)
- Average depth: 8 m (26 ft)
- Max. depth: 10 m (33 ft)
- Surface elevation: 540 m (1,770 ft)
- Settlements: Höglwörth

Höglwörther See is a lake in Bavaria, Germany. At an elevation of 540 metres (1,770 ft). It has a surface area of 13.5 hectares (33 acres). The Höglwörth Abbey was founded in 1125 on an island in the lake, now a peninsula due to silting.
