= Conrad I of Salzburg =

12th-century archbishop of Salzburg

Conrad I
- Archbishop of Salzburg
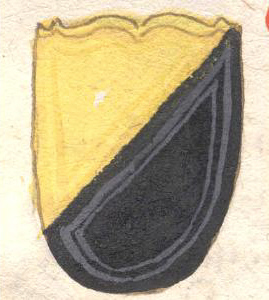
- Coat of Arms of the archbishops of Salzburg
- Installed: 1106
- Term ended: 1147
- Predecessor: Thiemo
- Successor: Eberhard

Personal details
- Born: Konrad von Abenberg c. 1075
- Died: 9 April 1147 Lungau, Salzburg

Conrad I [of Abenberg] (German: Konrad von Abenberg, c. 1075 – 9 April 1147) was Archbishop of Salzburg, Austria, in the first half of the 12th century.

Born into the Abenberg-Frensdorf nobility, Conrad was raised for a clerical career at the court of Emperor Henry IV, where he was a member of the court chapel. He became a canon in Hildesheim. After escorting Emperor Henry V in July 1110, Conrad sided with the Pope in the Investiture Controversy, which eventually led to his exile for several years. He returned to Salzburg in 1121 and played an important role in the major political events of the day, including the election of Lothair of Supplinburg as King of Germany in 1125 and the papal schism of 1130 in which he played a role in the recognition of Pope Innocent II by the king.

During the absence of Lothair of Supplinburg in Italy, Conrad was ordained as the archbishop of Salzburg on 4 June 1133. As a prince-bishop, he was influential in German politics and was an extremely energetic reformer who is often called "the second founder of the Church of Salzburg." He presided over an assembly that supervised the affairs of the religious houses, maintained strong control over tithes, and was responsible for building Salzburg Cathedral and the cemetery in 1140. Conrad also supervised the construction of numerous other monasteries and the castles of Hohensalzburg, Werfen, and Friesach.

== Early life and work ==
Conrad of Abenberg came from the family of the Counts of Abenberg-Frensdorf, and had many distinguished relatives in Germany. He was born around 1075, son of Count Wolfram I von Abenberg. His mother was probably the daughter of Heinrich I, viscount of Regensburg. Conrad had two older brothers, Otto and Wolfram. He was raised for a clerical career at the court of the Emperor Henry IV, where he was a member of the court chapel. He became a canon in Hildesheim.

== Archbishop of Salzburg ==
=== Military and political endeavors ===
Conrad seems to have been involved when Henry V revolted against his father in 1105. This would explain his election as Archbishop of Salzburg at the Diet of Mainz on 7 January 1106. At that time the anti-Archbishop Berthold von Moosburg was installed in Salzburg. Conrad came to Salzburg accompanied by his brothers, the counts Otto and Wolfram, with an escort of 1,000 soldiers. Some of these soldiers may well have been servitors, servile rather than free vassals. With this display of force, he was able to force Berthold to abdicate. Pope Paschal II consecrated him as bishop on 21 October 1106 and gave him the pallium.

In July 1110, Conrad accompanied Emperor Henry V to Italy. Conrad brought a strong military escort on this visit. However, Conrad sided with the Pope in the Investiture Controversy. (Note: A dispute arose between Henry IV and Pope Gregory VII over the right of the king to appoint of a number of northern Italian bishops. At the Lenten synod in 1075 Gregory VII excommunicated five of the king's advisers. The "investiture controversy", a struggle over the relative authority of the church and the state, continued under succeeding popes and secular rulers. Pope Innocent III (1198-1216) was able to achieve many of Gregory's goals, whereby the churches retained special juridical rights subject only to the rights of the papacy.) Due to further conflicts with imperial officials, Conrad had to flee in 1112 and was not able to return to Salzburg until 1121. While in exile, he lived in Tuscany, Admont in Styria, and Saxony.

Conrad played an important role in the major political events of the day, including the election of Lothair of Supplinburg as King of Germany in 1125, whom he supported during the fight against the Hohenstaufen usurpation. During the papal schism of 1130 he played a role in the recognition of Pope Innocent II by the king. After this, tensions rose between Conrad and Lothair due to diverging views on church politics. Lothair visited Italy in 1132-33, and was crowned emperor by Innocent II on 4 June 1133. In his absence, Conrad was ordained an archbishop. This directly infringed on the emperor's right, recently confirmed by the Pope, to invest a bishop with his regalia before he was ordained. It earned a stern rebuke from Lothair.

When Lothair died, Conrad initially resisted the election of the Hohenstaufen Conrad III and supported Henry X, Duke of Bavaria instead. Conrad later came round to support the king.

=== Reform and administration ===
On his return from exile in 1121 or 1122, Conrad found his diocese "very poor and greatly devastated." Conrad worked with notables such as Hartmann von Brixen and Gerhoh von Reichersberg to reform the clergy in his archdiocese. In particular, he undertook a major reform of the cathedral clergy. Conrad presided over an assembly that supervised the affairs of the religious houses, including the cathedral, and used the canons to help administer his possessions. He maintained strong control over tithes, allocating them between the monasteries and parish priests to avoid disputes over their distribution. During his administration, clerics of servile origin steadily gained in status, now called ministerialis rather than servitor.

Between 1125 and 1130, he began minting coins at Friesach, which helped fund his projects. This served to revolutionise finance. In turn, he inspired the King of Hungary, Andrew II, to begin his own minting centres.

Conrad rebuilt and expanded Salzburg Cathedral and built the cathedral chapter house, and in 1140 he created the cathedral cemetery. He built hospitals for the poor of the city, and commenced construction of St. Peter's monastery where his former residence stood, moving to a new archbishop's residence nearer the cathedral. Conrad founded several monasteries and reformed others, a total of 17 in which the rule of the Augustinian Canons Regular prevailed. These included St. Zeno, Gurk, Reichersberg, Berchtesgaden, Baumburg, Gars am Inn, Au am Inn, Ranshofen, Höglwörth, Herrenchiemsee, Seckau and Suben. The archbishop supported the Benedictines.

During his exile, Duke Henry III of Eppenstein, brother of Ulrich I, patriarch of Aquileia (r. 1086–1121), had seized property belonging to the Salzburg diocese in Friuli and Carinthia. Conrad excommunicated him and sent a force of 1,000 soldiers to Carinthia, forcing the duke to return the properties. Later, Conrad reached an agreement of "peace and friendship" (pax et amicitia) with the Patriarch Pellegrino I of Aquileia (r. 1130–1161) whereby he agreed to pay tithes to Aquileia for those properties which the archdiocese held in the patriarchate. (Note: The Vita Chuonradi archiepiscopi, a biography of Conrad, says that "at the time of the feast of Pentecost, [Conrad] with honour and fraternal charity called on the patriarch Pilgrim, [and] as if it were a gift of all his possessions which he had in the patriarchate, of his own accord gave the tithe and confirmed the privilege, and peace and friendship between himself and [Pilgrim] was constituted for perpetuity" (cum in festo pentecoste Pilgrimum patriarchum honoris pariter et fraternae caritatis gratia vocasset, quasi pro munere de omnibus possessionibus suis quas in patriarchatu habebat, ultro decimam dedit et privilegio confirmavit, et pacem atque amiciciam inter se et illum perpetuam constituit)) Conrad's example was followed by pledges to pay their tithes from the others present when the agreement was reached.

Conrad completed construction of the castles of Hohensalzburg, Werfen, and Friesach, which Archbishop Gebhard had started to build in 1077. In Styria, he reformed the military organization and administration of church properties, and built strong fortresses. For defense against Hungary, he built strongholds at Leibnitz (Seggau) and Pettau (Ptuj), and Brestanica castle. He also expanded the Burg Deutschlandsberg castle at the center of the Salzburg possessions in western Styria. In 1131, he made peace with King Béla II of Hungary, which was followed by a long period of stability in the border region.

Conrad died on 9 April 1147 in Lungau, Salzburg. An anonymous biography, known as the Vita Chuonradi archiepiscopi Salisburgensis, was composed in the 1170s. It portrays Conrad as a man of peace. His role in the royal elections of 1125 and 1138 place him among the leading German Prince-bishops in the High Middle Ages. He earned the title of "second founder of the Salzburg church."
