= Sülzbach (Sulm) =

River in Germany

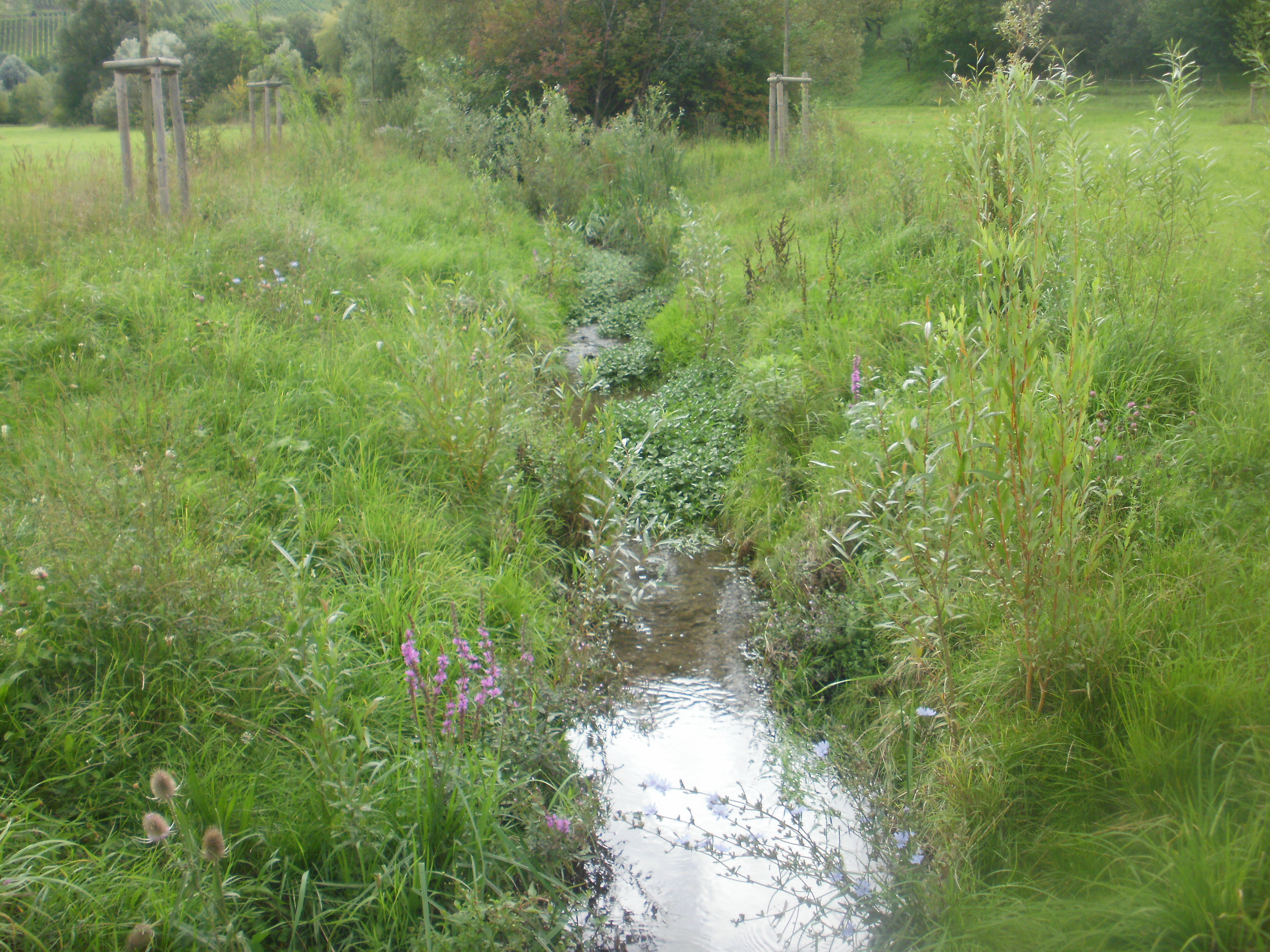

Location
- Country: Germany
- State: Baden-Württemberg

Physical characteristics
- Mouth
  - location: Sulm
  - coordinates: 49.1450°N 9.3400°E

Basin features
- Progression: Sulm→ Neckar→ Rhine→ North Sea

Sülzbach (German pronunciation: [ˈzʊltsbax]) is a small stream located in the district of Heilbronn in northeastern Baden-Württemberg, Germany. It is a left tributary of the Sulm near Ellhofen and is almost four kilometers in length.

== Name ==
The determinant of the name is derived from the Middle High German word sülze for "salt water, brine".

== Geography ==
Source and history

The Sülzbach arises in the north-eastern tip of the Weinsberg municipal area about one kilometer east of Wimmental on the road underpassing the A 6 between the motorway and the K 2113 at about 253 m above sea level. From here, the young body of water, which in Wimmental used to be called Gerbersbach, flows in a westerly direction between the two roads towards Wimmental, below the Schönenberg in the north, whose entire slope, called Dimbacher Berg, consists of vineyards, and the Kreuzberg in the south, which is wooded almost down to the left bank.

After one kilometer, it passes the Wimmental outdoor swimming pool, where the Fuchsklinge runs down the upper slope on the right, but it does not carry any water. Then it enters the settlement area of Wimmental, where it turns south, almost on the western edge of the village. It passes under the Wimmental viaduct of the motorway, here, on the right, it is accompanied by the K 2111. While the forest-crowned mountains Galgenberg and Rauhberg are still close to the left, there are now flat, cultivated hills to its right. At the inlet of the Rauhklinge from the left, whose northeastern slope is also made up of vines, it enters the municipal area of Obersulm.

At the Obersulm settlement site Am Goldberg, which stands at the western foot of the Rauhberg, there are two ponds on the left bank with a total area of about 16 km, then the Wolfsklinge flows from the east below the southern slope of the Rauhberg, which is again dominated by vineyards. After its inlet, the floodplain – here called Deele (little valley) by the inhabitants of Sülzbach – widens to the eastern bay of the sand meadows, while to the right beyond the district road 2111 are the first settlement houses of the village of Sülzbach. A ditch drains the wetland from the left into the Sülzbach.

In 2010, close to the dam on the Crailsheim–Heilbronn railway, the Sulm Water Association completed a retention basin without permanent damming with an 11.6 m high earth dam and a retention volume of up to 235,000 m^{3} for flood protection. After flowing through its dam and that of the railway, the stream enters the Sulm floodplain and the settlement area of Sülzbach in a curve to the southwest before the Sülzbacher Altenberg. The Sülzbach passes its old town center on the left and runs over a weir immediately before crossing under the district road 2112 (Staufenstraße). After crossing the newer commercial zone of the village on its banks, the Sülzbach flows into the Sulm from the right after a total of 3.8 km at about 183 m above sea level.

=== Catchment area ===
The catchment area of the Sülzbach covers 4.7 km^{2} and has a triangular shape. Its northeastern tip lies on the plateau of the Gagernberg, from where the watershed runs in a southwesterly direction via Galgenberg, Rauhberg and the Sülzbacher Altenberg to the mouth. Beyond lies the large catchment area of the Dimbach, which drains to the Brettach via the Schwabbach, and that of the Seebächle in the southeast. To the west, beyond the range of hills that accompany the southbound section of the Sülzbach to the right, lies the parallel valley of the Wetterischbach, which flows through Grantschen, and the catchment area boundary extends north up to the Prinzessinwäldle on the ridge of the Wildenberg, where the northwestern tip of the catchment area lies. On the remainder of the eastward part of the watershed on the north side over the Buch, where the highest point at 317.7 m above sea level is located, and the Schönenberg back to the Gagernberg, first the larger Eberbach, which flows into the Sulm shortly before Erlenbach, competes in the north, then the Dimbach again.

More than three quarters of the catchment area lies in open land, the remaining wooded part is limited to the high and north-facing slopes, while the south-facing slopes are mostly used for viticulture.

Municipalities and towns

The Sülzbach runs through the municipal areas of Weinsberg and Obersulm. The majority of the catchment area is within Weinsberg's municipal limits, Obersulm has less than half as large a share. About 0.4 km^{2} at its northeastern tip form an Ellhofen municipal exclave, on which there is almost only forest. A tiny snippet in the west also belongs to Ellhofen, a slightly larger one in the north to Bretzfeld. The only villages in the catchment area are Wimmental (to Weinsberg) and the residential area Am Goldberg and Sülzbach (both to Obersulm); all three are on the banks of the stream.

== Landscape and conservation ==
Northeast of Wimmental and west of Wimmental, two old reed sandstone quarries on the edge of the valley of the northern plateau are under biotope protection. Some blades are also noteworthy on this upper talc edge, including the Fuchsklinge and another on the Eselskopf northwest of Wimmental.

In the meadow, a number of field woods are protected as biotopes, the wood in the Wolfsklinge, some dry stone walls in the vineyards and sunken paths; in the case of wetlands, the sand meadows on the lower reaches, the perimeter of the ponds located near the Am Goldberg residential area and the surroundings of a tiny pond west of Wimmental.

There are some natural monuments located nearby including two horse chestnut trees on the Altenberg west of Wimmental, a pear tree on the edge of the vineyard of the Rauhberg, the Wolfsklinge, the sand meadows and the summit of the (Sülzbacher) Altenberg.

== Geology and natural environment ==
The plateaus of Schönenberg, Buch, Wildenberg, Gagernberg, Kreuzberg, Galgenberg and Rauhberg, which accompany the upper valley on the right and left and the middle one on the left, are all located in the reed sandstone (Stuttgart formation), while the spring and the valley below the uppermost slopes lie along their entire length in the gypsum keuper (Grabfeld formation) below. The low range of hills to the right of the southern course is covered by loess, which also occupies part of the Gagernberg plateau.

The two old quarries mentioned above offer outcrops of the local reed sandstone deposits, at an earlier geotope on the (Sülzbacher) Altenberg the estheria layers of the gypsum keuper lying on the summit are exposed.

In terms of natural space, the area is counted as part of the Swabian-Franconian Forest Mountains, namely with the upper part up to the Wimmentaler Laufknick to the Sulmer Bergebene sub-area, then to the Weinsberg Valley sub-area.
