= Kastl Abbey =

Former Benedictine monastery in Bavaria, Germany

Coordinates: 49°22′09″N 11°41′00″E

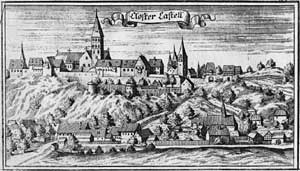
Engraving of Kastl Abbey from the "Churbaierische Atlas" of Anton Wilhelm Ertl, 1687

Kastl Abbey (German: Kloster Kastl) is a former Benedictine monastery in Kastl in the Upper Palatinate, Bavaria.

== History ==
The monastery, dedicated to Saint Peter, was founded in 1103, or shortly before, by Count Berengar II of Sulzbach together with Frederick and Otto, Counts of Kastl-Habsberg.

It was dissolved in 1563 in the course of the Reformation, but re-established as a Catholic monastery in 1625. From 1636 the building was used by the Jesuits, from 1773 by the Knights Hospitallers. Dissolved again in 1803, it was the seat of the Provincial Court until 1862.

From 1958 to 2006 the buildings housed a Hungarian secondary boarding school, now closed.

== Princess Anna ==
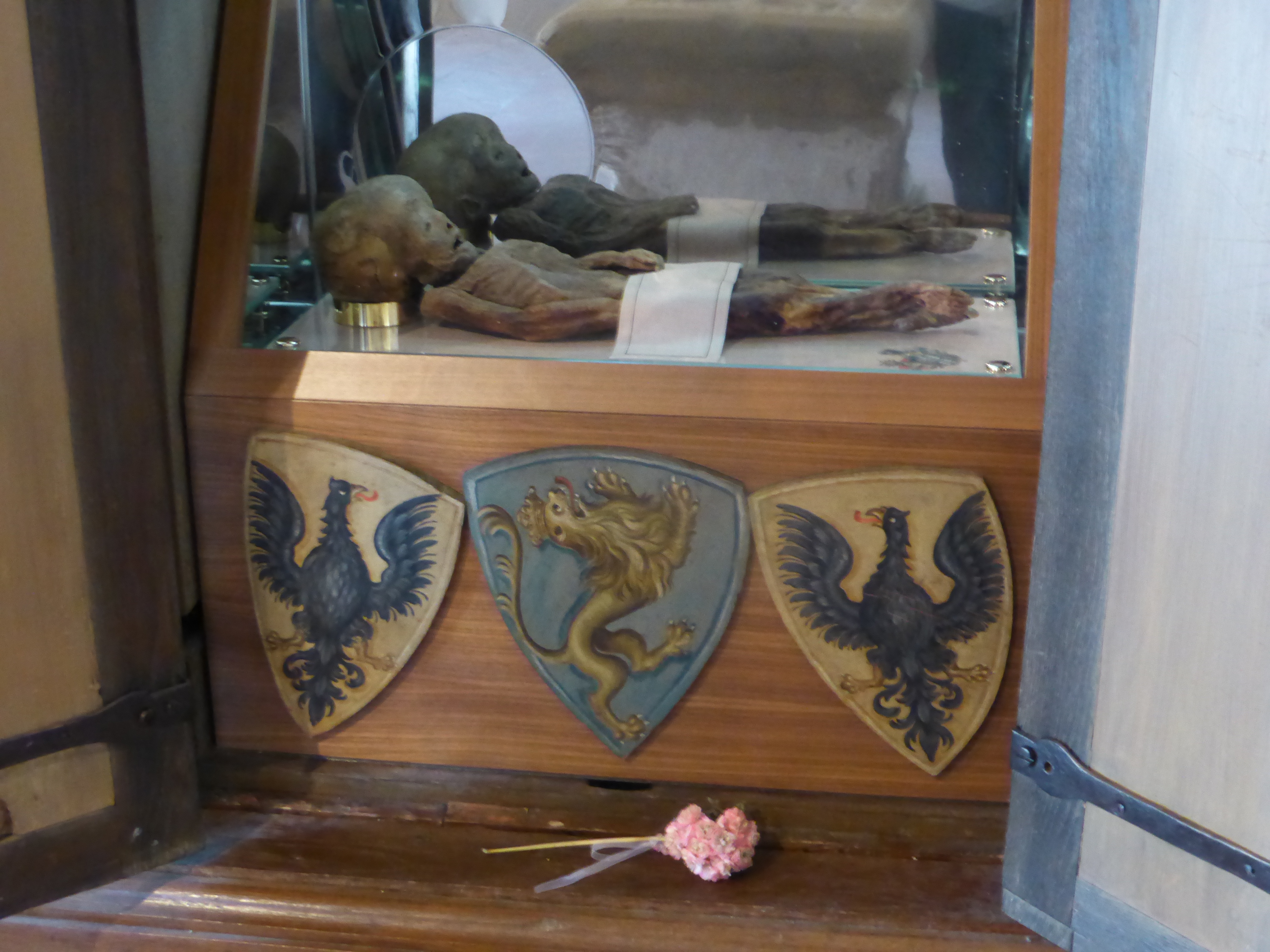
Mummified body of Princess Anna

Anna, daughter of Emperor Louis IV, died here on 29 January 1319 aged 18 months. Her body was not taken to Munich but was entombed in the monastery. In 1715 the body was removed from its tomb and kept in an oak cupboard. Later, preserved as a mummy, it lay in a shrine in the entrance hall to the monastery church, where it could be viewed. The body of the princess was recently returned to its tomb to protect it from light damage and a large photo is on display instead.

== See also ==
- List of Jesuit sites
