= Baumburg Abbey =

German religious monastery

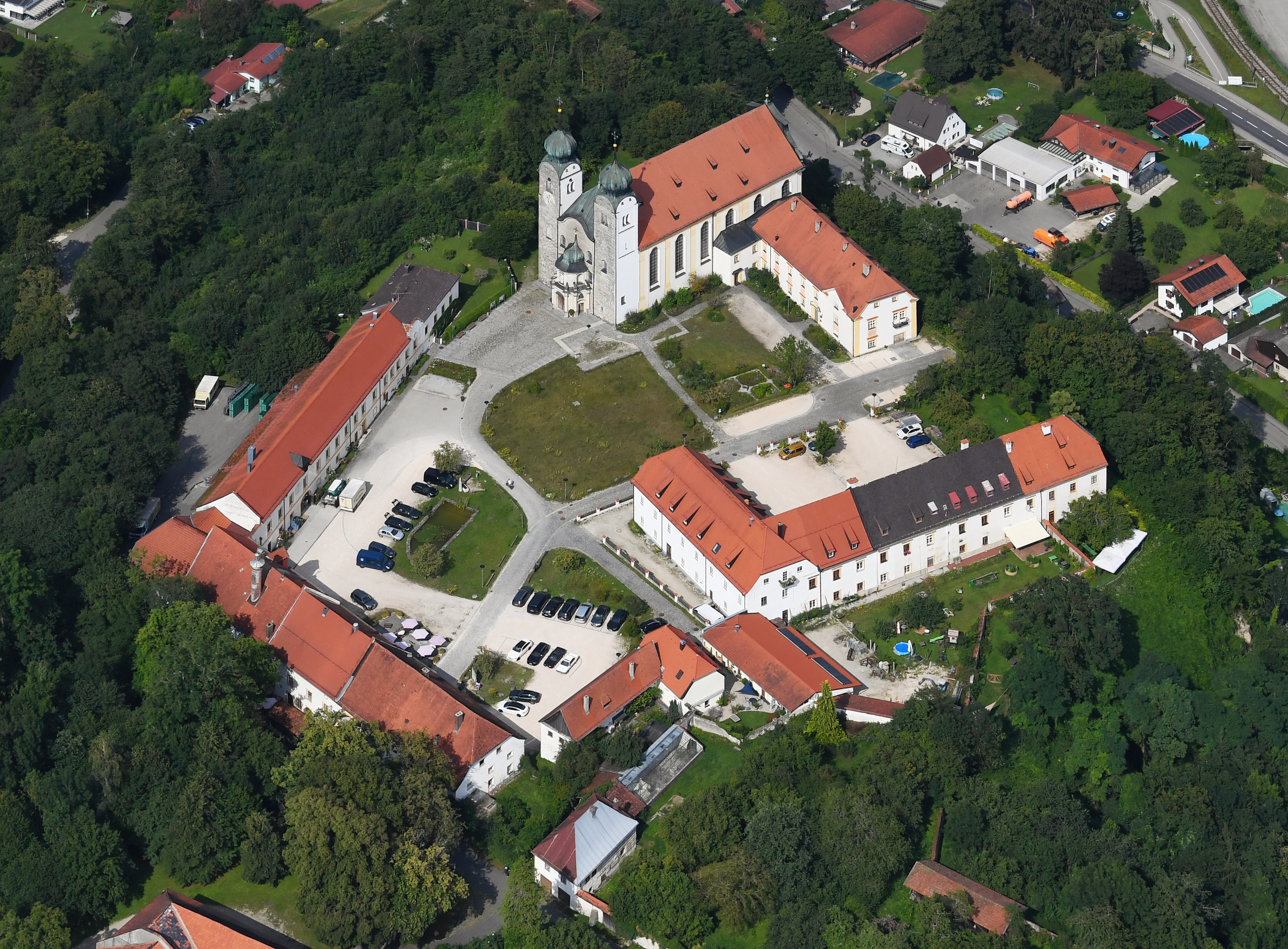
- Aerial view of Baumburg Abbey

- Location within Bavaria
- Interactive map of Baumburg Abbey

Monastery information
- Order: Augustinian Canons Regular
- Established: 1107-09
- Disestablished: 1803

People
- Founder: Count Berengar II of Sulzbach

Site
- Coordinates: 47.998056°N 12.530833°E

Baumburg Abbey is a former monastery of Augustinian Canons Regular in the northern Traunstein district of Bavaria, Germany. It was founded in 1107–1109 and dissolved in 1803. Today Baumburg is a Catholic deanery that covers the parishes of the northern Chiemgau.

== Foundation ==
The monastery St. Margareth zu Baumburg was founded by Count Berengar II of Sulzbach in 1107–1109 to fulfill his oath on the death of his wife Adelheid von Megling-Frontenhausen. Count Berengar appointed Eberwin as provost of the monastery. He moved Augustinian canons to the new abbey from the Berchtesgaden Provostry, which he and Eberwin had previously peopled with canons from Rottenbuch Abbey. He also appropriated property from Berchtesgaden for the new monastery. However, around 1116 Berengar let Eberwin return to Berchtesgaden to lead it again as an independent monastery. (Note: Different sources give different dates for Eberwin's return to Berchtesgaden, ranging from 1106 to 1119.)

The new provost Gottschalk (ca. 1120–1163) of Baumburg was not at all pleased with the detachment of Berchtesgaden. He called Eberwin an "apostate" and removed him from the dean's list. In addition, he was not prepared to accept the loss of the Berchtesgaden property. After the death of Berengar (3 December 1125) he challenged the legality of the separation of the two monasteries and appealed to the responsible bishop, Archbishop Conrad I of Salzburg (1106–1147), for an injunction to re-merge. After an arbitration awarded by Conrad in 1136 the separation of the two monasteries as wished by Berengar was reaffirmed, and in 1142 reconfirmed by Pope Innocent II. The Baumburg claims were dismissed as the "simple-minded opinion of certain brothers".

== Early years ==
During the tenure of Gottschalk as provost of the Baumburg Abbey (to 1163) a church of St. Nicholas was consecrated in 1129, and in 1156 the Romanesque Basilica of St. Margaret was built. Around this time the Archbishop of Salzburg made the provost of Baumburg an archdeacon. Thus he acted as deputy to the archbishop for the ecclesiastical jurisdiction, church oversight and asset management. In 1185 the Pope confirmed this function.

The Augustinian canons acted primarily as pastors. The monastery was assigned the parishes of Baumburg-Altenmarkt, Sankt Georgen, Truchtlaching, Traunwalchen, Neuenchieming, Kienberg, Poing (now Truchtlaching) and partner churches and possessions in Lower Austria. The abbey school was also important, serving most of the sons of the regional nobility. As of 1367, the provosts were also given the rights of Abbots.

Like other abbeys, in the 15th century and during the Protestant Reformation the Baumburg Abbey experienced a religious and economic decline. More than once Baumburg was placed under administration, including between 1536 and 1538 under the provost of the Berchtesgaden Abbey and later under provost Prince Wolfgang II Griesstätter zu Haslach, provost of Höglwörth Abbey and then Prince Provost of Berchtesgaden. Between 1523 and 1539 the monastery was three times devastated by fires. By 1579 there were only three canons lived in the abbey.

== Later revival ==
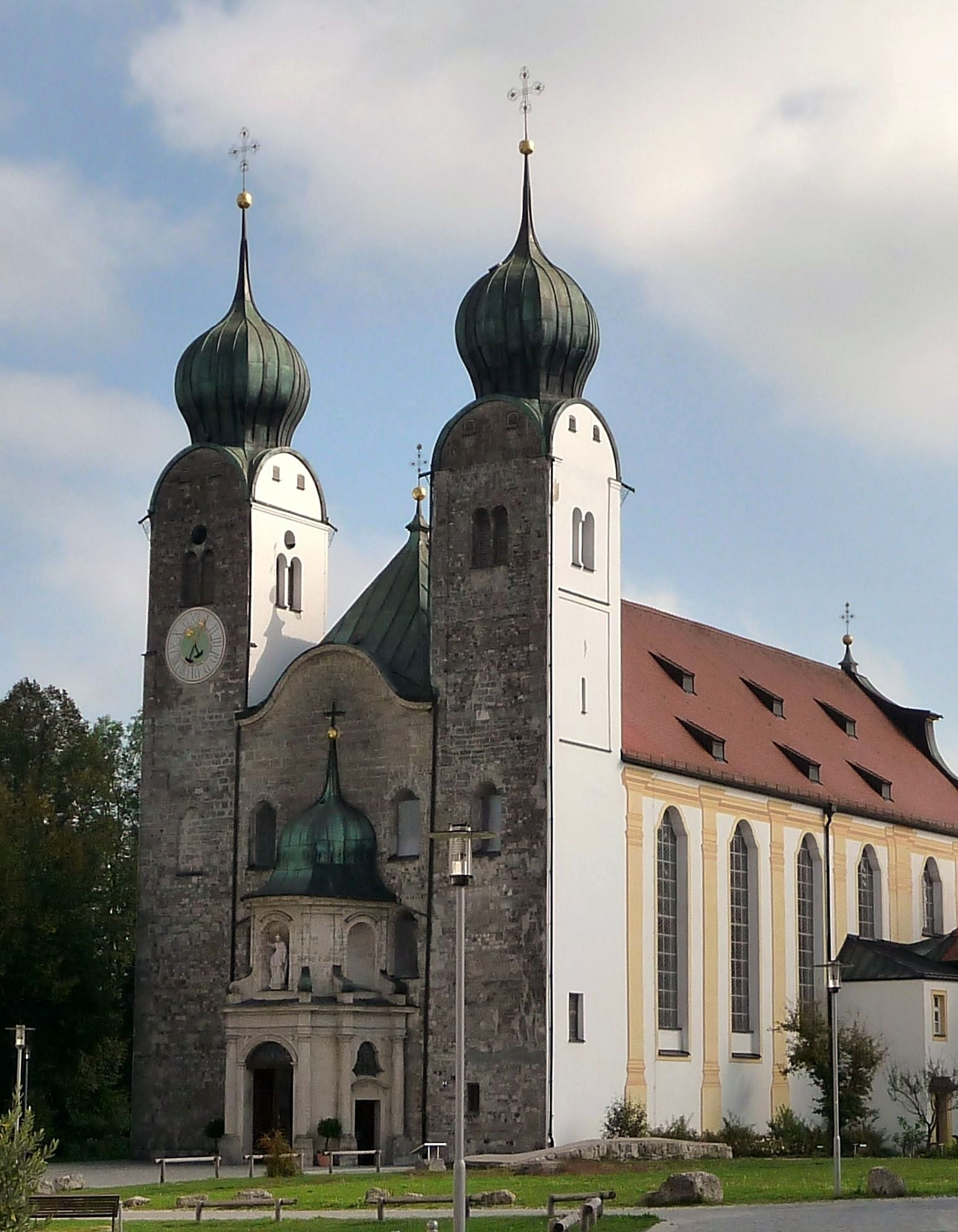
The monastery church of St. Margaret

With the end of the 16th Century Baumburg came back to life. The Collegiate School regained its good reputation among the nobility, and the number of canons increased again.

A Baroque transformation of the formerly Gothic buildings of the congregation began in 1600 with a renovation of the medieval church. The towers received their characteristic onion domes. The provosts Michael Doegger (r. 1688–1706) and Patricius Stöttner (r. 1707–1737) led the conversion and new construction of the monastery buildings. On the occasion of the 600th anniversary of consecration in 1755 the architect Franz Alois Mayr from Trostberg built the present church of St. Margareta in the Rococo style with stucco filigrees and frescoes.

The monastery was closed in 1803 during secularization by the Bavarian State. In 1812 the abbey and farm buildings as well as the abbey's properties were auctioned. The collegiate church now serves as a parish church for Altenmarkt an der Alz. Many of the monastery buildings were demolished. Since 1910 a wing of the abbey has been used as a parsonage. Another wing for a long time served as a convalescent home. Today it houses a private seminar hotel, which is often used by choirs and orchestras. The Baumberg Abbey brewery, established in 1612, is now also privately owned.

== Gallery ==
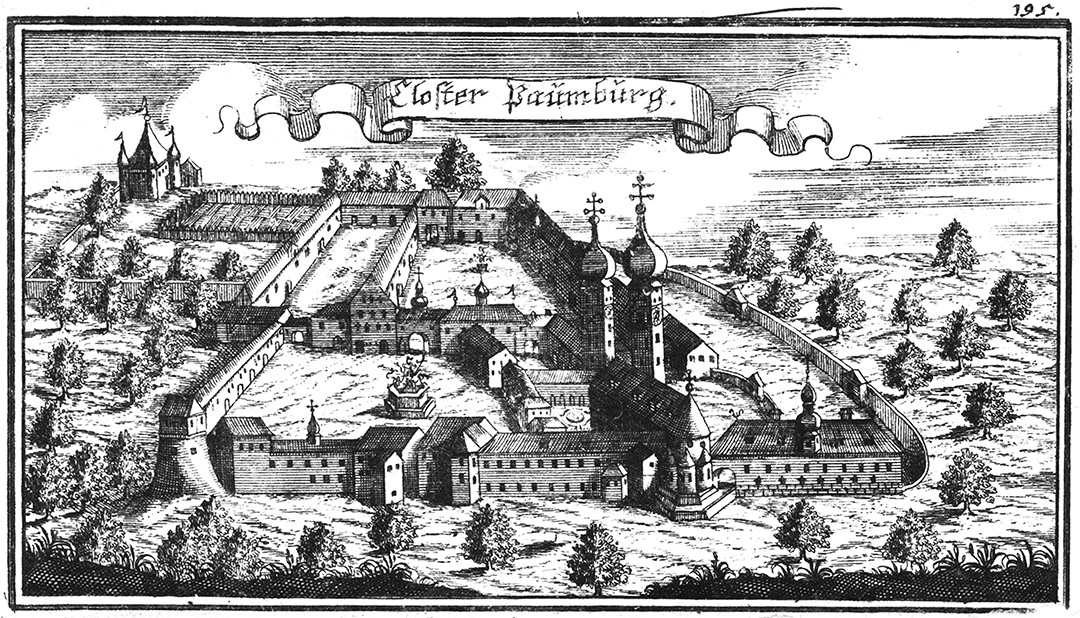
Engraving of the monastery from the "Churbaierische Atlas" of Anton Wilhelm Ertl 1687

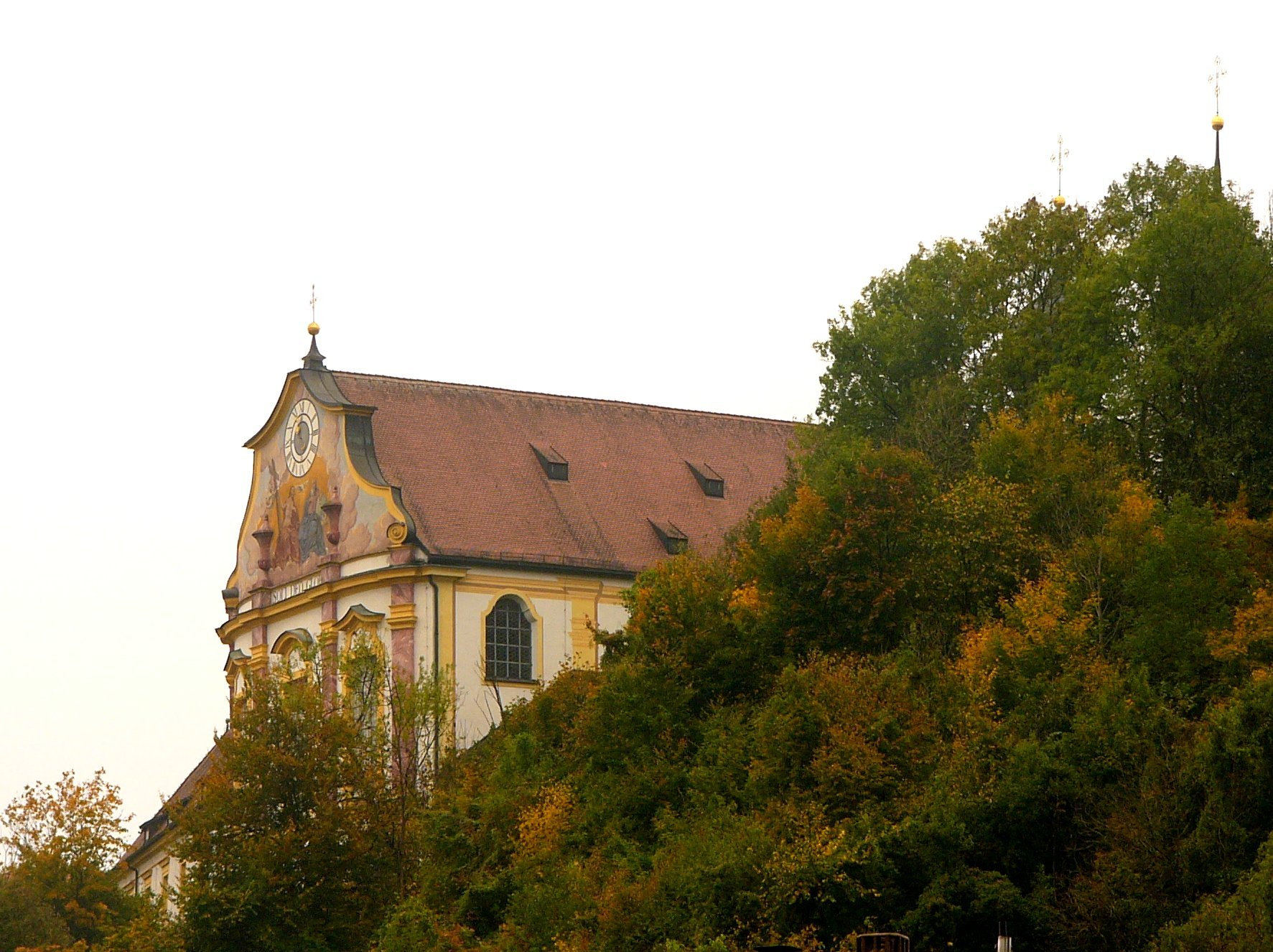
Rear of the church

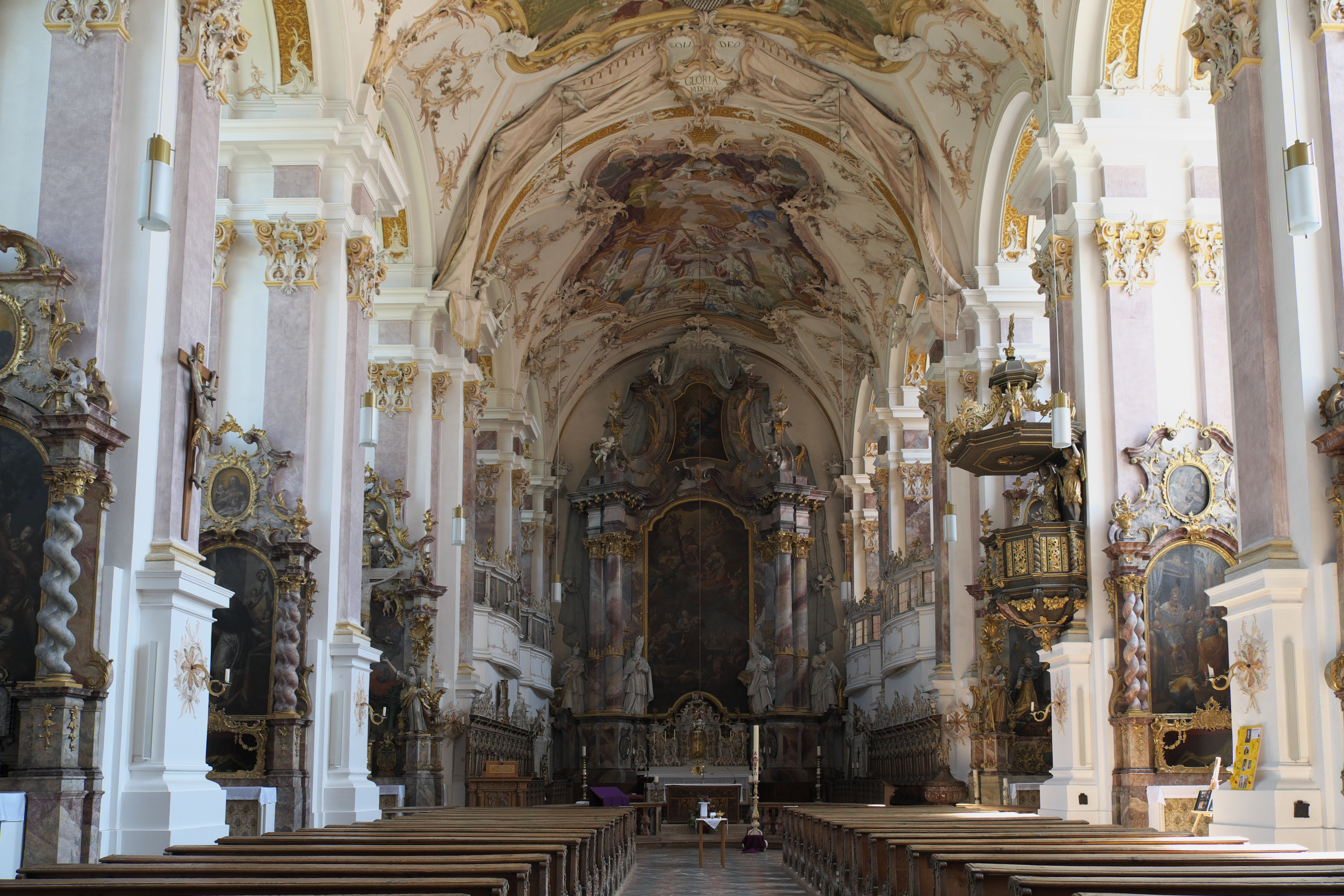
Interior of the St. Margareta church

== Provosts ==
Provosts for which there are records include:

- ca. 1107/09–1116/19 Eberwin
- ca. 1116/19–1120/25 Dekan Eccolf
- ca. 1120/25–1163/70 Gottschalk
- ca. 1163/70–1182/87 Meingot
- 1187–1192 Marsilius
- ca. 1195–1205 Otto
- ca. 1217/19–1240 Eberhard
- 1436–1479 Caspar Ebenhauser
- 1479–1488 Paulus Pelchinger
- 1488–1515 Georg I. Dietrichinger
- 1517–1531 Wolfgang Viergold
- 1531–1539 Administration by Wolfgang II Griesstätter zu Haslach
- 1539–1578 Stephan Toblhamer
- 1587–1622 Urban Stamler
- 1637–1648 Johann Zehentner
- 1688–1706 Michael Doegger
- 1707–1737 Patritius II. Stöttner
- 1748–1761 Joachim Vischer
- 1761–1778 Guarinus Steininger
- 1778–1789 Monastery under administration
- 1786–1789 Albert I. Knoll
- 1790–1801 Franz I. Krumb
- 1801 – 22 March 1803 Franz II Lindemann
