= Berengar II of Sulzbach =

Count of Sulzbach in Bavaria and a leader of the reform party (c. 1080/3–1125)

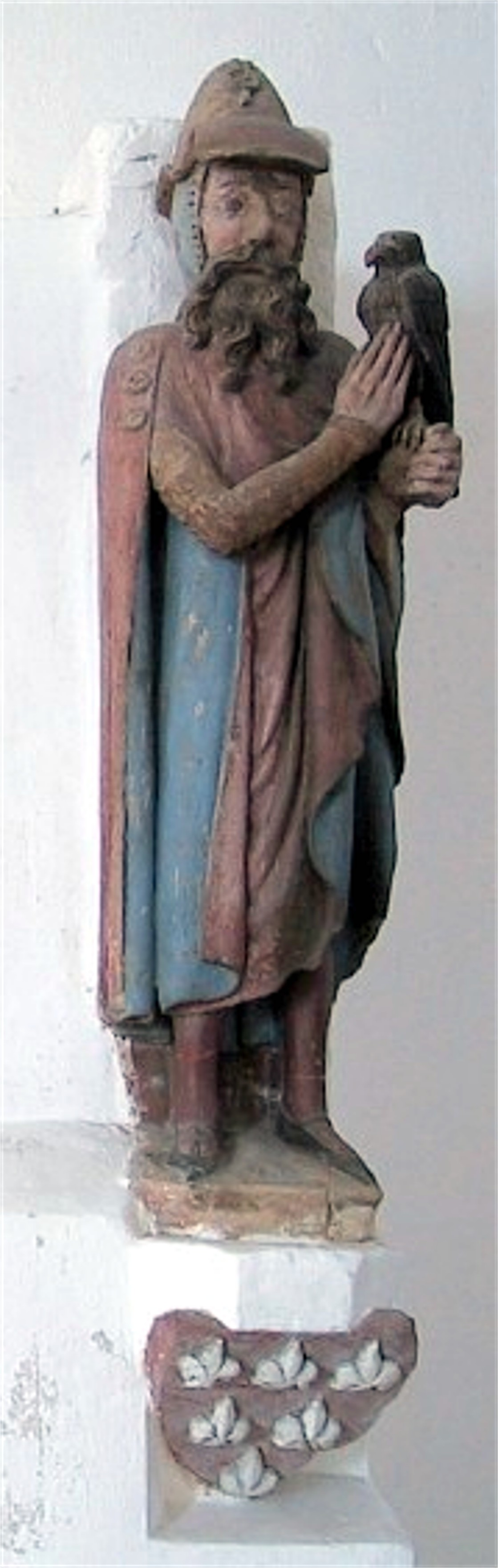
- Berengar II of Sulzbach with hunting falcon in Kastl Abbey.

Count of Sulzbach
- Tenure: 1085-1125
- Predecessor: Count Gebhard II von Sulzbach
- Successor: Count Gebhard III von Sulzbach
- Born: c 1080–83
- Died: 3 December 1125
- Spouse: Adelheid of Wolfratshausen
- Issue: Gebhard III, Count of Sulzbach; Adelheid of Sulzbach, Abbess of Niedernburg; Gertrude of Sulzbach, Queen of Germany; Bertha of Sulzbach, Byzantine Empress; Luitgarde of Sulzbach, Duchess of Lower Lorraine; Matilda of Sulzbach
- Father: Gebhard II of Sulzbach
- Mother: Irmgard of Rott

Count Berengar II of Sulzbach (c. 1080–83 – 3 December 1125), also written as Berengar I of Sulzbach, (Note: Berengar was the first Berengar, Count of Sulzbach of his house, and is sometimes called Berengar I of Sulzbach. However, his great-grandfather was also Count Berengar of Sulzbach.) was ruled over the town of Sulbach-Rosenberg in modern-day Bavaria, Germany. He sided with Pope Gregory VII during the Investiture Controversy in opposition to Henry IV, Holy Roman Emperor. He later supported Henry V in his successful rebellion against his father. He founded several abbeys and monasteries, such as Baumburg Abbey.

== Family ==
Berengar was the son of Count Gebhard II of Sulzbach (died 1085) and Irmgard of Rott (died 14 June 1101). His sister Adelheid von Sulzbach may have married Count Siboto II of the powerful Bayern-Falkenstein house, who was later the advocate of Baumburg Abbey. The Falkensteins at first supported Henry IV in his conflict with Pope Gregory VII during the Investiture Controversy. Later Siboto II was associated with the pro-papal side that Sulzbachs were on.

Around 11055 Berengar married Adelheid von Dießen‑Wolfratshausen, with whom he had six children. Four of these children married into the higher-ranking nobility. His son, Count Gebhard III of Sulzbach, married Matilda, daughter of Henry IX, Duke of Bavaria. His daughter Gertrude was the wife of King Conrad III of Germany. Luitgarde was the wife of Godfrey II, Count of Louvain and Duke of Lower Lorraine. In 1143 his daughter Bertha, later known as Irene, married the Emperor Manuel I Komnenos of the Byzantine Empire (c. 1120–1180).

== Advisor to Henry V ==
On 5 February 1104 Count Sigehard of Burghausen was murdered, and Henry IV, Holy Roman Emperor, was blamed for the crime. Berengar was one of the Bavarian Nordgau princes who accused the King of the murder. They encouraged Henry V to rebel against his father. The noble reform party thought that the Henry IV was leading the people to destruction and only the church of the Gregorian and Monastic Reform could point the way to salvation.

On 12 December 1104 King Henry V with a small retinue left his father's camp in Fritzlar and took refuge in Bavaria, the start of the rebellion. During the struggle from 1104 to 1106 Berengar was often with Henry V and one of his key advisers in affairs of the kingdom. In 1106 Henry IV took refuge from his son in Regensburg, calling for assistance from the Czech Duke Bořivoj. The Czech army came up, but when they saw that Henry V was supported by Margrave Diepold III and Count Berengar they retreated. The emperor continued his flight, and died at Liège on 8 August 1106.

Between 1108 and 1111 Berengar took part in the campaigns in Hungary and Poland and on Henry's expedition to Rome. From January 1116 to autumn 1119 there is no sign of his presence at the royal court of Henry V. It is believed that during this time Count Berengar dedicated his absence from the royal court to increasing his monasteries.

Henry V died on 23 May 1125. Berengar was present at the emperor's funeral, and was one of the signatories to a letter inviting the leading men of the kingdom to attend a diet on 25 August 1125 to elect a successor. The first signatory was Adalbert I, Archbishop of Mainz, the archchancellor of Germany. The other secular signatories were Henry IX, Duke of Bavaria, Frederick II, Duke of Swabia and Godfrey, Count Palatine.

Berengar died on 3 December 1125 and was succeeded by his son Gebhard III.

== Religious foundations ==
As one of the leaders of the ecclesiastical reform circle in Upper Bavaria, Swabia and Saxony, Berengar was one of the founders of the Abbeys of Berchtesgaden, Kastl, and Baumberg.

=== Berchtesgaden Provostry ===
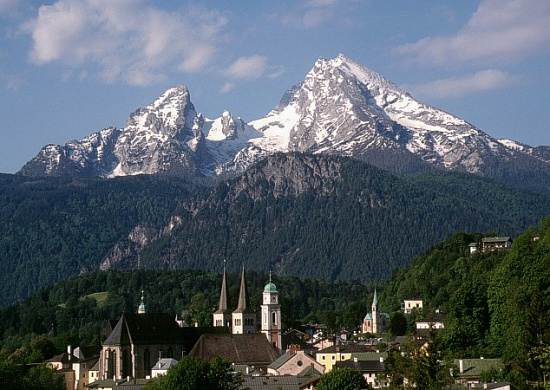
Berchtesgaden

Berengar's first monastery foundation, the Berchtesgaden Provostry, was commissioned by his mother Irmgard of Rott. According to legend, it was founded in fulfillment of a vow of thanksgiving for the salvation of his father, Gebhard II of Sulzbach, after a hunting accident at the rock on which the Berchtesgaden Collegiate Church stands today. His mother Irmgard owned Berchtesgaden from her first marriage with Count Engelbert V of Chiemgau, and as his widow had made a vow to have a house built for use by an "assembly of clergy of communal life" ("congregatio clericorum communis vite"). Due to various worldly affairs Irmgard did not have the time to found the congregation, so shortly before her death she commissioned Berengar with the task, to promote his and her salvation.

In the year of his mother's death, 1101, Berengar appointed the canon Eberwin as the first provost. Under his guidance, he sent three Augustinian canons and four lay brothers to Berchtesgaden from Rottenbuch Abbey, the mother abbey of the Augustinians in Altbayern and a center of the canonical reform movement. Berengar and his half-brother Kuno von Horburg-Lechsgemünd then requested papal confirmation for the founding of the monastery. Probably in 1102 and no later than 1105 Kuno von Horburg and Eberwin traveled to Rome on behalf of Berengar. Pope Paschal II had very likely on 7 April 1102 placed the Count's monastery under his protection. He confirmed this privilege in writing to Berengar and Kuno von Horburg. (Note: Paschalis episcopus, servus servorum dei, dilectis filiis Berengano et Cononi comitibus salutem et apostolicam benedictionem... (Paschal, bishop, servant of the servants of God, to his beloved sons Berengar and Kuno, counts, greetings and apostolic benediction...) (Anm. 45))

According to the Fundatio monasterii Berchtesgadensis the Augustinians at first found the lonely wilderness of Berchtesgaden, with its terrifying mountain forests, and permanent ice and snow a very inhospitable place, and sought somewhere more suitable.

=== Kastl Abbey ===
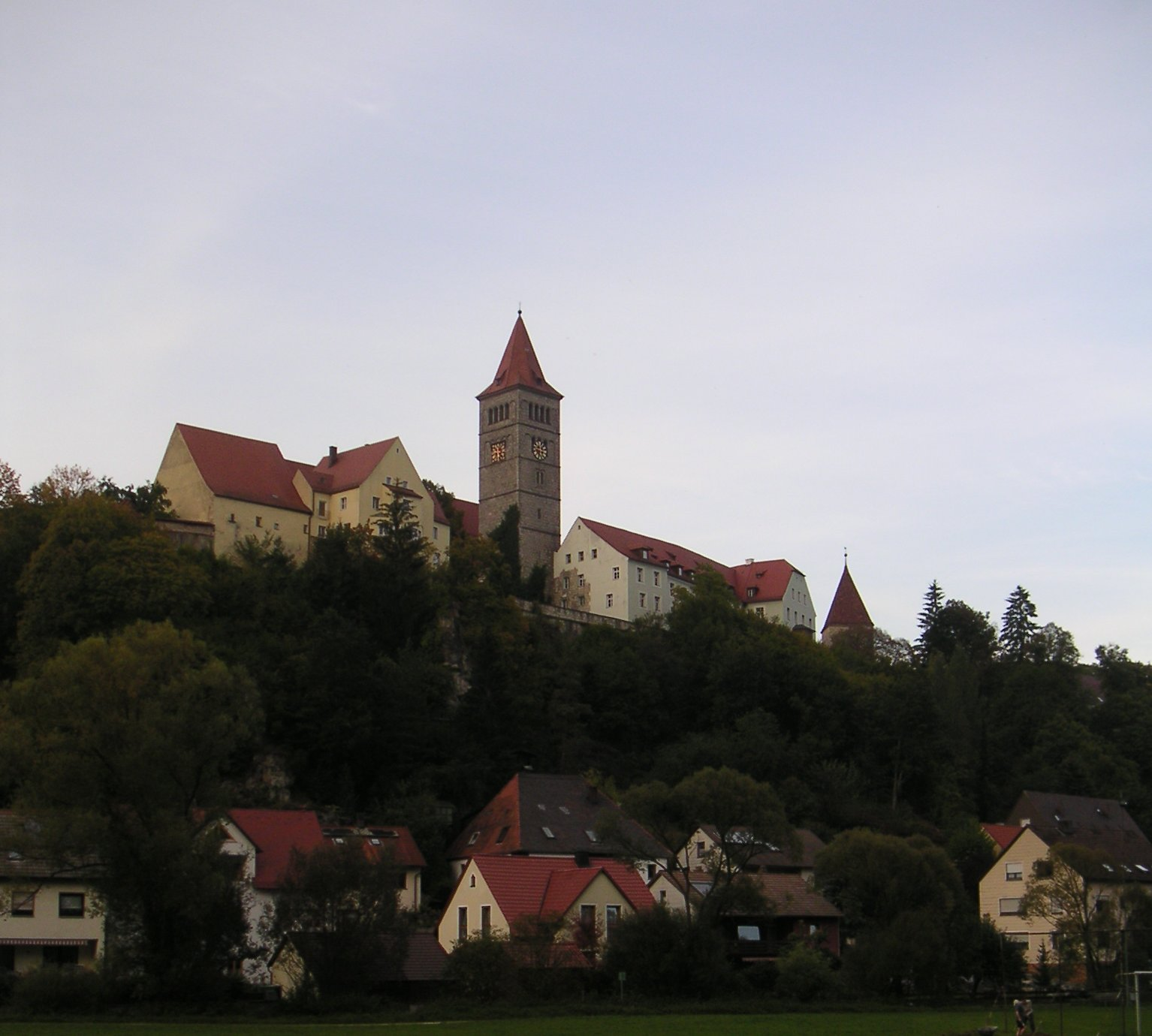
Kastl Abbey

After the Lateran council of March/April 1102, on 12 May 1102 Berengar was granted the privilege of founding the St Peter monastery in Kastl according to the Hirsauer reform. Berengar co-founded the abbey with Count Friedrich of Kastl-Habsburg and his son Otto. Diepold III of Cham-Vohburg also assisted with the foundation.

=== Baumburg Abbey ===
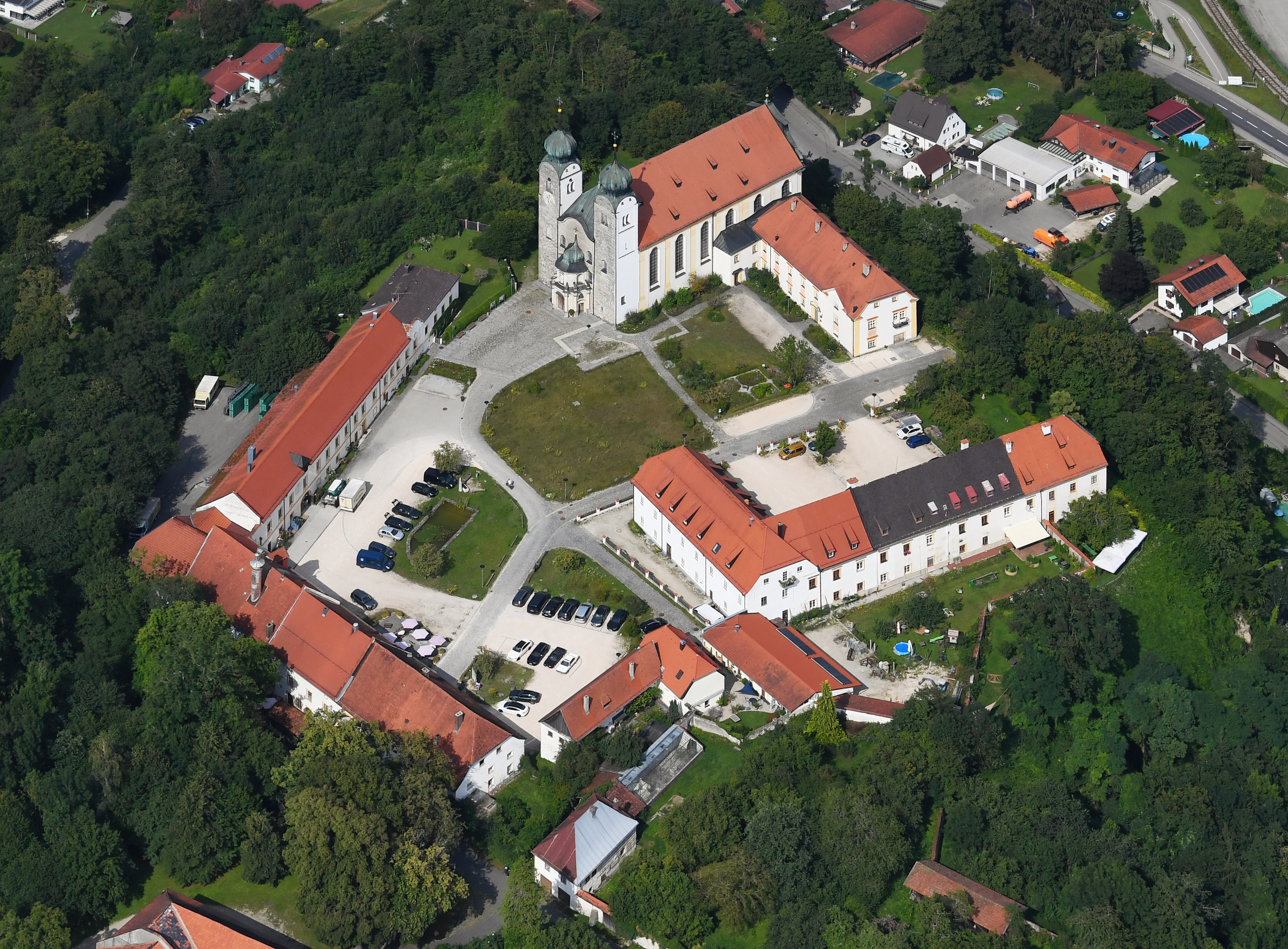
Baumburg Abbey

In 1102 Paschal gave Berengar the privilege of founding Baumburg Abbey. In 1104–06 Berengar was deeply involved in the struggles of Henry V against his father Emperor Henry IV, and was unable to implement the wishes of his wife Adelheid von Lechsgemünd to spend the inheritance from her first two marriages to establish a Reform congregation. Adelheid therefore felt compelled before her death (1104/1105) to place her husband and a dozen selected ministers under oath to establish a regular canons monastery to the north of lake Chiemsee and to annex the existing church of St. Margaret in Baumburg. But to found two monasteries within three or four years and to participate in the reform of the Kastl Abbey at the same time gave him great difficulty. He therefore followed the urging of his church officials and expanded Baumburg with goods from Berchtesgaden so he would have at least one well-equipped monastery, and would meet the wishes of his mother and first wife.

In 1107, or at the latest in 1109, Eberwin and his monks from Berchtesgaden founded Baumburg Abbey in the north of the present Traunstein district. Later, probably around 1116, Eberwin returned to Berchtesgaden where the first major land clearing was undertaken and the Augustinians settled permanently. The independence of Berchtesgaden was not secure, since Gottschalk (ca. 1120–1163), provost of Baumburg, was not willing to accept the loss of the Berchtesgaden assets. After Berengar died in 1125, Gottschalk challenged the legality of the separation and asked Archbishop Conrad I of Salzburg for an injunction to re-merge the properties. Conrad finally confirmed the independence of both monasteries in 1136, which was confirmed by Pope Innocent II in 1142.

== Sources ==
- Albrecht, Dieter (1995). "Die Fürstpropstei Berchtesgaden". In Max Spindler, Andreas Kraus (ed.). Handbuch der bayerischen Geschichte: Teilbd. Geschichte der Oberpfalz und des Bayerischen Reichskreises bis zum Ausgang des 18. Jahrhunderts. C.H.Beck. ISBN 978-3-406-39453-9.
- "Berchtesgaden, Chorherrenstift". Haus der Bayerischen Geschichte.
- Brugger, Walter; Dopsch, Heinz; Kramml, Peter F. (1991). Geschichte von Berchtesgaden: Zwischen Salzburg und Bayern (bis 1594). Plenk. ISBN 978-3-922590-63-7.
- Cosmas of Prague (2009). The Chronicle of the Czechs. CUA Press. ISBN 978-0-8132-1570-9.
- Dopsch, Heinz (1991). "Siedlung und Recht. Zur Vorgeschichte der Berchtesgadener Stiftsgründer". Geschichte von Berchtesgaden: Zwischen Salzburg und Bayern (bis 1594). Plenk. ISBN 978-3-922590-63-7.
- Feulner, Manfred (1986). Berchtesgaden - Geschichte des Landes und seiner Bewohner. Berchtesgaden: Berchtesgadener Anzeiger. ISBN 3-925647-00-7.
- Freed, John B. (1984). The Counts of Falkenstein: Noble Self-consciousness in Twelfth-century Germany. American Philosophical Society. ISBN 978-0-87169-746-2.
- Hlawitschka, Eduard (2006). "Zur Abstammung Richwaras, der Gemahlin Herzog Bertholds I. von Zähringen". Zeitschrift für die Geschichte des Oberrheins (154).
- Koch-Sternfeld, Joseph Ernst von (1815). Geschichte des Fürstenthums Berchtesgaden und seiner Salzwerke: In drey Büchern. 1056 – 1303. Vol. 1. Salzburg: Mayer.
- Leyser, Karl (1994-07-01). Communications and Power in Medieval Europe: The Gregorian Revolution and Beyond. Continuum. ISBN 978-0-8264-3028-1.
- McNeal, Edgar Holmes; Thatcher, Oliver J. (1905). A Source Book of Mediæval History: Selected Documents Illustrating the History of Europe in the Middle Age. Charles Scribner's Sons.
- Otto I of Freising (1953). The Deeds of Frederick Barbarossa. Translated by Mierow, Charles Christopher. Columbia University Press.
- Robinson, I. S. (2003-12-04). Henry IV of Germany 1056–1106. Cambridge University Press. ISBN 978-0-521-54590-7.
- Smith, William (1880). A Dictionary of Greek and Roman Biography and Mythology. J. Murray.
- Walko, Martin Johann (2004). "Die Traditionen des Augustiner-Chorherrenstifts Baumburg an der Alz". Quellen und Erörterungen zur Bayerischen Geschichte. 44 (1). Munich.
- Weinfurter, Stefan; Brugger, Walter; Dopsch, Heinz; Kramml, Peter F. (1991). "Die Gründung des Augustiner-Chorherrenstiftes – Reformidee und Anfänge der Regularkanoniker in Berchtesgaden". Geschichte von Berchtesgaden: Zwischen Salzburg und Bayern (bis 1594) (in German). Vol. 1. Berchtesgaden: Plenk. ISBN 978-3-922590-63-7.
