= Matilda of Sulzbach =

Noble

- Margravine of Istria
- Died: 31 October or 3 November 1165
- Spouse: Engelbert III, Margrave of Istria
- Issue: 4
- Father: Berengar II of Sulzbach
- Mother: Adelheid of Wolfratshausen

Matilda of Sulzbach (died 31 October or 3 November 1165) was Margravine of Istria by marriage to Engelbert III of Istria. Different dates of death are given in the necrologies of Baumburg Abbey and two monasteries of Salzburg.

== Life ==
She was a daughter of Berengar II, Count of Sulzbach (c. 1080 – 3 December 1125) and his second wife Adelheid of Wolfratshausen. The identity of her mother is mentioned in the "Kastler Reimchronik", Vers 525.

Matilda married Engelbert III of Istria. Her husband witnessed the granting of the Privilegium Minus creating the Duchy of Austria. They had four children:
