= Bertha of Sulzbach =

Byzantine empress from 1146 to 1160

Byzantine Empress consort
- Tenure: 1146–1160
- Born: c. 1110s Sulzbach-Rosenberg, Hesse, Holy Roman Empire
- Died: 1160; Constantinople, Byzantine Empire
- Spouse: Manuel I Komnenos (m. 1146–1160)
- Issue: Maria Komnene; Anna Komnene
- Father: Berengar II of Sulzbach
- Mother: Adelheid of Wolfratshausen

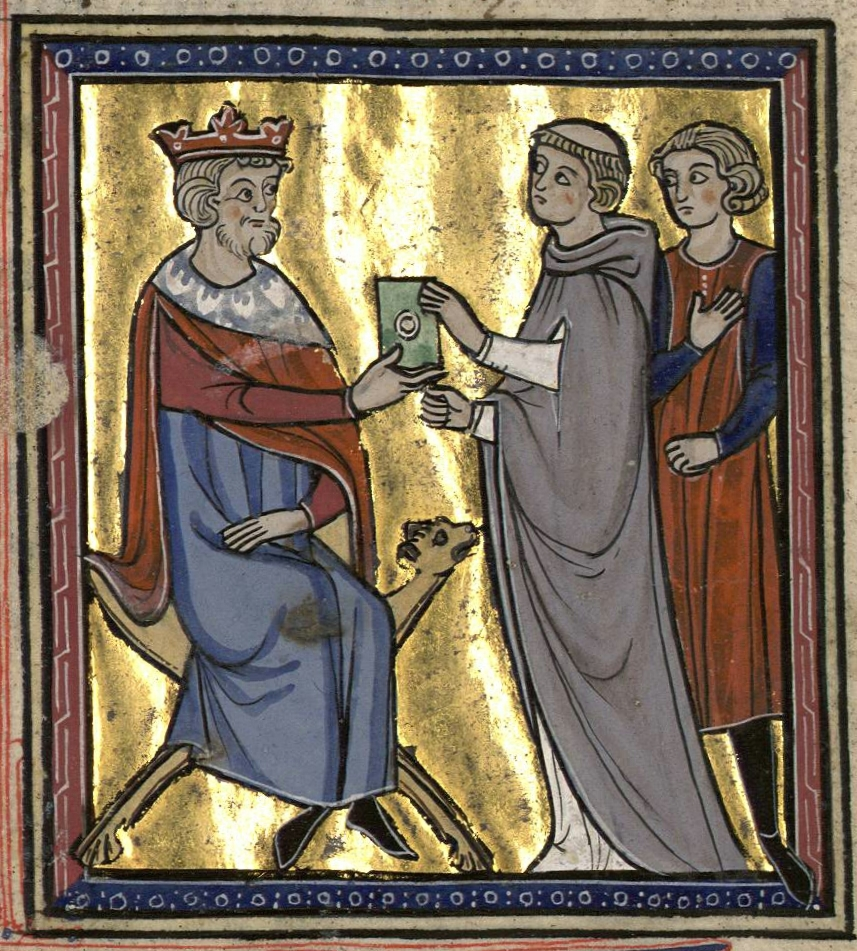
Manuel I Komnenus and the messengers of Amalric I of Jerusalem.

Bertha of Sulzbach (Note: In German: Bertha von Sulzbach; In Greek Βέρθα του Ζούλτσμπαχ, Bertha tou Zoultsbach) (1110s – 1160), also known as Irene, was a Byzantine empress by marriage to Byzantine Emperor Manuel I Komnenos.

== Life ==
She was born in Sulzbach, a daughter of Berengar II, Count of Sulzbach (c. 1080 – 3 December 1125) and his second spouse Adelheid of Wolfratshausen. He was one of the rulers who signed the Concordat of Worms.

=== Empress ===
Emissaries of the Byzantine emperor John II Komnenos arrived in Germany, seeking an alliance against Roger II of Sicily. To seal the alliance, the emissaries requested that Conrad send a princess of his family to be married to the emperor's son, Manuel. Instead, Conrad selected his sister-in-law, Bertha, and after legally adopting her as his daughter, sent her to the Byzantine Empire escorted by Embricho, the Bishop of Würzburg.

By the time Bertha arrived at the Imperial court in Constantinople, the emperor John was dead, and his son Manuel was now the reigning emperor. Manuel delayed marrying her for three years, until shortly after Epiphany 1146, at which point she became empress and was renamed "Irene/Eireni" (Εἰρήνη), a common name for foreign-born princesses. As an introduction for her to the Hellenic culture she was marrying into, John Tzetzes wrote his Allegories on the Iliad.

Bertha-Irene was noted for shunning the frivolity of the luxurious Byzantine court; Basil of Ochrid, the archbishop of Thessalonica, praised her for her modesty and piety, and Nicetas Choniates (53sq.) noted that she did not wear face-paint. The patriarch of Constantinople, Cosmas II Atticus, who had been accused of heresy, allegedly cursed Bertha-Ireneʻs womb in 1147 to prevent her bearing a son. This resulted in violence when the panhypersebastos Stephanos Kontostephanos attempted to attack the patriarch, likely as a way of demonstrating that the loyalty of the Kontostephanoi was with Manuel. Bertha-Irene proved to be a capable regent when Manuel was away in Syria in 1158–1159, and was instrumental in dismantling a conspiracy by Theodore Styppeiotes and recapturing the future emperor Andronikos I Komnenos after he escaped from prison.

The precise date of Bertha-Irene's death is uncertain, but it seems likely that she died in Constantinople in summer 1160. Basil of Ochrid's funeral oration for her suggests the empire was at peace on all fronts, and the war with the Sultanate of Rum had only been concluded in mid-1160. Her husband Manuel was described as "roaring like a lion" in grief at her death, despite his infidelities during her lifetime. He remarried, in 1161 or 1162, to Maria of Antioch.

== Issue ==
She and Manuel had two daughters:

1. Maria Comnena (1152–1182), who married Renier of Montferrat
2. Anna Comnena (1154–1158)

== Sources ==
- Chalandon, Ferdinand (1923). "The Later Comneni". In Tanner, J.R.; Previte-Orton, C.W.; Brooke, Z.N. (eds.). The Cambridge Medieval History:The Eastern Roman Empire. Vol. IV. The Macmillan Company.
- Freed, John B. (2016). Frederick Barbarossa: The Prince and the Myth. Yale University Press.
- Kresten, Otto (1978). "Zum Sturz des Theodoros Styppeiotes" [On the Downfall of Theodore Styppeiotes]. Jahrbuch der Österreichischen Byzantinistik (in German). 27: 49–103.
- Magdalino, Paul (1993). The Empire of Manuel I Komnenos, 1143–1180. Cambridge University Press.
- McMahon, Lucas (2024). "Anna Komnene, the Kontostephanoi, and the Norman invasions of 1107–1108 and 1147–1149". Byzantinische Zeitschrift. 117 (3): 693–734. doi:10.1515/bz-2024-1170304.
- McMahon, Lucas (2025). "Manuel I Komnenos' policy towards the Sultanate of Rum and John Kontostephanos' embassies to Jerusalem, 1159–61". Crusades. 24 (1): 47–66. doi:10.1080/14765276.2024.2405810.

Bertha of Sulzbach House of Babenberg Born: 1110s Died: 1159
Royal titles
Preceded by Irene of Hungary	Byzantine Empress consort 1146–1159	Succeeded by Maria of Antioch
