= Conrad III of Germany =

King of Germany from 1138 to 1152

Conrad III
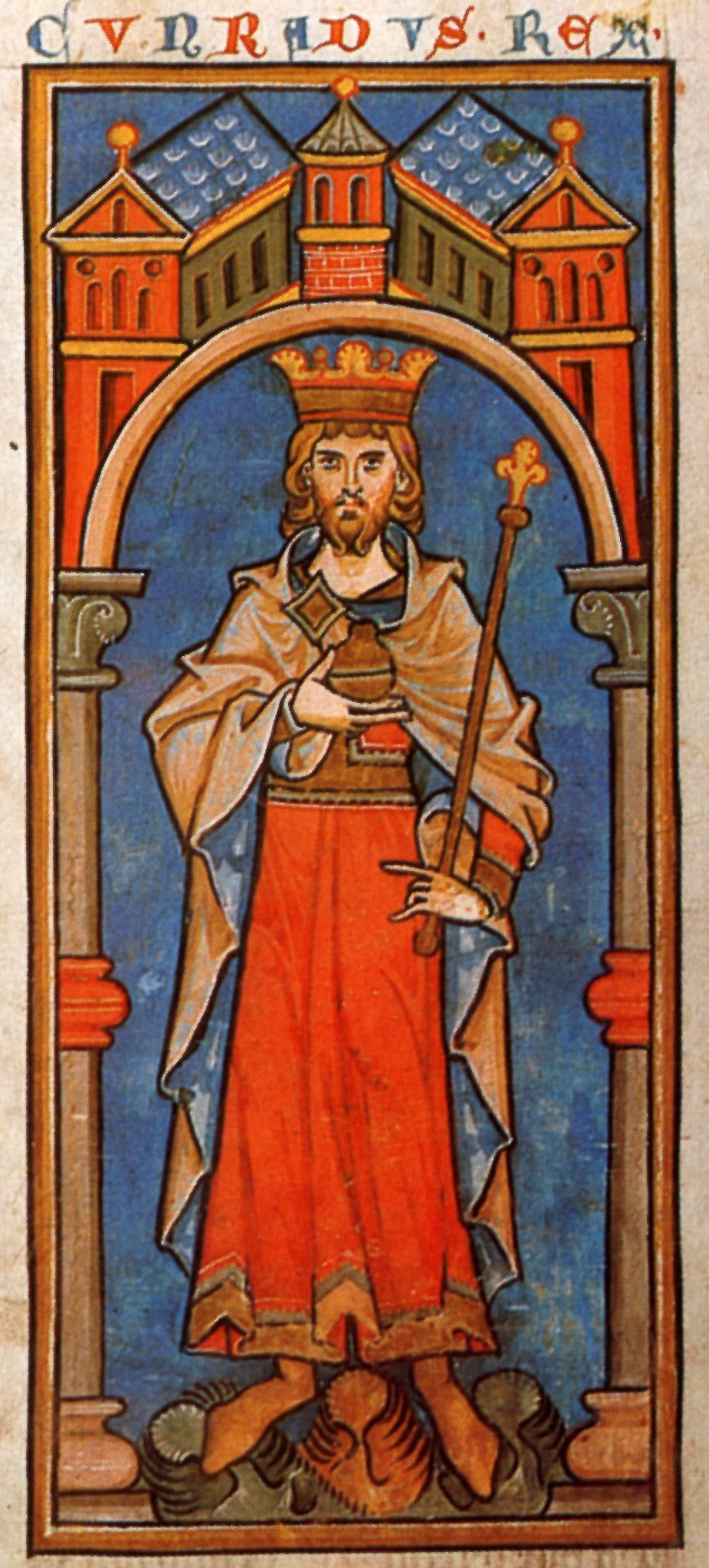
- A miniature from the Chronica sancti Pantaleonis, c. 1240

King of Germany (formally King of the Romans)
- Reign: 7 March 1138 – 15 February 1152
- Coronation: 13 March 1138, Aachen
- Predecessor: Lothair III
- Successor: Frederick I

King of Italy
- Reign: 1128–1135
- Coronation: 29 June 1128, Milan
- Predecessor: Henry V
- Successor: Frederick I
- Born: 1093 or 1094
- Died: 15 February 1152 (aged 59–60); Bamberg, Bavaria
- Burial: Bamberg Cathedral
- Spouse: Gertrude of Comburg; Gertrude of Sulzbach
- Issue: Henry Berengar; Frederick IV, Duke of Swabia
- House: Hohenstaufen
- Father: Frederick I, Duke of Swabia
- Mother: Agnes of Germany

Conrad III (German: Konrad; Italian: Corrado; 1093 or 1094 – 15 February 1152) of the Hohenstaufen dynasty was from 1116 to 1120 Duke of Franconia, from 1127 to 1135 anti-king of his predecessor Lothair III, and from 1138 until his death in 1152 King of the Romans in the Holy Roman Empire. He was the son of Duke Frederick I of Swabia and Agnes, daughter of Emperor Henry IV.

His reign saw the start of the conflicts between the Guelphs and Ghibellines. He was involved in the failed Second Crusade with Louis VII, where he would fight and lose at Doryleum and would later fall ill and return to Constantinople. After recuperating, he went to Jerusalem but would experience a string of failed sieges. Later returning from the Crusade, he was entangled in some conflicts with Welf VI's claim to the Duchy of Bavaria. On his deathbed, he designated his nephew Frederick Barbarossa as his successor instead of his son, Frederick IV, Duke of Swabia.

== Descent ==
The origin of the House of Hohenstaufen in the Duchy of Swabia has not been conclusively established. As the name came from the Hohenstaufen Castle (built in 1105) Conrad's great-grandfather Frederick of Staufen was a count in the Riesgau and in 1053 became Swabian Count palatine. His son Frederick of Buren probably resided near present-day Wäschenbeuren and about 1050 married Countess Hildegard of Egisheim from Alsace.

Conrad's father took advantage of the conflict between King Henry IV of Germany and the Swabian duke Rudolf of Rheinfelden during the Investiture Controversy. When Rudolf had himself elected German anti-king at Forchheim in 1077, Frederick of Hohenstaufen remained loyal to the royal crown and in 1079 was vested with the Duchy of Swabia by Henry IV, including an engagement with the king's daughter Agnes. He died in 1105, leaving two sons, Conrad and his elder brother Frederick II, who inherited the Swabian ducal title. Their mother entered into a second marriage with Babenberg margrave Leopold III of Austria.

== Biography ==
In 1105, Henry IV, Holy Roman Emperor since 1084, was overthrown by his son Henry V, Conrad's uncle. Emperor since 1111, Henry V prepared for his second campaign to Italy upon the death of Margravine Matilda of Tuscany, and in 1116 he appointed Conrad as Duke of Franconia. Conrad was marked out to act as regent for Germany, together with his elder brother, Duke Frederick II of Swabia. At the death of Henry V in 1125, Conrad unsuccessfully supported Frederick II for the kingship of Germany. Frederick was placed under a ban and Conrad was deprived of Franconia and the Kingdom of Burgundy, of which he was rector. With the support of the imperial cities, Swabia, and the Margraviate of Austria, Conrad was elected anti-king at Nuremberg in December 1127.

Conrad quickly crossed the Alps to be crowned King of Italy by Anselmo della Pusterla, Archbishop of Milan, in the village of Monza. Over the next two years, he failed to achieve anything in Italy, however, and returned to Germany in 1130, after Nuremberg and Speyer, two strong cities that supported him, fell to Lothair in 1129. Conrad continued in Lothair's opposition, but he and Frederick were forced to acknowledge Lothair as emperor in 1135, during which time Conrad relinquished his title as King of Italy. After this they were pardoned and could take again possession of their lands.

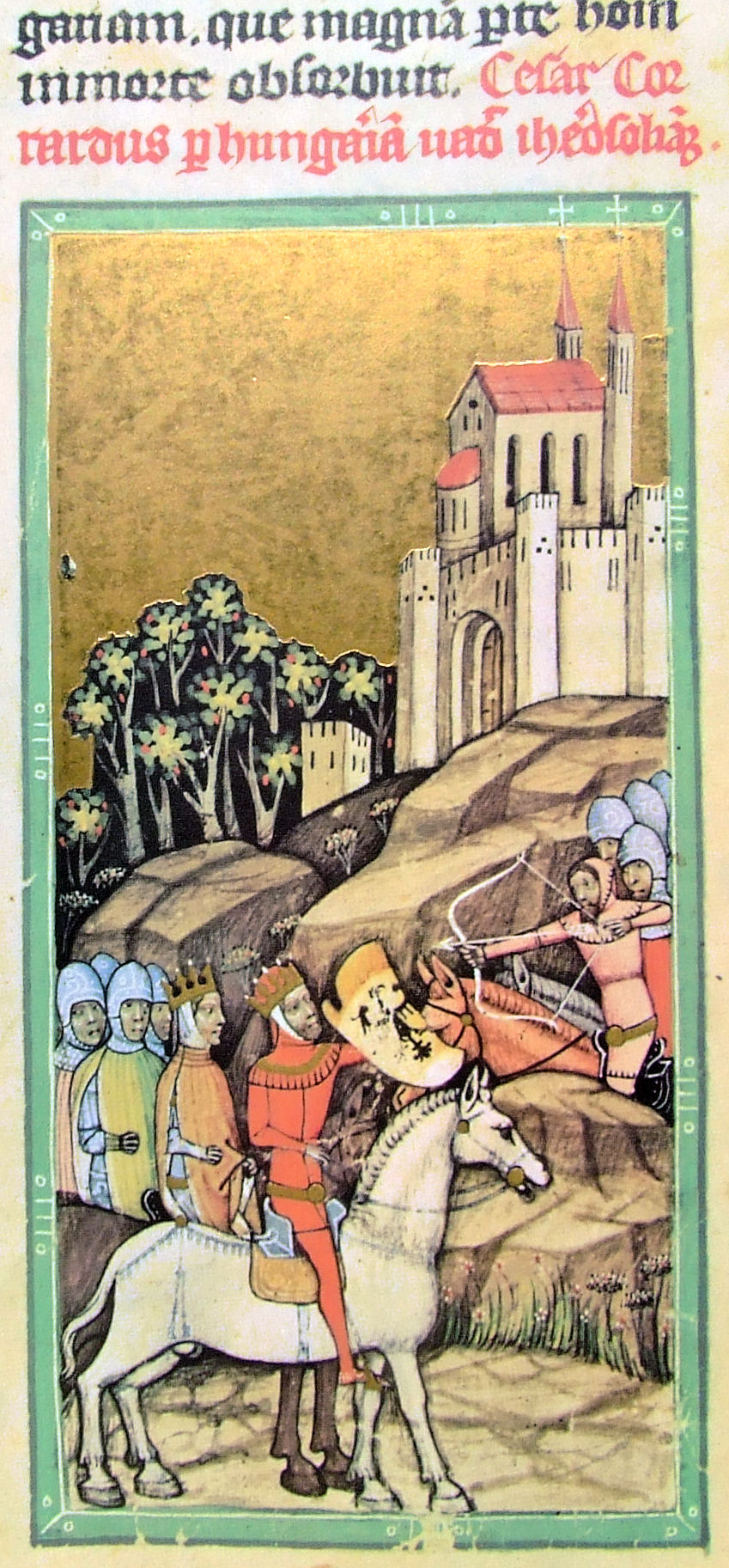
Conrad III and his armies in Hungary. Image from the Chronicon Pictum

After Lothair's death (December 1137), Conrad was elected king at Coblenz on 7 March 1138, in the presence of the papal legate Theodwin. Conrad was crowned at Aachen six days later (13 March) and was acknowledged in Bamberg by several princes of southern Germany. As Henry the Proud, son-in-law and heir of Lothair and the most powerful prince in Germany, who had been passed over in the election, refused to do the same, Conrad deprived him of all his territories, giving the Duchy of Saxony to Albert the Bear and that of Bavaria to Leopold IV, Margrave of Austria. Henry, however, retained the loyalty of his subjects. The civil war that broke out is considered the first act of the struggle between Guelphs and Ghibellines, which later extended southwards to Italy. After Henry's death (October 1139), the war was continued by his son Henry the Lion, supported by the Saxons, and by his brother Welf VI. Conrad, after a long siege, defeated the latter at Weinsberg in December 1140, and in May 1142 a peace agreement was reached in Frankfurt.

In the same year, Conrad entered Bohemia to reinstate his brother-in-law Vladislav II as Duke. The attempt to do the same with another brother-in-law, the Polish prince Ladislaus the Exile, failed. Bavaria, Saxony, and the other regions of Germany were in revolt.

In 1146, Conrad heard Bernard of Clairvaux preach the Second Crusade at Speyer, and he agreed to join Louis VII in a great expedition to the Holy Land. At the imperial diet in Frankfurt in March 1147 Conrad and the assembled princes entrusted Bernard of Clairvaux with the recruitment for the Wendish crusade.

Before leaving, he had the nobles elect and crown his son Henry Berengar king. The succession secured in the event of his death, Conrad set out. His army of 20,000 men went overland, via Hungary, causing disruptions in the Byzantine territories through which they passed. They arrived at Constantinople by September 1147, ahead of the French army.

Rather than taking the coastal road around Anatolia through Christian-held territory, by which he sent most of his noncombatants, Conrad took his army across Anatolia. On 25 October 1147, they were defeated by the Seljuk Turks at the Battle of Dorylaeum. Conrad and most of the knights escaped, but most of the foot soldiers were killed or captured. The remaining 2,000 men of the German army limped on to Nicaea, where many of the survivors deserted and tried to return home. Conrad and his adherents had to be escorted to Lopadium by the French, where they joined the main French army under Louis. Conrad fell seriously ill at Ephesus and was sent to recuperate in Constantinople, where his host the Byzantine Emperor Manuel I Comnenus acted as his personal physician. After recovering, Conrad sailed to Acre, and from there reached Jerusalem. He participated in the ill-fated Siege of Damascus and after that failure, grew disaffected with his allies. Another attempt to attack Ascalon failed when Conrad's allies did not appear as promised, then Conrad returned to Germany, through Constantinople, where he met again with the Byzantine Emperor Manuel I to discuss the problem of two emperors, and to renew their alliance against Roger II of Sicily.

In 1150, Conrad and Henry Berengar defeated Welf VI and his son Welf VII at the Battle of Flochberg. Henry Berengar died later that year and the succession was thrown open. The Welfs and Hohenstaufen made peace in 1152 and the peaceful succession of one of Conrad's family was secured.

Conrad was never crowned emperor and continued to style himself "King of the Romans" until his death. On his deathbed, in the presence of only two witnesses, his nephew Frederick Barbarossa and the Bishop of Bamberg, he allegedly designated Frederick his successor, rather than his own surviving six-year-old son Frederick. Frederick Barbarossa, who had accompanied his uncle on the unfortunate crusade, forcefully pursued his advantage and was duly elected king in Cologne a few weeks later. The young son of the late king was given the Duchy of Swabia.

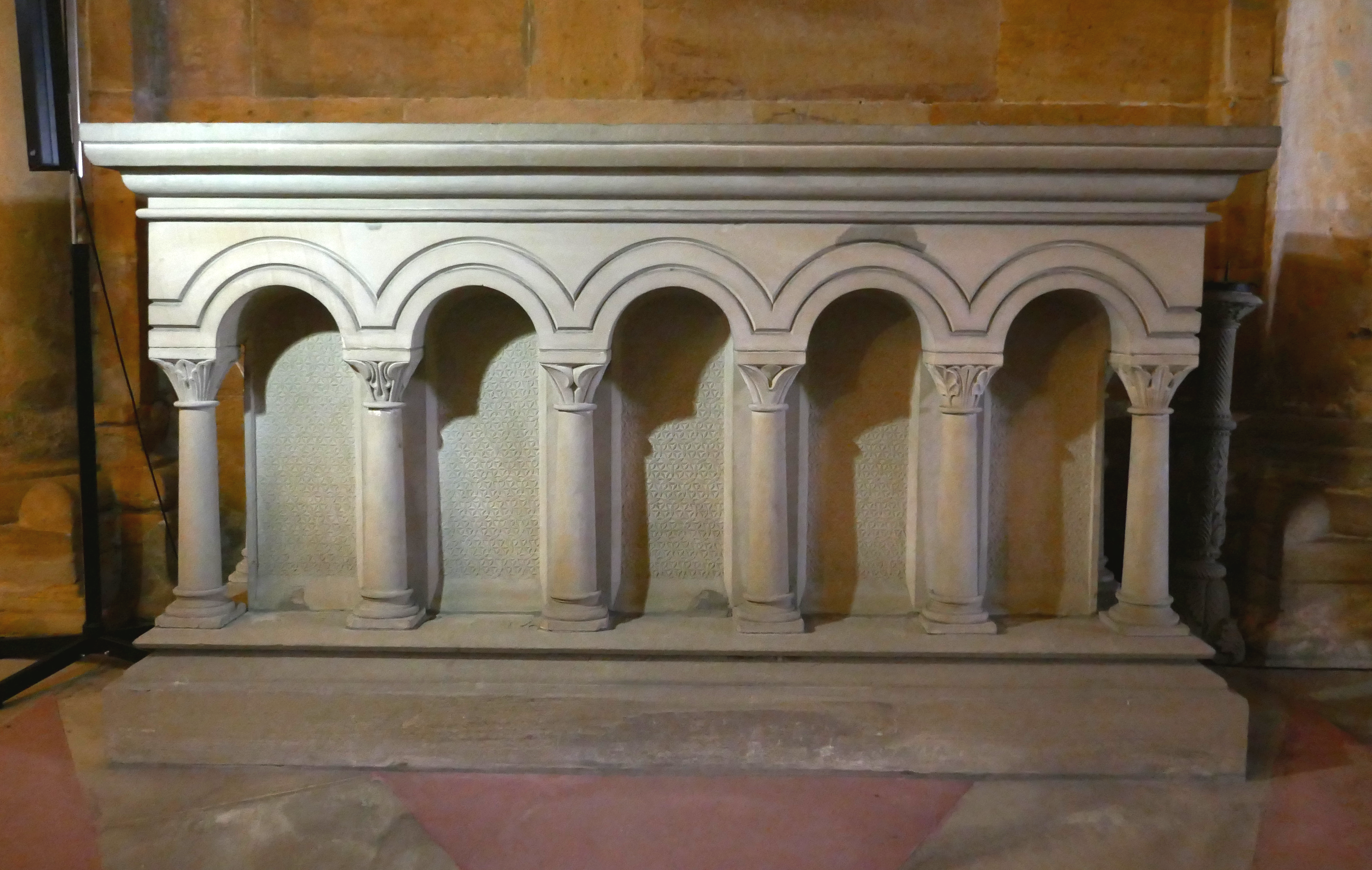
Tomb of King Conrad III in the Bamberg Cathedral

Conrad left no male heirs by his first wife, Gertrude von Komburg. In 1136, he married Gertrude of Sulzbach, who was a daughter of Berengar II of Sulzbach, and whose sister Bertha was married to the Byzantine Emperor Manuel I. Gertrude was the mother of Conrad's children and the link which cemented his alliance with Byzantium.

== See also ==
- Kings of Germany family tree

== Sources ==
- Baldwin, M. W. A History of the Crusades: the first hundred years, 1969.
- Barber, Malcolm (2004). The Two Cities: Medieval Europe 1050–1320. Routledge.
- Bernhardi, Wilhelm (1883). Konrad III: Jahrbücher der Deutschen Geschichte. Leipzig: Duncker & Humblot. (in German)
- Frederick I (2000). The Crusade of Frederick Barbarossa: The History of the Expedition of the Emperor Frederick and related texts. Translated by Loud, G.A. Ashgate Publishing.
- Magdalino, Paul (2004). "The Byzantine Empire (1118–1204)". In Luscombe, David; Riley-Smith, Jonathan (eds.). The New Cambridge Medieval History, Volume 4, c.1024–c.1198, Part 1. Cambridge: Cambridge University Press. pp. 611–643. ISBN 978-1-13905402-7.
- Marina, Areli (2013). "The Langobard Revival of Matteo il Magno Visconti, Lord of Milan". I Tatti Studies in the Italian Renaissance. 16 (1/2 September). University of Chicago Press: 377–414. doi:10.1086/673405. S2CID 194035594.
- Otto I of Freising (1953). The Deeds of Frederick Barbarossa. Translated by Mierow, Charles Christopher. Columbia University Press.
- Petersohn, Jürgen (2010). Kaisertum und Rom in spätsalischer und staufischer Zeit. Romidee und Rompolitik von Heinrich V. bis Friedrich II (in German). Hannover: Hahnsche Buchhandlung. ISBN 978-3-7752-5762-6.
- Suger (2018). Selected Works of Abbot Suger of Saint Denis. Translated by Cusimano, Richard; Whitmore, Eric. The Catholic University of America Press.
- Tyerman, Christopher (2006). God's War: A New History of the Crusade. The Belknap Press.
- Ziegler, W. König Konrad III. (1138–1152). Hof, Urkunden und Politik (= Forschungen zur Kaiser- und Papstgeschichte des Mittelalters. Band 26) Böhlau, Wien u. a. 2008
- Roche, Jason T (2021). The crusade of King Conrad III of Germany: warfare and diplomacy in Byzantium, Anatolia and Outremer, 1146–1149. Brepols. ISBN 978-2-503-53038-3. OCLC 1252629980.

Conrad III of Germany House of Hohenstaufen Born: 1093 Died: 1152
Regnal titles
Preceded by Henry V	King of Italy; 1128–1135	Succeeded by Frederick I
Preceded by Lothair III	German King (formally King of the Romans) (with Henry Berengar (1147–1150); 1138–1152	Succeeded by Frederick I
