= Wulfhild =

Wulfhild, also spelled Wulfhilda or Wulfhilde, is a Germanic female name.

- Wulfhild (d. after 996) was an English nun, abbess of Barking and Horton.
- Wulfhild (1020 – 24 May 1071) was a Norwegian princess, daughter of King Olaf II of Norway and wife of Ordulf, Duke of Saxony.
- Wulfhild (1072 – 29 December 1126) was a Saxon princess, daughter of Magnus, Duke of Saxony and wife of Henry IX, Duke of Bavaria.
