= Peace of Bautzen =

1018 treaty ending the German-Polish territorial conflicts of the time

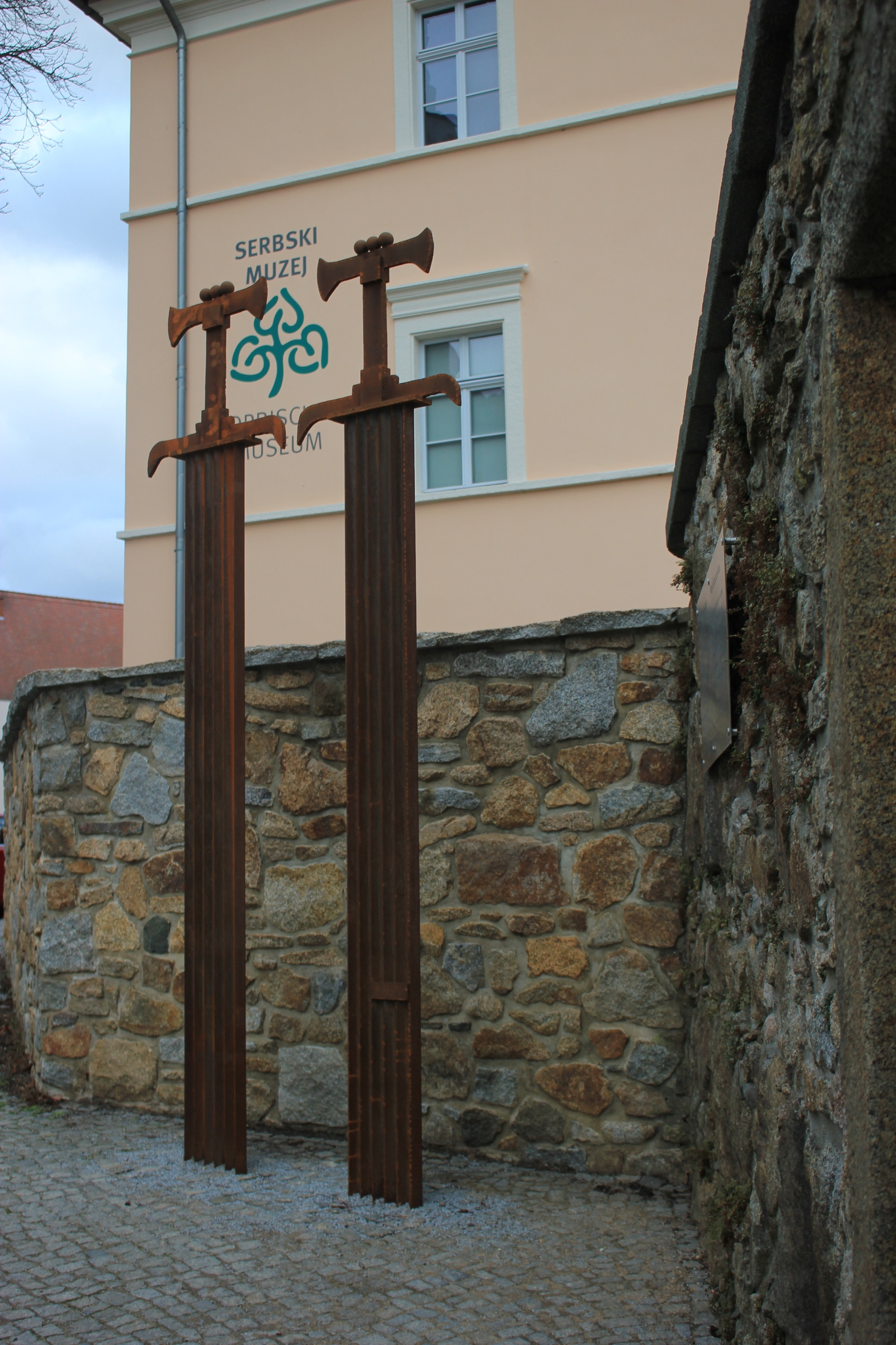
- Memorial in Bautzen
- Type: Peace treaty
- Signed: 30 January 1018
- Location: Budziszyn, Poland (now Bautzen, Germany)
- Parties: Duchy of Poland Holy Roman Empire

The Peace of Bautzen (German: Frieden von Bautzen; Polish: Pokój w Budziszynie; Upper Sorbian: Budyski měr) was a treaty concluded on 30 January 1018, between Holy Roman Emperor Henry II and Bolesław I of Poland which ended a series of Polish-German wars over the control of Lusatia and Upper Lusatia (Milzenerland or Milsko, the eastern part of the margraviate of Meissen (Miśnia)) as well as Bohemia, Moravia and Slovakia.

Bolesław had enjoyed the close friendship of the emperor Otto III and after his death supported one of Otto's followers, Eckard I, Margrave of Meissen for the position of Holy Roman Emperor, against the claims of Henry II. After both emperor Otto III and Eckard's death in 1002, Bolesław conquered Eckard's domain of Meissen, as well as the march of Lusatia. Once Henry secured his position within Germany, an agreement was reached which left Bolesław with Lusatia and Upper Lusatia while the Polish duke in turn recognized Henry as Holy Roman Emperor.

Fighting soon resumed, however, after an unsuccessful assassination attempt against Bolesław—which he believed had been ordered by Henry, who denied the charge—occurred soon after the peace was concluded. Bolesław took control of Bohemia, having previously acquired Moravia and Slovakia. In the ensuing struggle Bolesław allied himself with the Holy Roman Empire's noble opposition to Henry, while the emperor sought support among the Lutici, a Slavic pagan Polabian tribe. An intermediate peace was concluded in Merseburg in 1013 which preserved the territorial status quo, with Bolesław holding on to Moravia and Slovakia, while Jaromir was made the ruler of Bohemia (though he was soon deposed by his brother Oldrich). Bolesław however agreed to support the Emperor's Italian campaign. Open warfare continued when Bolesław I did not comply with this condition, and instead supported Henry II's Italian adversaries. Henry II was however unable to defeat Bolesław I, and agreed on a peace in Bautzen (1018) which left the Duke of Poland in charge of the Lusatian march and Upper Lusatia. The two rulers also strengthened the dynastic bonds between them through Bolesław's marriage with Oda, first daughter of Margrave Eckard. The emperor also promised to aid Bolesław in his intervention in the Kievan succession crisis in the summer of 1018 with contingents of German and Hungarian troops which enabled the Polish ruler to capture Kiev and reclaim the previously lost Cherven Cities.

== Prelude ==
=== Merseburg (1002) ===
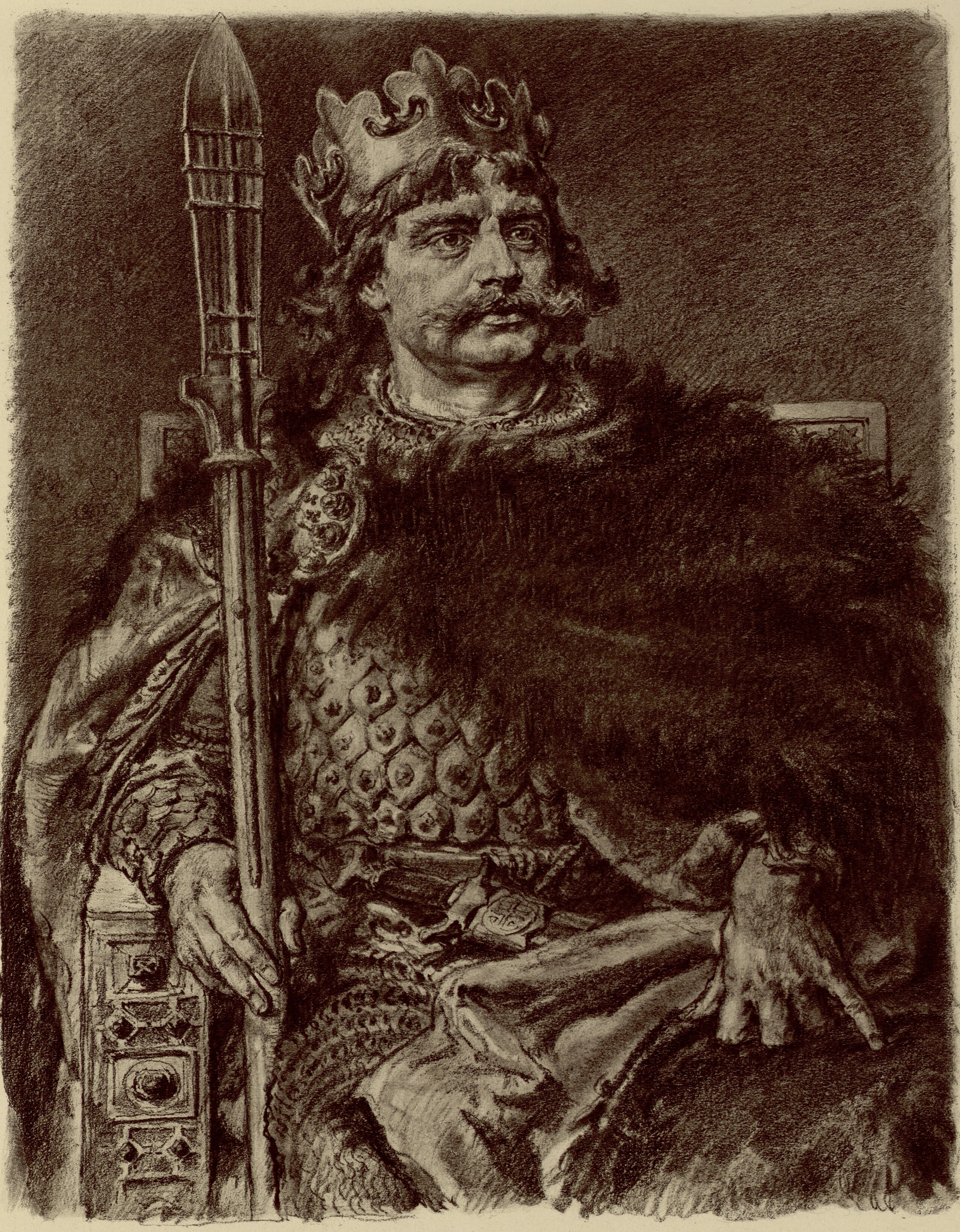
Bolesław I of Poland in a drawing by Jan Matejko

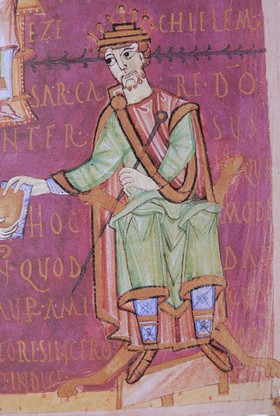
Henry II, Holy Roman Emperor

After the death of emperor Otto III, Bavarian duke Henry IV and Meissen margrave Eckard (Ekkehard) I competed for succession. When Eckard I was murdered on 30 April 1002 in Pöhlde, Polish duke Bolesław I, who had supported Eckard's candidature, took over the Margraviate of Meissen and March Lusatia (Lower Lusatia), lands only recently conquered by Germans and still inhabited mostly by Slavs, probably with approval from Eckard's family. He took control of both Bautzen and Meissen, after the inhabitants themselves had forced the German troops to leave the city, while other German knights voluntarily recognized Bolesław's rule in the region. Meanwhile, Henry IV had consolidated his rule against rival candidates, and, as Henry II, was crowned king of Germany in June.

On 25 July 1002 at a Hoftag (imperial meeting) held in Merseburg, the dispute was settled as follows:

- Henry II gave the Lusatian march and the eastern part of the Meissen march (Milsko or Milzenerland, Upper Lusatia) to Bolesław I as a fief,
- Bolesław I had to return the truncated Margraviate of Meissen,
- Bolesław I pledged allegiance to Henry II together with the Saxon nobles.

When Bolesław I left Merseburg, he was ambushed, but due to the aid of Henry of Schweinfurt and Saxon duke Bernard (Bernhard) I, he was able to repulse the attack. Henry II did neither protect him, nor punish the assailants.

=== Poznań (1005) ===
In 1003, Bolesław I conquered the Duchy of Bohemia, imprisoned its Přemyslid duke, Boleslaus III, and denied Henry II the oath of allegiance for the duchy. Henry II did not accept this, and was determined to contest the Polish claims to the Bohemian duchy. Bolesław I had further allied with the noble German opposition to Henry II. This alliance included Henry of Schweinfurt, his cousin Ernst as well as Henry II's brother Brun (Bruno), bishop of Augsburg, all of which fled to Bolesław's court when their rebellion against Henry II failed. While Bolesław I could draw upon the support of many secular Saxon nobles, Henry II could rely on the Saxon clergy. Also in 1003, Henry II allied with the pagan Lutici against Bolesław I, and in 1004 launched a campaign against the latter. In the course of this campaign, Henry II evicted Bolesław I from Bohemia and granted it to the Přemyslid duke Jaromir in 1004, before he besieged and took Bautzen from Bolesław I's forces and incorporated it into the Duchy of Saxony. A few months later, together with Veleti and Czech allies, Henry II mounted another campaign. He crossed the Oder near Krosno and advanced into Greater Poland. Bolesław however avoided an open battle, harried the emperor's troops with guerrilla tactics and caused "great losses", according to contemporary German chroniclers. The fighting was concluded in 1005 when Tagino, Archbishop of Magdeburg mediated a peace near Poznań, as a result of which Poland had to give up Lusatia and Meissen but kept Slovakia and Moravia for the time being.

The peace was temporary, as neither was Henry II ready to grant Bolesław I a more elevated status than the one of an ordinary vassal, nor did the latter abandon his desire for such a position or accept Henry II's power as immediate to God, as his self-perception was similar in this respect.

=== Merseburg (1013) ===
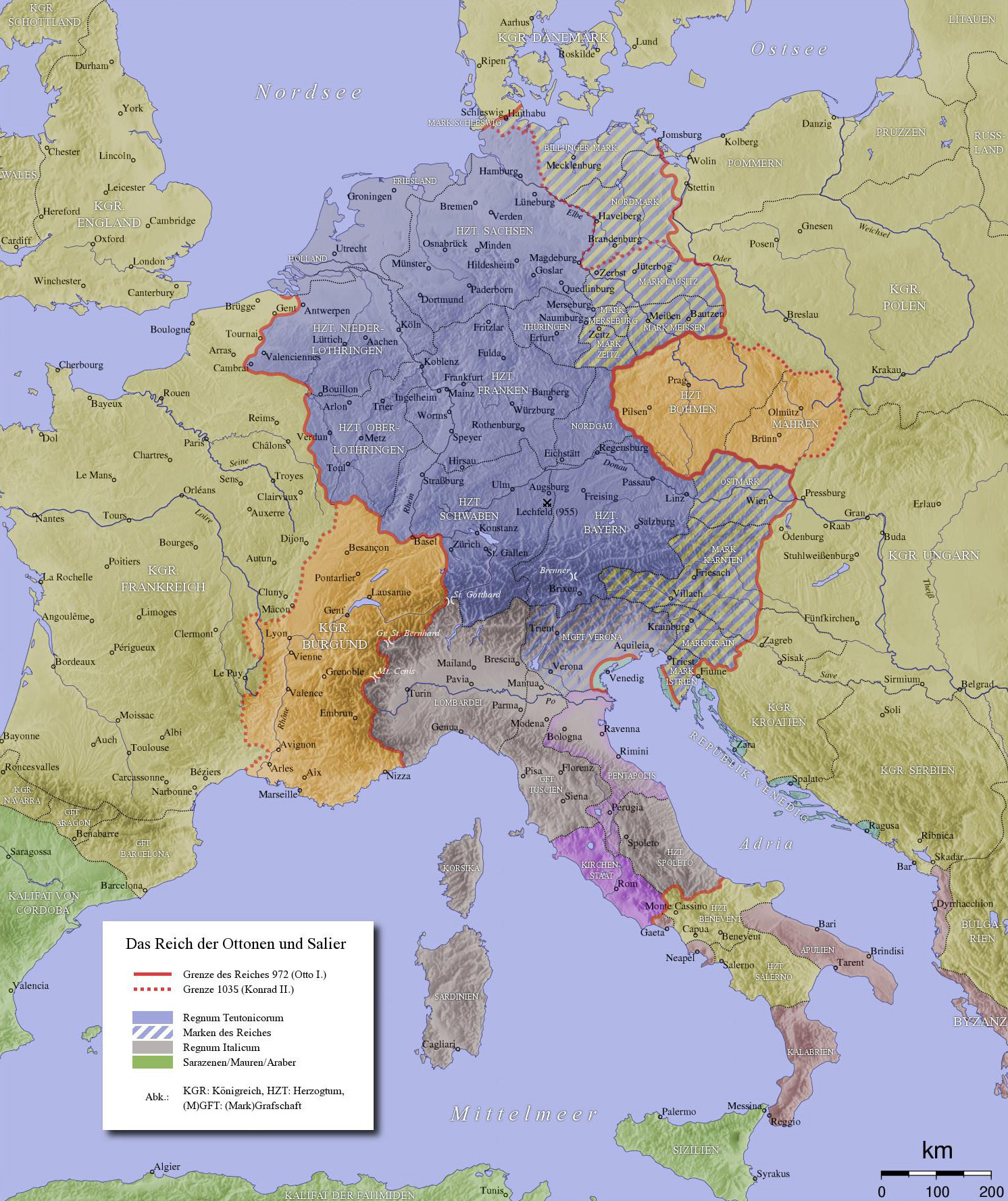
Holy Roman Empire under the Ottonian dynasty, marches dashed.

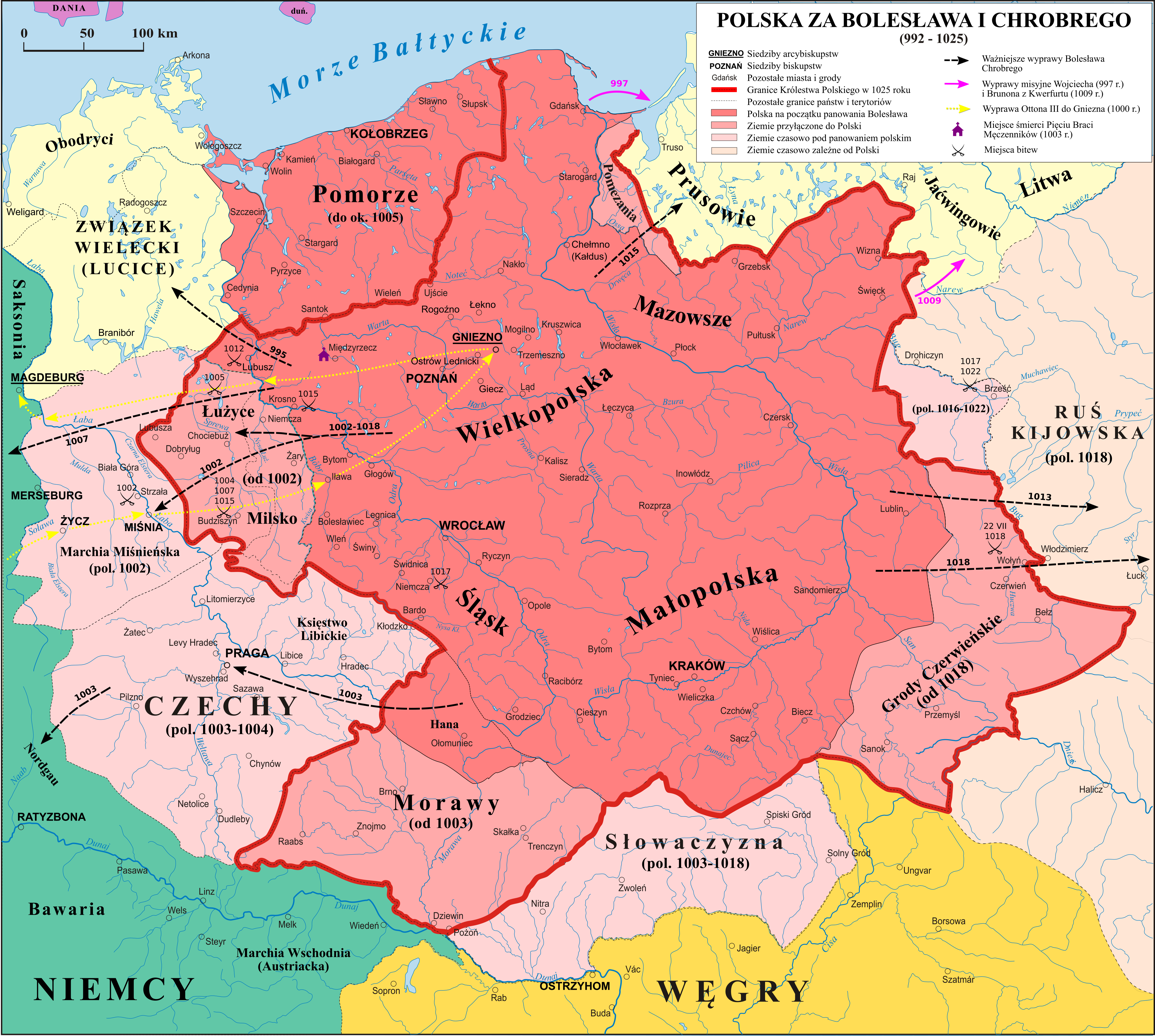
Greatest extent of Bolesław I's realm. Lusatian march indicated as Łużyce, Upper Lusatia as Milsko, Bautzen as Budziszyn.

Despite the peace of Poznan, warfare between Bolesław I and Henry II continued between 1007 and 1013. In 1007, Bolesław I again took control of Lusatia with the fortress of Bautzen. A campaign led by Henry II in 1010 was unsuccessful. During this campaign, which started in Belgern, Henry II was struck by an illness at Jarina castle and returned with some of his bishops, while the remaining armies devastated the surrounding area. A Saxon campaign in 1012 was also unsuccessful. Henry II had mobilized the Saxon nobility to mount campaigns in his name, since he needed a peace agreement before 1013, when his coronation in Rome was scheduled.

Thus, in 1013, Bolesław I and Henry II agreed on a peace in Merseburg:

- Henry II again gave the Lusatian march and Upper Lusatia to Bolesław I as a fief,
- Bolesław I again pledged allegiance to Henry II,
- Bolesław I promised to support Henry II's campaign to Rome,
- Henry II promised to support Bolesław I's campaign to Kiev with 500 knights.

The treaty was confirmed by the marriage of Richeza, a niece of Otto III, to Mieszko II, a son of Bolesław I. During the ceremony Bolesław I carried the sword for Henry II.

Bolesław I however did not aid Henry II in his Italian campaign, and refused to recognize that Lusatia and Upper Lusatia were his only as fiefs. Instead, he supported Crescentian antipope Gregory VI and intrigued against Henry II in Italy, who had denied Gregory his support in Pöhlde. Henry II started his Italian campaign in the fall of 1013, defeated the allies of the Crescentians and had pope Benedict VIII crown him Holy Roman Emperor in Rome on 14 February 1014. Bohemian duke Oldřich meanwhile captured Bolesław I's son, Mieszko, and turned him over to Henry II, who however released him.

== Bautzen (1018) ==
=== Military operations and political background ===
In July 1015, Henry II with his Lutician allies renewed the war against Bolesław I on the basis of the latter's failure to support him in Italy. The campaign started in Magdeburg, from where Henry II's army crossed through Lusatia to Krosno, where two other armies commanded by Bernard II of Saxony and Oldřich of Bohemia were supposed to join him. The plan failed however, as Bolesław's maneuvers prevented the two armies from joining up. During the fighting Margrave Gero, as well as two hundred other German knights were killed by Polish bowmen and Bolesław allowed the Bishop of Meissen, Eido, to recover the bodies for burial. As a result of these setbacks Henry II withdrew. Subsequent negotiations with Bolesław I failed. In 1017, Henry II marched an army from Leitzkau to Głogów, where Bolesław I awaited him, but chose not to besiege the city as it was too strongly fortified. Instead Henry besieged nearby Niemcza, however, Polish reinforcements managed to enter the city on two occasions and the siege was without success. The contemporary German chronicler Thietmar of Merseburg, generally ill-disposed towards Poles, on this occasion commented on the bravery and skill of the defenders, noting that they neither cheered when they were successful, nor lamented when they suffered a setback. The inhabitants of the city also erected a cross on the wall which faced the pagan Lutician allies of the emperor. Eventually, due to an illness of part of his army Henry aborted the siege and withdrew, taking the route to Bohemia because the way back into Germany was blocked by Boleslaw's main forces, stationed at Wrocław.

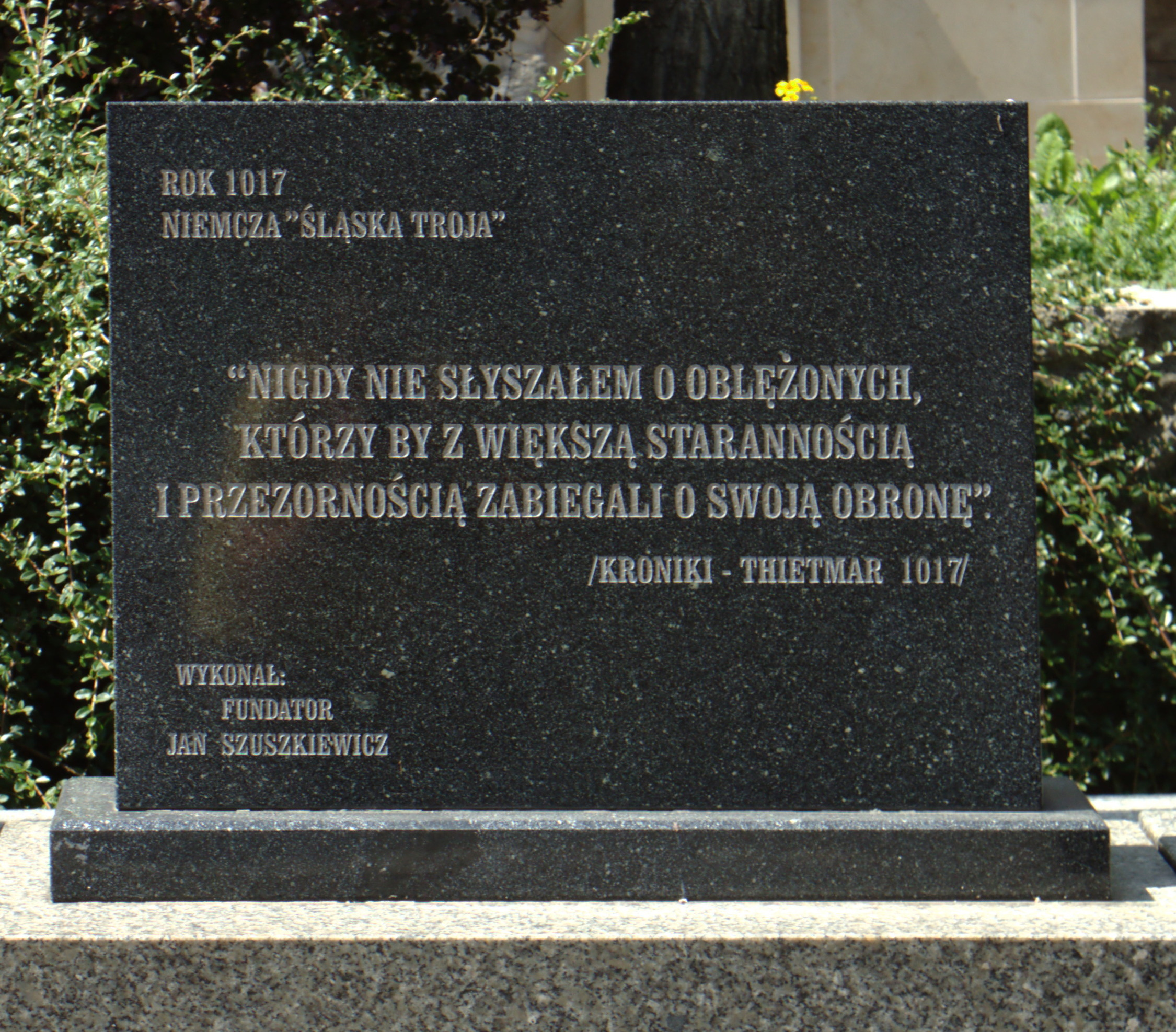
Memorial to the successful Polish defense of Niemcza in 1017

During these campaigns, Henry II was confronted with the opposition of part of the Saxon nobility, including the House of Billung, who maintained good relations and were in part relatives of Bolesław I. In 1017, Henry II therefore addressed Bolesław I as "public enemy" (hostis publicus) and forbade further contacts with him. At the end of 1017, Polish troops invaded German land between the Mulde and Elbe rivers.

=== The treaty ===
On 30 January 1018, peace was made in Budziszyn (now Bautzen). Bolesław I kept the Lusatian march and Upper Lusatia (Milsko/Milzenerland). Thietmar, the principal German chronicler of the time, did not give precise details as to the conditions on which Bolesław retained these lands. According to German historian Schneidmuller, he held them as an imperial fief. According to Polish historian Paweł Jasienica, the lands were held without any obligation towards the empire. The Cambridge Medieval History states that they were Bolesław's on "purely nominal terms of vassalage".

The contemporary German chronicler Thietmar, who was generally ill-disposed towards Poles, commented on the peace with the words "non ut decuit sed sicut fieri potuit", meaning "not as it should have been but as was possible in the circumstances".

Both parties also exchanged hostages. Henry II did not attend, and did not renew the campaigns against Bolesław I thereafter. The peace was confirmed by the marriage of Oda of Meissen, daughter of Eckard I, to Bolesław I. It was Bolesław I's fourth marriage; Regelind, a daughter from his previous marriage with Emnilda, was already married to Oda's brother Herman I of Meissen.

Henry also obliged himself to support Bolesław with three hundred knights in the Polish ruler's expedition to Kiev in the same year.

== Sources ==
Bibliography

- Berger, Sabine (2002). "Karte der Polenzüge Heinrichs II gegen Boleslaw Chrobry". In Kirmeier, Josef; Schneidmüller, Bernd; Weinfurter, Stefan; et al. (eds.). Kaiser Heinrich II. 1002–1024. Veröffentlichungen zur Bayerischen Geschichte und Kultur (in German). Vol. 44. Theiss. pp. 224–226. ISBN 3-8062-1712-2. Archived from the original on 2016-03-03.
- Bernhardt, John W (1993). Itinerant Kingship and Royal Monasteries in Early Medieval Germany, c. 936–1075. Cambridge University Press. ISBN 0-521-52183-1.
- Herbers, Klaus; Neuhaus, Helmut (2005). Das Heilige Römische Reich (in German). Böhlau. ISBN 3-412-23405-2.
- Jasienica, Paweł (2007). Polska Piastów (in Polish). Prószyński Media. ISBN 978-83-7648-284-2.
- Keller, Hagen (2001). Die Ottonen (in German) (3 ed.). Beck. ISBN 3-406-44746-5.
- Knefelkamp, Ulrich (2002). Das Mittelalter. UTB M (in German). Vol. 2105 (2 ed.). UTB. ISBN 3-8252-2105-9.
- Röckelein, Hedwig (2006). "Heiraten – ein Instrument hochmittelalterlicher Politik". In Ranft, Andreas (ed.). Der Hoftag in Quedlinburg 973. Von den historischen Wurzeln zum Neuen Europa (in German). Akademie Verlag. pp. 99–136. ISBN 3-05-004113-7.
- Rosik, Stanisław; Przemysław, Wiszewski (2006). Księga królów i książąt polskich (in Polish). Wydanictwo Dolnośląskie. ISBN 978-83-7384-604-3.
- Schneidmüller, Bernd (2003). Die deutschen Herrscher des Mittelalters. Historische Portraits von Heinrich I. bis Maximilian I. (919–1519) (in German). Beck. ISBN 3-406-50958-4.
- Schwarz, Jörg (2006). Herrschaftsbildungen und Reiche 900–1500. Das europäische Mittelalter (in German). Vol. 2. Kohlhammer. ISBN 3-17-019719-3.
