= Judith of Schweinfurt =

Czech princess

- Duchess of Bohemia
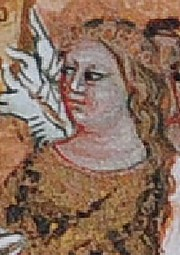
- Depiction in the Chronicle of Dalimil, 14th century
- Born: before 1003
- Died: 2 August 1058
- Noble family: House of Schweinfurt
- Spouses: Bretislav I, Duke of Bohemia
- Issue: Vratislaus II of Bohemia; Spytihněv II, Duke of Bohemia; Conrad I, Duke of Bohemia; Otto I of Olomouc
- Father: Henry of Schweinfurt
- Mother: Gerberga of Henneberg

Judith of Schweinfurt (Czech: Jitka ze Schweinfurtu / in old Czech: Jitka ze Svinibrodu; before 1003 – 2 August 1058) was Duchess consort of Bohemia from 1034 until 1055, by her marriage with the Přemyslid duke Bretislav I.

== Family ==
Her parents were Henry of Schweinfurt (d. 1017), margrave in the Bavarian Nordgau, and his wife Gerberga of Henneberg. Margrave Henry and his father Berthold may have been descendants of Duke Arnulf of Bavaria and related to the Luitpolding dynasty. Berthold's brother (or nephew) Margrave Leopold I of Austria became progenitor of the Younger House of Babenberg. She was raised at the nunnery her family had founded in Schweinfurt.

== Bretislav and Jitka ==
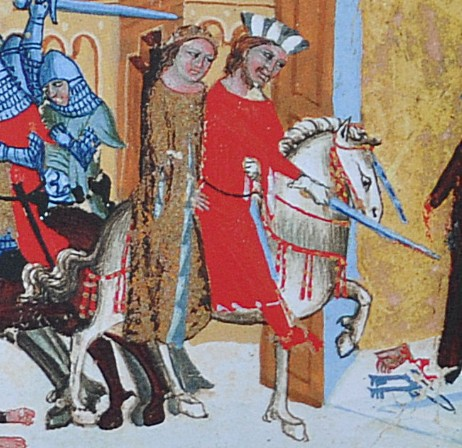
Bretislav abducting Judith, Chronicle of Dalimil

According to František Palacký, the young Bohemian prince Bretislav, son of the Přemyslid duke Oldřich of Bohemia, on his way to the court of Emperor Conrad II in 1029 passed through Schweinfurt, where he met Judith and immediately fell in love with her.

Duke Oldřich had forged an alliance with the German king Henry II to depose his elder brothers Boleslaus III and Jaromír. He also had been able to reconquer large Moravian territories occupied by the Polish duke Bolesław I the Brave by 1019. Therefore, Oldřich was not averse to confirm his good relationship with the German nobility through a marriage to Judith.

Beautiful Judith was a desirable bride, however, Oldřich's only son Bretislav was of illegitimate birth from his misalliance with the farmer's daughter Božena. Judith's relatives were very proud of their noble origins, thus complicating the prospect of Bretislav's marriage with the high-born Judith. The young man solved the problem in his own way by sneaking into the monastery and abducting Judith on a wild ride out of Schweinfurt, shattering locks and chains with his sword. Bretislav was never punished for the crime. He and Judith settled at Olomouc in Moravia.

Bretislav married Judith some time later. Their first son Spytihněv was born after almost ten years (which led to the hypothesis that the kidnapping happened in 1029), although Judith may have given birth to daughters before her first son.

== Exile in Hungary ==
After Bretislav died in 1055, Judith was expelled by her son Spytihněv out of Bohemia, like many other Germans, and moved to the Kingdom of Hungary with her younger son Vratislaus. In Hungary she may have secondly married the former king Peter Orseolo, who had been deposed in 1046. Judith died in 1058 and her mortal remains were transferred to St. Vitus Cathedral in Prague.

== Legacy ==
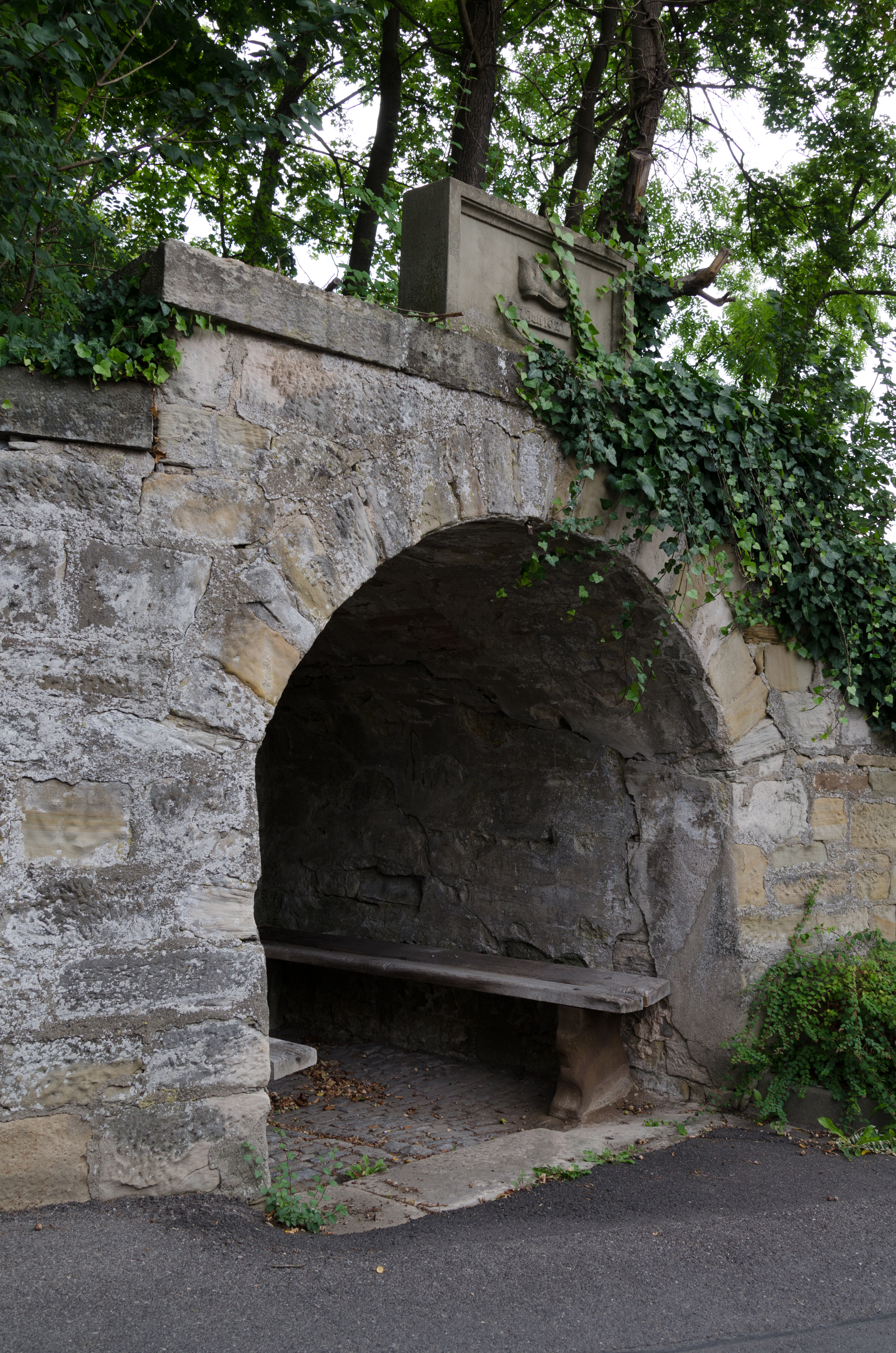
Judith's Shoe, Schweinfurt

The marriage of Bretislav and Judith was perpetuated in the theatre play Bretislaus, also named Bretislav and Jitka, written by the Czech author Jan Campanus Vodňanský (1572–1622) in 1614. The performance was then forbidden, considered detrimental to the reputation of the Bohemian monarchs. According to legend, Judith during her kidnapping lost a shoe when Bretislav's horse galloped downhill from the Schweinfurt monastery; since the 19th century a masonry cave with a stone shoe marks the site.

== Literature ==
- Barbara Krzemienska Břetislav I. - Čechy a střední Evropa v prvé polovině XI. století. Praha : Garamond, 1999.
- Josef Žemlička Čechy v době knížecí 1044–1198. Praha : NLN, 2002. 660 s. ISBN 80-7106-196-4.

Judith of Schweinfurt House of Schweinfurt Born: c. 1003 Died: 2 August 1058
Preceded by Božena (Křesinová)? confirmed: Emma of Mělník	Duchess consort of Bohemia; 1034–1055	Succeeded by Ida of Wettin
