= Wulfhild of Norway =

Duchess consort of Saxony
- Tenure: 29 June 1059 – 24 May 1071
- Born: 1020
- Died: 24 May 1071 (aged 50–51)
- Spouse: Ordulf, Duke of Saxony
- Issue: Magnus, Duke of Saxony
- Dynasty: Fairhair
- Father: Saint Olaf
- Mother: Astrid Olofsdotter of Sweden

Wulfhild of Norway (1020 – 24 May 1071; Old West Norse: Úlfhildr Ólafsdóttir; Swedish: Ulfhild Olofsdotter was a Norwegian princess and Duchess consort of Saxony by marriage to Ordulf, Duke of Saxony. She was a daughter of King Olaf II of Norway and Astrid Olofsdotter of Sweden, and a half-sister of King Magnus the Good of Norway and Denmark.

== Life ==
Wulfhild was born in 1020 as the only legitimate child of King Olaf Haraldsson of Norway and his wife Astrid Olofsdotter of Sweden. Her illegitimate half-brother was Magnus the Good. She was likely born and raised in Sarpsborg.

In 1028, she accompanied her parents to Vestlandet, and in 1029, she left Norway for Sweden with them. It is not determined whether she followed her father and half-brother on their trip to Kievan Rus' or remained in Sweden with her mother, but she did live in Sweden between the death of her father in 1030 until she returned with her half-brother Magnus to Norway in 1035, when he became king. Wulfhild is described as a beauty, and is thought to have been greatly respected as the only legitimate child of her father and daughter of a saint.

On 10 November 1042, she was married to Ordulf, son of Bernard II, Duke of Saxony. This marriage was supposed to strengthen the alliance between Saxony and Denmark; her half-brother expected the support of her consort to strengthen his position in Denmark by fighting the Wends. The marriage ceremony was celebrated in Schleswig during these political negotiations, officiated by the archbishops of Schleswig and Bremen. Her husband did remain loyal to the alliance, but the information about Wulfhild is limited and nothing is known about any of her opinions.

Wulfhild and Ordulf had a son, Magnus, Duke of Saxony.

== Descendants ==
Wulfhild is chiefly significant genealogically. Through her son Magnus, Duke of Saxony, her descendants became connected with both the House of Welf and the House of Ascania. Magnus's daughter Wulfhilde married Henry IX, Duke of Bavaria, and their descendants included later rulers of Brunswick-Lüneburg and Great Britain. His other daughter, Eilika, married into the Ascanian dynasty and was the mother of Albert the Bear.

Through the Ascanian line, Wulfhild was an ancestor of Jutta of Saxony, queen of Denmark as the wife of Eric IV of Denmark. Their daughter Ingeborg married Magnus VI of Norway and was the mother of Kings Eric II of Norway and Haakon V of Norway.

Through these dynastic lines, Wulfhild became an ancestor of many of Europe's later ruling families, including the present Norwegian royal family.

== Sources ==
- Rüdiger, Jan (2020). All the King's Women: Polygyny and Politics in Europe, 900–1250. Translated by Barnwell, Tim. Brill.

Wulfhild of Norway House of Fairhair Cadet branch of the Yngling dynasty Born: 1020 Died: 24 May 1071
German royalty
Vacant Title last held by Eilika of Schweinfurt	Duchess consort of Saxony; 1059–1071	Vacant Title next held by Gertrude of Haldensleben
