= Gerberga of Gleiberg =

Margravine of the Nordgau

Gerberge
- Born: c. 970; Gleiberg, Wetzlar (modern-day Hesse, Germany)
- Died: aft. 1036; Schleswig-Holstein
- Spouse: Henry of Schweinfurt
- Issue: Otto III, Duke of Swabia; Eilika of Schweinfurt; Judith of Schweinfurt; Burchard (possibly) Henry
- Father: Herbert of Wetterau
- Mother: Irmtrud of Avalgau

Gerberga of Gleiberg (German :Gerberga von Gleiberg, c. 970 – aft. 1036) was a noblewoman of the early Holy Roman Empire, known for her dynastic connections to several prominent European houses. She was a daughter of Herbert of Wetterau and Irmtrud of Avalgau (957 – 1020).

Around 1036, Gerberga died in what is now Schleswig-Holstein.

== Marriage ==
She married Henry of Schweinfurt, Margrave of the Nordgau, and had the following children:

- Otto III, Duke of Swabia, married Immilla of Turin and had issue.
- Eilika of Schweinfurt (c. 1005 – 10 Dec c. 1059), married Bernard II, Duke of Saxony
- Judith of Schweinfurt, married Bretislav I, Duke of Bohemia and had issue: Spytihněv II, Duke of Bohemia; Vratislaus II of Bohemia; Conrad I, Duke of Bohemia, Otto I of Olomouc and Jaromír, Bishop of Prague
- Burchard (d. 18 Oct 1059), bishop in 1036 of Halberstadt, chancellor of Conrad II, Holy Roman Emperor
- possibly Heinrich I, Count of Pegnitz, count on the Pegnitz, on the Upper Naab and on the Altmühl. In 1040, he took part in an expedition to Bohemia and had many conflicts with the bishop of Eichstätt. Married a daughter of Kuno of Altdorf (c. 980 – aft. 1020).

== Sources ==
- Dirk Peters: Die Nachkommen Karls des Großen, Brandenburg, Erich, (Verlag Degener und Co, Neustadt an der Aisch, 1995 Bibliothek Klassischer Werke der Genealogie, Herausgegeben von Manfred), VIII.17.
- Leo: Europäische Stammtafeln, Band I, Frank Baron Freytag von Loringhoven, 1975, Isenburg, W. K. Prinz von.
