= Henry II, Holy Roman Emperor =

Holy Roman Emperor from 1014 to 1024

Henry II
- Imperator Romanorum, Saint
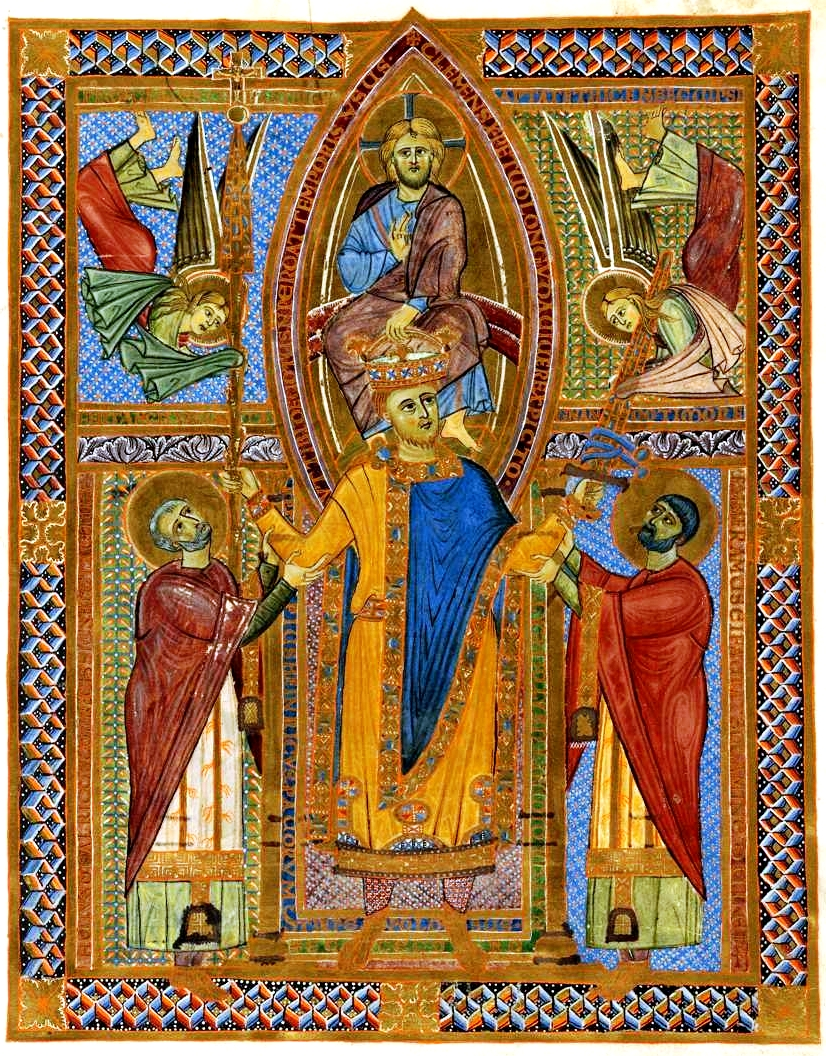
- Henry II as depicted in the Regensburg Sacramentary

Holy Roman Emperor
- Reign: 14 February 1014 – 13 July 1024
- Coronation: 14 February 1014; Old St. Peter's Basilica, Rome
- Predecessor: Otto III
- Successor: Conrad II

King of Italy
- Reign: 15 May 1004 – 13 July 1024
- Coronation: 15 May 1004; Pavia, Kingdom of Italy
- Predecessor: Otto III; Arduin of Ivrea
- Successor: Conrad II

King of Germany
- Reign: 7 June 1002 – 13 July 1024
- Coronation: 7 June 1002; Mainz, Kingdom of Germany
- Predecessor: Otto III
- Successor: Conrad II

Duke of Bavaria
- Reign: 28 August 995 – 21 March 1004; 1009 – December 1017
- Predecessor: Henry II
- Successor: Henry V
- Born: 6 May 973; Abbach, Bavaria, Germany, Holy Roman Empire
- Died: 13 July 1024 (aged 51) near Göttingen, Germany, Holy Roman Empire
- Burial: Bamberg Cathedral
- Spouse: Cunigunde of Luxembourg
- House: Ottonian
- Father: Henry II, Duke of Bavaria
- Mother: Gisela of Burgundy
- Religion: Chalcedonian Christianity

Henry II (German: Heinrich II.; Italian: Enrico II; Latin: Henricus; 6 May 973 – 13 July 1024), also known as Saint Henry, Obl. S. B., (Note: "Oblate of the Order of Saint Benedict") was Holy Roman Emperor (Latin: Romanorum Imperator) from 1014. He died without an heir in 1024 and was the last ruler of the Ottonian line. As Duke of Bavaria, appointed in 995, Henry became King of the Romans (Latin: Rex Romanorum) following the sudden death of his second cousin, Emperor Otto III in 1002, was made King of Italy (Latin: Rex Italiae) in 1004, and crowned emperor by Pope Benedict VIII in 1014.

The son of Henry II, Duke of Bavaria, and Gisela of Burgundy, Henry was a great-grandson of German king Henry the Fowler and a member of the Bavarian branch of the Ottonian dynasty. Since his father had rebelled against two previous emperors, the younger Henry spent long periods of time in exile, where he turned to Christianity at an early age, first finding refuge with Bishop Abraham of Freising and later during his education at the cathedral school in Hildesheim. He succeeded his father as Duke of Bavaria in 995 as Henry IV (Henry III having briefly interrupted his father's rule). As duke, he attempted to join his second cousin, Emperor Otto III, in suppressing a revolt against imperial rule in Italy in 1002. Before Henry could arrive, however, Otto III died of fever, leaving no heir. After defeating several contenders to the throne, he was crowned Henry II, King of Germany, on 9 July 1002 as the first in a line of kings to adopt the title Rex Romanorum as an antedate to his coronation in Rome as Imperator Romanorum. On 15 May 1004, he was anointed King of Italy (Rex Italiae). In that same year, Henry II joined Duke Jaromír of Bohemia in his struggle against the Poles, thus effectively incorporating the Duchy of Bohemia into the Holy Roman Empire.

Unlike his predecessor Otto III, who had imposed plans on sovereign administration and active political involvement in Italy, Henry spent most of his reign concerned with the renovation ("renewal") of the imperial territories north of the Alps, a policy summed up on his seal as Renovatio regni Francorum, which replaced Otto's Renovatio imperii Romanorum. A series of conflicts with the Polish Duke Bolesław I, who had already conquered a number of countries surrounding him, required Henry II's full attention and years of political and military maneuvering. Henry did, however, lead three expeditions into Italy to enforce his feudal claim (Honor Imperii): twice to suppress secessionist revolts and once to address Byzantine attempts to obtain dominance over southern Italy. On 14 February 1014, Pope Benedict VIII crowned Henry Holy Roman Emperor in Rome.

The rule of Henry II has been characterized as a period of centralized authority throughout the Holy Roman Empire. He consolidated his power by cultivating personal and political ties with the Catholic Church. He greatly expanded the Ottonian dynasty's custom of employing clerics as counterweights against secular nobles. Through donations to the Church and the establishment of new dioceses, Henry strengthened imperial rule across the Empire and increased control over ecclesiastical affairs. He stressed service to the Church and promoted monastic reform. For his remarkable personal piety and enthusiastic promotion of the Church, he was canonized by Pope Eugene III in 1146. He is the only medieval German monarch ever to have been honoured as a saint. Henry II's wife was the equally pious Empress Cunigunde, who was canonized in 1200 by Pope Innocent III. As the union produced no children, the German nobles elected Conrad II, a great-great-grandson of Emperor Otto I, to succeed him after he died in 1024. Conrad was the first of the Salian dynasty of emperors.

== Early life and marriage ==
Henry was born in May 973, the son of Duke Henry II of Bavaria, and Gisela of Burgundy. Through his father, he was the grandson of Duke Henry I of Bavaria, and the great-grandson of King Henry I of Germany. By his mother, he was the grandson of King Conrad I of Burgundy, and the great-grandson of King Rudolf II of Burgundy.

The elder Henry came into conflict with his cousin Otto II, Holy Roman Emperor, in 974. The elder Henry and Otto II disputed each other's claims to authority over the Duchy of Swabia: Henry claimed the duchy as his birthright. At the same time, Otto II maintained his right to name a duke of his choosing. After an initial failed revolt, Otto II imprisoned the elder Henry in Ingelheim. After escaping, Henry again revolted against Otto II. When this second revolt failed, Otto II deposed Henry as Duke of Bavaria. He sent him into exile under the custody of the Bishop of Utrecht in April 978. As a consequence of his revolt, the Emperor stripped the Duchy of Bavaria of its southeastern territories bordering Italy and formed the Duchy of Carinthia.

During his father's exile, the younger Henry lived in Hildesheim. As a child, he was educated in the Christian faith by Bishop Wolfgang of Regensburg, and then studied at the Hildesheim Cathedral. The Emperor himself ensured that the younger Henry received an ecclesiastical education so that, by becoming a religious official, he would be prevented from participating in the Imperial government.

The death of Otto II in 983 allowed the elder Henry to be released from custody and to return from exile. The elder Henry claimed regency over Otto III, the three-year-old child of Otto II. After a failed attempt to claim the German throne for himself in 985, the elder Henry relinquished the regency to the child's mother Theophanu. In return for his submission to the child king, Henry was restored as Duke of Bavaria. The younger Henry, now thirteen years old, was appointed regent of Bavaria. When the elder Henry died in 995, the younger Henry was elected by the Bavarian nobles as the new duke to succeed his father.

In 999, Henry married Cunigunde of Luxembourg, a daughter of Count Siegfried of Luxembourg. This marriage granted him an extensive network of contacts in Germany's western territories.

== Reign as king ==
=== Disputed succession ===
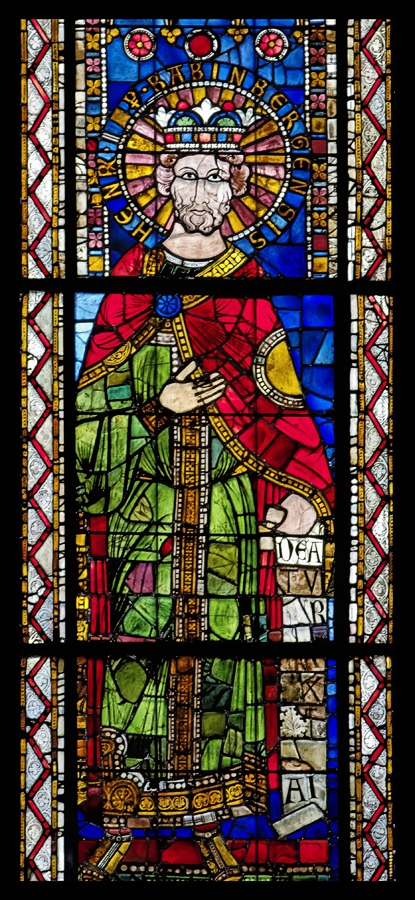
12th-century stained glass depiction of Henry II, Strasbourg Cathedral

In 1001, Emperor Otto III experienced a revolt against his reign in Italy. The Emperor sent word for Henry II to join him with reinforcements from Germany, but then died unexpectedly in January 1002. Otto was only 21 at the time of his death and had left no children and no instructions for the Imperial succession. In the Ottonian dynasty, succession to the throne had belonged to the Saxon branch, not the Bavarian line of which Henry was a member. Rival candidates for the throne, including Count Ezzo of Lotharingia, Margrave Eckard I of Meissen, and Duke Herman II of Swabia, strongly contested Henry's right to succeed Otto III.

As the funeral procession moved through the Duchy of Bavaria in February 1002, Henry met the procession in Polling, just north of the Alps. To legitimise his claims, Henry demanded that Archbishop Heribert of Cologne give him the Imperial Regalia, chief among them being the Holy Lance. Heribert, however, had sent these ahead of the procession, possibly out of distrust of Henry and possibly because he favoured the succession of his relative, Duke Herman II of Swabia, as the next king. To force Herman II to relinquish the Holy Lance to him, Henry imprisoned the Archbishop and his brother, the Bishop of Würzburg. With neither the symbols of imperial authority, the crown jewels, nor the cooperation of Heribert, Henry was unable to convince the nobles attending Otto III's funeral procession to elect him as king. A few weeks later, at Otto III's funeral in Aachen Cathedral, Henry again attempted to gain the support of the kingdom's nobles and was again rejected.

So it was without the support of the kingdom's nobility that Henry took the radical action of having himself anointed and crowned King of Germany ("Rex Romanorum") by Willigis, Archbishop of Mainz on 9 July 1002 at Mainz, in present-day Germany. Henry's action marked the first time a German king was not crowned in Aachen Cathedral since Emperor Otto I began the tradition in 936, and the first time a German king assumed the throne without being elected by the German nobility. Under the regal name of "King Henry II", he appeared before the Saxons in mid-July in full regal apparel. There, Henry convinced Bernard I, Duke of Saxony, to support his claims to the throne. In return for his support, Henry guaranteed Bernard's right to rule the Saxons and to represent their interests before him.

Shortly after gaining the support of the Saxons, Henry arranged for Archbishop Willigis to crown his wife, Cunigunde of Luxembourg, as Queen of Germany on 10 August 1002 in Paderborn, in present-day Germany.

=== Consolidation of power ===
Henry II spent the next several years consolidating his political power within his borders. Herman II, Duke of Swabia, in particular, fiercely contested Henry II's right to the throne. The Swabian Duke believed he was Otto III's true successor, as he had married a daughter of Liudolf, Duke of Swabia, the eldest son of Emperor Otto I. Armed conflicts between Henry II and Herman II broke out but proved to be inconclusive. This forced the two men to compete politically for the support of the Swabian nobles.

Unable to decisively defeat Herman in Swabia, Henry II attempted to legitimize his seizure of the throne by traveling throughout the various duchies of his kingdom – Saxony, Bavaria, Swabia, Upper Lorraine, Lower Lorraine, Franconia. This was done to obtain the general consent of his subjects, rather than through a traditional election. Henry II's familial ties to the Ottonian dynasty eventually caused the kingdom's nobles to accept him as king. After being defeated at a battle near Strasburg, Herman II submitted to Henry II's authority on 1 October 1002. In exchange for this surrender, Henry II allowed Herman II to remain Duke of Swabia until his death the following year, after which, although recognizing the minor Hermann III as his father's titular successor, Henry II effectively assumed all power over the Duchy himself.

In 1003, Henry of Schweinfurt, Margrave of Nordgau in Bavaria, revolted against Henry II's rule. Henry II had promised to install the Margrave as his successor to the Duchy of Bavaria in exchange for supporting his claim to the German crown. Upon assuming the throne, however, Henry II refused to honour his promise and instead supported the Bavarians' right to elect their own duke. With Henry II's support, Count Henry I of Luxembourg became the Duke of Bavaria as Henry V. Betrayed by the King, Margrave Henry allied with Bolesław I of Poland against him. However, his rebellion was soon quashed, and the Nordgauian Margrave was deposed in 1004. Henry II then abolished the March of Nordgau, established the Diocese of Bamberg in 1007, and transferred secular authority over the March's former territory to the Diocese to prevent further uprisings.

=== First Italian expedition ===
The death of Otto III in 1002 and the resulting political turmoil over his successor allowed Italy to fall from German control. Margrave Arduin of Ivrea proclaimed himself King of Italy at Pavia soon after the Emperor's death. Accompanied by Archbishop Arnulf II of Milan, Arduin won the support of the Italian territorial magnates. Arduin, however, had been excommunicated in 997 for the murder of the Bishop of Vercelli. This allowed Arduin's enemies in the Church, led by Archbishop Frederick of Ravenna, to side with the German King Henry II as the rightful ruler of Italy. Henry II sent Duke Otto I of Carinthia, over the March of Verona, to face Arduin, but Arduin successfully defeated Otto's troops at the Battle of Fabrica in 1003.

In 1004, Henry II responded to calls for aid from Italian bishops and led an invasion into Italy against Arduin. Henry II gathered his troops at Augsburg and marched through the Brenner Pass to Trento, Italy. After initial military successes, much of the Italian clergy and some noble families swore allegiance to Henry II, including Archbishop Arnulf II. Joining Henry II in Bergamo, Arnulf II crowned him as King of Italy ("Rex Italiae") on 14 May 1004 in Pavia, in the Basilica of San Michele Maggiore. Unlike his predecessors, after gaining the Kingdom of Italy Henry II wore two crowns, one for Germany and one for Italy, instead of a common crown representing both realms.

After the coronation, a dispute arose between some of the residents and Henry's people. It escalated to the point where the residents attacked the palace where the king was dining. The army encamped outside the city swiftly moved to protect the king, and in the onslaught, the city caught fire, and many residents were killed.

After receiving the homage of the remaining Italian nobles, Henry returned to Germany in the early summer of 1004 without first traveling to Rome to claim the Imperial crown. This is most likely due to opposition from Pope John XVIII. Henry would not return to Italy for a decade, leaving the Kingdom to govern itself. Henry returned to Germany to take military action against the rebellious Bolesław I of Poland.

== Conflict with Poland ==
=== Polish relations ===
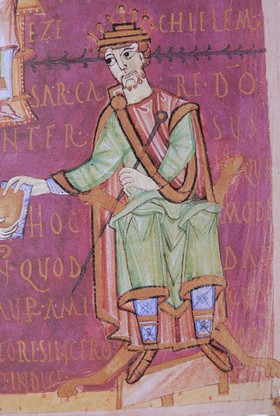
Emperor Henry II, from the Manuscript of St. Gregory's Moralia in Job, Bamberg State Library

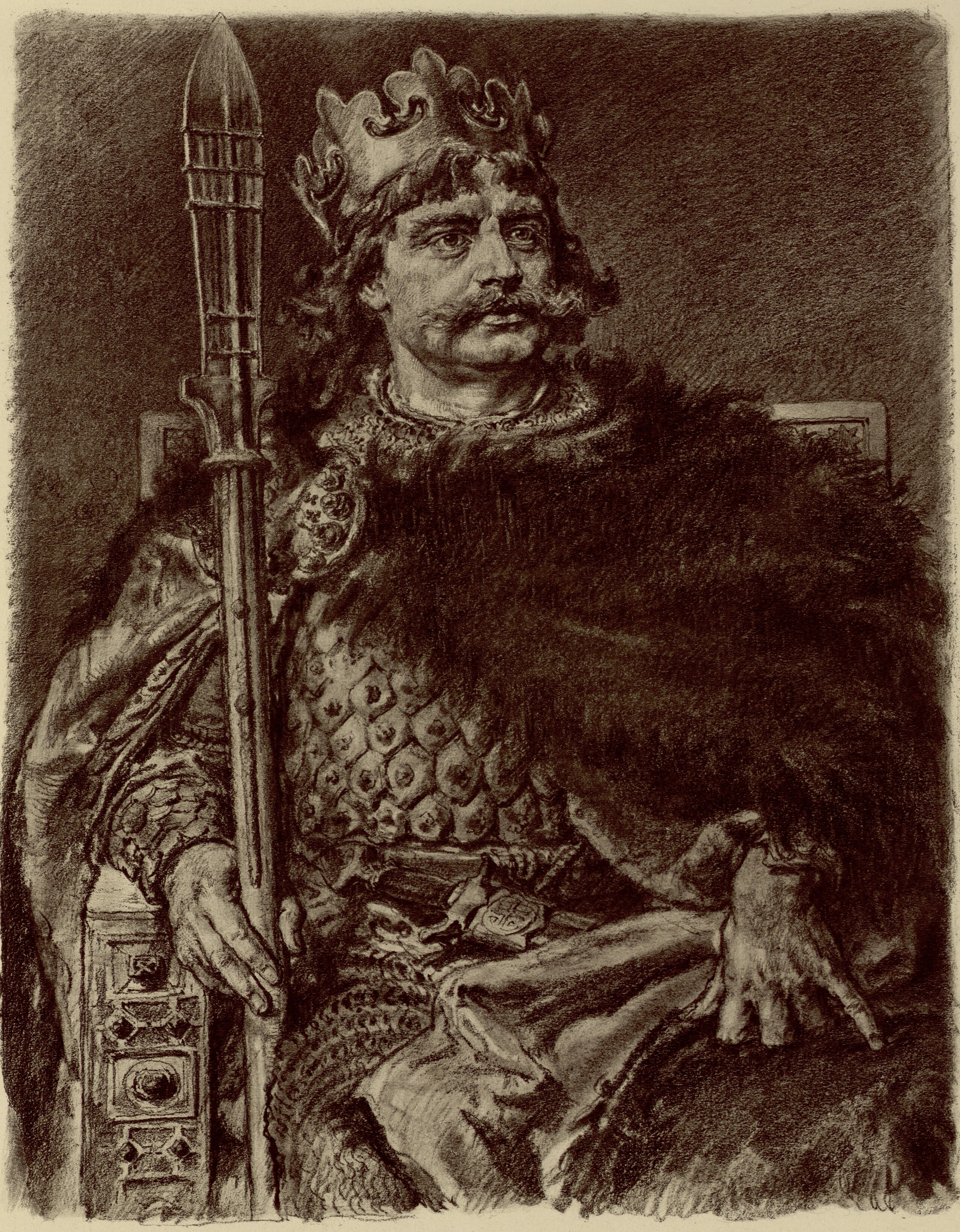
Bolesław I of Poland in a drawing by Jan Matejko

The untimely death of Emperor Otto III at age 21 in 1002 upset the young Emperor's ambitious renovatio plans, which were never fully implemented. Henry II reversed Otto III's eastern policies, damaging the excellent relationship Germany and Bolesław I of Poland had enjoyed during Otto III's reign. Bolesław I had been a loyal supporter of Otto III, but Henry II's actions caused Bolesław I to seek new German allies. Of the major candidates seeking to succeed to the German throne, Bolesław I supported Margrave Eckard I of Meissen over Henry. Only after Saxon nobles assassinated Eckard in April 1002 did Bolesław I lend his support to Henry II.

Bolesław I traveled to Merseburg on 25 July 1002 and paid homage to the new German king. Bolesław I had taken advantage of Germany's internal strife following Otto III's death, occupying important German territories west of the Oder River: the March of Meissen and the March of Lusatia. Bolesław I took control of these territories following the assassination of Margrave Eckard I. Henry II accepted Bolesław I's gains, allowing the Polish Duke to keep Lusatia as a fief, with Bolesław I recognizing Henry II as his overlord. However, Henry II refused to allow Bolesław I to retain possession of Meissen. Shortly after Bolesław I's departure from Merseburg, an assassination attempt was made against him. Though the attempt failed, Bolesław I was seriously injured. The Polish Duke accused Henry II of instituting the attack, and relations between the two countries were severed. Bolesław I also refused to pay tribute to Germany.

Before the open rebellion in 1004, Boleslaus III, Duke of Bohemia, was ousted in a revolt in 1002. Bolesław I intervened in the Bohemian affair and reinstalled Boleslaus III upon the Bohemian throne in 1003. Boleslaus III soon undermined his own position, however, by ordering a massacre of his leading nobles. Bohemian nobles secretly sent a messenger to Bolesław I, requesting his direct intervention in the crisis. The Polish duke willingly agreed and invited the Bohemian duke to Poland. There, Boleslaus III was captured, blinded, and imprisoned, where he would remain until his death some thirty years later. Claiming dominion over Bohemia for himself, Bolesław I invaded Bohemia in 1003 and conquered the duchy without any serious opposition. Bohemia had previously been under German influence and protection, and the Polish invasion further heightened tensions between Germany and Poland.

Bolesław I openly rebelled against Henry II's rule in 1004, burning down the castle in Meissen in an act of war. Returning from Italy after reclaiming the Italian throne, Henry II launched a military campaign against Poland in 1004 that lasted until 1018, encompassing three wars and several smaller campaigns.

=== First Polish War ===
Returning from his first expedition to Italy, Henry II gathered an army in 1004 to march against Poland. The previous year in 1003, Henry II had formed an alliance with the pagan Slavic Lutici tribe. As a consequence of their military alliance, Henry II halted Christianization efforts among the Slavic peoples. The new alliance with the Western Slavs against Poland was, however, controversial. Many German nobles had hoped for continued missionary work and the direct submission of the Elbe Slavs. In addition, many German nobles opposed the war because they had developed family ties with Poland during Otto III's reign. It interfered with Bishop Bruno of Querfurt's mission to Poland, so he set out for Hungary.

In preparation for Henry II's coming military invasion, Bolesław I developed a similar alliance with other Slavic peoples. With his conquest west of the Oder River in 1002, his domain stretched from the Baltic Sea to the Carpathian Mountains. Furthermore, the Polish Duke was kin to numerous princes of Scandinavia.

Henry II answered Bolesław I's rebellion by invading in the summer of 1004, reaching the Ore Mountains in northern Bohemia. He then conquered the castle at Žatec and wiped out the Polish army left there. At the same time, Jaromir (the younger brother of the deposed Bohemian Duke Boleslaus III) invaded Bohemia with German military support. At Merseburg, Jaromír promised to hold Bohemia as a vassal of Henry II, thereby definitively incorporating it into the Holy Roman Empire. Forcing Bolesław I to flee, Jaromír occupied Prague with a German army and proclaimed himself Duke. The state he regained was a small one, however, as Polish forces would hold Moravia, Silesia, and Lusatia until 1018.

During the next part of the offensive, Henry II retook Meissen and, in summer 1005, his army advanced deep into Poland, suffering significant losses along the way. At the Polish city of Poznań, the German forces were ambushed by the Polish army and suffered significant losses. Meeting in Poznań, Henry II and Bolesław I signed a peace treaty. According to its terms, Bolesław I lost Lusatia and Meissen and was forced to give up his claim to the Bohemian throne. The peace lasted only two years because neither party recognized the other's claims.

=== Second Polish War ===
In 1007, Henry II denounced the Peace of Poznań, resulting in Bolesław I's attack on the Archbishopric of Magdeburg as well as his re-occupation of the marches of Lusatia and Meissen, including the city of Bautzen. The German counteroffensive began three years later in 1010. It was of no significant consequence, beyond some pillaging in Silesia. In 1012, a second peace treaty between Germany and Poland was signed. Bolesław I quickly broke the peace, however, and once again invaded Lusatia. Bolesław I's forces pillaged and burned the city of Lubusz. In 1013, a third peace treaty was signed at Merseburg, requiring in part that Bolesław I recognize Henry II as his overlord in exchange for receiving the March of Lusatia and the March of Meissen as fiefs. To seal their peace, Bolesław I's son Mieszko II married Richeza of Lotharingia, daughter of the Count Palatine Ezzo of Lotharingia, granddaughter of Emperor Otto II.

== Reign as emperor ==
=== Imperial coronation ===
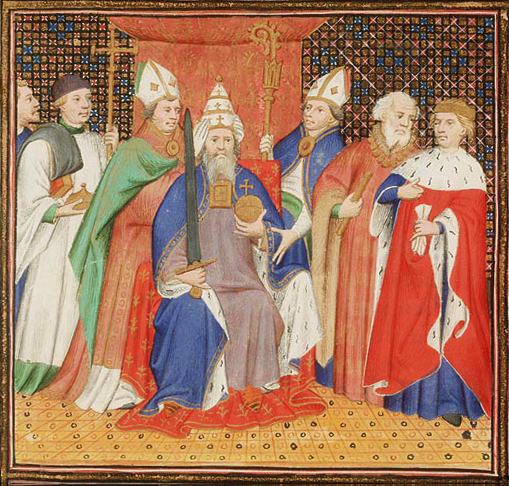
Henry II crowned as Emperor by Pope Benedict VIII in 1014.

John XVIII reigned as pope from 1003 until 1009. He was succeeded by Sergius IV from 1009 to 1012. Both John and Sergius, though the nominal popes, were subservient to the power of John II Crescentius. As leader of the Crescentii clan and Patrician of Rome, John was the effective ruler of the city. John's influence prevented Henry II from meeting the Pope on numerous occasions, preventing him from claiming the imperial title. Following Sergius's death in 1012, Benedict VIII was elected to succeed him. Upon assuming the chair of St. Peter, however, Benedict was forced to flee Rome by Gregory VI, an antipope whom the Crescentii installed as the new head of the Catholic Church. Fleeing across the Alps to Germany, Benedict appealed to Henry for protection. Henry agreed to restore Benedict to the papal throne in exchange for Benedict's coronation of Henry as emperor.

Near the end of 1013, Henry II gathered his army at Augsburg to march into Italy. Earlier in 1013, Henry signed a peace treaty with Duke Bolesław of Poland at Merseburg. The peace with Poland allowed Henry to address affairs in Italy. On the march across the Alps, Henry was accompanied by his wife, Cunigunde of Luxembourg, and several clerics. Upon reaching Pavia, other bishops and abbots joined him. Henry's forces trapped the King of Italy Arduin in his capital of Ivrea, where he remained until 1015.

Henry II arrived in Rome in early 1014 and restored Benedict VIII as pope. On 14 February 1014, the Pope crowned Henry as Holy Roman Emperor ("Romanorum Imperator") in St. Peter's Basilica. Then, under the presidency of the Emperor and Pope, a synod was held in Rome, appointing five bishops, issuing decrees against simony and promoting chastity within the clergy, and ordering the restitution of Church property. Shortly afterwards, the Emperor moved north again, where he established the Diocese of Bobbio. Celebrating Easter in Pavia and Italy, Henry then returned to Germany in mid-May 1014. He left the rule of Rome to the Pope and thereafter rarely intervened in the politics of Italy or the Papal States.

In 1015, the conflict with Arduin ended when Arduin fell ill and sought peace with Henry II. He resigned the office of Margrave of Ivrea to become a monk in a monastery at Fruttuaria. He died on 14 December 1015. His brief "reign" as King of Italy would be the last time a native Italian would reign over Italy until its unification under Victor Emmanuel II in 1861. After Arduin's death, Henry ordered the Margravate of Ivrea, which had caused the Ottonian emperors so much trouble, to be dissolved.

=== Third Polish War ===
The peace agreement of 1013 between Henry II and Bolesław I of Poland quickly deteriorated. In 1014, with Henry II absent from Germany, Bolesław I sent his son Mieszko II Lambert to the Duchy of Bohemia to persuade the new Bohemian Duke Oldřich into an alliance against Henry II. The mission failed, and Oldřich imprisoned Mieszko II. He was released only after the intervention of the Emperor, who, despite the planned invasion of Poland, loyally acted on behalf of his nominal vassal Bolesław I. As a result, Mieszko II was sent to Henry II's imperial court in Merseburg as a hostage. Henry II probably wanted to compel Bolesław I to appear in Merseburg and explain his actions. The plan failed, however, because, under pressure from his relatives, the Emperor soon agreed to release Mieszko II.

At the same time, Henry II entertained Yaroslav, the pretender to the throne of the Kyivan Rus'. A son of Kyivan Grand Duke Vladimir the Great, he was vice-regent of the Principality of Novgorod at the time of his father's death in 1015. Yaroslav's eldest surviving brother, Sviatopolk I of Kyiv, killed three of his other brothers and seized power in Kyiv. Henry II's support for Yaroslav was in direct opposition not only to Sviatopolk but also to Bolesław I. Years earlier, Bolesław I had married one of his daughters to Sviatopolk, making the new Kyivan Grand Duke a son-in-law of the Polish Duke.

Henry II returned to Germany in 1015 after being crowned Emperor by Pope Benedict VIII and prepared for a third invasion of Poland. With three armies at his command, the largest contingent since the beginning of the conflict in 1004, the Imperial army simultaneously marched in a pincer movement from the German north, south, and center. Henry II himself commanded the center army, supported by allied Slavic tribes, and moved from Magdeburg to cross the Oder river into Poland. Henry II was soon joined from the south by Bohemian Duke Oldřich and from the north by Duke Bernard II of Saxony.

As the Imperial army crossed the Oder River and marched across Poland, Henry II's forces killed or captured several thousand Poles, including women and children. But the Imperial army suffered heavy losses throughout the campaign. Bolesław I sent a detachment of Moravian knights under the command of Mieszko II in a diversionary attack against the Empire's Eastern March. The Imperial army retreated from Poland to Merseburg to address the assault without making any permanent territorial gains east of the Oder River. During the retreat to Germany, Gero II, margrave of the Eastern March, was ambushed by Polish forces and killed late in 1015. Following the attack on the Eastern March, Bolesław I's forces took the offensive. Bolesław I sent Mieszko II to besiege Meissen in 1017, then under the command of Mieszko II's brother-in-law Margrave Herman I. His attempt to conquer the city failed, however, and he was forced to retreat to Poland.

Henry II and Bolesław I then opened peace negotiations, and a ceasefire was declared in summer 1017. As negotiations failed by autumn 1017, Henry II again marched his army into Poland. His army reached Głogów, where Bolesław I was entrenched, but it was unable to take the city. Henry II then besieged Niemcza, but was likewise unable to capture the city. As his army besieged Niemcza, disease caused by the winter cold devastated the Imperial forces. His attacks unsuccessful, Henry II was forced to retreat to Merseburg in Germany. With this defeat, Henry II was ready to end the war and begin serious peace negotiations with Bolesław I.

On 30 January 1018, Henry II and Bolesław I signed a fourth peace treaty, known as the Peace of Bautzen. The Polish duke was able to keep the contested marches of Lusatia and Meissen on purely nominal terms of vassalage, with Bolesław I recognizing Henry II as his feudal lord. Henry II also promised to support Bolesław I in the Polish ruler's expedition to Kiev to ensure his son-in-law, Sviatopolk, claimed the Kievan throne. To seal the peace, Bolesław I, then a widower, reinforced his dynastic bonds with the German nobility by marrying Oda of Meissen, daughter of the Saxon Margrave Eckard I of Meissen.

=== Conflict with Byzantium ===
Henry II's involvement in Italian politics and his coronation as emperor inevitably brought him into conflict with the Byzantine Empire. In 969, Emperor Otto I allied with Byzantine Emperor John I Tzimiskes, under which both Eastern and Western Empires would jointly govern southern Italy. Otto I's death in 973, and John I's in 976, caused this alliance to deteriorate. Otto I's successor in the West, his son Emperor Otto II, and John I's successor in the East, his nephew Basil II, once again brought the two empires into conflict over control of southern Italy.

Under Otto I and Otto II, the Lombard leader Pandulf Ironhead expanded Western imperial control over central and southern Italy. Originally appointed by Otto I as Prince of Benevento and Capua in 961, Pandulf waged war against the Byzantines as a loyal lieutenant of Otto II. By 978, Pandulf had incorporated all three of the southern Lombard principalities – Benevento, Capua, and Salerno – into the Holy Roman Empire. Pandulf's death in 981, however, weakened Western dominance over the Byzantine Empire in southern Italy. By 982, the entire area once ruled by Pandulf had collapsed. The Byzantines still claimed sovereignty over the Lombard principalities, and the lack of a single leader to stop their advances into Lombard territory allowed them to make inroads farther north. While in Byzantine territory, Otto II encountered a large Muslim army brought into the region by Abu al-Qasim, Emir of Sicily, and was soundly defeated in the ensuing battle of Stilo on 14 July 982. The defeat shifted the balance of power in southern Italy into Byzantine favor. While preparing to counterattack the Byzantine advance, Otto II suddenly died in Rome, and his infant son, Otto III, succeeded him. With an infant as ruler and a political crisis to address, the Western Empire was unable to challenge Byzantine dominance. This allowed Basil II to build up his defense forces in preparation for a future Western counterattack.

In 1017, aided by Norman mercenaries, the Lombard noble Melus of Bari led a successful rebellion against Byzantine control of Apulia. The Byzantine Empire struck back in 1018 under Catepan of Italy Basil Boioannes, delivering a devastating defeat to the joint Lombard-Norman force at the Battle of Cannae. Melus fled to the Papal States following the defeat. With the Byzantine successes in southern Italy, Pope Benedict VIII took an unusual step in 1020, traveling north across the Alps into Germany to discuss the situation there with the Emperor. Meeting Henry II in Bamberg, the Pope was accompanied by a large number of Italian secular and ecclesiastical leaders, including Melus. Henry II granted Melus the empty title Duke of Apulia for his actions against the Byzantines. But Melus died just a few days later, on 23 April 1020. After settling some controversies with the bishops of Mainz and Würzburg, the Pope convinced Henry II to return to Italy for a third campaign to counter the growing power of the Byzantine Empire.

In 1022, Henry II set out down the Adriatic coast for southern Italy, commanding a large force. He sent Archbishop Pilgrim of Cologne ahead with a slightly smaller army along the Tyrrhenian littoral with the objective of subjugating the Principality of Capua. A third army, smaller still, under the command of Patriarch Poppo of Aquileia went through the Apennines to join Henry II in besieging the Byzantine fortress of Troia. Though Pilgrim captured Pandulf IV of Capua and extracted oaths of allegiance from both Capua and the Principality of Salerno, all three of Henry II's armies failed to take Troia. The Byzantine troops could not be forced into a pitched battle, and Henry II was forced to turn back, his army weakened by diseases and suffering heavy losses. Henry II almost executed the treacherous prince of Capua, but he relented at the last moment at Pilgrim's pleading. Instead, Henry II sent him off to Germany in chains and appointed Pandulf V to replace him as prince of Capua. The expedition ultimately achieved little, and Pandulf IV would be reinstated as Prince of Capua as a Byzantine ally in 1026.

== Imperial Policies ==
Upon assuming the German throne, Henry II revised many of his predecessor's policies, including those of Otto III, Holy Roman Emperor. Whereas Otto III had promoted a policy of "Restoration of the Roman Empire" (Renovatio imperii Romanorum), Henry II sought a policy of "Restoration of the Frankish Kingdom" (Renovatio regni Francorum). Compared to the other members of the Ottonian dynasty, Henry II spent relatively little time in Italy, traveling south of the Alps only three times during his twenty-two-year reign. He was absent from the Italian peninsula for over a decade, from his expulsion of Margrave Arduin of Ivrea in 1004 to his return in 1014 to claim the imperial title, allowing the kingdom to govern itself for the most part.

Henry II's absence from Italy was primarily due to his continued conflict with Bolesław I Chrobry of Poland. During the reign of Otto III, Bolesław I had been a loyal ally of the Empire. However, the protracted German-Polish wars brought the two nations into open warfare for over sixteen years.

=== Ecclesiastical affairs ===
Henry II inherited several unresolved ecclesiastical disputes from his predecessor Otto III. Issues of particular importance were the reestablishment of the Diocese of Merseburg and the settlement of the Gandersheim Conflict.

- The Diocese of Merseburg had been established by Emperor Otto I in 968 to commemorate his victory against the pagan Hungarians at the Battle of Lechfeld in 955. Established to conduct missionary work among the pagan Slavs, the Diocese was all but abandoned in 983 following a major Slavic revolt against Imperial rule. In 1004, Henry II ordered the reestablishment of the Diocese to resume missionary work among the Slavs and appointed the German chronicler Thietmar of Merseburg to serve as its bishop.
- In 987, during the regency of Otto III's mother Theophanu, the Gandersheim Conflict, centering around the jurisdiction of Gandersheim Abbey, first flared up. Both the Archbishop of Mainz and the Bishop of Hildesheim claimed authority over the Abbey, including the authority to invest the Abbey's nuns. Otto III and Theophanu's intervention eased tensions between the parties but did not permanently resolve the issue. Henry II only succeeded in suppressing the argument in 1007 and again in 1021. Still unsolved after he died in 1024, a compromise was pushed at an Imperial synod in 1030 in the presence of his successor, Emperor Conrad II. Hildesheim was eventually given jurisdiction.

In May 1017, Empress Cunigunde became seriously ill while staying at the imperial estates in Kaufungen. Henry II vowed to found a monastery on the site if she recovered. Upon her recovery in 1018, Henry ordered the construction of the Kaufungen Abbey. After Henry II died in 1024, Cunigunde retreated to the Abbey, where she remained until her own death in 1040.

Sincerely religious, Henry II supported the Church and promoted various monastic reforms (he was celibate). He also strongly enforced clerical celibacy, perhaps partly so that the public land and offices he granted to clerics would not be devised to heirs. He encouraged Church reform, fostered missionary activity, and established several charitable foundations for the poor.

Henry II wished to become a monk, and in virtue of his imperial power, he ordered the Abbot of Verdun to accept him in his monastery. Thereupon, the Abbot ordered him, in virtue of the vows he had professed, to continue the administration of the empire. Henry II fulfilled his duties with humility and service, believing that God had given him temporal power for the good of the people.

Henry II persuaded Pope Benedict VIII to include the word "Filioque" in the Nicene Creed. The addition of the term provided that the Holy Spirit emanated from both God the Father and God the Son. Together with the concept of Papal primacy, dispute over this doctrine was one of the primary causes of the Great Schism of the Church in 1054.

=== Empire–Church relations ===
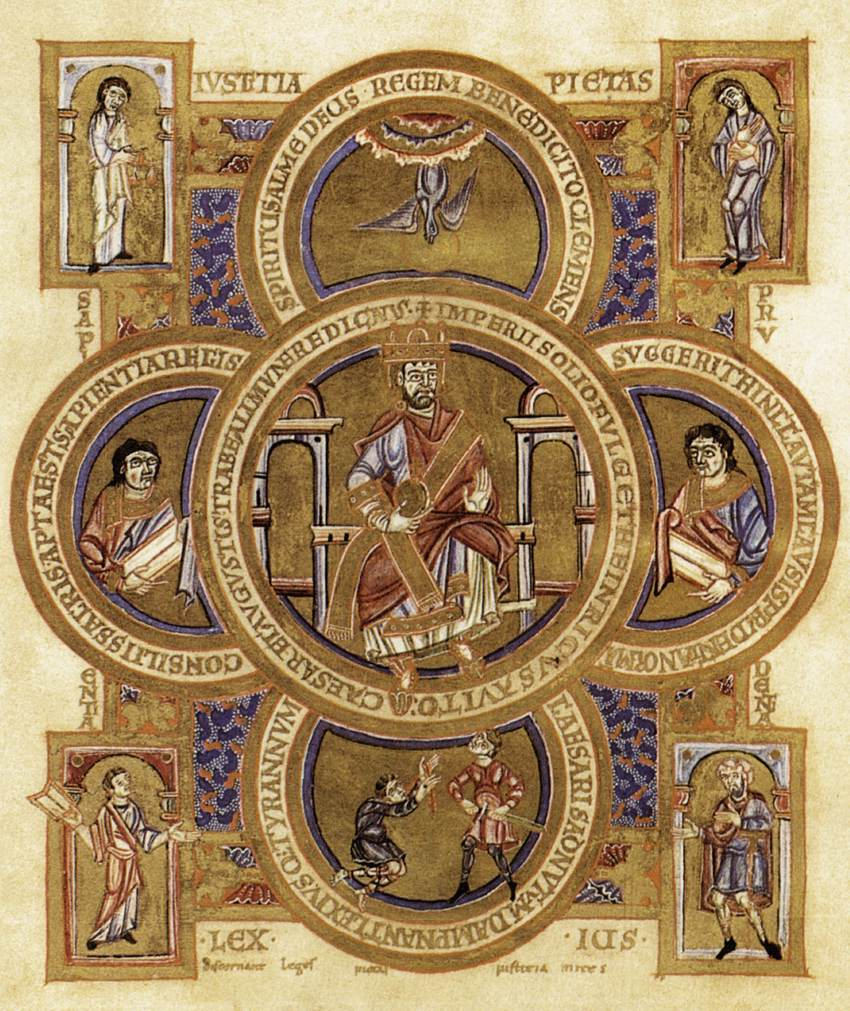
Gospel Book of Henry II

The Ottonian dynasty's traditional policy of investing celibate clerics in the secular governance of the empire – the Imperial Church System – reached its climax under Henry II. Introduced by Emperor Otto I, the Ottonians appointed and integrated the higher clergy into the imperial administration, seeking to establish a non-hereditary counter-balance to the fiercely independent and powerful German Stem duchies. The dukes have always preferred political particularism, looking to the interests of their respective duchies above the interests of the Empire as a whole. In an effort to unify the Empire under their leadership, the Ottonians increasingly associated themselves with the Church, claiming "divine right" to rule the Empire and presenting themselves as the protectors of Christendom. A key element of this policy was to grant land and bestow the title of Prince of the Empire (Reichsfürst) to appointed bishops and abbots at the expense of the secular nobility. Unlike the dukes, these ecclesiastic figureheads would not be able to pass titles and privileges down a dynastic line. The Ottonian monarchs reserved the right to appointment and investiture of bishops of the empire's proprietary churches for themselves. They commanded loyalty, but this contradicted canon law, which demanded absolute dedication to the universal Church.

Under Henry II, an increasing number of counties were assigned to secular rulership by bishops. He granted numerous and lavish donations of imperial regalia and land to the monasteries and dioceses of the Empire; in fact, no other Holy Roman sovereign was named as often in the memorial records. With these extensive donations and the expanded powers of the emperor, the Catholic church gradually lost its autonomy. The imperial monasteries and other clerical institutions became so numerous, and donations and secular privileges were granted to them so regularly, that they eventually developed into an imperial bureaucracy. The chronicler Thietmar of Merseburg states that the cooperation between Henry II and the bishops of the empire was more intense than that of any other ruler of the Middle Ages, as the dividing lines between secular and ecclesiastical affairs were blurred beyond recognition. The clergy increasingly viewed Henry II as their feudal lord, particularly in military matters. The cleric princes came to make up a large part of Henry II's imperial army. For most of Henry II's campaigns against Poland and the Byzantine Empire, the cleric princes constituted the largest contingent. Henry II thus strengthened his control over the empire through the clergy, while gaining greater control over the Church's spiritual policies.

=== Diocese of Bamberg ===
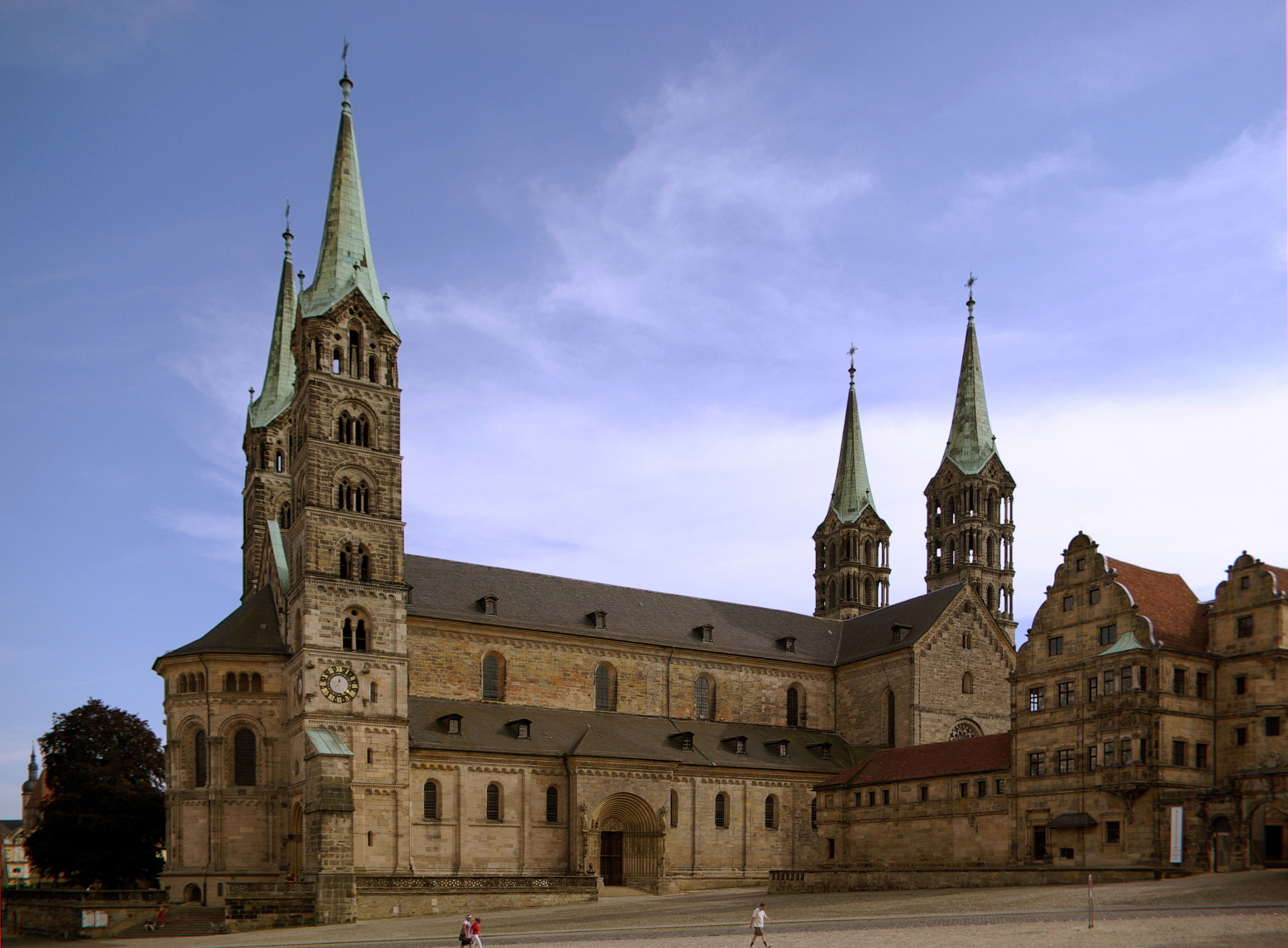
Bamberg Cathedral

In 1003, Henry of Schweinfurt, Margrave of the Nordgau in Bavaria, revolted against Henry II's rule. Henry II had promised to install the margrave as his successor to the Duchy of Bavaria in exchange for supporting his claim to the German crown. Upon assuming the throne, however, Henry II refused to honour his promise. Instead, Henry II deposed Margrave Henry in 1004 and abolished the March outright. In 1007, to assume secular authority over the March's former territory, Henry II announced his desire to establish a new diocese in Germany: the Diocese of Bamberg. Growing up in the Duchy of Bavaria, Henry II was fond of Bamberg, even giving his estates there to his wife Cunigunde of Luxembourg as her dower upon their marriage. Mission work among the Slavs of the region had previously been conducted by the Imperial Abbey at Fulda as part of the Diocese of Würzburg. To establish his diocese, Henry II needed to overcome the considerable resistance of the Bishop of Würzburg, as the new diocese would comprise about one-fourth of the former's territory. Henry II desired the new Diocese to aid in the final conquest of the pagan Slavs in the area around Bamberg.

Henry II held a synod in Frankfurt on 1 November 1007 to build consensus among the bishops of the Empire on establishing the Diocese of Bamberg. The Bishop of Würzburg, who hoped that the loss of territory from the formation of the new Diocese would result in his elevation to the rank of Archbishop, was not in attendance. Henry II also assigned a portion of the territory from the Diocese of Eichstätt to his planned Diocese. At the synod, Henry II obtained permission to found the Diocese. It was also decided that Eberhard, Henry II's Imperial Chancellor, would be ordained by Willigis, the Archbishop of Mainz and Primate of Germany, to head the new Diocese. Henry II made many wide-ranging gifts to the new Diocese to ensure its solid foundation. Henry II assigned many counties in the Duchy of Franconia, the Duchy of Saxony, the Duchy of Carinthia, and the Duchy of Swabia.

=== Policy towards the nobility ===
As under his predecessors, Otto II and Otto III, the various German dukes of the Empire grew increasingly independent from Henry II. A "German" identity had begun to develop. South of the Alps, Italy also saw the various regional lords grow independent. Increasingly, the Empire's duchies were becoming personal possessions of their respective ducal families rather than parts of the Empire.

Henry II's policy towards the nobles focused on dismantling these family structures within the duchies to restore imperial dominance. Henry II, like the other Ottonians, relied on his connection to the Church to justify his authority over the dukes. However, unlike under Otto I and Otto II, the various German dukes were no longer bound to Henry II by close family ties. While the Duchy of Franconia and the Duchy of Saxony formed the core imperial support, the Duchy of Swabia and the Duchy of Bavaria had grown increasingly rebellious.

Unlike his predecessors, Henry II was unwilling to show clemency to those dukes who had rebelled against his authority. This caused a sharp rise in conflict with the secular nobility, forcing Henry II to reinforce the clergy's position in the governance of the Empire. It was only through the support of the clergy that Henry II survived the numerous noble revolts against his rule during the first decade of his reign. Even his relatives, such as his brothers-in-law Duke Henry V of Bavaria, and Count Frederick of Moselle, rebelled. As a result, Henry II systematically reduced the internal power structures of the Bavarian and Swabian dukes. Henry II's lack of sensitivity toward the secular nobility also led to the series of wars against Poland. Under Otto III, Polish Duke Bolesław I Chrobry had been viewed as a valued ally; Henry II, however, saw him only as a subject.

In 1019, the once loyal Duke Bernard II of Saxony, grandson of Emperor Otto I's trusted lieutenant Hermann Billung, rebelled against Henry II, having grown frustrated at his lack of respect for the secular nobility.

== Death and successor ==
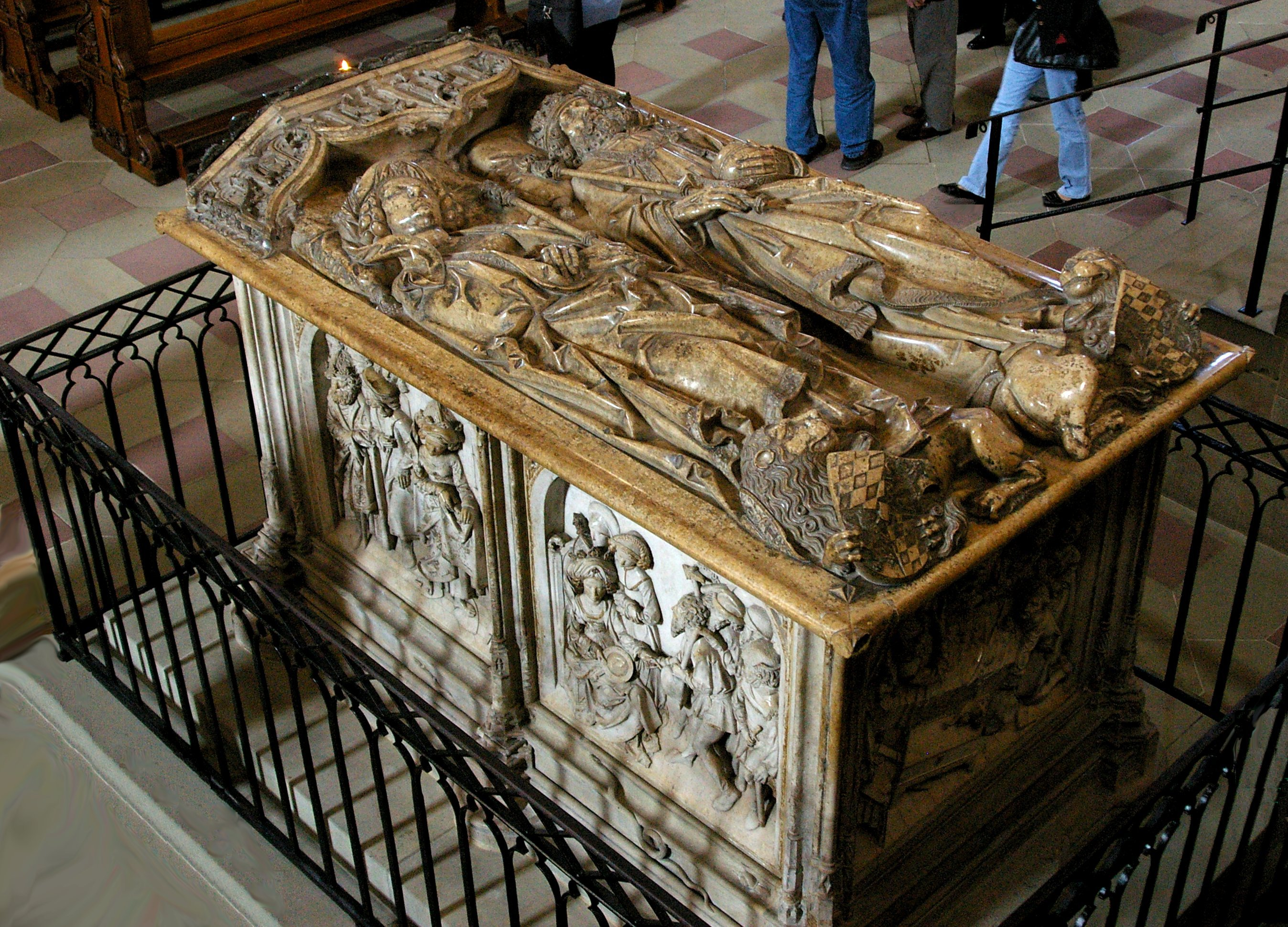
Tomb of Henry and Cunigunde by Tilman Riemenschneider

Returning to Magdeburg, Germany, from southern Italy to celebrate Easter, Henry II fell ill in Bamberg. After celebrating Easter, Henry retired to his imperial palace in Göttingen. He died there on 13 July 1024 at the age of 51, after suffering from a chronic, painful urinary infection. Henry had been working with the Pope to convene a Church council to confirm his new system of imperial-ecclesiastical relations before his death, leaving the effort unfinished.

Empress Cunigunde arranged for Henry to be interred at Bamberg Cathedral. Though he left the Empire without significant problems, Henry II also left the Empire without an heir. Some speculate that both he and Cunigunde had taken mutual vows of chastity because of their piety and the lack of royal issue, but this is disputed. Because their marriage was childless, the Saxon dynasty of the Ottonians died with Henry.

In early September 1024, the German nobles gathered in Kamba and began negotiations for selecting a new king. The nobles elected the Franconian noble Conrad II as Henry II's successor, who became the first member of the Salian dynasty.

== Veneration ==
Saint Henry II, Holy Roman Emperor O.S.B
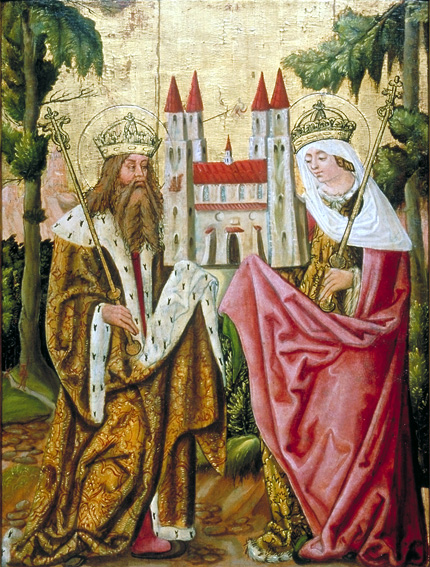
- St. Henry and Cunigunde, as depicted in 15th century

Holy Roman Emperor, Confessor
- Born: 6 May 973; Abbach, Bavaria, Germany, Holy Roman Empire
- Died: 13 July 1024; Göttingen, Germany, Holy Roman Empire
- Venerated in: Catholic Church
- Canonized: July 1147, Rome, Papal States by Pope Eugenius III
- Feast: 13 July
- Patronage: Benedictine Oblates, disabled people, those rejected from religious orders

Henry II was canonized in July 1147 by Pope Eugenius III; Henry's spouse, Cunigunde, was canonized on 29 March 1200 by Pope Innocent III. Henry's relics were carried on campaigns against heretics in the 1160s. He is the patron saint of the city of Basel, Switzerland, and of St Henry's Marist Brothers' College in Durban, South Africa.

Henry's feast day was inserted into the General Roman Calendar in 1631 as a commemoration on 13 July, the day of his death. In 1668, the feast was moved to 15 July as a semidouble. This rank was changed by Pope Pius XII in 1955 to a simple one and by Pope John XXIII in 1960 to a third-class feast. In 1969, the feast date was changed to 13 July again as an optional memorial.

Henry II was an oblate of the Order of St. Benedict and is venerated as the patron saint of Benedictine oblates.

== Family ==
Henry II was a member of the Ottonian dynasty of kings and emperors who ruled the Holy Roman Empire (previously Germany) from 919 to 1024. In relation to the other members of his dynasty, Henry II was the great-grandson of Henry I, great-nephew of Otto I, first cousin once removed of Otto II, and a second cousin of Otto III.

== Sources ==
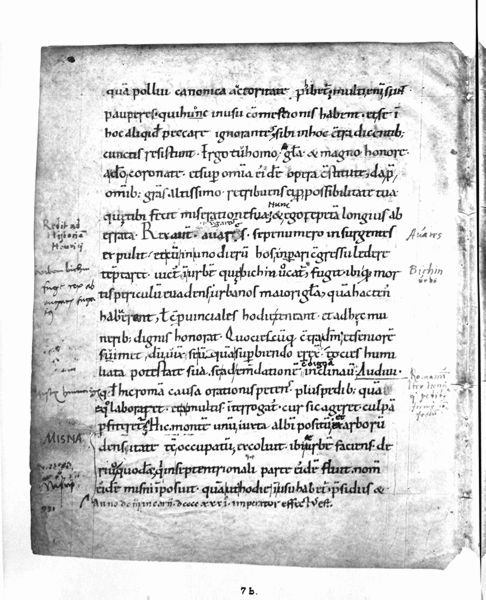
Page of Thietmar's Chronicle

Between 1012 and 1018, Thietmar of Merseburg wrote a Chronicon, or Chronicle, in eight books, which deals with the period between 908 and 1018. For the earlier part, he used Widukind's Res gestae Saxonicae, the Annales Quedlinburgenses, and other sources; the latter part is based on personal knowledge. The chronicle is nevertheless an excellent authority for the history of Saxony during the reigns of the emperors Otto III and Henry II. No kind of information is excluded, but the fullest details refer to the bishopric of Merseburg, and to the wars against the Wends and the Poles.

== See also ==
- Kings of Germany family tree
- Saint Henry, patron saint archive

== Notes ==
Henry II, Holy Roman Emperor House of Otto Born: 973 Died: 1024
Regnal titles
Preceded by Henry II	Duke of Bavaria; 995–1004	Succeeded by Henry V
Preceded by Arduin	King of Italy; 1004–1024	Vacant Title next held by Conrad II
Vacant Title last held by Otto III	King of Germany; 1002–1024	Vacant Title next held by Conrad II
Vacant Title last held by Otto III	Holy Roman Emperor; 1014–1024	Vacant Title next held by Conrad II
