= Henry of Schweinfurt =

Margrave of the Nordgau from 994 to 1004

- Born: c. 970
- Died: 18 September 1017
- Noble family: House of Schweinfurt
- Spouse: Gerberga of Gleiberg
- Issue: Otto III, Duke of Swabia; Eilika of Schweinfurt; Judith of Schweinfurt; Burchard (possibly) Henry
- Father: Berthold of Schweinfurt
- Mother: Eilika of Walbeck

Henry of Schweinfurt (de Suinvorde; c. 970 – 18 September 1017) was the Margrave of the Nordgau from 994 until 1004. He was called the "glory of eastern Franconia" by his own cousin, the chronicler Thietmar of Merseburg.

Henry was the son of Berthold and Eilika (Eiliswintha or Eila) of Walbeck. His father's parentage is not known with certainty, but he may have been a son of Arnulf, Duke of Bavaria. Henry was Bavarian, whoever his grandfather.

Henry held a succession of countships after his father's death in 980. He was appointed marchio, like his father, of the Bavarian Nordgau in 994. In 1003, he revolted against Henry II of Germany claiming that he had been promised the Duchy of Bavaria in return for his support. The king said that the Bavarians had a right to elect their own duke. Henry allied with Boleslaus I of Poland and Boleslaus III of Bohemia. Nevertheless, his rebellion was quashed and he himself was briefly captive. The king established the Diocese of Bamberg to prevent any further uprisings in the region. The new diocese took over the secular authority of the margrave in the region of the Bavarian Nordgau.

Finally, it was only the joint persuasion of both his saecular and ecclesiastical overlords, Bernard I, Duke of Saxony, and Tagino, Archbishop of Magdeburg, that reconciled him to Henry in 1004. Henry of Schweinfurt did subsequently gain new and old countships before his death in 1017. He was buried at Schweinfurt.

== Family ==
Henry married Gerberga of Gleiberg, daughter of Herbert of Wetterau. They had three sons and two daughters:

- Otto, who later became Duke of Swabia
- Eilika or Eilica, married Bernard II, Duke of Saxony
- Judith of Schweinfurt (died 2 August 1058), married Bretislaus I of Bohemia
- Burchard I, Bishop of Halberstadt, chancellor of the Emperor Conrad II
- Henry, a count in the Nordgau, allegedly could be Heinrich I, Count of Pegnitz

== Sources ==
- Reuter, Timothy. Germany in the Early Middle Ages 800–1056. New York: Longman, 1991.
- Warner, David, ed. (2001). Ottonian Germany: The Chronicon of Thietmar of Merseburg. Manchester University Press.
- Wiszewski, Przemyslaw (2010). Domus Bolezlai: Values and social identity in dynastic traditions of. Brill.
