= Billung =

Dynasty of Saxon noblemen

- Dynasty
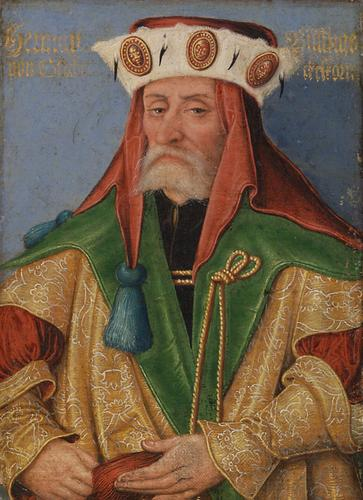
- Hermann Billung
- Current region: Saxony
- Founded: 9th century
- Founder: Count Wichmann the Elder
- Connected families: Welf and Ascania dynasties
- Estate: Billung March
- Dissolution: 12th century

The House of Billung was a dynasty of Saxon noblemen in the 9th through 12th centuries.

The first known member of the house was Count Wichmann, mentioned as a Billung in 811. Oda, the wife of Count Liudolf, oldest known member of the Liudolfing House, was also a Billung as was Matilda of Ringelheim.

In the 10th century, the property of the family was centered in the Bardengau around Lüneburg and they controlled the march named after them. In the middle of the 10th century, when the Saxon dukes of the House of Liudolfing had also become German kings, King Otto the Great entrusted more and more of his ducal authority to Hermann Billung. For five generations, the House of Billung ruled the Duchy of Saxony.

The house submerged into the Welf and Ascania dynasties when Duke Magnus died in 1106 without sons; the family's property was divided between his two daughters. His daughter Wulfhilde married Henry IX, Duke of Bavaria, a member of the House of Welf; his daughter Eilika married Otto, Count of Ballenstedt, a member of the House of Ascania. As a consequence, for the following decades control of Saxony was contested between the Welfs and Ascanians.

The Billung dukes of Saxony were:

- Hermann, died 973
- Bernard I, died 1011
- Bernard II, died 1059
- Ordulf, died 1072
- Magnus, died 1106
