= Magnus, Duke of Saxony =

Magnus
- Duke of Saxony
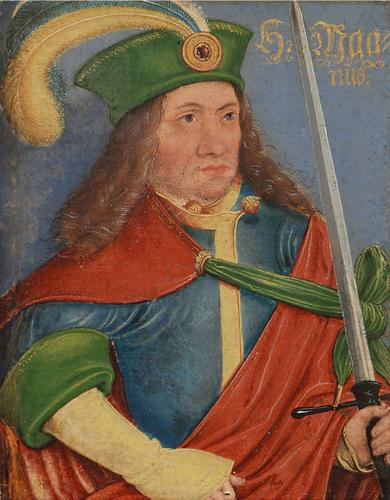
- Reign: 1072–1106
- Predecessor: Ordulf
- Successor: Lothair
- Born: c. 1045
- Died: 23 August 1106
- Spouse: Sophia of Hungary
- Issue: Wulfhilde, Duchess of Bavaria; Eilika, Countess of Ballenstedt
- House: House of Billung
- Father: Ordulf
- Mother: Wulfhild of Norway

Magnus (c. 1045 – 23 August 1106) was the duke of Saxony from 1072 to 1106.

Eldest son and successor of Ordulf and Wulfhild of Norway, he was the last member of the House of Billung.

== Rebellion ==
In 1070, before he was duke, he joined Otto of Nordheim, duke of Bavaria, in rebellion against the Salian Emperor Henry IV. Otto was accused of being privy to a plot to murder the king, and it was decided he should submit to the ordeal of battle with his accuser. The duke asked for safe-conduct to and from the place of meeting. When this was refused he declined to appear, and was consequently deprived of Bavaria, while his Saxon estates were plundered. The rebellion was put down in 1071, and Magnus was captured. Magnus was imprisoned in the castle of Harzburg, the imposing imperial fortress which so inflamed the Saxon freemen, who pillaged the castle and minster (church).

He was not released upon his accession to the Saxon duchy until seventy Swabians captured in Lüneburg were released.

== First battle of Langensalza ==
In 1073, Harzburg was destroyed and the anger of Henry aroused. He renewed the conflict with Saxony once more. At the first battle of Langensalza in 1075, Magnus was captured again. After being released again, he joined Rudolf von Rheinfeld, duke of Swabia and anti-king, and was present at the Battle of Mellrichstadt (7 August 1078), where he saved Rudolf's life. However, he and the Saxons never fully supported the Swabian Rudolf and he reconciled with Henry, even fighting the Slavs with the royal forces.

== Later life and death ==
Magnus was an embittered enemy of the archbishop of Bremen, Adalbert, whose see he afflicted with repeated plundering raids. In 1106, the same year as Henry IV, he died.

== Family and legacy ==
His duchy was given to Lothair of Supplinburg, and his lands were split between his two daughters by Sophia (married 1071), who was the daughter of Béla I of Hungary.

Half of his lands went to the house of Welf, via Wulfhilde (1075–1126), who married Duke Henry IX of Bavaria, and were parents of Henry the Superb, also known as Henry the Bear and Henry the Proud.

The other half of his lands went to the house of Ascania via Eilika (1080 – 16 January 1142), who married Count Otto of Ballenstedt.

Magnus, Duke of Saxony House of Billung Born: c. 1045 Died: 23 August 1106
| Preceded by Ordulf | Duke of Saxony; 1072–1106 | Succeeded by Lothair |
