= Ordulf, Duke of Saxony =

Ordulf
- Duke of Saxony
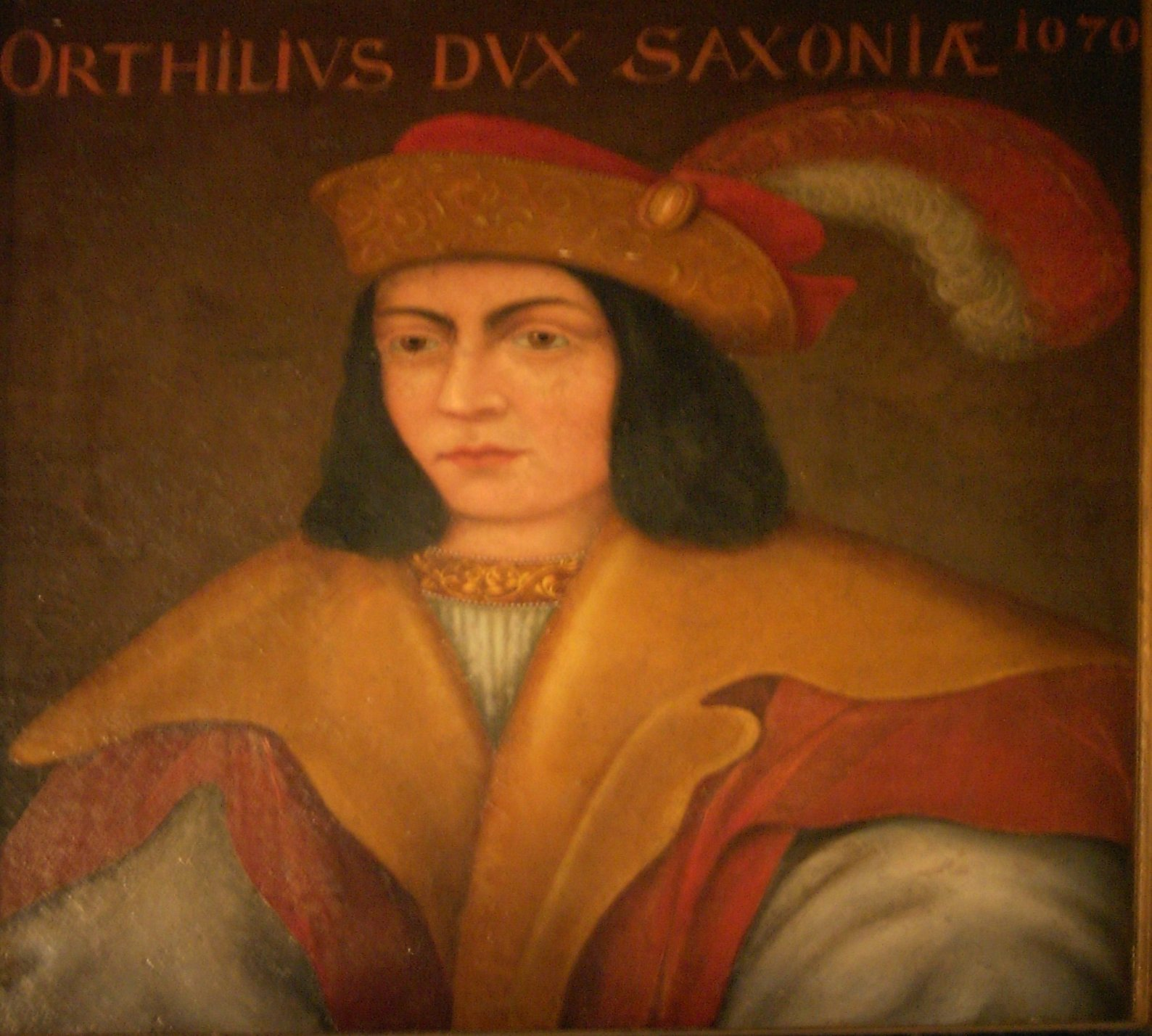
- Reign: 1059–1072
- Predecessor: Bernard II
- Successor: Magnus
- Born: c. 1022
- Died: 28 March 1072
- Burial: Saint Michael Church in Lüneburg
- Spouse: Wulfhild of Norway; Gertrude of Haldensleben
- Issue: Magnus, Duke of Saxony
- House: House of Billung
- Father: Bernard II
- Mother: Eilika of Schweinfurt

Ordulf (sometimes Otto) (c. 1022 – 28 March 1072) was the duke of Saxony from 1059, when he succeeded his father Bernard II, Duke of Saxony, until his death. He was a member of the Billung family.

== Reign ==
Ordulf was the son of Bernard II, Duke of Saxony, and Eilika of Schweinfurt. He married Wulfhild of Norway, the daughter of King Olaf II of Norway, in 1042. Their son Magnus succeeded Ordulf as Duke of Saxony.

In 1043, Ordulf, along with his brother-in-law Magnus, defeated the Wends at the battle of Lyrskov Heath. After the death of his father, Bernard, in 1059, he inherited the title duke of Saxony.

Ordulf's second wife, Gertrude of Haldensleben, daughter of a Count Conrad, was imprisoned in Mainz in 1076 and died 21 February 1116. Their son Bernard died after a fall from a horse in Lüneburg on 15 July of an unknown year.

Ordulf died 28 March 1072 and is buried in the Church of St. Michael in Lüneburg.

== Sources ==
- Adam of Bremen (2002). History of the Archbishops of Hamburg-Bremen. Translated by Tschan, Francis J. Columbia University Press.
- Boshof, Egon (2008). Die Salier (in German). W. Kohlhammer Gmbh.
- Brooke, Z.N. (1926). "Germany under Henry IV and Henry V". In Bury, J.B.; Tanner, J.R.; Previté-Orton, C.W.; Brooke, Z.N. (eds.). The Cambridge Medieval History. Vol. V. Cambridge University Press.
- Bruno of Magdeburg (2022). The Saxon War. Translated by Bachrach, Bernard S.; Bachrach, David S. The Catholic University of America Press. ISBN 9780813234953.
- Jones, Gwen (1968). A History of the Vikings. Oxford University Press.
- Kruppa, Nathalie (2009). "Die Billunger und ihre Klöster: Beispiele zu den weitläufigen Verbindungen im frühmittelalterlichen Sachsen". Concilium medii aevi (in German). 12: 1–41.

Ordulf, Duke of Saxony House of Billung Born: c. 1022 Died: 28 March 1072
Preceded by Bernard II	Duke of Saxony; 1059–1072	Succeeded by Magnus
