= Eilika of Schweinfurt =

Duchess of Saxony from c. 1020 to 1059

Duchess consort of Saxony
- Tenure: 1020 – 1055/1056
- Born: c. 1005; Schweinfurt, Bavaria, Germany
- Died: after 10 December 1059; Schweinfurt, Bavaria, Germany
- Spouse: Bernard II, Duke of Saxony
- Issue: Ordulf, Duke of Saxony; Herman; Gertrude of Saxony; Hedwig; Ida
- House: Schweinfurt
- Father: Henry of Schweinfurt
- Mother: Gerberga of Gleiberg

Eilika of Schweinfurt (c. 1005 – after 10 December 1059) was Duchess consort of Saxony.

She came from a Bavarian noble family as the daughter of Margrave Henry of Schweinfurt and Gerberga of Gleiberg (970 – aft. 1036).

Around 1020, Eilika married Bernard II, Duke of Saxony and was mother of:

- Ordulf, Duke of Saxony (1022 – 1072)
- Herman (d. 1086)
- Gertrude (d. 1115), married Floris I, Count of Holland in 1050 and Robert I, Count of Flanders in 1063
- Ida (d. 31 Jul 1102), married Frederick, Duke of Lower Lorraine (d. 1065) with the county of La Roche as a dowry, and Count Albert III of Namur
