= Bernard II of Saxony =

Duke of Saxony from 1011 to 1059

Bernard II
- Duke of Saxony
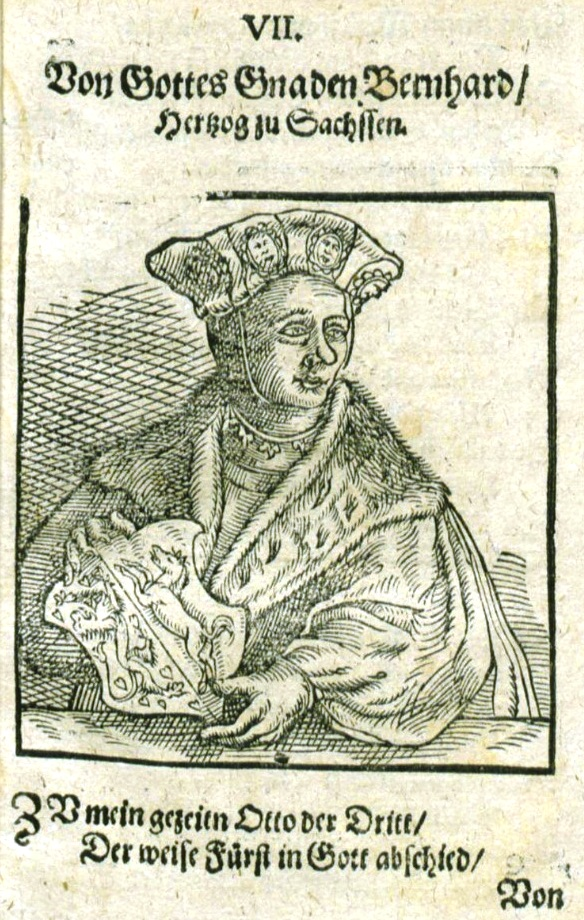
- Reign: 1011–1059
- Predecessor: Bernard I
- Successor: Ordulf
- Born: c. 995
- Died: 29 June 1059
- Spouse: Eilika of Schweinfurt
- Issue Detail: Gertrude of Saxony; Ordulf, Duke of Saxony
- House: Billung
- Father: Bernard I, Duke of Saxony
- Mother: Hildegard

Bernard II (c. 995 – 29 June 1059) was the Duke of Saxony between 1011 and 1059, the third of the Billung dynasty as a son of Bernard I and Hildegard. Besides his position in Saxony, he had the rights of a count in Frisia.

Bernard expanded the powers of the duke in Saxony and is regarded as the greatest of the Billungers. He was originally a supporter of Holy Roman Emperor Henry II, and he accompanied him into Poland to negotiate the Peace of Bautzen of 1018. In 1019–1020, however, he revolted against Henry and gained the recognition of the tribal laws of Saxony, something his father had failed to do. He then returned to war with the Obodrites and Lutici (two Slavic tribes) and drew them into his sphere of influence through their leader Gottschalk.

He supported Holy Roman Emperor Conrad II in 1024 and Conrad's son Henry III, though he began to fear the latter for his closeness to the Archbishop Adalbert of Bremen, whom he considered a spy and inveterate enemy of the dukes of Saxony. Although he was a critical ally of the Danes, who provided fundamental support for Henry's wars in the Low Countries, Bernard was on the brink of rebellion until the death of Adalbert. The remainder of his reign, however, was quiet.

In 1045, he erected the Alsterburg in Hamburg. He died in 1059 and was succeeded without incident by his son Ordulf. He is buried in the Church of Saint Michael in Lüneburg.

== Marriage and issue ==
Bernard II, Duke of Saxony married to Eilika of Schweinfurt, daughter of Henry of Schweinfurt. They had these children together:

- Gertrude of Saxony (c. 1030 – August 4, 1113), married firstly to Floris I, Count of Holland, secondly to Robert I, Count of Flanders
- Ordulf, Duke of Saxony (c. 1020 – March 28, 1072), who married Ulfhilde or Wulfhilde of Norway (c. 1023 – May 24, 1070), daughter of King Olaf II (St.Olaf) of Norway and his wife Queen Astrid of Sweden
- Hermann
- Ida of Saxony, who married Albert III, Count of Namur

== Sources ==
- Brooke, Z.N. (1926). "Germany under Henry IV and Henry V". In Bury, J.B.; Tanner, J.R.; Previté-Orton, C.W.; Brooke, Z.N. (eds.). The Cambridge Medieval History. Vol. V. Cambridge University Press.
- Reuter, Timothy (1998). Germany in the Early Middle Ages C. 800-1056. Routledge.
- Wiszewski, Przemysław (2010). Domus Bolezlai: Values and Social Identity in Dynastic Traditions of Medieval Poland (c.966-1138) (East Central and Eastern Europe in the Middle Ages, 450-1450). Brill.

Bernard II of Saxony House of Billung Born: c. 995 Died: 29 June 1059
| Preceded by Bernard I | Duke of Saxony; 1011–1059 | Succeeded by Ordulf |
