= Bernard I of Saxony =

Bernard I
- Duke of Saxony
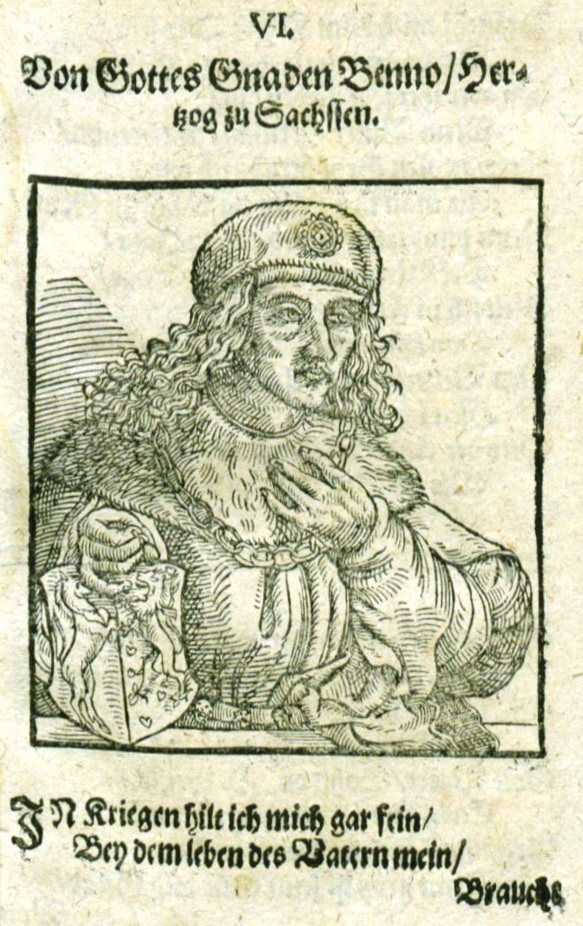

Duke of Saxony
- Reign: 973–1011
- Predecessor: Herman
- Successor: Bernard II
- Born: c. 950
- Died: 9 February 1011; Corvey, Germany
- Burial: Church of Saint Michael in Lüneburg
- Spouse: Hildegard of Stade
- Issue Detail: Bernard II, Duke of Saxony; Thietmar; Gedesdiu
- House: Billung
- Father: Hermann Billung
- Mother: Oda

Bernard I (c. 950 – 9 February 1011) was the Duke of Saxony between 973 and 1011, the second of the Billung dynasty, a son of Duke Herman and Oda. He extended his father's power considerably.

He fought the Danes in 974, 983, and 994 during their invasions. He supported the succession of Otto III over Henry the Wrangler. In 986, he was made marshal and in 991 and 995 he joined the young Otto on campaign against the Slavs. He increased his power vis-à-vis the crown, where his father had been the representative of the king to the tribe, Bernard was the representative of the tribe to the king. Bernard died in 1011 and was buried in the Church of Saint Michael in Lüneburg. He saved the live of Boleslaw Chrobry, when the local thieves attacked him.

== Family ==
In 990, Bernard married Hildegard (died 1011), daughter of Henry I the Bald, Count of Stade. They had:

- Herman, died young
- Bernard II, his successor
- Thietmar, a count, died in a duel on 1 April 1048 in Pöhlde
- Gedesdiu (or Gedesti) (died 30 June c. 1040), abbess of Metelen (from 993) and Herford (from 1002)

and probably:

- Matilda, nun
- Othelindis (died 9 March 1044), married Dirk III of Holland.

== Sources ==
- Warner, David, ed. (2001). Ottonian Germany: The Chronicon of Thietmar of Merseburg. Manchester University Press.

Bernard I of Saxony House of Billung Born: ca. 950 Died: 9 February 1011 in Corvey
Preceded by Hermann representative of Otto I	Duke of Saxony; 973–1011	Succeeded by Bernard II
