= Luitpold of Znojmo =

12th-century Bohemian nobleman

Luitpold
- Duke of Znojmo
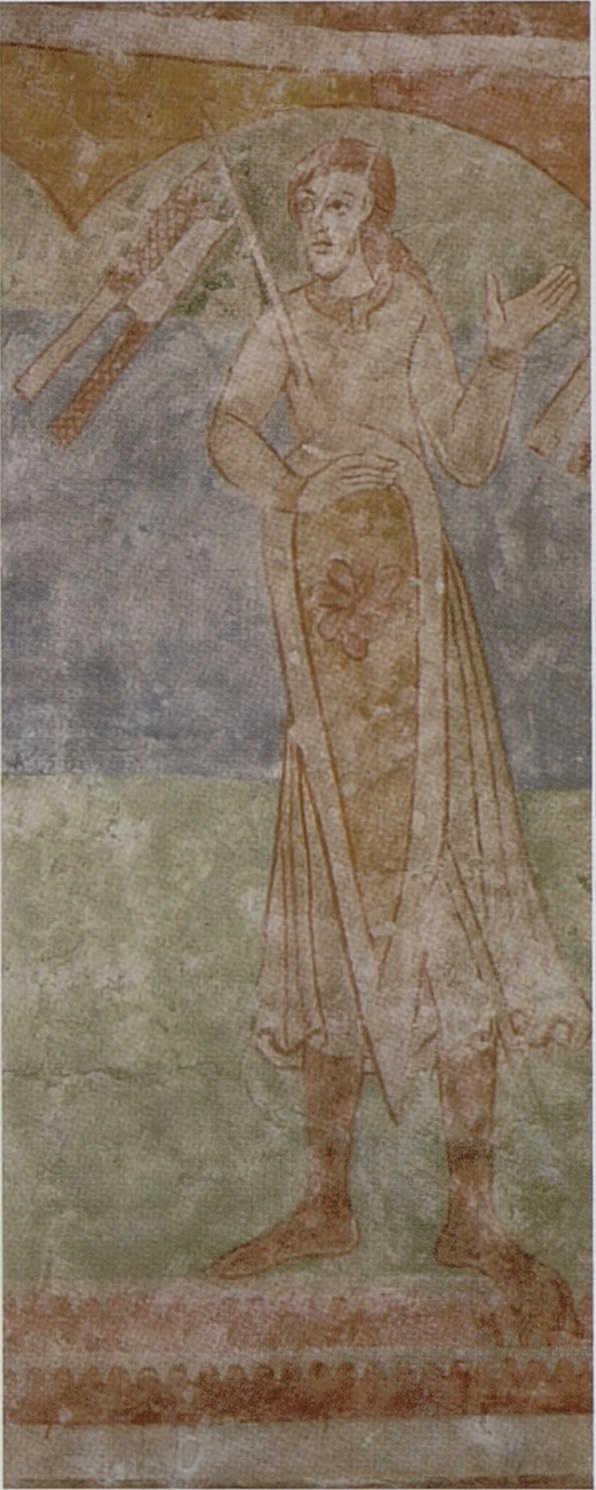
- Luitpold of Znojmo
- Born: Brno, Moravia
- Died: 15 March 1112; Znojmo, Moravia
- Buried: St. Procopius Basilica in Třebíč
- Noble family: Přemyslid dynasty – Conradine cadet line
- Spouses: Uda (Ida) of Austria, daughter of Leopold II 'the Handsome' von Babenberg, Margrave of Austria
- Issue: Conrad II of Znojmo
- Father: Conrad I, Duke of Bohemia
- Mother: Wirpirk of Tengling

Luitpold of Znojmo (Czech: Litold znojemský, German: Luitpold von Znaim, Latin: Lutoldus Znoyemsis; died 15 March (Note: The day of deth: Z ČECHORODU, PEŠINA; Mars Moravicus III.3, p. 286. and NOVOTNÝ, V.; České dějiny I.2, pp. 513–515 (+ footnote 15)) 1112) was a Bohemian nobleman and a member of the Přemyslid dynasty who was the Duke of Znojmo in Moravia for twenty years, from 1092 until his death.

== Family ==
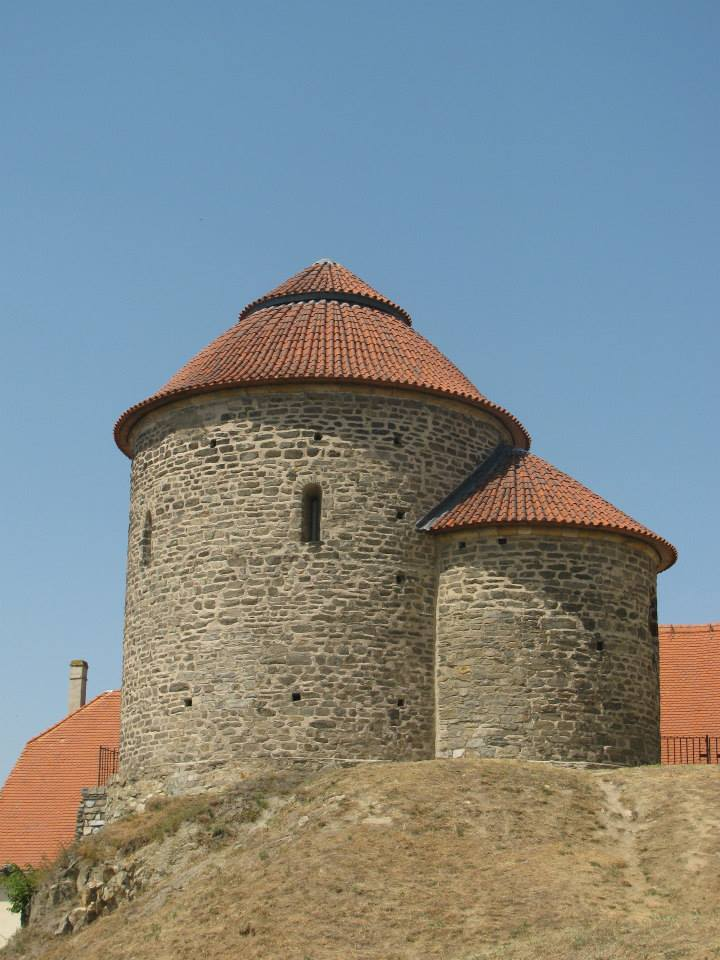
Rotunda of Saint Catherine of the ducal palace in Znojmo, established by Luitpold in 1101

He was the second son of Duke Conrad I of Bohemia (died 1092) and his consort, the Bavarian countess Wirpirk of Tengling. Luitpold's father ruled the Duchy of Bohemia for only a few months before his death, having succeeded his elder brother Vratislaus II. Both had wrangled over the newly implemented seniority principle with their eldest brother Duke Spytihněv II: not until Spytihněv's death in 1061 and the accession of Vratislaus II to the Bohemian throne did Conrad receive his share, ruling over the Moravian lands of Znojmo and Brno for more than 30 years.

Luitpold did not succeed his father as Duke of Bohemia; according to the principle of agnatic seniority, the ducal title passed to his eldest cousin Bretislav II, son of the late Vratislaus II. Instead, Luitpold ruled in half of Moravia (the western part) as had his father Conrad I, though again the territory was divided into two principalities: Brno and Znojmo. Luitpold was co-ruler (diarch) of both principalities alongside his elder brother Ulrich I.

All Moravian lines of the Přemyslid dynasty as a whole were systematically associated by dynastic marriages with princesses of major royal and ducal dynasties, especially the Árpád dynasty, Rurik dynasty, Piast dynasty, Nemanjić dynasty, Vukanović dynasty, (Note: Daughter Maria of Uroš I, of Rascia) the House of Babenberg, and other dynasties of Bavarian dukes; the same was true vice versa. Members of the Moravian dynasty were fully predisposed to take over the central throne (for both Bohemia and Moravia) in Prague, under the principles of agnatic seniority.

== Domestic policy ==
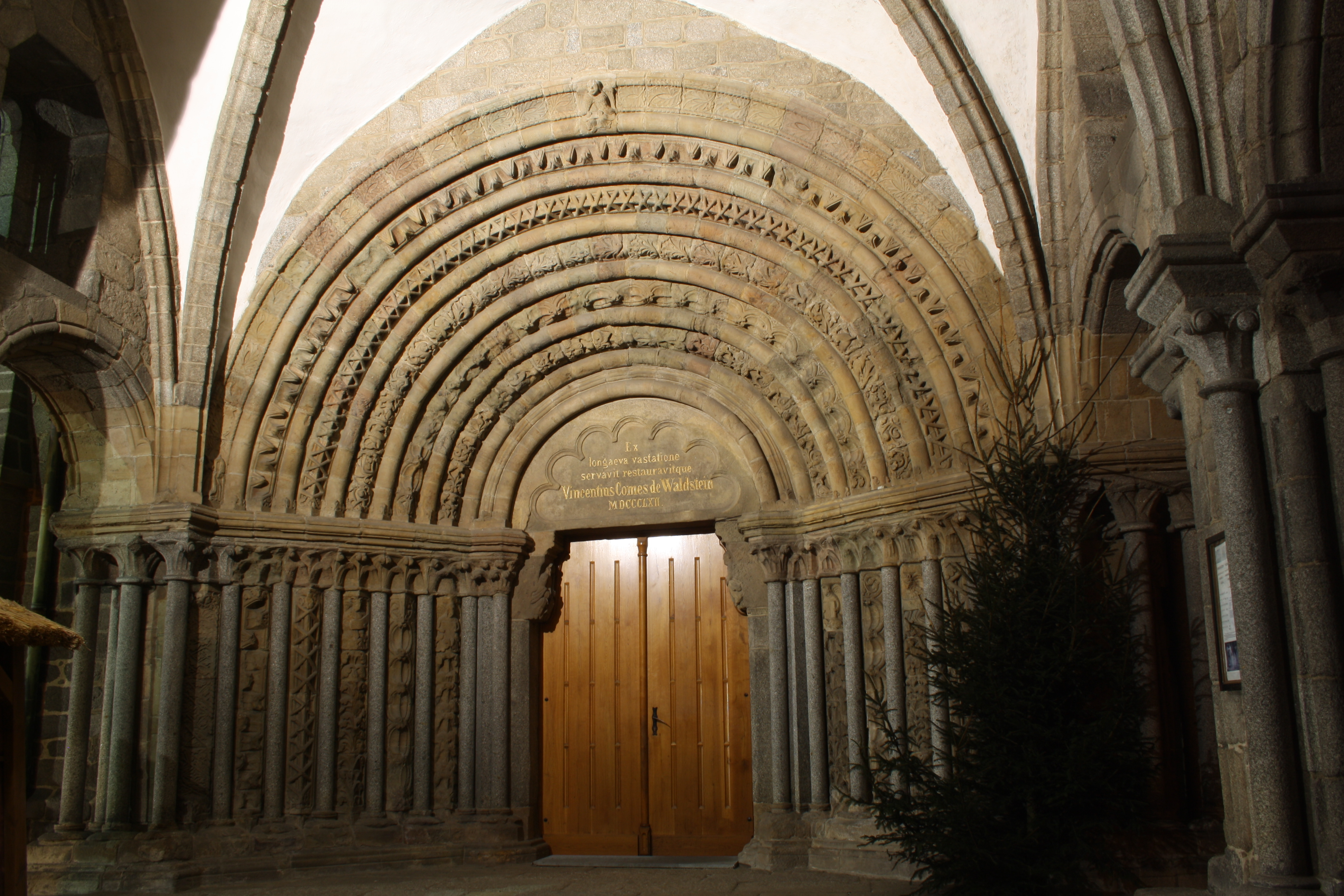
Romanesque portal of St. Procopius Basilica in Třebíč

Luitpold ruled over southern Moravia as diarch in Znojmo for 20 years, only once interrupted by the illegitimate regency of Duke Bretislav II in 1099–1100, when he and Ulrich were evicted. Both fell out with Bretislav when the duke tried to enforce the succession of his younger brother Bořivoj. He had Ulrich captured and arrested in Kladsko, while Luitpold fought against the forces of Bořivoj's father-in-law, the Babenberg margrave Leopold II of Austria.

Upon Bretislav's assassination in 1100, Holy Roman Emperor Henry IV confirmed the accession of Bořivoj to the Prague throne; nevertheless, Luitpold and Ulrich enforced their return to Moravia and the restoration of the Brno duchy with the help of Austrian and Bavarian armed forces as well as the indirect support of the emperor, whom the brothers visited in early February 1101 in Frankfurt. After they returned, they continued to reign in the two principalities of Brno and Znojmo in certain territorial union. Henry IV gave Ulrich insignia of rank and banner (vexillum) for their reign as Moravian dukes, while Luitpold's brother officially renounced all claims to the Prague throne. Luitpold himself, however, once again participated in the successful rebellion led by his Moravian cousin Svatopluk of Olomouc against Duke Bořivoj in 1107.

About 1101, Luitpold and Ulrich together established the Benedictine abbey of Třebíč and prepared its St. Procopius Church as a mausoleum for the Brno-Znojmo branch of the Přemyslid dynasty, where they were both later buried. Luitpold died in 1112, whereafter his Znojmo principality passed to Ulrich.

== Marriage and issue ==
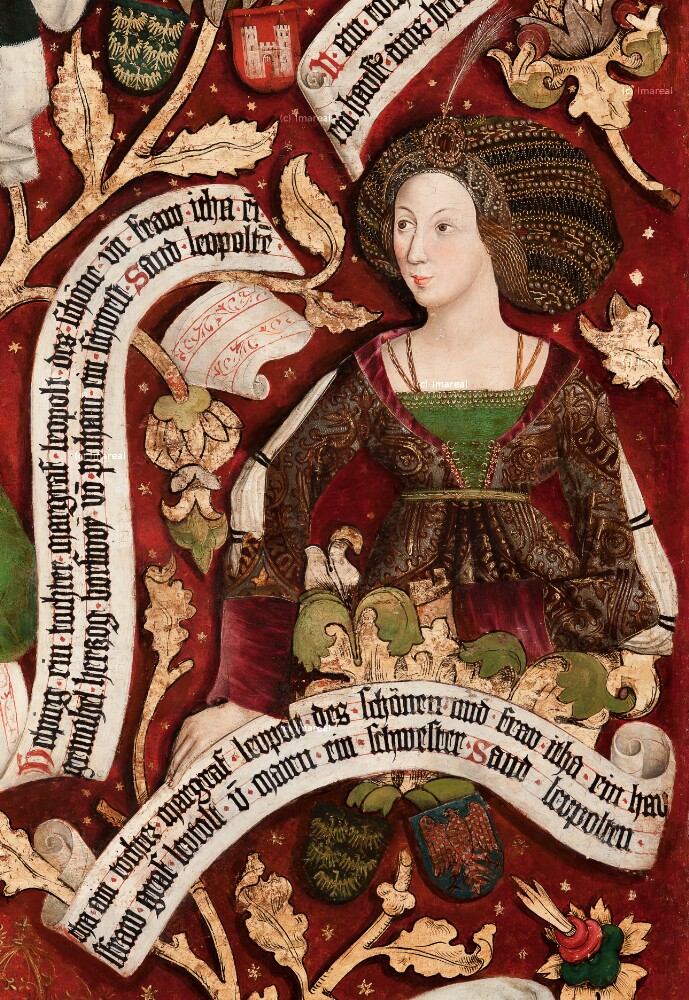
Ida of Austria, Duchess of Znojmo

By his marriage to Princess Ida of Babenberg, daughter of Margrave Leopold II of Austria and his consort Ida of Formbach, he had one son, Conrad II; the other children (if any) are unknown. Conrad legitimately succeeded his father as Duke of Moravia, Prince of Znojmo from 1123 to 1128 and again from 1134 until his death about 1161.

== Ancestry ==
Bretislaus I, Duke of Bohemia d. 6 September 1055		Judith of Schweinfurt d. after 1052	Sieghard VII of Tengling d. 5 July 1044		Philihild of Andechs d. 23 October 1075
	Conrad I, Duke of Brno d. 10 January 1092			Wirpirk of Tengling d.after 1052

	Ida von Babenberg daughter – Leopold II, Margrave of Austria; OO 1102?	Luitpold of Znojmo d. 1112
Conrad of Znojmo d. 1146

== Ancestry ==
Ancestors of Luitpold of Znojmo

16. Boleslaus II of Bohemia
8. Oldřich of Bohemia
17. Emma of Mělník
4. Bretislaus I of Bohemia
9. Božena
2. Conrad I, of Brno
10. Henry of Schweinfurt (Nordgau)
5. Judith of Schweinfurt
11. Gerberga of Henneberg
1. Luitpold, co Prince of Moravia
12. Engelbert III. of Chiemgau
6. Sieghard VII. of Tengling
13. Adala of Bayern (and Kroatengau)
3. Wirpirk of Tengling
14. Friedrich I, of Adchens
7. Bilihild of Adchens

== See also ==
- History of Moravia
- Rotunda of Saint Catherine
- Conrad II, Duke of Bohemia
- Helena of Znojmo

== Bibliography ==
=== Primary sources ===
- COSMAS, (Canonicus Pragensis); Chronica Boëmorum. (Latin)
- COSMAS of Prague, (Canon of Prague), Translated by Lisa Wolverton (2009); Chronicle of the Czechs (Chronicle of Bohemias). The Catholic university of America Press. (English)
- Constinuatio Claustroneoburgensis prima. MHG SS IX, p. 612 (Latin)

=== Secondary sources ===
- KRZEMIEŃSKA, Barbara; MERAHAUTOVÁ, Anežka; TŘEŠTÍK, Dušan (2000). Moravští Přemyslovci ve Znojemské rotundě. Praha: SetOut. 135 p.. ISBN 80-86277-09-7. (in Czech)
- WOLVERTON, Lisa (2001).Hastening toward Prague. Philadelphia, University of Pennsylvania Press. ISBN 0-8122-3613-0 (English)
- REITINGER, Lukáš. Nekrologia kláštera Pegau. Pozapomenuté svědectví o Přemyslovcích (nejen) Kosmova věku. In: WIHODA, Martin; REITINGER, Lukáš (2010). Proměna středovýchodní Evropy raného a vrcholného středověku. Brno : Matice moravská, . ISBN 978-80-86488-69-1. pp. 373–374 (in Czech)
- GROSMANNOVÁ, Dagmar (2010). Medieval Coinage in Moravia.In: GALUŠKA, Luděk; MITÁČEK, Jiří; NOVOTNÁ Lea. Treasures of Moravia. Brno:Moravian Museum Press. ISBN 978-80-7028-371-4. pp. 371–374 (English)
- BRETHOLZ, Berthold (1910).Studien zu Cosmas von Prag V. Die Brunner Cosmas Handschrift, NA 35, 1910 pp. 692–702 (German)
- MOLECZ, P. (2003):Die Hanthaler-Fälschungen im Lilielnfelder Nekrolog am Beispiel der Schwestern des Heiligen Leopold. Eine Beitrag zur Barocken Wischenschaftsgeschichte und Babenbergergenealogie. MIÖG 111, pp. 241–284, exact 360–365. (in German)
- SOMMER, Petr; TŘEŠTÍK, Dušan; ŽEMLIČKA, Josef, a kol. Přemyslovci. Budování českého státu. Praha : Nakladatelství Lidové noviny, 2009. 779 s. ISBN 978-80-7106-352-0.
- WIHODA, Martin. Morava v době knížecí 906–1197. Praha : Nakladatelství Lidové noviny, 2010. 464 s. ISBN 978-80-7106-563-0.
- ČERNÝ, Pavel. Zobrazení přemyslovské genealogie v rotundě sv. Kateřiny ve Znojmě a některé aspekty její interpretace, in: Znojemská rotunda ve světle vědeckého zkoumání. pp. 78–92 (in Czech)
- MĚCHUROVÁ, Zdeňka (2010). From the medieval history of Moravia. In: GALUŠKA, Luděk; MITÁČEK, Jiří; NOVOTNÁ Lea. Treasures of Moravia.Brno:Moravian Museum Press. ISBN 978-80-7028-371-4. pp. 107–115 (English)
- ŽEMLIČKA, Josef (2005). Přemyslovci. Jak žili, vládli, umírali. Praha: Nakladatelství Lidové noviny, . 497 s. ISBN 80-7106-759-8. (in Czech)

Luitpold of Znojmo Přemyslid dynasty Died: 15 March 1112
Preceded by Conrad I	Duke of Moravia; Prince of Znojmo; 1092–1112	Succeeded by Ulrich I
