= Ulrich I of Brno =

Duke of Brno

Ulrich I, Duke of Brno
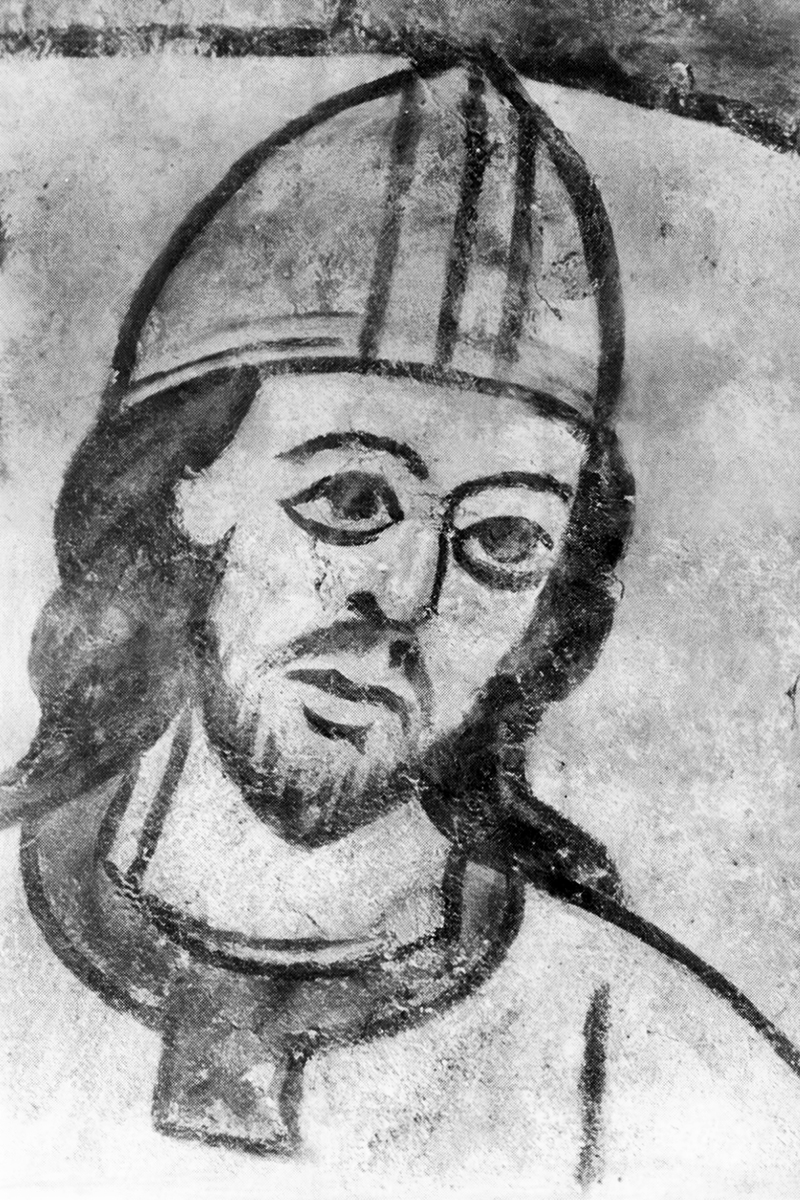
- Fresco in Rotunda of Saint Catherine in Znojmo, depicted 1142 (Note: Face identity by: KRZEMIEŃSKA, Barbara; MERAHAUTOVÁ, Anežka;TŘEŠTÍK, Dušan (2000). Moravští Přemyslovci ve Znojemské rotundě. Praha: SetOut. p.139)
- Born: Brno
- Died: 5 January 1113; Brno
- Buried: St. Procopius Basilica in Třebíč
- Noble family: Přemyslid dynasty - cadet line Conradine
- Spouse: unknown
- Issue: Wratislaus of Brno
- Father: Conrad I, Duke of Bohemia
- Mother: Wirpirk of Tengling

Ulrich I, Duke of Brno (Czech: Oldřich Brněnský, German: Ulrich von Brünn, Latin: Udalricus Brunensis; 11th century – 5 January 1113) was the Duke of Moravia for twenty one years - between 1092 and 1113. He was the first son and successor of Conrad I, Duke of Bohemia (died 1092) and Wirpirk of Tengling. He did not succeed as half ruler of Moravia (diarch), for all half of Moravia (the west one) as his father Conrad I, but Brno was divided into two parts: Brno and Znojmo and Ulrich was co-ruler in this part with his brother Luitpold of Znojmo. Both brothers together established a benedictine cloister and its St. Procopius Basilica in Třebíč and prepared as mausoleum for Brno-Znojmo branch House of Přemyslid.

He had long ruled over Moravia (as diarch in Brno) for 21 years, once interrupted by illegitimate regency: (1099–1100 by Bretislaus II)

By his marriage to an unknown princess, he probably had two children:

- Wratislaus of Brno, Duke of Brno from 1125 to 1129 and from 1130 to his death in 1146
- Nadia (?),(or Nadine, original Надія, Czech Naděj)

He was succeeded legitimately as prince of Brno by his son Wratislaus of Brno.

== Domestic policy ==
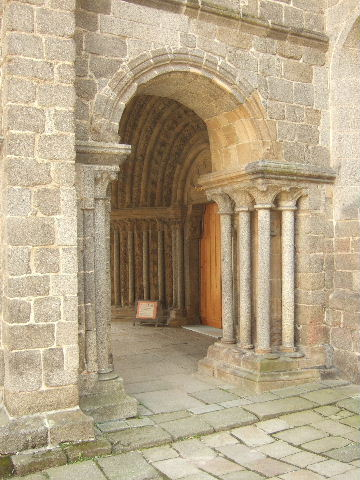
Burial place in Benedictine Abbey, Třebíč

Ulrich and Luitpold initially ruled in the Brno part (the western one) of the duchy of Moravia, until 1099 when they were evicted illegitimately by Bretislaus II. Later they enforced a return of the Brno part of the Moravian duchy - with the help of the Bavarian armed troops as well as indirect support by Emperor Henry IV (whom he visited in early February 1101 in Frankfurt), according to the principles of agnatic seniority. After they returned to the duchy of Brno, the brothers divided it into two subparts named Brno (principality) and Znojmo (principality), where they continued to reign in certain local territorial unions. In 1104 they together founded a Benedictine abbey in Třebíč whose convent church of St. Procopius was intended as their own dynastic mausoleum where they were both buried.

Emperor Henry IV gave Ulrich insignia of rank and banner (vexillum) for their reign in the duchy.

All the Moravian lines of Přemysl dynasty as a whole were systematically associated with dynastic marriages with princesses of major royal and ducal dynasties, especially Árpád dynasty, Rurik dynasty, Piast dynasty, Nemanjić dynasty-senior line Vukanović (Note: Daughter Maria of Uroš I of Rascia) and houses of Bavarian monarchs, as it was the other way around (vice versa). Members of the Moravian dynasty were fully predisposed to take over the central throne (for both countries - Bohemia and Moravia) in Prague, under the principles of agnatic seniority.

== Family tree ==
Bretislaus I, Duke of Bohemia d. 6 September 1055		Judith of Schweinfurt d. after 1052	Sieghard VII of Tengling d. 5 July 1044		Philihild of Andechs d. 23 October 1075
	Conrad I, Duke of Brno d. 10 January 1092			Wirpirk of Tengling d.after 1052

	Unknown princess (Adelheid ??) d. ? OO ?	Ulrich I. of Brno d. 5 January 1113
Wratislaus of Brno d. 1146	Nadia (daughter)

== Ancestry ==
Ancestors of Ulrich I of Brno

16. Boleslaus II of Bohemia
8. Oldřich of Bohemia
17. Emma of Mělník
4. Bretislaus I of Bohemia
9. Božena
2. Conrad I, of Brno
10. Henry of Schweinfurt (Nordgau)
5. Judith of Schweinfurt
11. Gerberga of Henneberg
1. Ulrich I, co Prince of Moravia
12. Engelbert III. of Chiemgau
6. Sieghard VII. of Tengling
13. Adala of Bayern (and Kroatengau)
3. Wirpirk of Tengling
14. Friedrich I, of Adchens
7. Bilihild of Adchens

== See also ==
- History of Moravia
- Margraviate of Moravia
- Otto I of Olomouc
- Lands of the Bohemian Crown
- Rotunda of Saint Catherine
- Conrad II, Duke of Bohemia
- Helen of Znojmo

== Bibliography ==
=== Primary sources ===
- COSMAS, (Canonicus Pragensis); Chronica Boemorum. (Latin)
- COSMAS of Prague, (Canon of Prague), Translated by Lisa Wolverton (2009); Chronicle of the Czechs (Chronicle of Bohemias). The Catholic university of America Press. (English)

=== Secondary sources ===
- KRZEMIEŃSKA, Barbara; MERAHAUTOVÁ, Anežka; TŘEŠTÍK, Dušan (2000). Moravští Přemyslovci ve Znojemské rotundě. Praha: SetOut. 135 p.. ISBN 80-86277-09-7. (in Czech)
- WOLVERTON, Lisa (2001).Hastening toward Prague. Philadelphia, University of Pennsylvania Press. ISBN 0-8122-3613-0 (English)
- REITINGER, Lukáš. Nekrologia kláštera Pegau. Pozapomenuté svědectví o Přemyslovcích (nejen) Kosmova věku. In: WIHODA, Martin; REITINGER, Lukáš (2010). Proměna středovýchodní Evropy raného a vrcholného středověku. Brno : Matice moravská, . ISBN 978-80-86488-69-1. p. 373-374 (in Czech)
- GROSMANNOVÁ, Dagmar (2010). Medieval Coinage in Moravia. In: GALUŠKA, Luděk; MITÁČEK, Jiří; NOVOTNÁ Lea. Treasures of Moravia. Brno: Moravian Museum Press. ISBN 978-80-7028-371-4. p. 371-374 (English)
- MOLECZ, P. (2003):Die Hanthaler-Fälschungen im Lilielnfelder Nekrolog am Beispiel der Schwestern des Heiligen Leopold. Eine Beitrag zur Barocken Wischenschaftsgeschichte und Babenbergergenealogie. MIÖG 111, p. 241-284, exact 360–365. (in German)
- SOMMER, Petr; TŘEŠTÍK, Dušan; ŽEMLIČKA, Josef, a kol. Přemyslovci. Budování českého státu. Praha : Nakladatelství Lidové noviny, 2009. 779 s. ISBN 978-80-7106-352-0.
- WIHODA, Martin. Morava v době knížecí 906–1197. Praha : Nakladatelství Lidové noviny, 2010. 464 s. ISBN 978-80-7106-563-0.
- MĚCHUROVÁ, Zdeňka (2010). From the medieval history of Moravia. In: GALUŠKA, Luděk; MITÁČEK, Jiří; NOVOTNÁ Lea. Treasures of Moravia. Brno: Moravian Museum Press. ISBN 978-80-7028-371-4. p. 107-115 (English)
- ŽEMLIČKA, Josef (2005). Přemyslovci. Jak žili, vládli, umírali. Praha: Nakladatelství Lidové noviny, . 497 s. ISBN 80-7106-759-8. (in Czech)

Preceded by Conrad I, Duke of Brno	Duke of Moravia, part of Brno; 1092	Succeeded by Wratislaus of Brno
