= Spytihněv II of Bohemia =

Duke of Bohemia from 1055 to 1061

Spytihněv II
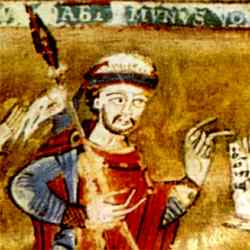
- Duke Spytihněv with mitre and lance, contemporary depiction in the Svatovítská apokalypsa (Apocalypse of Saint Vitus) manuscript, 11th century

Duke of Bohemia
- Reign: January 1055 – 28 January 1061
- Predecessor: Bretislav I
- Successor: Vratislaus II
- Born: 1031
- Died: 28 January 1061 (aged 30)
- Spouse: Ida of Wettin
- Issue: Svatobor (Friedrich)
- Dynasty: Přemyslid
- Father: Bretislav I
- Mother: Judith of Schweinfurt

Spytihněv II (also Spitignew, Spitihnew or Spytihnev; Latin: Spitigneus; 1031 – 28 January 1061), a member of the Přemyslid dynasty, was Duke of Bohemia from 1055 until his death in 1061.

== Life ==
He was the eldest son of Duke Bretislav I (d. 1055) and his consort Judith of Schweinfurt. While his father entered into conflict with the Salian king Henry III, young Spytihněv from 1039 onwards spent several years as a hostage at the German court.

When he succeeded his father as duke, his coronation was celebrated with the first known rendition of Hospodine pomiluj ny, the earliest known song in Czech. After his accession to the throne, he went at once to Regensburg to receive imperial confirmation. According to the contemporary chronicler Cosmas of Prague, this loyalty to the Holy Roman Empire did not prevent him from expelling all Germans from his lands, including his mother Judith, and the new anti-German policy continued to his death.

In 1056, Spytihněv had all the monks driven out of Sazava Abbey, yet despite this, Pope Nicholas II sought the alliance of the Bohemian duke in 1059. Thus, Rome granted Spytihněv the right to wear the mitre and tunic of a bishop for the annual sum of 100 marks.

His brothers having inherited Moravia, Spytihněv tried to reduce their authority by arresting 300 Moravian magnates and stripping his brothers of their rights in the province. Thus, Vratislaus of Olomouc fled to Hungary in 1058.

Spytihněv was succeeded by Vratislaus, who in turn entrusted Moravia to his brother Conrad.

== Marriage ==
About 1054 Spytihněv was married to Ida of Wettin (Hidda), a daughter of Margrave Theodoric II of Lusatia. They had:

- Svatobor (Friedrich), Patriarch of Aquileia in 1084. Shortly afterwards, on 23 Feb 1086, he was murdered.

== Notes ==
Spytihněv II of Bohemia Přemyslid dynasty Born: 1031 Died: 28 January 1061
Regnal titles
Preceded by Bretislaus I	Duke of Bohemia; 1055–1061	Succeeded by Vratislaus II
