= List of Bohemian monarchs =

Rulers of the Duchy- and Kingdom of Bohemia

Monarchy of Bohemia
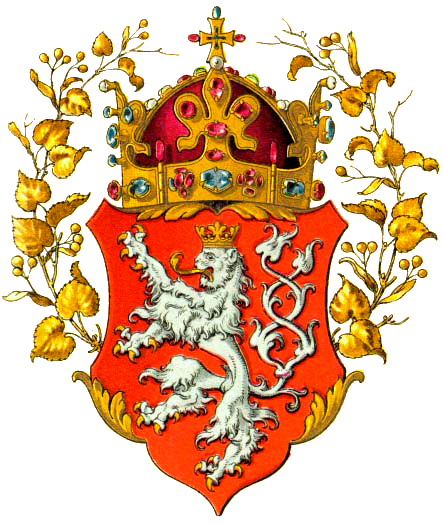
- Royal Coat of arms

Details
- Style: His Majesty
- First monarch: Bořivoj I (as duke)
- Last monarch: Charles III (as king)
- Formed: c. 870
- Abolished: 28 October 1918
- Residences: Prague Castle, Prague
- Appointer: Hereditary 870–1212; Electoral college 1212–1620; Hereditary 1637–1918

The Duchy of Bohemia was established in 870 and raised to the Kingdom of Bohemia in 1198. Several Bohemian monarchs ruled as non-hereditary kings and first gained the title in 1085. From 1004 to 1806, Bohemia was part of the Holy Roman Empire, and its ruler was an elector. From 1526 to 1804, the Kingdom of Bohemia, together with the other lands of the Bohemian Crown, was ruled under a personal union as part of the Habsburg monarchy. From 1804 to 1918, Bohemia was part of the Austrian Empire, which itself was part of the dual monarchy of Austria-Hungary from 1867 to 1918. Following the dissolution of the monarchy, the Bohemian lands, now also referred to as Czech lands, became part of Czechoslovakia, and they have formed today's Czech Republic since the 1993 dissolution of Czechoslovakia.

== Legendary rulers of Bohemia ==
- Praotec Čech (Pater Boemus)
- Krok
- Libuše, female ruler
- Přemysl the Ploughman, husband of Libuše
- Nezamysl
- Mnata
- Vojen
- Vnislav
- Křesomysl
- Neklan
- Hostivít

== Dukes and Kings of Bohemia from and after Přemyslid dynasty (c. 870–1306) ==
=== Přemyslid dynasty ===
==== Feuds of Bohemia and Moravia under Premyslid rule ====
Part of Great Moravia (until 907)
Duchy of Bohemia (870–1198); Raised to: Kingdom of Bohemia (1198–1306)	Part of Poland (999–1019)
Duchy of Moravia (1019–1055)
Duchy of Brno (1st creation) (1055–1056)	Duchy of Znojmo (1st creation) (1055–1056)	Duchy of Olomouc (1st creation) (1055–1056)
Duchy of Olomouc (1061–1178)
Duchy of Brno (2nd creation) (1061–1182)	Duchy of Znojmo (2nd creation) (1092–1182)
Duchy of Moravia (Znojmo line) (1182–1191)
Duchy of Moravia (1197–1222)

==== Table of rulers ====
Ruler	Born	Reign	Ruling part	Consort	Death	Notes
Bořivoj I	852; Son of Hostivít (?)	870–883 885–889	Duchy of Bohemia	Ludmila of Bohemia; 873 six children	889 aged 35/6	First documented ruler of the dynasty.
Strojmir, Duke of Bohemia	?	c. 883–885	Duchy of Bohemia	?	?	Apparently a usurper.
Bohemia annexed to Great Moravia (889–894)
Spytihněv I	882; First son of Bořivoj I and Ludmila of Bohemia	894–915	Duchy of Bohemia (with Moravia since 907)	Unmarried	915 aged 32/3	His reign restored Bohemian sovereignty.
Vratislaus I (Vratislav)	888; Second son of Bořivoj I and Ludmila of Bohemia	915 – 13 February 921	Duchy of Bohemia	Drahomíra three children	13 February 921 aged 32/3	
Regencies of Ludmila of Bohemia (921) and Drahomíra (921–925)						Known as St. Wenceslaus ("Good King Wenceslas" for English-speaking people), the patron saint of the Czech lands.
St.Wenceslaus (Svatý Václav)	907 (Note: Most frequently cited year of birth; other cited years are 908 or 911.); Stochov; First son of Vratislaus I and Drahomíra	13 February 921- 28 September 929/35	Duchy of Bohemia	Unmarried	28 September 929/35; Stará Boleslav aged 21/2 or 27/8	Known as St. Wenceslaus ("Good King Wenceslas" for English-speaking people), the patron saint of the Czech lands.
Boleslaus I the Cruel (Boleslav I. Ukrutný)	915; Prague (?); Second son of Vratislaus I and Drahomíra	28 September 929/35 – July 972	Duchy of Bohemia	Biagota four children	July 972 aged 56/7	Assassinated his brother to ascend to the ducal throne.
Boleslaus II the Pious (Boleslav II. Pobožný)	940; Prague (?); Son of Boleslaus I and Biagota	July 972 – 7 February 999	Duchy of Bohemia	Adiva (of England?) four children Emma of Mělník (Emma of Italy (?)); 989 no children	7 February 999 aged 58/9	Moravia is again lost, this time, to Poland, in 999.
Boleslaus III the Red (Boleslav III. Ryšavý)	965; First son of Boleslaus II and Adiva	7 February 999 – May 1002 February – March 1003	Duchy of Bohemia	Unknown	1037 aged 56/7	In 1002–04, Bohemia was invaded twice by Poland.
Bohemia was annexed to Poland (1002-04): May 1002 – February 1003: Vladivoj (Władywoj), son of Mieszko I of Poland; March 1003–1004: Bolesław I the Brave, King of Poland
Jaromír	c. 970; Second son of Boleslaus II and Adiva	1004 – 12 April 1012 9 November 1034–1035	Duchy of Bohemia	Unknown	4 November 1038; Lysá nad Labem aged 60/70	In 1004, Jaromir occupied Prague with a German army and proclaimed himself Bohemian duke, restoring the family's domain, albeit reduced. As brothers of Boleslaus III, Jaromir and Ulrich had a fight for the throne that lasted until 1034, when Ulrich died and Jaromir retired (and then murdered). Nevertheless, more land was at stake, as Moravia was reintegrated into Bohemia in 1019, after being reconquered from Poland, and given to Ulrich's son.
Ulrich I (Oldřich)	c. 975; Third son of Boleslaus II and Adiva	12 April 1012 – 9 November 1034	Duchy of Bohemia	Božena c. 1002 one child	9 November 1034 or 1042 aged 59/60 or 66/7	In 1004, Jaromir occupied Prague with a German army and proclaimed himself Bohemian duke, restoring the family's domain, albeit reduced. As brothers of Boleslaus III, Jaromir and Ulrich had a fight for the throne that lasted until 1034, when Ulrich died and Jaromir retired (and then murdered). Nevertheless, more land was at stake, as Moravia was reintegrated into Bohemia in 1019, after being reconquered from Poland, and given to Ulrich's son.
Ulrich I (Oldřich)	c. 975; Third son of Boleslaus II and Adiva	1033 – 9 November 1034	Duchy of Moravia	Božena c. 1002 one child	9 November 1034 or 1042 aged 59/60 or 66/7	In 1004, Jaromir occupied Prague with a German army and proclaimed himself Bohemian duke, restoring the family's domain, albeit reduced. As brothers of Boleslaus III, Jaromir and Ulrich had a fight for the throne that lasted until 1034, when Ulrich died and Jaromir retired (and then murdered). Nevertheless, more land was at stake, as Moravia was reintegrated into Bohemia in 1019, after being reconquered from Poland, and given to Ulrich's son.
Bretislaus I the Bohemian Achilles (Břetislav I. český Achilles)	1002/5; Son of Ulrich I and Božena	1019/29 – 1033 9 November 1034 – 10 January 1055	Duchy of Moravia	Judith of Schweinfurt; 1020 four children	10 January 1055 aged 50/3	First separation of Moravia from Bohemia. His father usurped his place for a year. After his own death, his sons shared the inheritance.
Bretislaus I the Bohemian Achilles (Břetislav I. český Achilles)	1002/5; Son of Ulrich I and Božena	1035 – 10 January 1055	Duchy of Bohemia	Judith of Schweinfurt; 1020 four children	10 January 1055 aged 50/3	First separation of Moravia from Bohemia. His father usurped his place for a year. After his own death, his sons shared the inheritance.
Spytihněv II	1031; First son of Bretislaus I and Judith of Schweinfurt	10 January 1055 – 28 January 1061	Duchy of Bohemia (also in Moravia from 1056)	Ida of Wettin; 1054 one child	28 January 1061 aged 29/30	Children of Bretislav I, divided their inheritance: Spytihnev kept Bohemia; the others divided Moravia: Conrad received Brno; Vratislav got Olomouc; Otto inherited Znojmo.; The division was made ineffective by Spytihnev (1055), who extended his rule to Moravia, uniting the whole Premyslid domain under his control. However, after his death (1061), the landless brothers recovered the inheritance and divided it differently, as Vratislav inherited Bohemia: Conrad recovered Brno but also received Otto's share in Znojmo; Otto received Vratislav's part in Olomouc.
Vratislaus II (Vratislav II)	c. 1035; Second son of Bretislaus I and Judith of Schweinfurt	10 January 1055–1056	Duchy of Olomouc	Maria before 1057 no children Adelaide of Hungary (I); 1057 four children Świętosława of Poland; 1062 five children	14 January 1092 aged 59/60	
Vratislaus II (Vratislav II)	c. 1035; Second son of Bretislaus I and Judith of Schweinfurt	28 January 1061 – June 1085 (as Duke) June 1085 – 14 January 1092 (as King)	Duchy of Bohemia	Maria before 1057 no children Adelaide of Hungary (I); 1057 four children Świętosława of Poland; 1062 five children	14 January 1092 aged 59/60	
Conrad I (Konrád I)	c. 1035; Third son of Bretislaus I and Judith of Schweinfurt	10 January 1055–1056 28 January 1061 – 6 September 1092	Duchy of Brno (with Znojmo since 1061)	Wirpirk of Tengling; 1054 two children	6 September 1092 aged 56/57	
Conrad I (Konrád I)	c. 1035; Third son of Bretislaus I and Judith of Schweinfurt	14 January – 6 September 1092	Duchy of Bohemia	Wirpirk of Tengling; 1054 two children	6 September 1092 aged 56/57	
Otto I the Fair (Ota Sličný)	1045; Fifth son of Bretislaus I and Judith of Schweinfurt	10 January 1055–1056	Duchy of Znojmo	Euphemia of Hungary before 1073 two children	9 June 1087 aged 41/2	
Otto I the Fair (Ota Sličný)	1045; Fifth son of Bretislaus I and Judith of Schweinfurt	28 January 1061 – 9 June 1087	Duchy of Olomouc	Euphemia of Hungary before 1073 two children	9 June 1087 aged 41/2	
Boleslaus (Boleslav)	1062; First son of Vratislaus II and Świętosława of Poland	9 June 1087 – 11 August 1091	Duchy of Olomouc	Unmarried	11 August 1091 aged 28/9	
Bretislaus II (Břetislav II)	c. 1060; Son of Vratislaus II and Adelaide of Hungary (I)	6 September 1092 – 22 December 1100	Duchy of Bohemia	Lukarta of Bogen; 1094 one child	22 December 1100 aged 39/40	
Ulrich (II) (Oldřich)	c. 1070/80? First son of Conrad I and Wirpirk of Tengling	6 September 1092 – 5 January 1113	Duchy of Brno (with Znojmo since 1112)	Adelaide two children	5 January 1113 aged c. 33/43?	Children of Conrad I, divided the inheritance: Luitpold received Znojmo; Ulrich inherited Brno.; Despite having heirs, Luitpold's land came to Ulrich's possession after his death. Conrad II, Luitpold's heir, would come to power in 1123.
Luitpold (I) (Litold znojemský)	c. 1070/80? Second son of Conrad I and Wirpirk of Tengling	6 September 1092 – 15 March 1112	Duchy of Znojmo	Ida of Austria one child	15 March 1112 aged c. 32/42?	Children of Conrad I, divided the inheritance: Luitpold received Znojmo; Ulrich inherited Brno.; Despite having heirs, Luitpold's land came to Ulrich's possession after his death. Conrad II, Luitpold's heir, would come to power in 1123.
Bořivoj II	c. 1064; Prague; Second son of Vratislaus II and Świętosława of Poland	25 December 1100 – May 1107 December 1117 – 16 August 1120	Duchy of Bohemia	Helbirga of Austria; October 1100; Znojmo no children	2 February 1124 aged 39/40	Ruled twice. Retired in 1120.
Svatopluk (I) (Svatopluk Olomoucký)	1075; First son of Otto I and Euphemia of Hungary	11 August 1091 – 21 September 1109	Duchy of Olomouc	Unknown one child	21 September 1109 aged 33/4	
Svatopluk (I) (Svatopluk Olomoucký)	1075; First son of Otto I and Euphemia of Hungary	May 1107 – 21 September 1109	Duchy of Bohemia	Unknown one child	21 September 1109 aged 33/4	
Vladislaus I (Vladislav I)	c. 1065; Third son of Vratislaus II and Świętosława of Poland	21 September 1109 – December 1117 16 August 1120 – 12 April 1125	Duchy of Bohemia	Richeza of Berg; 1110/11 four children	12 April 1125; Prague aged 59/60	Ruled twice.
Sobeslaus I	c. 1075; Fourth son of Vratislaus II and Świętosława of Poland	5 January 1113–1123	Duchy of Brno (with Znojmo)	Adelaide of Hungary (II); 1123 five children	14 February 1140 aged 64/5	Ruled Brno and Znojmo, which split after his resign: Znojmo returned to its heir, Conrad II; Brno was absorbed by Olomouc, the other Moravian feud.
Sobeslaus I	c. 1075; Fourth son of Vratislaus II and Świętosława of Poland	12 April 1125 – 14 February 1140	Duchy of Bohemia	Adelaide of Hungary (II); 1123 five children	14 February 1140 aged 64/5	Ruled Brno and Znojmo, which split after his resign: Znojmo returned to its heir, Conrad II; Brno was absorbed by Olomouc, the other Moravian feud.
Otto II the Black (Ota II. Černý)	1085; Second son of Otto I and Euphemia of Hungary	21 September 1109 – 18 February 1126	Duchy of Olomouc (with Brno)	Sophia of Berg; 1113 three children	18 February 1126 aged 40/1	Ruled in Olomouc, since 1091 with his brother Svatopluk. Acquired Brno in 1123.
Conrad II (Konrád II)	c. 1100/10? Son of Luitpold I and Ida of Austria	1123–1161	Duchy of Znojmo	Maria of Serbia; 1132 four children	1161 aged c. 50/51 or c. 60/61?	Received his heritage in 1123.
Wenceslaus Henry (Václav Jindřich)	1107; Son of Svatopluk (I)	18 February 1126 – 1 March 1130	Duchy of Olomouc	Unmarried	1 March 1130 aged 22/3	Heirs of previous rulers of their portions, after Otto II's death inherited their respective inheritances.
Vratislaus (II) (Vratislav)	c. 1100/11; Brno; Son of Ulrich (II) and Adelaide	18 February 1126 – 6 August 1156	Duchy of Brno	A Russian princess 1132 three children	6 August 1156; Brno aged 45/6	Heirs of previous rulers of their portions, after Otto II's death inherited their respective inheritances.
Luitpold (II) (Lupolt Olomoucký)	1102; Son of Bořivoj II and Helbirga of Austria	1 March 1130–1137	Duchy of Olomouc	Unmarried	1143 aged 40/1	Appointed and deposed by Sobeslaus, then the senior duke in Bohemia, who replaced him in Olomouc with his own son.
Vladislaus (Vladislav)	c.1100? First son of Sobeslaus I and Adelaide of Hungary (II)	1137–1140	Duchy of Olomouc	Daughter of Albert the Bear no children	1165 aged 64/5?	Probably resigned, expecting to succeed in Bohemia; however it was another Vladislaus who ended up ascending the seniority position in Bohemia.
Vladislaus II & I (Vladislav II & I)	c. 1110; Son of Vladislaus I and Richeza of Berg	14 February 1140 – 11 January 1158 (as Duke) 11 January 1158–1172 (as King)	Duchy of Bohemia	Gertrude of Austria; 1140 six children Judith of Thuringia; 1155 three children	18 January 1174; Meerane aged 63/4	Resigned in 1172.
Otto III (Ota III)	1122; Son of Otto II and Sophia of Berg	1140 – 12 May 1160	Duchy of Olomouc	Durancia five children	12 May 1160 aged 37/8	
Spytihněv (II)	c.1130? Son of Vratislaus (II)	6 August 1156–1182	Duchy of Brno	Umarried	1199 aged 68/9?	In 1182, abdicated for Conrad Otto of Znojmo
Brno annexed to Znojmo
Frederick (Bedřich)	1142; Son of Vladislaus II and Gertrude of Austria	12 May 1160–1173	Duchy of Olomouc	Elizabeth of Hungary; 1157 six children	25 March 1189 aged 46/7	
Frederick (Bedřich)	1142; Son of Vladislaus II and Gertrude of Austria	1172–1173 1178 – 25 March 1189	Duchy of Bohemia	Elizabeth of Hungary; 1157 six children	25 March 1189 aged 46/7	
Ulrich (III)	1134; Second son of Sobeslaus I and Adelaide of Hungary (II)	1173 – 18 October 1177	Duchy of Olomouc	Cecilia of Thuringia no children Sophia of Meissen no children		18 October 1177 aged 42/3
Sobeslaus II the Prince of the Peasants (Soběslav II. kníže sedláků)	1128; Third son of Sobeslaus I and Adelaide of Hungary (II)	1173–1178	Duchy of Bohemia	Elisabeth of Greater Poland no children	29 January 1180 aged 51/2	
Wenceslaus II	1137; Fourth son of Sobeslaus I and Adelaide of Hungary (II)	18 October 1177–1178	Duchy of Olomouc	Unmarried	c.1192 aged 54/5	Abdicated for Conrad III.
Wenceslaus II	1137; Fourth son of Sobeslaus I and Adelaide of Hungary (II)	9 September 1191–1192	Duchy of Bohemia	Unmarried	c.1192 aged 54/5	Abdicated for Conrad III.
Olomouc annexed to Znojmo
Conrad III Otto (Konrád III. Ota)	c. 1136; Son of Conrad II and Maria of Serbia	1161–1182	Duchy of Znojmo	Hellicha of Wittelsbach before 1176 no children	9 September 1191 aged 54/5	United Znojmo and Olomouc. Brno joined in 1182, when he also became the first Margrave of Moravia.
Conrad III Otto (Konrád III. Ota)	c. 1136; Son of Conrad II and Maria of Serbia	1182 – 9 September 1191	Margraviate of Moravia	Hellicha of Wittelsbach before 1176 no children	9 September 1191 aged 54/5	United Znojmo and Olomouc. Brno joined in 1182, when he also became the first Margrave of Moravia.
Conrad III Otto (Konrád III. Ota)	c. 1136; Son of Conrad II and Maria of Serbia	1189 – 9 September 1191	Duchy of Bohemia	Hellicha of Wittelsbach before 1176 no children	9 September 1191 aged 54/5	United Znojmo and Olomouc. Brno joined in 1182, when he also became the first Margrave of Moravia.
Bretislaus III Henry (Břetislav III. Jindřich)	1137; Son of Henry and Margaret (?)	1193 – 15/19 June 1197	Duchy of Bohemia	Unmarried	15/19 June 1197 aged 59/60	Son of Henry, brother of King Vladislaus II. Also Bishop of Prague (1182–97).
Vladislaus III Henry (Vladislav III. Jindřich)	1137; Second son of Vladislaus II and Judith of Thuringia	22 June – 6 December 1197	Duchy of Bohemia	Heilwida no children	12 August 1222	Left no descendants. After his death, Moravia became an appanage of Bohemian princes.
Vladislaus III Henry (Vladislav III. Jindřich)	1137; Second son of Vladislaus II and Judith of Thuringia	December 1197 – 12 August 1222	Margraviate of Moravia	Heilwida no children	12 August 1222	Left no descendants. After his death, Moravia became an appanage of Bohemian princes.
Premislaus Ottokar I (Přemysl Otakar I)	1155; First son of Vladislaus II and Judith of Thuringia	1192–1193 6 December 1197 – 15 December 1230	Duchy of Bohemia (until 1198) Kingdom of Bohemia (from 1198)	Adelaide of Meissen; 1178 (annulled 1199) one child Constance of Hungary; 1199 nine children	15 December 1230; Prague aged 74/5	First king of hereditary royal title, confirmed by Frederick II, Holy Roman Emperor in 1212 by issuing the Golden Bull of Sicily.
Wenceslaus I the One-Eyed (Václav I. Jednooký)	1205; Son of Premislaus Ottokar I and Constance of Hungary	15 December 1230 – 23 September 1253	Kingdom of Bohemia	Kunigunde of Hohenstaufen; 1224 five children	23 December 1253; Králův Dvůr aged 47/8	
Premislaus Ottokar II The Iron and Golden King (Přemysl Otakar II. král železný a zlatý)	1233; Městec Králové; Son of Wenceslaus I and Kunigunde of Hohenstaufen	23 December 1253 – 26 August 1278	Kingdom of Bohemia	Margaret of Austria; 11 February 1252; Hainburg an der Donau (annulled 1261) no children Kunigunda Rostislavna of Halych; 25 October 1261; Pressburg three children	26 August 1278; Dürnkrut aged 44/5	Also Duke of Austria, Styria, Carinthia and Friuli and margrave of Carniola.
Regencies of Kunigunda Rostislavna of Halych (1278–1285) and Otto V, Margrave of Brandenburg (1278–1283)						Also Duke of Cracow (from 1291) and King of Poland (1300–1305).
Wenceslaus II (Václav II)	27 September 1271; PragueSon of Premislaus Ottokar II and Kunigunda Rostislavna of Halych	26 August 1278 – 21 June 1305	Kingdom of Bohemia	Judith of Austria; January 1285; Cheb ten children Elizabeth Richeza of Poland; 26 May 1303; Prague one child	21 June 1305; Prague aged 33	Also Duke of Cracow (from 1291) and King of Poland (1300–1305).
Wenceslaus III (Václav III)	6 October 1289; Son of Wenceslaus II and Judith of Austria	21 June 1305 – 4 August 1306	Kingdom of Bohemia	Viola of Cieszyn; 5 October 1305; Brno no children	4 August 1306; Olomouc aged 16	Uncrowned (as Bohemian king). Also King of Hungary (1301–1305) and King of Poland.
Anna (Anna Přemyslovna)	10 October 1290; Daughter of Wenceslaus II and Judith of Austria	4 August 1306 – 1306; 3/4 July 1307 – 3 December 1310	Kingdom of Bohemia	Henry; 1306 no children	3 September 1313; Olomouc aged 16	Heiresses of Bohemia, they were the true inheritors of the power claimed by their husbands during the succession crisis. Of the three, Rudolf had the weakest claim, and also the lowest popularity. The conflict was settled when, in 1310, Elizabeth and John invaded Prague, and defeated their opponents, Anna and Henry.
Henry of Carinthia (Note: VI as duke of Carinthia.) (Jindřich Korutanský)	1265; Son of Meinhard, Duke of Carinthia and Elisabeth of Bavaria	4 August 1306 – 1306; 3/4 July 1307 – 3 December 1310	Kingdom of Bohemia	Anna; 1306 no children Adelaide of Brunswick-Lüneburg; 1313 two children Beatrice of Savoy; 1327 no children	2 April 1335; Tirol aged 69/70	Heiresses of Bohemia, they were the true inheritors of the power claimed by their husbands during the succession crisis. Of the three, Rudolf had the weakest claim, and also the lowest popularity. The conflict was settled when, in 1310, Elizabeth and John invaded Prague, and defeated their opponents, Anna and Henry.
Elisabeth Richeza of Poland (Eliška-Rejčka)	1 September 1288; Poznań; Daughter of Przemysł II of Poland and Richeza of Sweden	1306 – 3/4 July 1307	Kingdom of Bohemia	Wenceslaus II; 26 May 1303; Prague one child Rudolf; 16 October 1306; Prague no children	19 October 1335; Brno aged 47	Heiresses of Bohemia, they were the true inheritors of the power claimed by their husbands during the succession crisis. Of the three, Rudolf had the weakest claim, and also the lowest popularity. The conflict was settled when, in 1310, Elizabeth and John invaded Prague, and defeated their opponents, Anna and Henry.
Rudolf of Habsburg the Good (Rudolf Habsburský, Rudolf Dobrý)	c. 1281; Vienna; Eldest son of Albert I of Germany and Elisabeth of Gorizia-Tyrol	1306 – 3/4 July 1307	Kingdom of Bohemia	Blanche of France; 25 May 1300 one child Elisabeth Richeza; 16 October 1306; Prague no children	3/4 July 1307; Horažďovice aged 26	Heiresses of Bohemia, they were the true inheritors of the power claimed by their husbands during the succession crisis. Of the three, Rudolf had the weakest claim, and also the lowest popularity. The conflict was settled when, in 1310, Elizabeth and John invaded Prague, and defeated their opponents, Anna and Henry.
Elisabeth (Eliška Přemyslovna)	20 January 1292; Prague; Daughter of Wenceslaus II and Judith of Austria	3 December 1310 – 28 September 1330	Kingdom of Bohemia	John; 1 September 1310; Prague seven children	28 September 1330; Prague aged 38	Heiresses of Bohemia, they were the true inheritors of the power claimed by their husbands during the succession crisis. Of the three, Rudolf had the weakest claim, and also the lowest popularity. The conflict was settled when, in 1310, Elizabeth and John invaded Prague, and defeated their opponents, Anna and Henry.
John of Luxembourg the Blind (Jan Lucemburský, Jan Slepý)	10 August 1296; Luxembourg; Son of Henry VII, Holy Roman Emperor and Margaret of Brabant	3 December 1310 – 26 August 1346	Kingdom of Bohemia	Elisabeth; 1 September 1310; Prague seven children Beatrice of Bourbon; December 1334; Vincennes one child	26 August 1346; Crécy-en-Ponthieu aged 50	Heiresses of Bohemia, they were the true inheritors of the power claimed by their husbands during the succession crisis. Of the three, Rudolf had the weakest claim, and also the lowest popularity. The conflict was settled when, in 1310, Elizabeth and John invaded Prague, and defeated their opponents, Anna and Henry.

== The Late Kingdom of Bohemia: from the House of Luxembourg to Austria-Hungary (1310–1918) ==
Kings of Bohemia
House of Luxembourg
John the Blind (Jan Lucemburský)	1310–1346	Son-in-law of Wenceslaus II.
Charles I (Karel I.)	1346–1378	Son of John. Also Holy Roman Emperor as Charles IV.
Wenceslaus IV (Václav IV.)	1378–1419	Son of Charles I. Also King of the Romans until 1400.
Sigismund (Zikmund)	1419–1437	Brother of Wenceslaus IV. Ruled effective 1436–1437 only (because of the Hussite Revolution). Also Holy Roman Emperor and King of Hungary.
House of Habsburg
Albert (Albrecht Habsburský)	1437–1439	Son-in-law of Sigismund. Also King of the Romans and of Hungary.
Interregnum	1440–1453	The succession of Albert's son was not recognized by the Czech nobility for most of this era; the land was administered by the Landfrieden (provincial and territorial).
Ladislaus the Posthumous (Ladislav Pohrobek)	1453–1457	Son of Albert born after his father's death. Also King of Hungary.
Non-Dynastic
George of Podebrady (Jiří z Poděbrad)	1458–1471	Elected king from the Czech noble family House of Kunštát. Although he had descendants, the succession devolved to the prince from Polish kingdom.
Matthias I (Matyáš I. Korvín)	1469–1490	King of Hungary, elected by the insurgent Catholic Czech aristocrats as anti-king in 1469, but never crowned. In 1479, he agreed to limit his rule to Moravia, Silesia, and Lusatia, while retaining his title.
House of Jagiellon
Vladislaus II the Jagiellonian (Vladislav II. Jagellonský)	1471–1516	Nephew of Ladislaus the Posthumous; elected on request of his predecessor George. Also King of Hungary after 1490.
Louis the Jagiellonian (Ludvík Jagellonský)	1516–1526	Son of Vladislaus II. Also King of Hungary.
House of Habsburg
Ferdinand I	1526–1564	Brother-in-law of Louis; elected king. Also King of Hungary and Holy Roman Emperor-elect from 1558.
Maximilian I (Maxmilián I.)	1564–1576	Son of Ferdinand I, grandson of Vladislaus II. Also King of Hungary and Holy Roman Emperor.
Rudolph II (Rudolf II.)	1576–1612	Son of Maximilian I. Also King of Hungary and Holy Roman Emperor.
Matthias II (Matyáš II.)	1612–1615	Brother of Rudolph II. Also King of Hungary and Holy Roman Emperor.
Ferdinand II	1615–1619; 1620–1637	Cousin of Matthias. Also King of Hungary and Holy Roman Emperor.
House of Wittelsbach
Frederick I (Fridrich I.)	1619–1620	Elected by the Crown's Estates at the beginning of the Thirty Years' War, but after losing the Battle of White Mountain, he fled the country.
House of Habsburg
Ferdinand III	1637–1657	Son of Ferdinand II. Also King of Hungary and Holy Roman Emperor. From this time on, Bohemia no longer had an elective monarchy, with the Habsburgs having imposed their exclusive rule at the Battle of the White Mountain.
Ferdinand IV	1646–1654	Son of Ferdinand III. Junior co-monarch during his father's reign. Also King of Hungary and King of the Romans.
Leopold I	1657–1705	Brother of Ferdinand IV. Also King of Hungary and Holy Roman Emperor.
Joseph I (Josef I.)	1705–1711	Son of Leopold I. Also King of Hungary and Holy Roman Emperor.
Charles II (Karel II.)	1711–1740	Brother of Joseph I. Also King of Hungary and Holy Roman Emperor as Charles VI.
Maria Theresa (Marie Terezie)	1740–1741; 1743–1780	Daughter of Charles II. Also Queen of Hungary.
House of Wittelsbach
Charles Albert (Karel Albrecht)	1741–1743	Son-in-law of Joseph I. Anti-king to Maria Theresa during the War of the Austrian Succession. Also Holy Roman Emperor as Charles VII.
House of Habsburg-Lorraine
Joseph II (Josef II.)	1780–1790	Son of Maria Theresa. Also King of Hungary and Holy Roman Emperor.
Leopold II	1790–1792	Brother of Joseph II. Also King of Hungary and Holy Roman Emperor.
Francis I (František I.)	1792–1835	Son of Leopold II. Also King of Hungary, Holy Roman Emperor to 1806, Emperor of Austria from 1804.
Ferdinand V	1835–1848	Son of Francis I. Also Emperor of Austria and King of Hungary. Last crowned King of Bohemia. Forced to abdicate during the Revolution of 1848.
Franz Joseph I (František Josef I.)	1848–1916	Nephew of Ferdinand V. Also Emperor of Austria and King of Hungary.
Charles III (Karel III.)	1916–1918	Grandnephew of Francis Joseph I. Also Emperor of Austria and King of Hungary. Ruled briefly during World War I; in November 1918 renounced participation in state affairs but did not abdicate.

== See also ==
- Family tree of Bohemian monarchs
- Category:Monarchs of Bohemia
- Category:Bohemian royal houses
- Category:Nobility from medieval Bohemia
- List of heads of the Czech state
- List of Bohemian royal consorts
- Coronation of the Bohemian monarch
- Bohemian crown jewels
  - Crown of Saint Wenceslas
