= Wirpirk of Tengling =

Duchess of Bohemia (1092)

Wirpirk of Tengling or Virpirka, Wilburga, Hildburga was the wife of Conrad I of Bohemia and the Duchess of Bohemia in 1092. She was the daughter of Sieghard of Tengling.

Wirpirk married Conrad in 1054. By his marriage she had two children:

- Oldřich (or Ulrich), prince of Brno from 1092 to 1097 and from 1100 to his death on 11 November 1113
- Luitpold, prince of Znojmo from 1092 to 1097 and from 1100 to his death on 15 March 1113.

Conrad came to power over Moravia gradually. King Vratislaus II of Bohemia naturally did not like it and besieged Brno in 1091. But it came to rebellion in the royal army, led by King's son Břetislaus. Wirpirk, reputedly on her own initiative, went to Vratislaus camp and asked for quarter for her husband and nephew.

In the end Vratislaus agreed that Conrad will be his heir (but Conrad ruled just only for a very short time due to his sudden death).

== Literature ==
- Jaroslav Čechura, Jiří Mikulec, František Stellner. Lexikon českých panovnických dynastií. Praha, 1996, p. 95.

Wirpirk of Tengling
Royal titles
Preceded by Świętosława of Poland	Duchess consort of Bohemia; 1092	Succeeded by Lukarta of Bogen
