= Chožov =

- Municipality
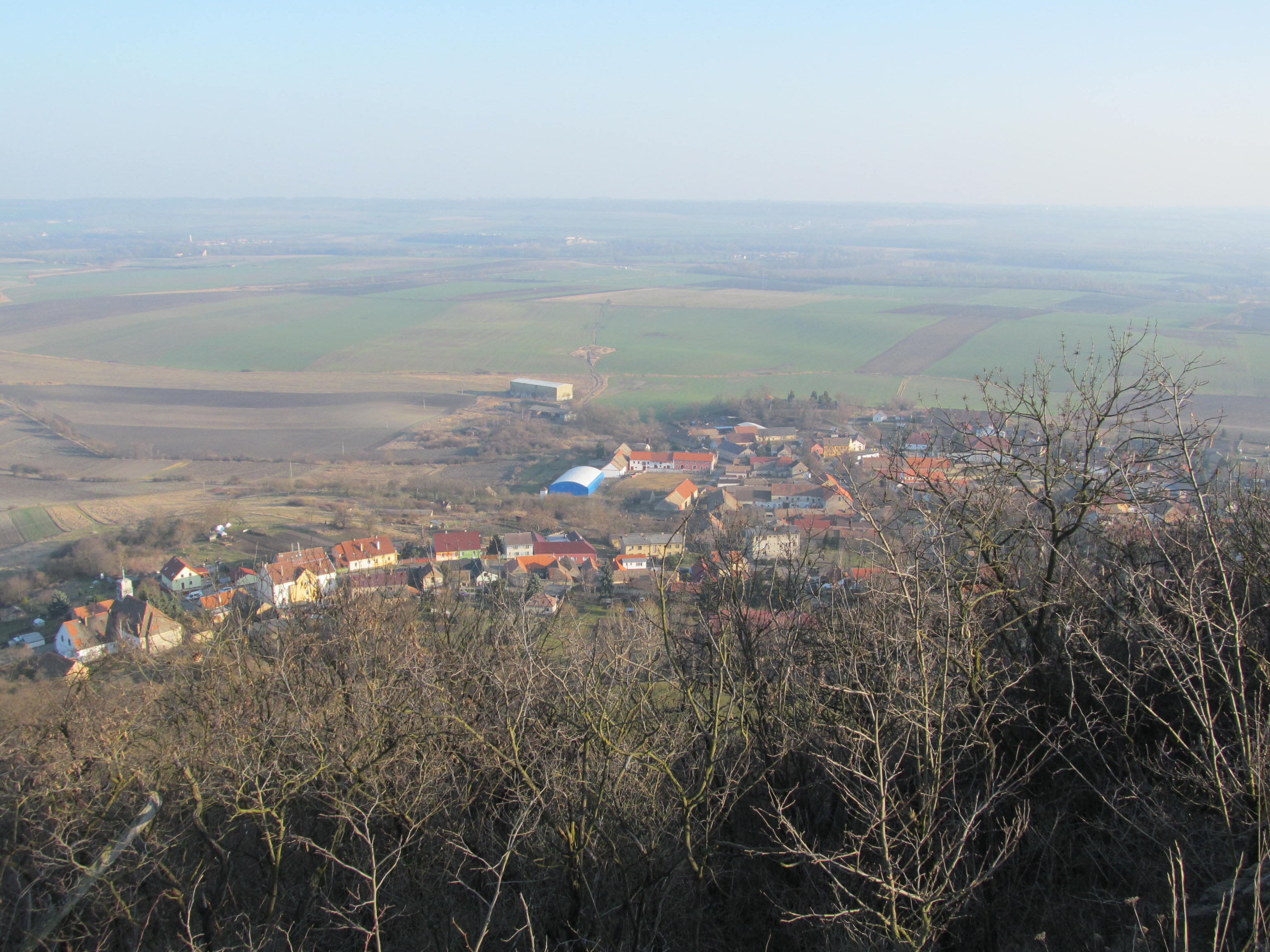
- View from the northwest

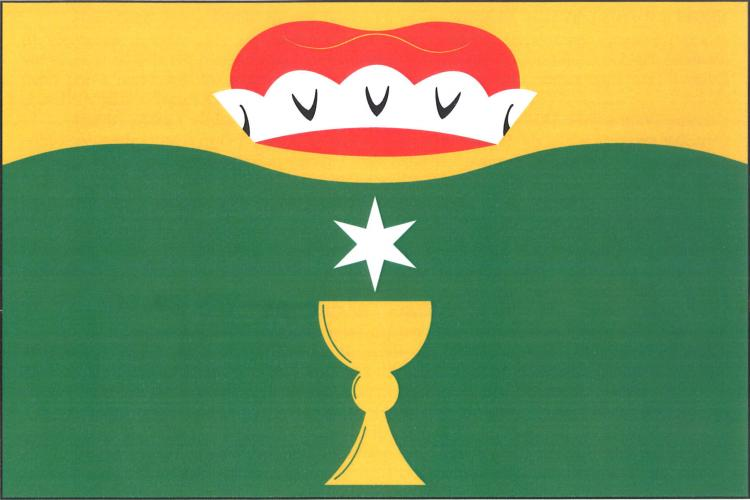
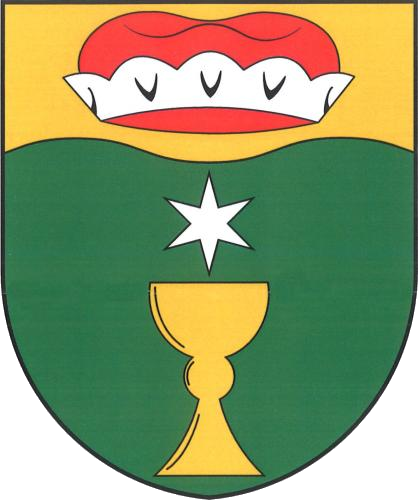
- Flag Coat of arms

- Location in the Czech Republic
- Coordinates: 50°23′56″N 13°51′33″E
- Country: Czech Republic
- Region: Ústí nad Labem
- District: Louny
- First mentioned: 1057

Area
  - Total: 21.28 km^{2} (8.22 sq mi)
- Elevation: 225 m (738 ft)

Population (2026-01-01)
  - Total: 563
  - Density: 26.5/km^{2} (68.5/sq mi)
- Time zone: UTC+1 (CET)
  - Summer (DST): UTC+2 (CEST)
- Postal codes: 439 22, 440 01
- Website: www.chozov.cz

Chožov (German: Koschow) is a municipality and village in Louny District in the Ústí nad Labem Region of the Czech Republic. It has about 600 inhabitants.

== Administrative division ==
Chožov consists of three municipal parts (in brackets population according to the 2021 census):

- Chožov (281)
- Mnichovský Týnec (97)
- Třtěno (139)

== Etymology ==
The initial name of the village was Chodžov. The name was derived from the personal name Chodiš or Chodeš, meaning "Chodiš's/Chodeš's (court)". From 1854, the name Chožov is used.

== Geography ==
Chožov is located about 6 kilometres (4 mi) northeast of Louny and 32 km (20 mi) southwest of Ústí nad Labem. It lies on the border between the Central Bohemian Uplands and Lower Ohře Table. The highest point is at 388 m (1,273 ft) above sea level. The northwestern half of the municipality is situated in the České středohoří Protected Landscape Area.

== History ==
The first written mention of Chožov is from 1057, when Duke Spytihněv II donated the village to the Litoměřice Chapter.

== Demographics ==
Historical population

Year	Pop.	±%
1869	1,216	—
1880	1,389	+14.2%
1890	1,321	−4.9%
1900	1,369	+3.6%
1910	1,335	−2.5%

Year	Pop.	±%
1921	1,296	−2.9%
1930	1,290	−0.5%
1950	899	−30.3%
1961	819	−8.9%
1970	741	−9.5%

Year	Pop.	±%
1980	591	−20.2%
1991	513	−13.2%
2001	559	+9.0%
2011	556	−0.5%
2021	517	−7.0%

Source: Censuses

== Transport ==
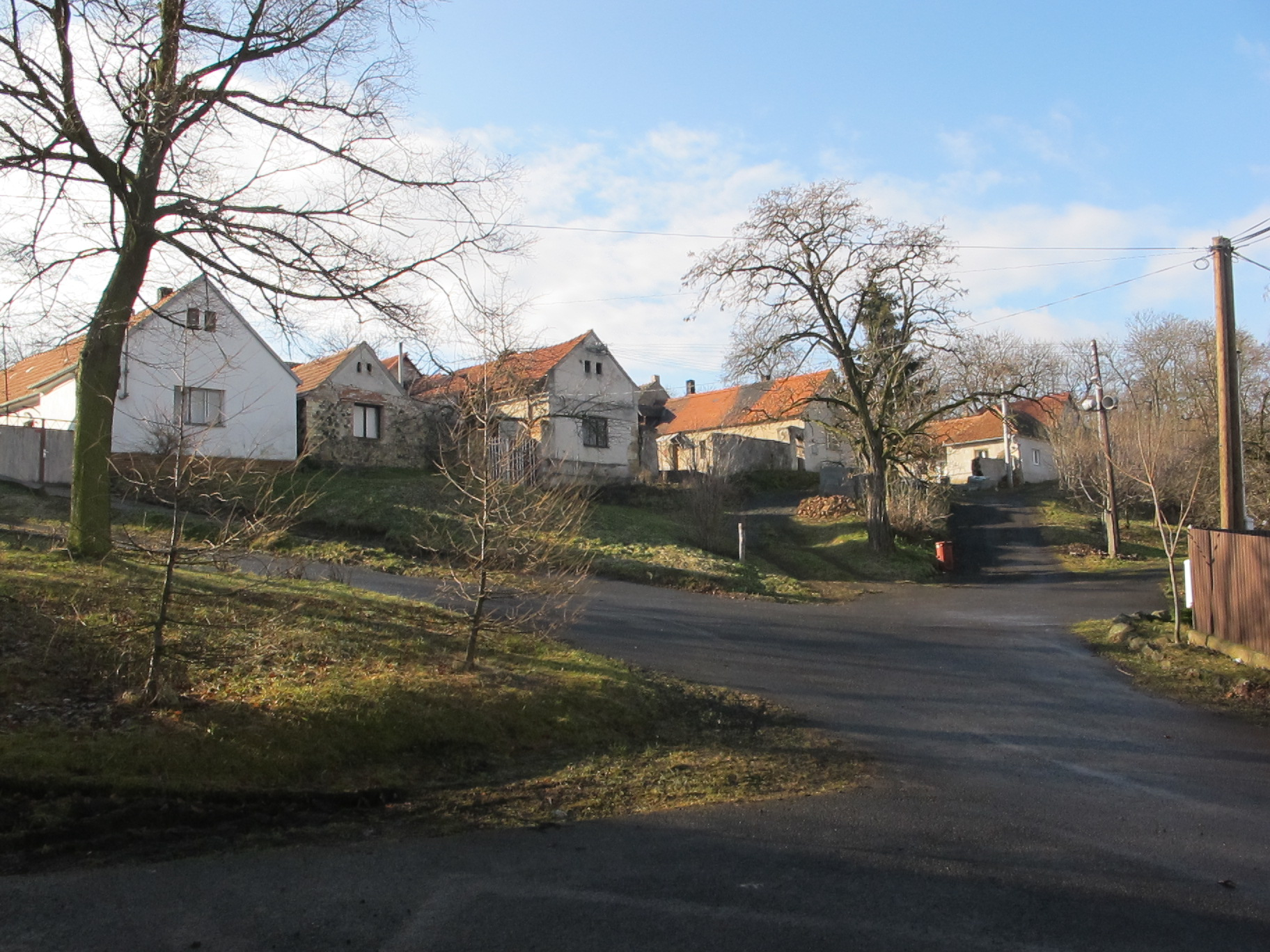
The village of Mnichovský Týnec

There are no railways or major roads passing through the municipality.

== Sights ==
The main landmark is the prayer house of the Czechoslovak Hussite Church with the rectory, built in the Historicist style in 1924. It is one of the earliest buildings of this church and still serves its original purpose.
