= Bořivoj II, Duke of Bohemia =

Bořivoj II
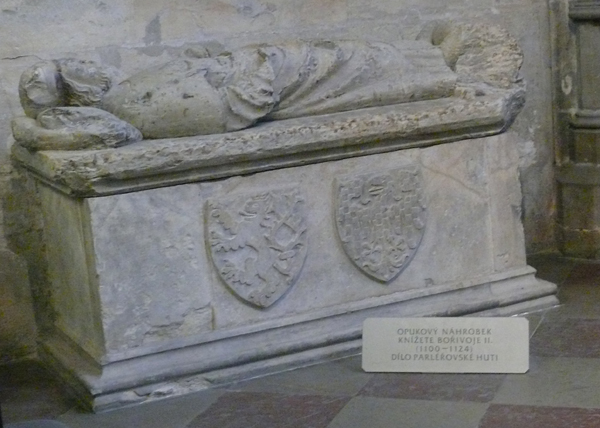

Duke of Bohemia
- Reign: 25 December 1100 – May 1107
- Predecessor: Bretislaus II
- Successor: Svatopluk

Duke of Bohemia
- Reign: December 1117 – 16 August 1120
- Predecessor: Vladislaus I
- Successor: Vladislaus I
- Born: c. 1064; Prague
- Died: 2 February 1124 (aged c. 60); Hungary
- Spouse: Helbirga of Austria
- Issue: Jaromír, Spitignev, Lupold, Boleslav, Albrecht, Richza
- Dynasty: Přemyslid
- Father: Vratislav II of Bohemia
- Mother: Świętosława of Poland

Bořivoj II (c. 1064 – 2 February 1124) was the duke of Bohemia from 25 December 1100 until May 1107 and from December 1117 until 16 August 1120. He was the younger half-brother and successor of Bretislaus II. His father was Vratislav II of Bohemia, his mother Świętosława of Poland.

== Life ==
He was originally opposed by Duke Ulrich I of Brno, his cousin, who had recovered the stronghold originally confiscated from his father. A civil war ensued. Oldřich intended to recognise the suzerainty of Emperor Henry IV, and thereby gain his support, but Bořivoj had already been confirmed by the emperor. Oldřich was eventually forced to flee to Moravia.

In 1102, Ladislaus I Herman, Duke of Poland, died. A quarrel broke out in Poland over the succession, with Bořivoj and his cousin Svatopluk supporting Zbigniew against Bolesław III Wrymouth. Bolesław, however, paid Bořivoj off and the latter withdrew from the conflict. Svatopluk, furious, defected and led a number of Bohemian grandees with him. He sought to induce Coloman of Hungary to go to war with Bořivoj, but was unsuccessful until 1107. In that year, Bořivoj's younger brother Vladislaus rebelled and, with Coloman's help, took Prague. Svatopluk, who had recently captured and been forced to release Bořivoj by Emperor Henry V, was proclaimed king.

Bořivoj attacked in 1108 with the aid of Bolesław in alliance with Coloman, whom Svatopluk and Henry were jointly attacking in Hungary. Svatopluk was recalled to fight him off and soon the emperor was invading Poland. Svatopluk was murdered on this campaign by supporters of Bořivoj, but he could not regain the throne, which went to Vladislaus. In 1117, the brothers were reconciled and they ruled the duchy jointly (though divided) until 1120, when a new disagreement led Bořivoj to self-exile in Hungary, where he died on 2 February 1124.

== Marriage ==
He was married to Gerberga, daughter of Leopold II, Margrave of Austria. Their children are:

- Jaromir, +by 1135;
- Spitignev, +3.1.1157
- Lupold, fl 1143
- Boleslav, fl 1146
- Albrecht, +7.4. before 1124
- Richza, +27.2. before 1124

Preceded by Bretislaus II	Duke of Bohemia; 1100–1107	Succeeded by Svatopluk
Preceded by Vladislaus I	Duke of Bohemia; 1117–1120	Succeeded by Vladislaus I
