= Břetislav's decree =

Set of 1039 Czech legal regulations

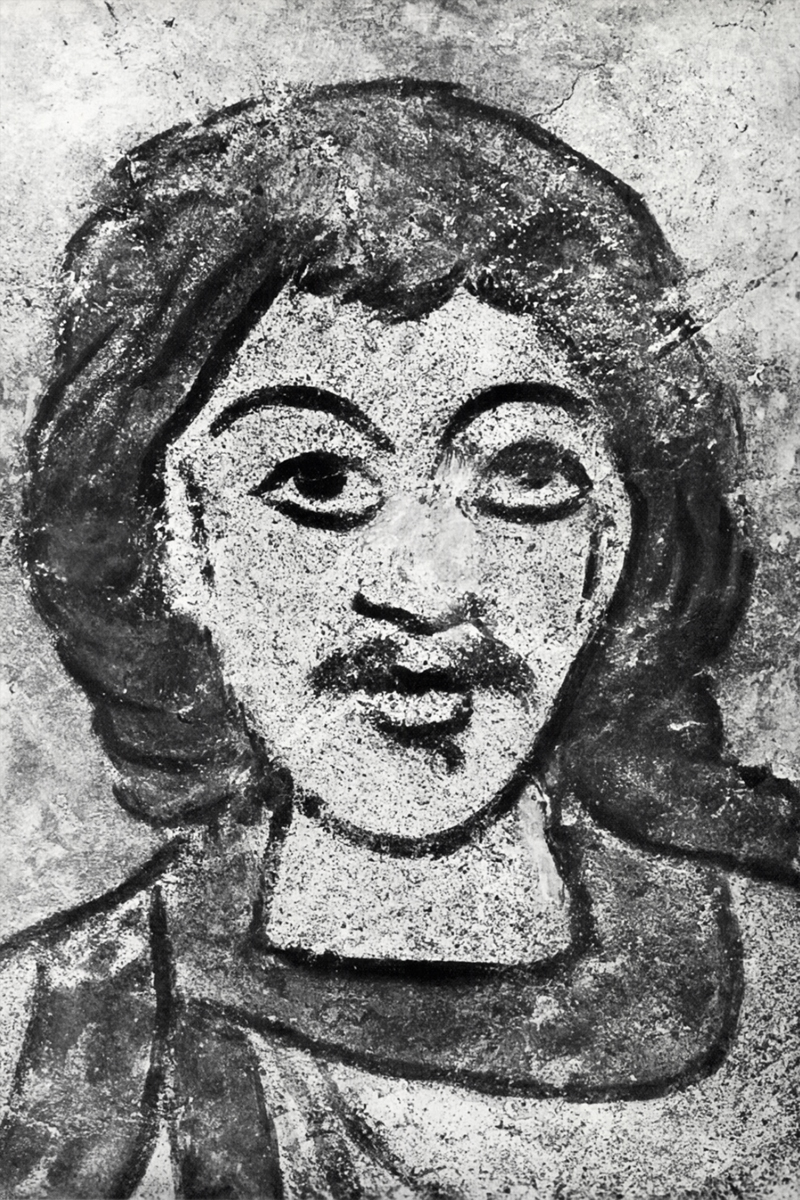
Prince Břetislav I.

Břetislav's Decree (also known as the Hnězden Decree) is a set of legal regulations promulgated in 1039 by the Czech Prince Břetislav I over the grave of St.Vojtěch in Hnězden. It is the oldest Czech legal document (apart from the Old Slavonic code of law Zákon sudnyj ljudem) and an important historical source that provides significant information about early medieval society, which was still only partially Christianised. The basic ideas of this code were already promoted by St. Vojtěch and he was ostracized by Czech society for this, as is eloquently demonstrated not only by the legends of St. Vojtěch. In order to emphasize the validity of the decree by a higher power, Břetislav I alienated the saint's relics in Hnězdno, as well as those of his brother, Archbishop St. Radim, and transported them to Prague with great glory.

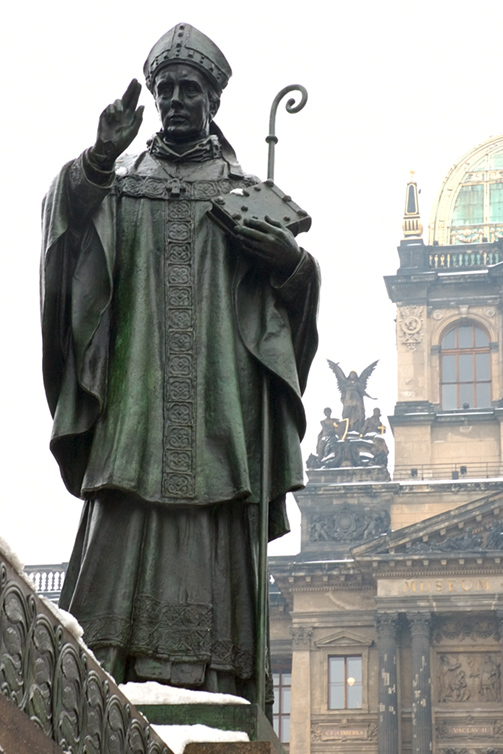
St. Vojtěch statue in Prague

The decree was aimed at eliminating all pagan customs in the country that had survived among the Christian population from pagan times. Therefore, according to these decrees, a strict action was taken against all pagan customs among the people, against pagan beliefs, superstitions, and sorceries, which, in spite of all persecutions and punishments, were still mingling with the Christian faith.

Břetislav's decree also listed among the transgressions, for example, when a man forsook his wife from him and replaced her with another woman, illegitimate motherhood, non-sanctification of Sundays and feasts, and others. The punishments for such transgressions varied widely and were often very severe, such as the sale of the entire family into foreign slavery, expulsion from the country, confiscation of all property, corporal punishment such as flogging, fines, and many other cruel punishments.

If the accused denied guilt and there were no witnesses to prove the crime, evidence was resorted to by means of divine courts or ordinals, which were very common in the 11th century.

According to the Czech historian and archaeologist Jiří Sláma, the decrees were intended to strengthen the princely power and their promulgation was related to the internal economic needs of the Czech state. The formulation of individual decrees was influenced by contemporary codes. They were probably (however, any evidence is lacking) promulgated at the beginning of Břetislav's reign (i.e. after 1034) and only later the chronicler Kosmas connected their promulgation with Břetislav's Polish campaign.

== Literature ==
- Velké dějiny zemí Koruny české I. Do roku 1197. Paseka. 1999. ISBN 80-7185-265-1.
- Břetislav I. Čechy a střední Evropa v prvé polovině XI. století (2 ed.). Garamond. 1999. ISBN 80-901760-7-0.
- Po stopách prvních Přemyslovců III. Správa a obrana země (1012-1055). Od Oldřicha po Břetislava I. Libri. 2006. ISBN 978-80-7277-365-7.
- České dějiny I./II. Od Břetislava I. do Přemysla I. Jan Laichter.
- Čechy v době knížecí 1034–1198. Nakladatelství Lidové noviny. 2007. ISBN 978-80-7106-905-8.
