= History of Moravia =

Coat of Arms of Moravia

The history of Moravia, one of the Czech lands, is diverse and characterized by many periods of foreign governance.

== Pre-history ==
Early modern humans had settled in the region by the Paleolithic. The Předmostí archaeological site in Moravia is dated to between 24,000 and 27,000 years old.

== Ancient Moravia ==
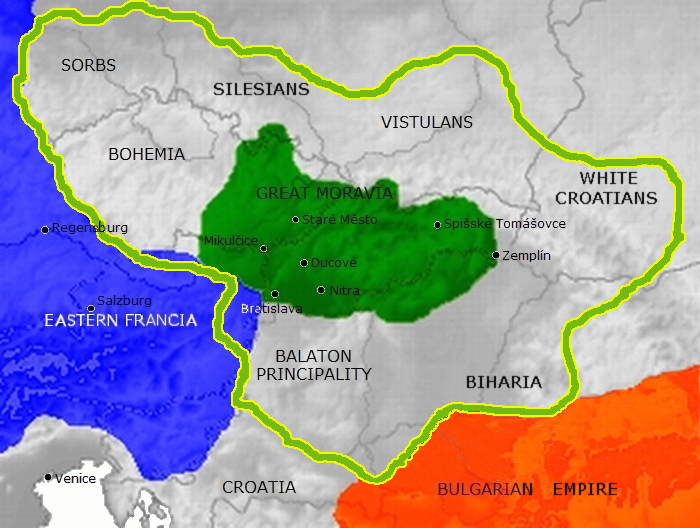
Territory of Great Moravia in the 9th century: area ruled by Rastislav (846–870) in green; the green line marks the greatest territorial extent during the reign of Svatopluk I (871–894)

Around 60 BC the Celtic Volcae people withdrew from the region and were succeeded in turn by the Germanic Quadi. Several hundred years later, in the 6th century AD the Slavic tribes arrived in this territory often crossed during the Migration Period by successive Germanic and major Slavic tribes. At the end of the 8th century the Moravian Principality came into being in present-day south-eastern Moravia, Záhorie in south-western Slovakia and parts of Lower Austria. In 833 AD, this became the state of Great Moravia with the conquest of the Principality of Nitra (present-day Slovakia). Their first king was Mojmír I (ruled 830–846). Louis the German invaded Moravia and replaced Mojmír I with his nephew Rastiz who became St. Rastislav. St. Rastislav (846–870) tried to emancipate his land from the Carolingian influence, so he sent envoys to Rome to get missionaries to come. When Rome refused he turned to Constantinople to the Byzantine emperor Michael. The result was the mission of Saints Cyril and Methodius who translated liturgical books into Slavonic, which had lately been elevated by the Pope to the same level as Latin and Greek. Methodius became the first Moravian archbishop, but after his death the German influence again prevailed and the disciples of Methodius were forced to flee. So the unique situation which anticipated the II Vatican Council by several centuries was destroyed. Great Moravia reached its greatest territorial extent in the 890s under Svatopluk I. At this time, the empire encompassed the territory of the present-day Czech Republic and Slovakia, the western part of present Hungary (Pannonia), as well as Lusatia in present-day Germany and Silesia and the upper Vistula basin in southern Poland. After Svatopluk's death in 895, the Bohemian princes defected to become vassals of the East Frankish ruler Arnulf of Carinthia, and the Moravian state ceased to exist after being overrun by invading Magyars in 906/7.

== Union with Bohemia ==
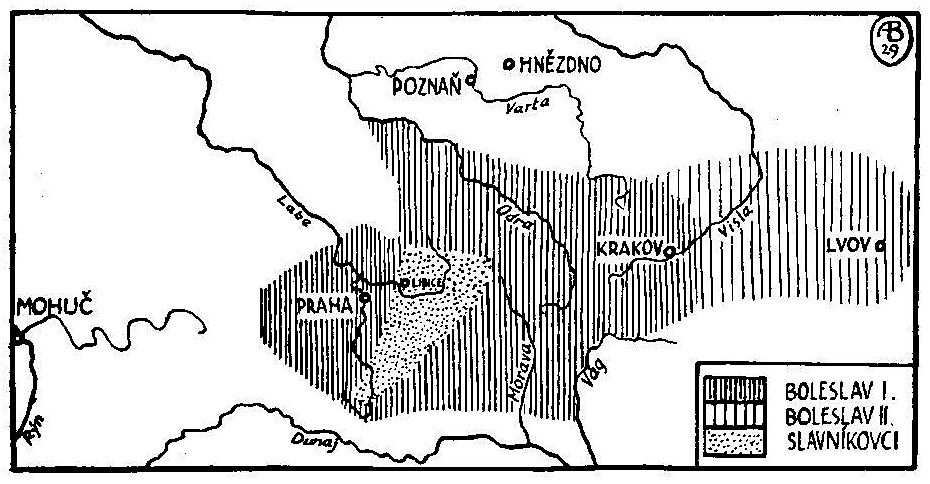
Bohemian state in the 10th century

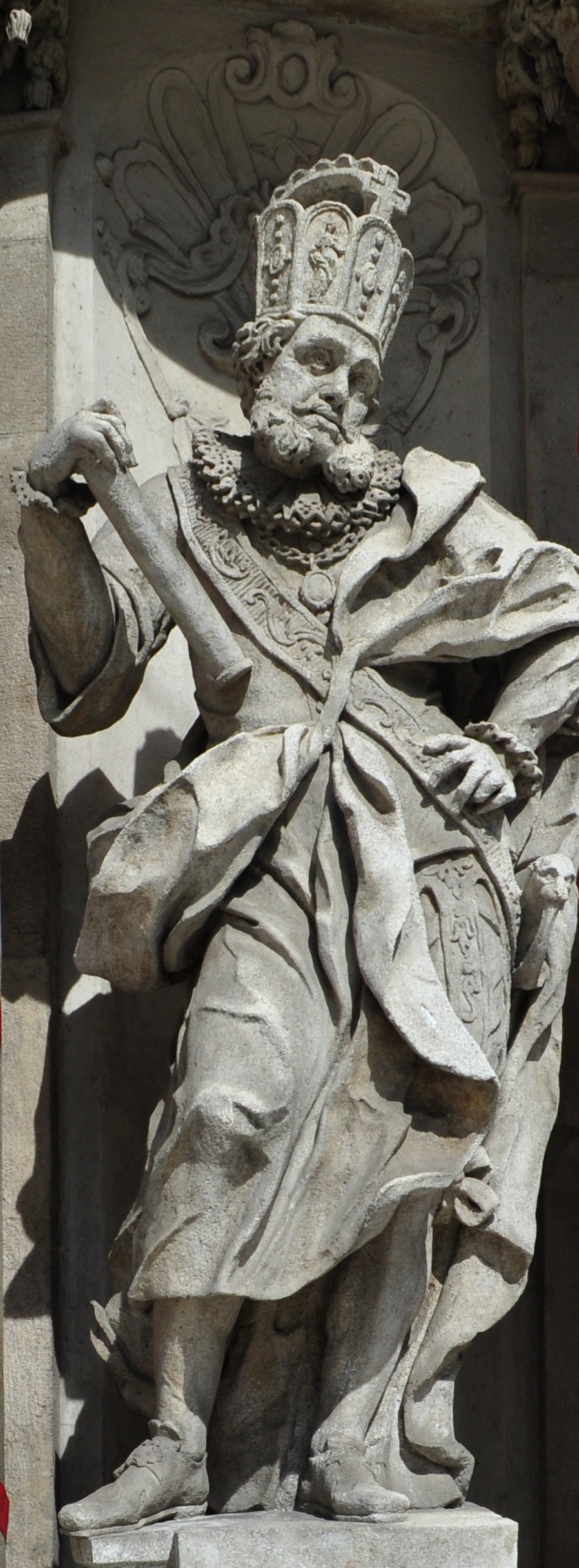
Jobst of Moravia, Margrave of Moravia and King of the Romans. Josef Leonard Weber, ca 1748

Following the defeat of the Magyars by Emperor Otto I at the Battle of Lechfeld in 955, Otto's ally Boleslaus I, the Přemyslid ruler of Bohemia, received Moravia. Bolesław I Chrobry of Poland annexed Moravia in 999, and ruled it until 1019, when the Přemyslid prince Bretislaus recaptured it. Since then, Moravia has shared its history with Bohemia. Upon his father's death in 1034, Bretislaus also became the ruler of Bohemia. In 1055, Bretislaus decreed that the Bohemia and Moravia would be inherited together by primogeniture, although he also provided that his younger sons should govern parts (quarters) of Moravia as vassals to his oldest son.

Throughout the Přemyslid era, junior princes often ruled all or part of Moravia from Olomouc, Brno or Znojmo, with varying degrees of autonomy from the ruler of Bohemia. (Mainly Dukes of Olomouc usually used to act as "right hand" of Prague dukes and kings. Dukes of Brno and especially those of Znojmo were much more insubordinate.) Moravia reached its height of autonomy in 1182, when Emperor Frederick I elevated Conrad II Otto of Znojmo to the status of a margrave, immediately subject to the emperor, independent of Bohemia. This status was short-lived: in 1186, Conrad Otto was forced to obey the supreme rule of Bohemian duke Frederick. Three years later, Conrad Otto succeed to Frederick as Duke of Bohemia and subsequently canceled his margrave title. Nevertheless, the margrave title was restored in 1197 when Vladislaus III, Duke of Bohemia resolved the succession dispute between him and his brother Ottokar by abdicating from the Bohemian throne and accepting Moravia as a vassal land of Bohemian (i.e., Prague) rulers. Vladislaus gradually established this land as Margraviate, slightly administratively different from Bohemia.

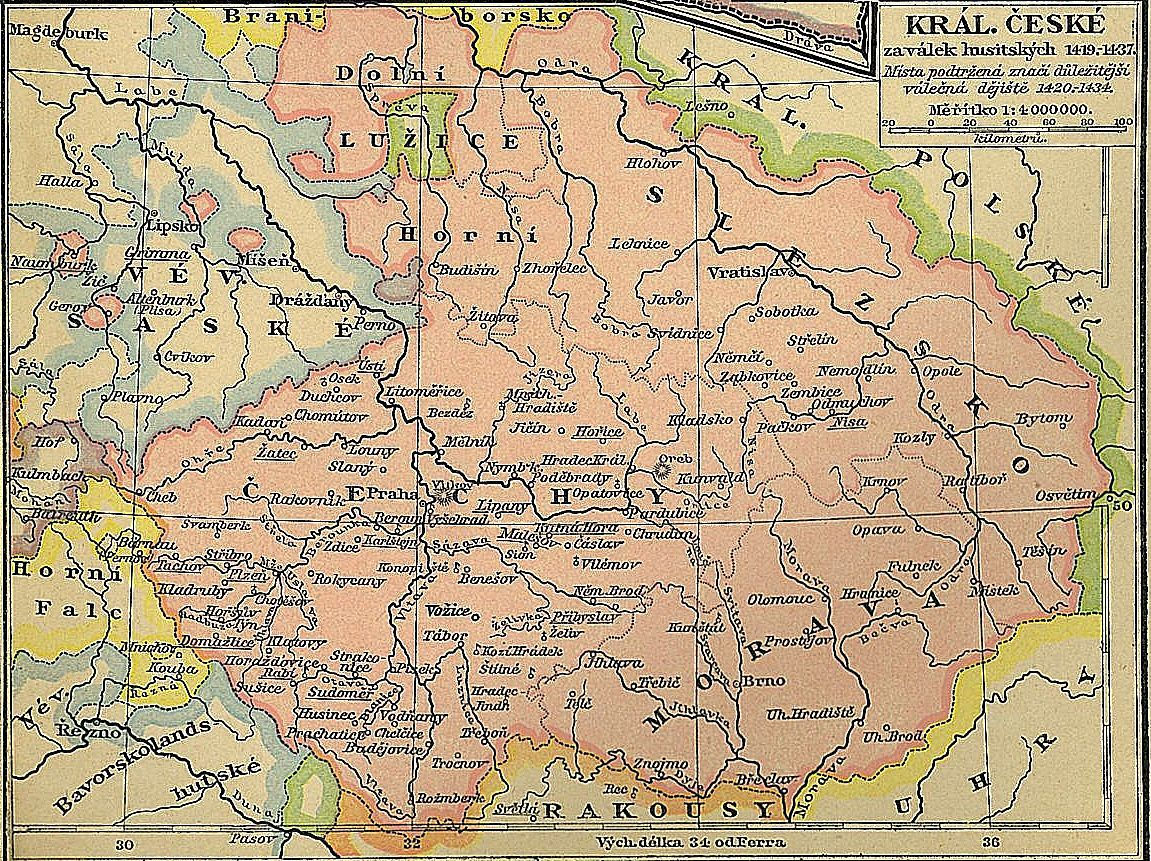
Kingdom of Bohemia and adjacent lands during the Hussite Wars

The main line of the Přemyslid dynasty became extinct in 1306, and in 1310 John of Luxembourg became Margrave of Moravia and King of Bohemia. In 1333, he made his son Charles the next Margrave of Moravia (later in 1346, Charles become also the King of Bohemia). In 1349, Charles gave Moravia to his younger brother John Henry who ruled in the margraviate until his death in 1375, after him Moravia was ruled by his oldest son Jobst of Moravia who was in 1410 elected the Holy Roman King but died in 1411 (at present day, he is buried with his father in the Church of St. Thomas in Brno – the Moravian capital which they both ruled from). Moravia and Bohemia remained within the Luxembourg dynasty of Holy Roman kings and emperors (except during the Hussite Wars), until inherited by Albert II of Habsburg in 1437.

After his death followed the interregnum until 1453; land (as the rest of lands of the Bohemian Crown) was administered by the landfriedens (landfrýdy). The rule of young Ladislaus the Posthumous subsisted only less than five years and subsequently (1458) the Hussite George of Poděbrady was elected as the king. He again reunited all Czech lands (then Bohemia, Moravia, Silesia, Upper & Lower Lusatia) into one-man ruled state. In 1466, Pope Paul II excommunicated George and forbade all Catholics (i.e. c. 15% of population) from continuing to serve him. The Hungarian crusade followed and in 1469 Matthias Corvinus conquered Moravia and proclaimed himself (with assistance of rebelling Bohemian nobility) as the king of Bohemia.

The subsequent 21-year period of a divided kingdom was decisive for the rising awareness of a specific Moravian identity, distinct from that of Bohemia. Although Moravia was reunited with Bohemia in 1490 when Vladislaus Jagiellon, king of Bohemia, also became king of Hungary, some attachment to Moravian "freedoms" and resistance to government by Prague continued until the end of independence in 1620. In 1526, Vladislaus' son Louis died in battle and the Habsburg Ferdinand I was elected as his successor.

== Habsburg rule (1526–1918) ==
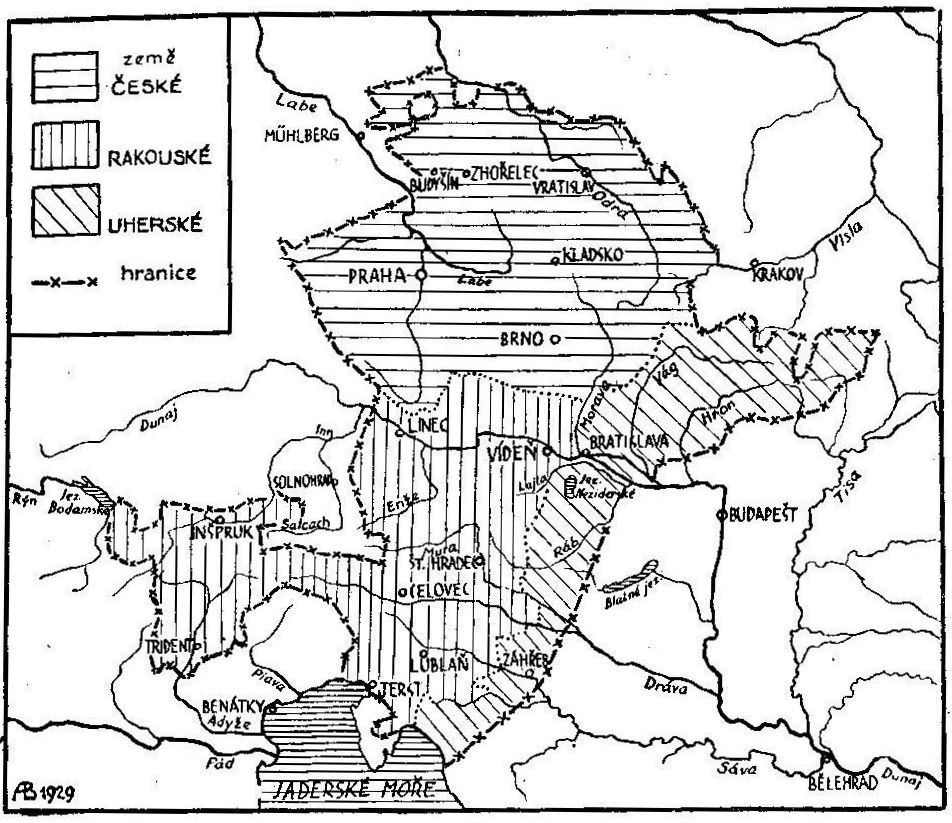
Lands of the Czech Crown (together with the Lands of the St Stephen Crown and the Austrian Hereditary Lands) within the Habsburg Empire

The epoch 1526–1620 was marked by increasing animosity between Catholic Habsburg kings (emperors) and the Protestant Moravian nobility (and other Crowns') estates. Moravia, like Bohemia, was a Habsburg possession until the end of World War I. In 1573 the Jesuit University of Olomouc was established; this was first university in Moravia. The establishment of a special papal seminary, Collegium Nordicum, made the university a centre of the Catholic Reformation and effort to revive Catholicism in Central and Northern Europe. The second largest group of students were from Scandinavia.

From 1599 to 1711, Moravia was frequently subjected to raids by the Ottoman Empire and its vassals (especially the Tatars and Transylvania). Overall, hundreds of thousands were enslaved whilst tens of thousands were killed.

Until 1641 Moravia's capitals were Brno and Olomouc, but after the capture of Olomouc by the Swedes, the city of Brno become the sole capital (Brno was the only city in Moravia which successfully resisted the invaders). The Margraviate of Moravia had (from 1348 in Olomouc and Brno) its own Diet (parliament) – zemský sněm (Landtag in German), whose deputies from 1905 onward were elected separately from the ethnically separate German and Czech constituencies.

In 17th century Moravia, today's oldest theatre building in Central Europe was founded – Reduta Theatre. In 1740, Moravia was invaded by Prussian forces under Frederick the Great, and Olomouc was forced to surrender on 27 December 1741. A few months later the Prussians were repelled, mainly because of their unsuccessful siege of Brno in 1742. In 1758, Olomouc was besieged by Prussians again but this time, defenders of Olomouc forced the Prussians to withdraw following the Battle of Domstadtl. In 1777, a new Moravian bishopric was established in Brno, and the Olomouc bishopric was raised to archbishopric. In 1782, the Margaviate of Moravia was merged with the Austrian Silesia into the Moravia-Silesia, with Brno as its capital city. This lasted until 1850.

== 20th century ==
Following the break-up of the Austro-Hungarian Empire in 1918, Moravia became part of Czechoslovakia. As one of the five lands of Czechoslovakia, it had restricted autonomy. In 1928 Moravia ceased to exist as a territorial unity and was merged with Czech Silesia into the Moravian–Silesian Land. After the German occupation of Czechoslovakia in World War II, Moravia was divided – part was made an administrative unit within the Protectorate of Bohemia and Moravia and the area with more ethnic Germans was absorbed by the German Third Reich.

In 1945 after the end of World War II and Allied defeat of Germany, Czechoslovakia, expelled the ethnic German minority of Moravia to Germany and Austria. The Moravian–Silesian Land was restored with Moravia as part of it. In 1949 the territorial division of Czechoslovakia was radically changed, as the Moravian-Silesian Land was abolished and Lands were replaced by kraje (regions), whose borders substantially differ from the historical Bohemian-Moravian border, so Moravia politically ceased to exist after approx. 1116 years (833–1949) of its history.

After the fall of the Soviet Union, the Czechoslovak Federal Assembly condemned the cancellation of Moravian–Silesian land and expressed "firm conviction that this injustice will be corrected" in 1990, however after the breakup of Czechoslovakia into Czech Republic and Slovakia in 1993, Moravian land remained in the Czech territory, and the latest administrative division of Czech Republic (which was introduced in 2000) is nearly identical with the administrative division of 1949.

== Gallery ==
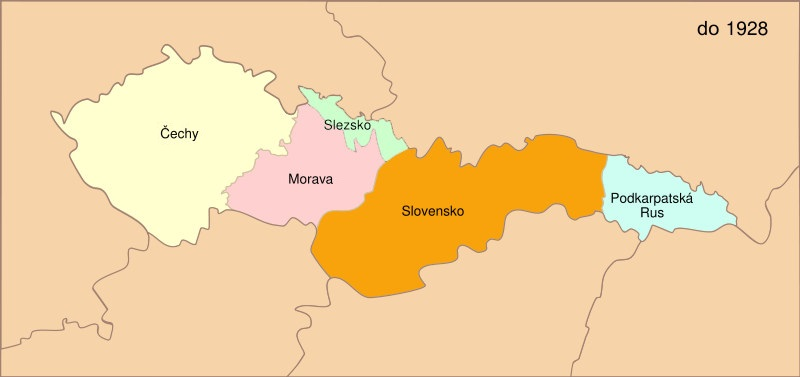
Moravia within Czechoslovakia between 1918–1928

Moravia as part of Moravia-Silesia within Czechoslovakia between 1928–1938

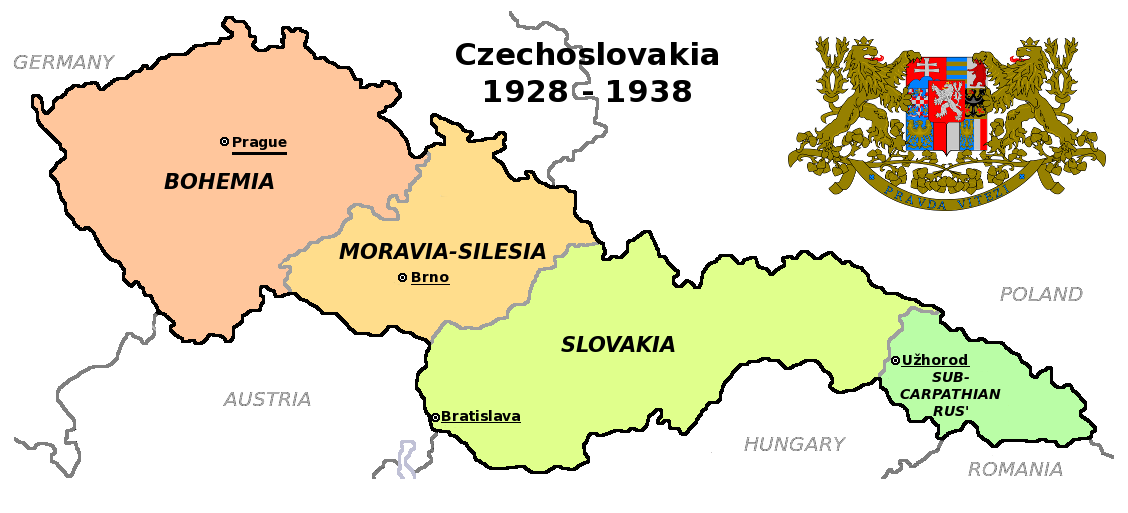
Moravia-Silesia within Czechoslovakia between 1928–1938

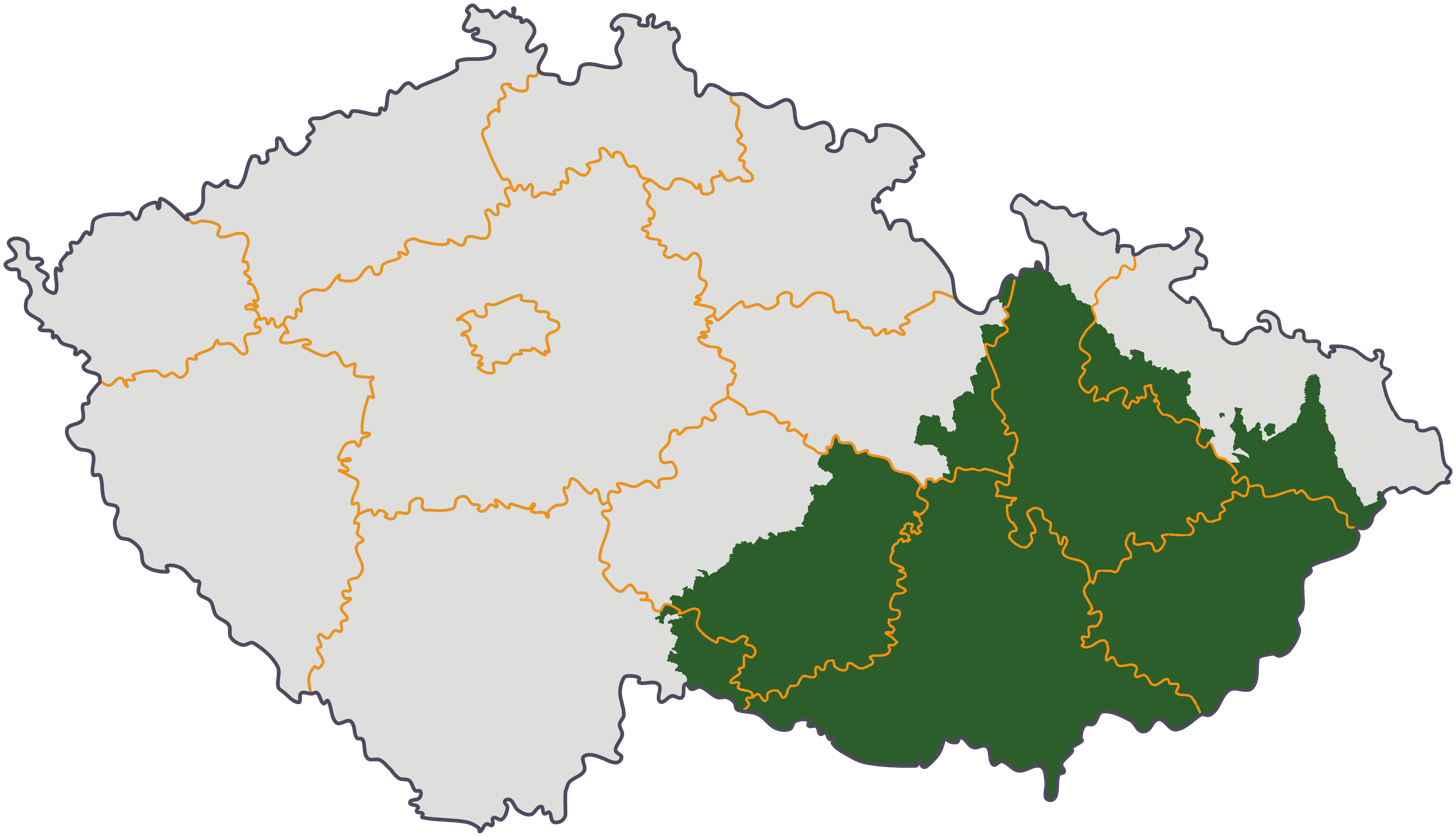
Moravia in the Czech Republic

== Sources ==
- Semple, Ellen Churchill. "The Barrier Boundary of the Mediterranean Basin and Its Northern Breaches as Factors in History." Annals of the Association of American Geographers, Vol. 5. (1915), pp 27–59.
