= Lukarta of Bogen =

Duchess consort of Bohemia from 1094 to 1100

Lukarta of Bogen (born c. 1075) was a Duchess consort of Bohemia, married to Bretislaus II, Duke of Bohemia.

In the month of September of the same year, Prince Bohemia took a lady as his wife from Bavaria named Lukarda, the sister of Count Albrecht...
— Cosmas of Prague

The marriage took place in 1094 and had political significance. Břetislav and Lukarta had a son Břetislav, born on 30 June, probably in 1095.

Royal titles
Preceded by Wirpirk of Tengling	Duchess consort of Bohemia; 1094–1100	Succeeded by Helbirga of Austria
