= Conrad I of Bohemia =

Duke of Bohemia in 1092

Conrad I
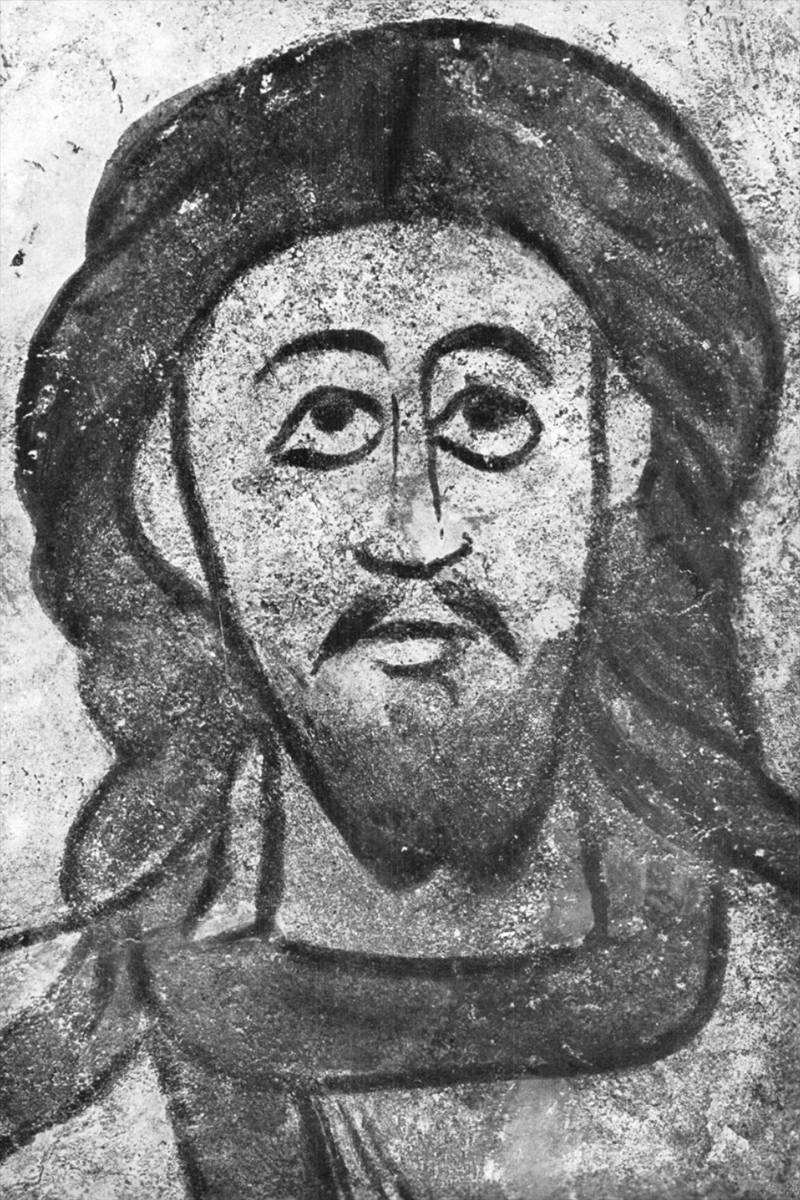

Duke of Bohemia
- Reign: January – 6 September 1092
- Predecessor: Vratislaus II
- Successor: Bretislaus II
- Born: c. 1035
- Died: 6 September 1092 (aged c. 57)
- Spouse: Wirpirk of Tengling
- Issue: Ulrich, Luitpold
- Dynasty: Přemyslid
- Father: Bretislaus I
- Mother: Judith of Schweinfurt

Conrad I of Brno (Czech: Konrád I. Brněnský; died 6 September 1092) was the duke of Bohemia for eight months in 1092.

== Life ==
He was the brother and successor of Vratislaus II (died 14 January 1092) as the third son of Bretislaus I and Judith of Schweinfurt. He did not succeed as king, because his brother had only been elevated to the royal dignity for life by the Emperor Henry IV without the establishment of a hereditary monarchy.

Before he became duke of Bohemia, he had long ruled over southern parts of Moravia, as junior sons typically did in this period of Bohemia, as duke of Brno and Znojmo from 1054.

== Marriage ==
By his marriage to Wirpirk of Tengling, he had two children:

- Ulrich, prince of Brno from 1092 to 1097 and from 1100 to his death on 11 November 1113
- Luitpold, prince of Znojmo from 1092 to 1097 and from 1100 to his death on 15 March 1112

He was succeeded as duke by his nephew Bretislaus.

Preceded by Vratislaus II	Duke of Bohemia; 1092	Succeeded by Bretislaus II
