= Bretislav II =

Duke of Bohemia from 1092 to 1100

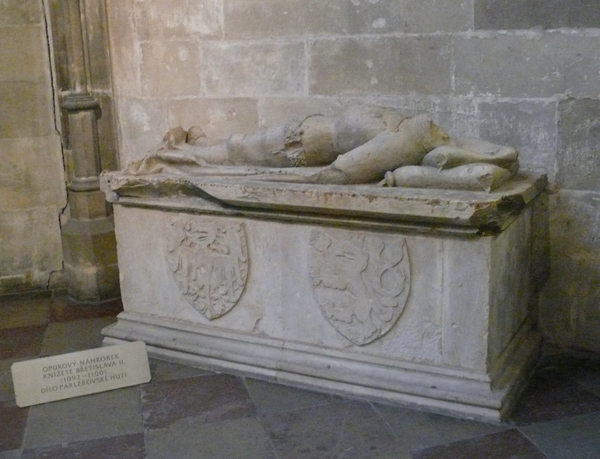

Duke of Bohemia
- Reign: September 1092 – 22 December 1100
- Predecessor: Conrad I
- Successor: Bořivoj II
- Born: c. 1060
- Died: 22 December 1100 (aged c. 40)
- Spouse: Luitgard of Windberg
- Issue: Bretislaus
- Dynasty: Přemyslid
- Father: Vratislaus II of Bohemia
- Mother: Adelaide of Hungary

Bretislaus II (Czech: Břetislav II.; c. 1060 – 22 December 1100) was the duke of Bohemia from 14 September 1092 until his death in 1100. He was the eldest son of King Vratislaus II and Adelaide, daughter of Andrew I of Hungary. He was a major enemy of paganism.

== Life ==
He succeeded his uncle Conrad I and worked for the destruction of the old Slavic culture. In 1097, he expelled the Slavonic monks of the monastery in Sazava founded in 1033 by Procopius. Bretislaus also wished to end the elective principle of succession and replace it with a type of seniorate as conceptualised by Bretislaus I: the eldest prince of the reigning family would hold Bohemia as sovereign over the entire state while the younger scions of the dynasty would rule as territorial dukes over the regions of Moravia. This was to the benefit of his half-brother Bořivoj II. He invested Bořivoj as duke of Brno in 1097, thus removing the sons of Conrad I from the succession. Bretislaus also succeeded in receiving a long-desired imperial investiture at the Diet of Regensburg on 19 April 1099. Bretislaus was assassinated by his adversaries at the hunting lodge of Zbecno in western Bohemia on 22 December 1100.

== Marriage ==
In 1094 Bretislaus married Luitgard of Windberg, with whom he had one son: Bretislaus, who rebelled against Soběslav I and was killed on 8 March 1130.

== Sources ==
- Sommer, Petr (2009). Přemyslovci. Budování českého státu. Prague: Nakladatelství Lidové noviny. p. 779. ISBN 978-80-7106-352-0.

Preceded by Conrad I	Duke of Bohemia; 1092–1100	Succeeded by Bořivoj II
