= Vratislaus II of Bohemia =

Duke of Bohemia from 1061 to 1085

Vratislaus II
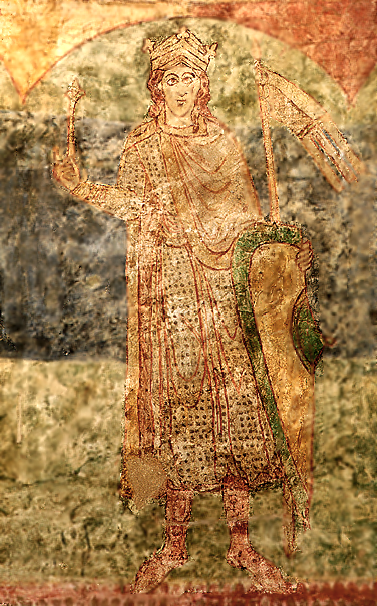

Duke of Bohemia
- Reign: January 1061 – June 1085
- Predecessor: Spytihněv II of Bohemia
- Successor: himself as king

King of Bohemia
- Reign: June 1085 – 14 January 1092
- Coronation: 15 June 1085, Prague
- Predecessor: himself as duke
- Successor: Conrad I of Bohemia
- Born: c. 1032; Bohemia
- Died: 14 January 1092 (aged c. 59–60); Bohemia
- Burial: Vyšehrad
- Spouse: Maria; Adelaide of Hungary; Świętosława of Poland
- Issue: Bretislaus II of Bohemia; Borivoj II of Bohemia; Vladislaus I of Bohemia; Soběslav I of Bohemia
- Dynasty: Přemyslid
- Father: Bretislaus I of Bohemia
- Mother: Judith of Schweinfurt

Vratislaus II (or Wratislaus II) (Czech: Vratislav II.) (c. 1032 – 14 January 1092), the son of Bretislaus I and Judith of Schweinfurt, was the first King of Bohemia as of 15 June 1085, his royal title granted as a lifetime honorific from Holy Roman Emperor Henry IV that did not establish a hereditary monarchy. Before his elevation to the royal dignity, Vratislaus had ruled Bohemia as duke since 1061.

On his father's death in 1055, Vratislaus became duke of Olomouc, whereas his older brother became Duke of Bohemia as Spytihněv II. He fell out with his brother and was exiled to Hungary. Vratislaus regained the ducal throne of Olomouc with Hungarian assistance and eventually reconciled with his brother, then succeeded him as duke of Bohemia when he died in 1061.

== Campaigns of Henry IV ==
Both Pope Alexander II and Pope Gregory VII confirmed Vratislaus in the privilege of wearing the mitre and tunic which his predecessors had. Despite this, Vratislaus supported Henry in both the Investiture Controversy against the Popes and the rebellions in Saxony that dominated his long reign. These actions would negate the significance of the mitre.

Vratislaus was often at odds with his brother Jaromír, Bishop of Prague. Jaromír, for his part, ignored the creation of a new Moravian diocese in Olomouc by Vratislaus in 1063. Jaromir even went so far as to retake, by arms, the relics removed from Prague and taken to Moravia. Despite the pope's support for Vratislaus' new see, the Bohemian duke was unswayed in his loyalty to the emperor.

The Saxons revolted under Duke Magnus of Saxony and Otto of Nordheim, Duke of Bavaria, in 1070 and Boleslaus of Poland attacked Bohemia in 1071. In August 1073, Henry responded with an invasion of Poland, but a new Saxon revolt drew him back in 1075. Vratislaus joined him, and they defeated the rebels on 9 June at the First Battle of Langensalza. The Bohemian troops showed conspicuous bravery. Henry then took Jaromír to Germany to be his chancellor under the name of Gebhard and Vratislaus was greatly relieved.

Vratislaus also took part in the wars against the anti-kings who opposed Henry's rule and were elected by a faction of the nobility to replace him. At the Battle of Flarchheim, only through the aid of Vratislaus' contingent was the imperial army capable of overcoming the rebels of the papally-approved claimant Rudolf of Rheinfelden, Duke of Swabia. Vratislaus even succeeded in seizing Rudolf's golden lance. The golden lance was then carried in front of Vratislaus on state occasions.

Vratislaus would defeat the rebels again at Mailberg in 1082, and it would be in thanks for this victory that Henry granted Vratislaus the title of king in 1085.

== Relations with the papacy ==
Vratislaus requested permission to utilize Slavonic liturgy to the Roman Curia in 1080; the request was denied. This petition may have been made in an effort to save a "Slavonic" Benedictine monastery still in operation that was founded in Sazava, close to Prague, in 1032.

Vratislaus raised an army to serve in Henry's Italian campaign of 1081. In 1083, Vratislaus and his Bohemians were with Henry when they entered Rome itself.

== Expansionism ==
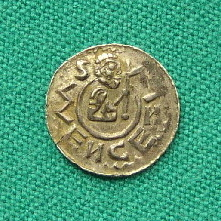
Denar of Vratislaus II.

Vratislaus coveted the largely Slavic marches of Meissen and Lusatia, but, in spite of Henry's promises and Bohemian successes against the rebellious margraves, he never received them. He held Lower Lusatia between 1075 and 1086, but in 1088, with the insurrection of Egbert II of Meissen, Henry granted the region to Henry of Ostmark. Vratislaus was thereafter cool to Henry's military adventures. He never wavered in his loyalty, but he abstained from giving the emperor martial aid.

== Internal affairs ==
It was a Přemyslid tradition that Moravia would be entrusted to the younger brothers of the ruling prince. In Vratislaus' case, his two younger brothers Conrad and Otto inherited Brno and Olomouc and the youngest, Jaromír, entered the church. However, enmity grew between the brothers. It was then that Vratislaus founded the diocese of Olmütz (diocese of Olomouc), under the Archbishopric of Mainz, to counter Otto's authority within his province. Both pope and emperor took a hand in mediating the conflict, which was partially fixed with Henry's appointment of Jaromír as chancellor in 1077. In April 1085, a reichstag convened in Mainz suppressed the Moravian see, but Vratislaus later re-founded see. Jaromír protested in Rome to Pope Urban II, but died in 1090 before a pope ruled on the matter.

Sadly for Vratislaus, his last years were occupied by dynastic quarrelling. When his brother Otto died in 1086, he gave Olomouc to his son Boleslaus, which was seen to be an act against the interests of Conrad. Vratislaus raised an army against Conrad and sent it out under his other son Bretislaus. This son turned on him. Vratislaus, in keeping with Bohemian custom, designated an heir: Conrad. Thus reconciled, the two attacked Bretislaus, who fled to Hungary.

Vratislaus died of a hunting wound on 14 January 1092 after a reign of thirty years. He was buried in St. Peter and Paul's Church, Vyšehrad.

== Legacy ==
Vratislaus frequently found himself in conflict with Bishop Jaromír of Prague and sought means to diminish the importance of the Bishop of Prague in domestic Bohemian politics. Among the actions he took were the re-establishment of the Bishopric of Olomouc in 1063 and the creation of the Vyšehrad Chapter in 1070. The latter was richly endowed independently of the Prague bishop, subject instead to the Holy See directly. His success in curbing the power of the Prague bishop helped to strengthen the Bohemian crown and enable later rulers to govern a more unified state. His policy towards the Holy Roman Empire set an example that would be followed in the twelfth century and would ultimately lead to the permanent elevation of Bohemia to the status of a kingdom at the beginning of the thirteenth century. The marriage alliances he was able to conclude with notable foreign princesses reflected the rising position of the Přemyslids among European dynasties. In contrast, Vratislaus's father Bretislaus in 1019 had to abduct his wife, the minor noblewoman Judith of Schweinfurt, to secure any suitable consort at all. His successor continued to cultivate dynastic bonds with notable courts in central and eastern Europe.

== Family ==
Vratislaus was married three times. His first wife Maria died during premature childbirth. He married the second time in 1057 to Adelaide, daughter of Andrew I of Hungary, who died in 1061. They had:

- Vratislaus (-1061)
- Judith (1056/58-1086), married to Ladislaus I Herman, son of Casimir I of Poland
- Ludmila (-after 1100)
- Bretislaus II of Bohemia (c. 1060–December 22, 1100), Duke of Bohemia

In 1062, Vratislaus married a third time to Swatawa of Poland, a daughter of Casimir I of Poland. They had five children:

- Boleslaus (-1091)
- Bořivoj II of Bohemia (c. 1064-February 2, 1124), Duke of Bohemia
- Vladislaus I of Bohemia (-April 12, 1125), Duke of Bohemia
- Soběslav I of Bohemia (-February 14, 1140), Duke of Bohemia
- Judith (c. 1066-9 December 1108), married to Wiprecht II of Groitzsch

== Literature ==
- Vratislav Vaníček: Vratislav II. (I.). První český král. Vyšehrad 2004, ISBN 80-7021-655-7
- Hans Patze: Die Pegauer Annalen, die Königserhebung Wratislaws v. Böhmen und die Anfänge der Stadt Pegau. JGMODtl 12, 1963, 1–62
- Percy Ernst Schramm: Böhmen und das Regnum: Die Verleihung der Königswürde an die Herzöge von Böhmen (1085/86,1158,1198/1203) (Adel und Kirche. G. Tellenbach z. 65. Geb. Hrsg. J. Fleckenstein-K. Schmid, 1968), 346–364.

Regnal titles
Preceded by Spytihněv II	Duke of Bohemia; 1061–1085	Vacant Title next held by Conrad I
New title	King of Bohemia; 1085–1092	Vacant Title next held by Vladislaus II
