= Ida of Wettin =

11th-century Duchess of Bohemia

- Duchess of Bohemia
- Born: c. 1031
- Died: after 1061
- Noble family: House of Wettin
- Spouse: Spytihněv II, Duke of Bohemia
- Father: Theodoric II, Margrave of Lower Lusatia
- Mother: Matilda of Meissen

Ida of Wettin (Czech: Ida Wettinská, German: Ida von Wettin, also Hidda von Eilenburg; born c. 1031; died after 1061), a member of the Saxon House of Wettin, was Duchess consort of Bohemia from 1055 until 1061 by her marriage with Duke Spytihněv II.

== Life ==
She was the younger daughter of Margrave Theodoric II of Lusatia and his wife Matilda, daughter of Margrave Eckard I of Meissen. Ida's father, former Count of Eilenburg, became Lusatian margrave in 1032 and was killed by the henchmen of his brother-in-law, Margrave Eckard II of Meissen on 19 November 1034.

Ida was married to the Přemyslid duke Spytihněv II of Bohemia and gave birth to two surviving children. Together with them she apparently was exiled from Bohemia after the death of her husband on 28 January 1061. Her daughter, whose name is not recorded, married a Saxon nobleman named Wichmann of Celle, whereas her son Svatobor (Frederick) became Patriarch of Aquileia in 1085, only to be murdered during a street disturbance in February 1086. She probably had another daughter, who became the first wife of Grand Prince Sviatopolk II of Kiev.

== Notes ==
Ida of Wettin House of Wettin Born: ? Died: after 1061
Royal titles
Preceded by Judith of Schweinfurt	Duchess consort of Bohemia; 1055–1061	Succeeded by Adelaide of Hungary
