= Bretislav I =

Duke of Bohemia from 1034 to 1055

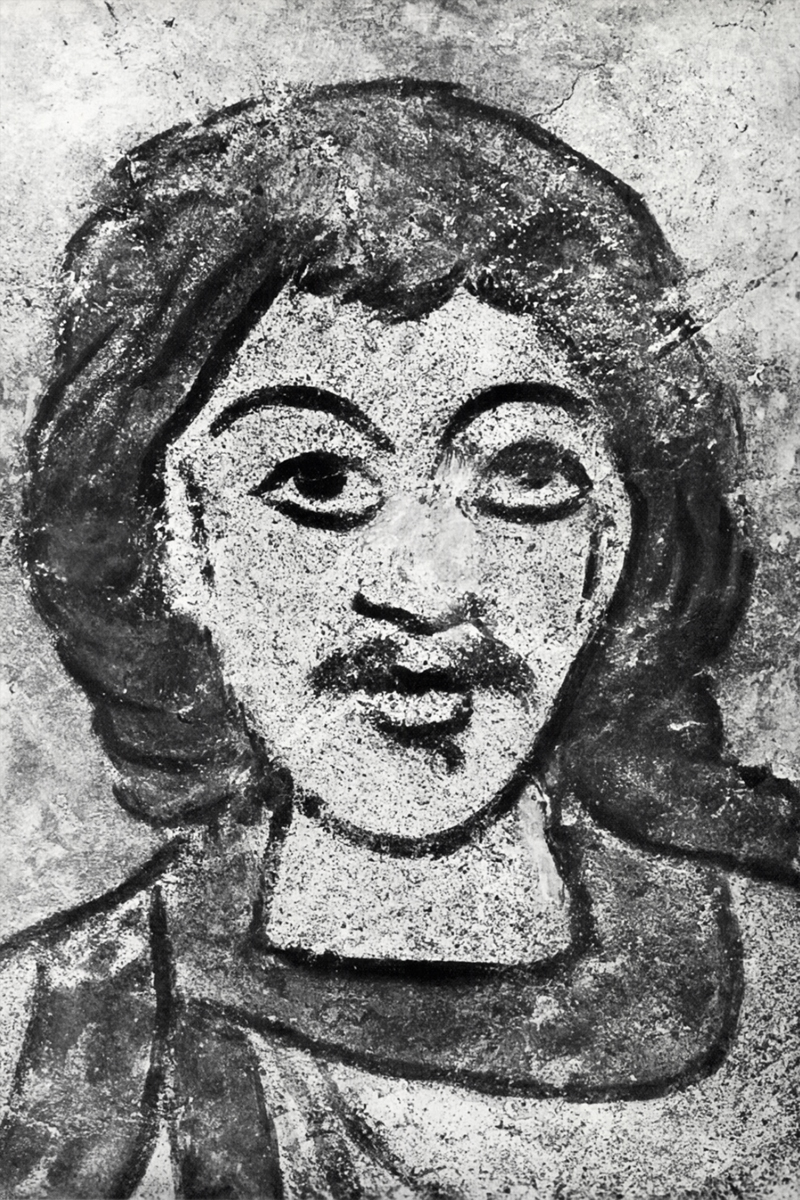
- 12th-century fresco depiction in the Znojmo Rotunda

Duke of Bohemia
- Reign: 1034 – 10 January 1055
- Predecessor: Oldřich
- Successor: Spytihněv II
- Born: c. 1002
- Died: 10 January 1055 (aged approx. 53); Chrudim
- Spouse: Judith of Schweinfurt
- Issue: Spytihněv II, Duke of Bohemia; Vratislaus II of Bohemia; Conrad I, Duke of Bohemia; Otto I of Olomouc; Jaromír, Bishop of Prague
- Dynasty: Přemyslid
- Father: Oldřich of Bohemia
- Mother: Božena

Bretislav I (Czech: Břetislav I.; c. 1002 – 10 January 1055), known as the "Bohemian Achilles", of the Přemyslid dynasty, was Duke of Bohemia from 1034 until his death in 1055.

== Youth ==
Bretislav was the son of Duke Oldřich and his low-born concubine Božena. As an illegitimate son who could not obtain a desirable wife by conventional means, he chose to kidnap Judith of Schweinfurt, a daughter of the Bavarian noble Henry of Schweinfurt, Margrave of Nordgau, in 1019 at Schweinfurt, and marry her.

During his father's reign, in 1019 or 1029, (Note: The exact date of the conquest of Moravia is unknown; Czech (and some Slovak) historians assert the earlier date, while their German and Polish colleagues recognize the latter one.) Bretislav took back Moravia from Poland. About 1030, he invaded Hungary in order to prevent its expansion under king Stephen. The partition of Bohemia between Oldřich and his brother Jaromír in 1034 was probably the reason why Bretislav fled beyond the Bohemian border, only to come back to take the throne after Jaromír's abdication.

== Raid into Poland ==
In 1035, Bretislav helped Holy Roman Emperor Conrad II in his war against the Lusatians. In 1039, he invaded Lesser and Greater Poland, captured Poznań, sacked Gniezno, and brought the relics of St. Adalbert, Radim Gaudentius and the Five Brothers back with him. Over the grave of St.Vojtěch in Hnězden he promulgated a set of legal regulations known as Břetislav's Decree (also known as the Hnězden Decree). On the way back, he regained part of Silesia, including Wrocław. His main goal was to set up an archbishopric in Prague and create a large state subject only to the Holy Roman Empire. His raid had an unintended enduring influence on Polish history, as the plundering and destruction of Gniezno forced the next Polish rulers to move their capital to Kraków, which would retain this role for many centuries ahead.

In 1040, the German King Henry III invaded Bohemia, but was forced to retreat after he lost the Battle at Brůdek (a pass in the Bohemian Forest). The following year, Henry III invaded again, skirted the border defences and laid siege to Bretislav in Prague. Forced by a mutiny among his nobles and betrayed by Bishop Šebíř of Prague, Bretislav had to renounce all of his conquests save for Moravia and recognize Henry III as his sovereign. In 1042, Emperor Henry III granted Bretislav Silesia as a lien.

In 1047, Emperor Henry III negotiated a peace treaty between Bretislav and the Poles. This pact worked in Bretislav's favour, as the Polish ruler swore never again to attack Bohemia in return for an annual subsidy to Gniezno.

== Domestic policy ==
Bretislav was the author of decrees concerning the rules of Christianization, which included a ban on polygamy and trade on holidays.

It was in 1030 that Bretislav married Judith of Schweinfurt. In 1054, he established rules for the ducal succession and introduced agnatic seniority as the law of succession. Younger members of the dynasty were supposed to govern fiefs (technically, parts of Moravia), but only at the duke's discretion. The result of this succession policy was the relative indivisibility of the Czech lands, but also bitter conflicts over succession and territorial primacy between members of the dynasty. It was effectively ended by the elevation of Bohemia to the status of a kingdom under Ottokar I of Bohemia, which led to the establishment of primogeniture as the ruling principle for succession rights.

Bretislav's eldest son Spytihněv was to succeed him as Duke of Bohemia with control over it domains. Moravia was incorporated into the Bohemian duchy, but divided among three of his younger sons. The Olomouc Appanage went to Vratislaus; the Znojmo Appanage went to Conrad I; and the Brno Appanage went to Otto I. The youngest son, Jaromír, entered the church and became Bishop of Prague.

Bretislav died at Chrudim in 1055 during preparations for another invasion of Hungary and was succeeded by his son Spytihněv II as Duke of Bohemia. His sons Otto and Vratislav were shut out of the government by Spytihněv, but after his death gained control of Moravia and Bohemia, respectively.

== Family ==
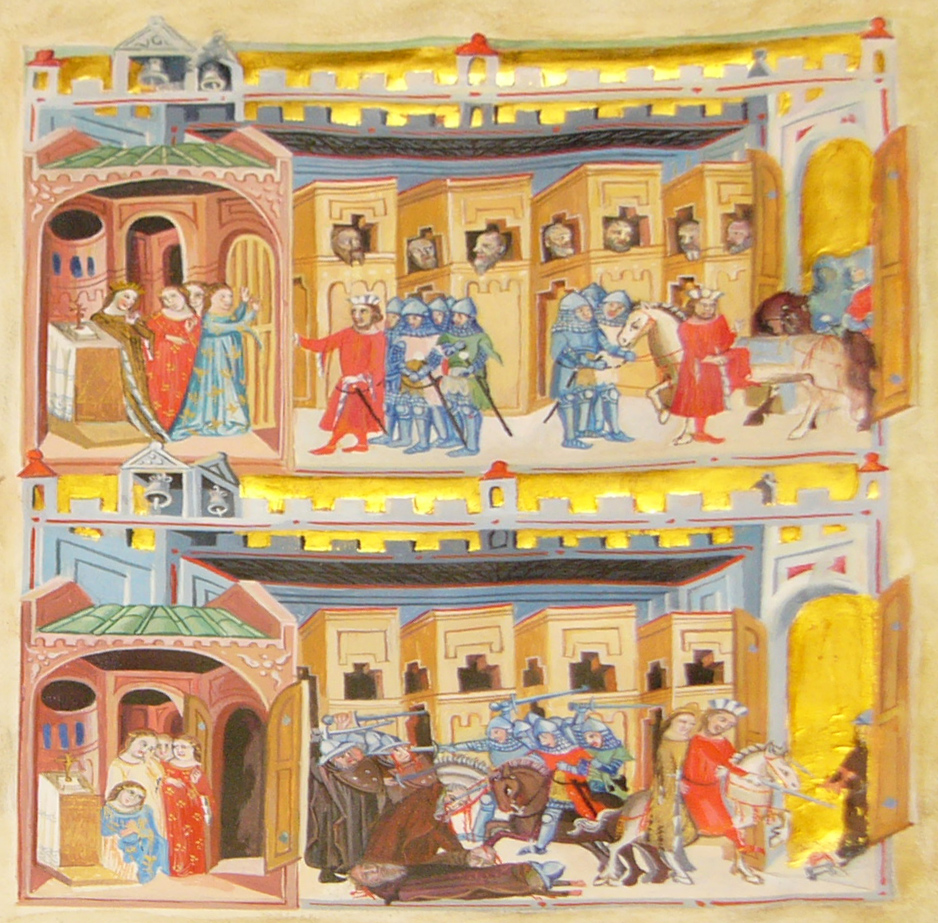
Bretislav kidnapping his future wife Judith of Schweinfurt from a monastery, from the Chronicle of Dalimil

Bretislav married Judith, the daughter of Margrave Henry of Schweinfurt. The House of Přemysl wished to confirm its good relationship with the Babenbergs through a marriage to Judith in 1020. Judith was a desirable bride, but Oldřich of Bohemia had only one son, Bretislav, and he was of illegitimate birth, thus complicating the prospect of a marriage with the high-born Judith. Bretislav solved the problem by kidnapping Judith from a monastery in Schweinfurt. He was never punished for this crime, and he married Judith some time later. Their first son Spytihněv was born after almost ten years, which led to the hypothesis that the kidnapping happened in 1029, although Judith may have given birth to daughters before her first son. In all, there were five sons from the marriage that survived into adulthood:

- Spytihněv II, Duke of Bohemia
- Vratislaus II of Bohemia
- Conrad I, Duke of Bohemia
- Otto I of Olomouc
- Jaromír, Bishop of Prague

== Legacy ==
Bretislav I was buried in the old St. Vitus Church in Prague, founded by Wenceslaus I in 930, and his tomb is now situated in the Chapel of St. Wenceslaus in the St. Vitus Cathedral built in the period 1344–66. Bretislav I was depicted in the fresco composition of the Přemyslid dynasty at the Znojmo Rotunda, painted in the period 1134–61.

== Sources ==
- Berend, Nora; Urbaniczyk, Przemyslaw; Wiszewski, Przemyslaw (2013). Central Europe in the High Middle Ages:Bohemia, Hungary and Poland, c.900-c.1300. Cambridge University Press.
- Krzemieńska, Barbara (1999). Břetislav I.: Čechy a střední Evropa v prvé polovině XI. století [Bretislav I: Bohemia and Central Europe in the first half of the 11th century] (in Czech) (2nd. ed.). Prague: Garamond. ISBN 80-901760-7-0.
- Krzemieńska, Barbara (1999). "Břetislav I." pp. 324–329.
- Krofta, Kamil (1957). "Bohemia to the Extinction of the Premyslids". In Tanner, J.R.; Previte-Orton, C.W.; Brooke, Z.N. (eds.). Cambridge Medieval History:Victory of the Papacy. Vol. VI. Cambridge University Press.
- Mahoney, William (2011). The History of the Czech Republic and Slovakia. ABC-CLIO.
- Pánek, Jaroslav (2009). A History of the Czech Lands. Charles University.
- Vercamer, Grischa (2022). "The Holy Roman Empire and East Central Europe (High Middle Ages):Politics and Influences". In Vercamer, Grischa; Zupka, Dušan (eds.). East Central and Eastern Europe in the Middle Ages, 450–1450. Brill. p. 356-396379.
- Wolfram, Herwig (2006). Conrad II, 990-1039: Emperor of Three Kingdoms. Translated by Kaiser, Denise A. The Pennsylvania State University Press.
- Wolverton, Lisa (2001). Hastening Toward Prague: Power and Society in the Medieval Czech Lands. University of Pennsylvania Press.

Bretislav I Přemyslid dynasty Born: c. 1002/1005 Died: 10 January 1055
Regnal titles
Preceded by Oldřich	Duke of Bohemia; 1035–1055	Succeeded by Spytihněv II
