= List of heads of the Czech state =

Below is list of historically documented heads of the Czech statehood in its various iterations, including rulers of Great Moravia in the period since 830 AD.

== The first Czech monarchs ==
=== Pre-Czech period ===
No.	Image	Name	Date	Notes
0		Samo	c. 600–c. 658	First written record in Chronicle of Fredegar (7th century). A Frankish merchant who unified several Slavic tribes against Avar raiders.

=== Legendary rulers of Bohemia (c. 644 - 870) ===
Legendary rulers
No.	Image	Name	Date	Notes
A	Pater Boemus on Říp Mountain	praotec Čech (Pater Boemus)	c. 644 - 661 according to 14th century Wenceslaus Hajek chronicle (disputed)	Legendary founding father of the Czech statehood (in the area of Říp). In written record first mentioned in Chronica Boemorum (12th century) and in Wielkopolska Chronicle (early 14th century, Poland).
?				Pause in written record.
B	Duke Krok with his daughters Kazi, Teta & Libuše	Krok	c. †709	Moved seat of power to Vyšehrad. In written record first mentioned in Chronica Boemorum (12th century).
C		Libuše	c. 709+	Krok's daughter, legendary ancestor of the Přemyslid dynasty, founder of the city of Prague. In written record first mentioned in Christian's Legend (10th century).
D		Přemysl the Ploughman	c. 710s+	Husband of princess Libuše of non-royal origin, legendary ancestor of the Přemyslid dynasty. In written record first mentioned in Christian's Legend (10th century).
E		Nezamysl (Simplicius)		Probably son of Libuše and Přemysl. In written record first mentioned in Chronica Boemorum (12th century).
F		Mnata (The Wise)		In written record first mentioned in Chronica Boemorum (12th century).
G		Vojen (The Fighting)		In written record first mentioned in Chronica Boemorum (12th century).
H		Vnislav		In written record first mentioned in Chronica Boemorum (12th century).
I		Křesomysl (The Inciter)		In written record first mentioned in Chronica Boemorum (12th century).
J		Neklan		In written record first mentioned in Chronica Boemorum (12th century).
K		Hostivít (The Welcomer)	c †870	Neklan's son, purported father of duke Bořivoj I. In written record first mentioned in Chronica Boemorum (12th century).
L		Lech	†805	First written record in 805 Annales Regni Francorum as being killed in battle by Charlemagne.

== Principality of Great Moravia (830-906) ==
=== House of Mojmír ===
No.	Image	Name	Date	Notes
1		Mojmír I	c.830–846	First written record in Royal Frankish Annals (822).
2		Rastislav	846–870	Nephew of Mojmír I. First Christian ruler. Invited Cyril and Methodius. First written record in Annales Fuldenses (9th century).
3		Slavomír	871 (interim)	Led a revolt against the Franks who had annexed Moravia during the incarceration of his relative, Svatopluk I. First written record in Annales Fuldenses (9th century).
4A		Svatopluk I	871–894	Dethroned Rastislav in 870. First written record in Annales Fuldenses (9th century).
5		Mojmír II	894–906?	Under his rule Bohemia seceded from Great Moravia in 895. Great Moravia began to disintegrate after his death. For later connection between Bohemia and Moravia see Moravia#Union with Bohemia.

== Dukes and Kings of Bohemia under Přemyslid dynasty (c. 870–1306) ==
=== Přemyslid dynasty ===
==== Feuds of Bohemia and Moravia under Premyslid rule ====
Part of Great Moravia (until 907)
Duchy of Bohemia (870–1198); Raised to: Kingdom of Bohemia (1198–1306)	Part of Poland (999–1019)
Duchy of Moravia (1019–1055)
Duchy of Brno (1st creation) (1055–1056)	Duchy of Znojmo (1st creation) (1055–1056)	Duchy of Olomouc (1st creation) (1055–1056)
Duchy of Olomouc (1061–1178)
Duchy of Brno (2nd creation) (1061–1182)	Duchy of Znojmo (2nd creation) (1092–1112)
Duchy of Znojmo (3rd creation) (1123–1182)
Duchy of Moravia (Znojmo line) (1182–1191)
Duchy of Moravia (1197–1222)

==== Table of rulers ====
Ruler	Born	Reign	Death	Ruling part	Consort	Notes
Bořivoj I	852; Son of Hostivít (?)	870-883 885-889	889 aged 35/6	Bohemia	Ludmila of Bohemia; 873 six children	First documented ruler of the dynasty.
Strojmír	?	c.883-885	?	Bohemia	?	Apparently a usurper.
Bohemia annexed to Great Moravia (889-894)
Spytihněv I	882; First son of Bořivoj I and Ludmila of Bohemia	894-915	915 aged 32/3	Bohemia (with Moravia since 907)	Unmarried	His reign restored Bohemian sovereignty.
Vratislaus I (Vratislav)	888; Second son of Bořivoj I and Ludmila of Bohemia	915 - 13 February 921	13 February 921 aged 32/3	Bohemia	Drahomíra three children	
Regencies of Ludmila of Bohemia (921) and Drahomíra (921-925)						Known as St. Wenceslaus ("Good King Wenceslas" for English-speaking people), the patron saint of the Czech lands.
Wenceslaus I the Good (Václav Dobrý)	907 (Note: Most frequently cited year of birth; other cited years are 908 or 911.); Stochov; First son of Vratislaus I and Drahomíra	13 February 921- 28 September 929/35	28 September 929/35; Stará Boleslav aged 21/2 or 27/8	Bohemia	Unmarried	Known as St. Wenceslaus ("Good King Wenceslas" for English-speaking people), the patron saint of the Czech lands.
Boleslaus I the Cruel (Boleslav I. Ukrutný)	915; Prague (?); Second son of Vratislaus I and Drahomíra	28 September 929/35 - July 972	July 972 aged 56/7	Bohemia	Biagota four children	Assassinated his brother to ascend to the ducal throne.
Boleslaus II the Pious (Boleslav II. Pobožný)	940; Prague (?); Son of Boleslaus I and Biagota	July 972 - 7 February 999	7 February 999 aged 58/9	Bohemia	Adiva (of England?) four children Emma of Mělník (Emma of Italy (?)); 989 no children	Moravia is again lost, this time, to Poland, in 999.
Boleslaus III the Red (Boleslav III. Ryšavý)	965; First son of Boleslaus II and Adiva	7 February 999 - May 1002 February - March 1003	1037 aged 56/7	Bohemia	Unknown	In 1002–04, Bohemia was invaded twice by Poland.
Bohemia was annexed to Poland (1002–04): May 1002 - February 1003: Vladivoj (Władywoj), son of Mieszko I of Poland; March 1003 – 1004: Bolesław I the Brave, King of Poland.
Jaromír	c.970 Second son of Boleslaus II and Adiva	1004 - 12 April 1012 9 November 1034 - 1035	4 November 1038; Lysá nad Labem aged 60/70	Bohemia	Unknown	In 1004, Jaromir occupied Prague with a German army and proclaimed himself Bohemian duke, restoring the family's domain, albeit reduced. As brothers of Boleslaus III, Jaromir and Ulrich had a fight for the throne that lasted until 1034, when Ulrich died and Jaromir retired (and then murdered). Nevertheless, more land was at stake, as Moravia was reintegrated into Bohemia in 1019, after being reconquered from Poland, and given to Ulrich's son.
Ulrich I (Oldřich)	c.975 Third son of Boleslaus II and Adiva	12 April 1012 - 9 November 1034	9 November 1034 or 1042 aged 59/60 or 66/7	Bohemia	Božena c.1002 one child	In 1004, Jaromir occupied Prague with a German army and proclaimed himself Bohemian duke, restoring the family's domain, albeit reduced. As brothers of Boleslaus III, Jaromir and Ulrich had a fight for the throne that lasted until 1034, when Ulrich died and Jaromir retired (and then murdered). Nevertheless, more land was at stake, as Moravia was reintegrated into Bohemia in 1019, after being reconquered from Poland, and given to Ulrich's son.
Ulrich I (Oldřich)	c.975 Third son of Boleslaus II and Adiva	1033 - 9 November 1034	9 November 1034 or 1042 aged 59/60 or 66/7	Moravia	Božena c.1002 one child	In 1004, Jaromir occupied Prague with a German army and proclaimed himself Bohemian duke, restoring the family's domain, albeit reduced. As brothers of Boleslaus III, Jaromir and Ulrich had a fight for the throne that lasted until 1034, when Ulrich died and Jaromir retired (and then murdered). Nevertheless, more land was at stake, as Moravia was reintegrated into Bohemia in 1019, after being reconquered from Poland, and given to Ulrich's son.
Bretislaus I the Bohemian Achilles (Břetislav I. český Achilles)	1002/5; Son of Ulrich I and Božena	1019/29 – 1033 9 November 1034 – 10 January 1055	10 January 1055 aged 50/3	Moravia	Judith of Schweinfurt; 1020 four children	First separation of Moravia from Bohemia. His father usurped his place for a year. After his own death, his sons shared the inheritance.
Bretislaus I the Bohemian Achilles (Břetislav I. český Achilles)	1002/5; Son of Ulrich I and Božena	1035 - 10 January 1055	10 January 1055 aged 50/3	Bohemia	Judith of Schweinfurt; 1020 four children	First separation of Moravia from Bohemia. His father usurped his place for a year. After his own death, his sons shared the inheritance.
Spytihněv II	1031; First son of Bretislaus I and Judith of Schweinfurt	10 January 1055 - 28 January 1061	28 January 1061 aged 29/30	Bohemia (also in Moravia from 1056)	Ida of Wettin; 1054 one child	Children of Bretislav I, divided their inheritance: Spytihnev kept Bohemia; the others divided Moravia: Conrad received Brno; Vratislav got Olomouc; Otto inherited Znojmo.; The division was made ineffective by Spytihnev (1055), who extended his rule to Moravia, uniting the whole Premyslid domain under his control. However, after his death (1061), the landless brothers recovered the inheritance and divided it differently, as Vratislav inherited Bohemia: Conrad recovered Brno but also received Otto's share in Znojmo; Otto received Vratislav's part in Olomouc.
Vratislaus II (Vratislav II)	c.1035 Second son of Bretislaus I and Judith of Schweinfurt	10 January 1055 – 1056	14 January 1092	Olomouc	Maria before 1057 no children Adelaide of Hungary (I); 1057 four children Świętosława of Poland; 1062 five children	
Vratislaus II (Vratislav II)	c.1035 Second son of Bretislaus I and Judith of Schweinfurt	28 January 1061 - June 1085 (as Duke) June 1085 - 14 January 1092 (as King)	14 January 1092	Bohemia	Maria before 1057 no children Adelaide of Hungary (I); 1057 four children Świętosława of Poland; 1062 five children	
Conrad I (Konrád I)	c.1035 Third son of Bretislaus I and Judith of Schweinfurt	10 January 1055 – 1056 28 January 1061 - 6 September 1092	6 September 1092	Brno (with Znojmo since 1061)	Wirpirk of Tengling; 1054 two children	
Conrad I (Konrád I)	c.1035 Third son of Bretislaus I and Judith of Schweinfurt	14 January 1092 - 6 September 1092	6 September 1092	Bohemia	Wirpirk of Tengling; 1054 two children	
Otto I the Fair (Ota Sličný)	1045; Fourth son of Bretislaus I and Judith of Schweinfurt	10 January 1055 – 1056	9 June 1087 aged 41/2	Znojmo	Euphemia of Hungary before 1073 two children	
Otto I the Fair (Ota Sličný)	1045; Fourth son of Bretislaus I and Judith of Schweinfurt	28 January 1061 - 9 June 1087	9 June 1087 aged 41/2	Olomouc	Euphemia of Hungary before 1073 two children	
Boleslaus (Boleslav)	1062; First son of Otto I and Euphemia of Hungary	9 June 1087 – 11 August 1091	11 August 1091 aged 28/9	Olomouc	Unmarried	
Bretislaus II (Břetislav II)	c.1060 Son of Vratislaus II and Adelaide of Hungary (I)	6 September 1092 - 22 December 1100	22 December 1100 aged 39/40	Bohemia	Lukarta of Bogen; 1094 one child	
Ulrich (II) (Oldřich)	c.1070/80? First son of Conrad I and Wirpirk of Tengling	6 September 1092 – 5 January 1113	5 January 1113 aged c.33/43?	Brno (with Znojmo since 1112)	Adelaide two children	Children of Conrad I, divided the inheritance: Luitpold received Znojmo; Ulrich inherited Brno.; Despite having heirs, Luitpold's land came to Ulrich's possession after his death. Conrad II, Luitpold's heir, would come to power in 1123.
Luitpold (I) (Litold znojemský)	c.1070/80? Second son of Conrad I and Wirpirk of Tengling	6 September 1092 – 15 March 1112	15 March 1112 aged c.32/42?	Znojmo	Ida of Austria one child	Children of Conrad I, divided the inheritance: Luitpold received Znojmo; Ulrich inherited Brno.; Despite having heirs, Luitpold's land came to Ulrich's possession after his death. Conrad II, Luitpold's heir, would come to power in 1123.
Bořivoj II	c.1064 Prague; First son of Vratislaus II and Świętosława of Poland	25 December 1100 - May 1107 December 1117 - 16 August 1120	2 February 1124 aged 39/40	Bohemia	Helbirga of Austria; October 1100; Znojmo no children	Ruled twice. Retired in 1120.
Svatopluk (I) the Lion (Svatopluk Olomoucký)	1075; Second son of Otto I and Euphemia of Hungary	11 August 1091 – 21 September 1109	21 September 1109 aged 33/4	Olomouc	Unknown one child	
Svatopluk (I) the Lion (Svatopluk Olomoucký)	1075; Second son of Otto I and Euphemia of Hungary	May 1107 – 21 September 1109	21 September 1109 aged 33/4	Bohemia	Unknown one child	
Vladislaus I (Vladislav I)	c.1065 Second son of Vratislaus II and Świętosława of Poland	21 September 1109 - December 1117 16 August 1120 - 12 April 1125	12 April 1125; Prague aged 59/60	Bohemia	Richeza of Berg; 1110/11 four children	Ruled twice.
Sobeslaus I	c.1075 Third son of Vratislaus II and Świętosława of Poland	5 January 1113 – 1123	14 February 1140 aged 64/5	Brno (with Znojmo)	Adelaide of Hungary (II); 1123 five children	Ruled Brno and Znojmo, which split after his resign: Znojmo returned to its heir, Conrad II; Brno was absorbed by Olomouc, the other Moravian feud.
Sobeslaus I	c.1075 Third son of Vratislaus II and Świętosława of Poland	12 April 1125 – 14 February 1140	14 February 1140 aged 64/5	Bohemia	Adelaide of Hungary (II); 1123 five children	Ruled Brno and Znojmo, which split after his resign: Znojmo returned to its heir, Conrad II; Brno was absorbed by Olomouc, the other Moravian feud.
Otto II the Black (Ota II. Černý)	1085; Third son of Otto I and Euphemia of Hungary	21 September 1109 – 18 February 1126	18 February 1126 aged 40/1	Olomouc (with Brno)	Sophia of Berg; 1113 three children	Ruled in Olomouc, since 1091 with his brother Svatopluk. Acquired Brno in 1123.
Conrad II (Konrád II)	c.1100/10? Son of Luitpold I and Ida of Austria	1123 – 1161	1161 aged c.50/51 or c.60/61?	Znojmo	Maria of Serbia; 1132 four children	Received his heritage in 1123.
Wenceslaus Henry (Václav Jindřich)	1107; Son of Svatopluk (I)	18 February 1126 – 1 March 1130	1 March 1130 aged 22/3	Olomouc	Unmarried	Heirs of previous rulers of their portions, after Otto II's death inherited their respective inheritances.
Vratislaus (II) (Vratislav)	c.1100/11 Brno; Son of Ulrich (II) and Adelaide	18 February 1126 – 6 August 1156	6 August 1156; Brno aged 45/6	Brno	A Russian princess 1132 three children	Heirs of previous rulers of their portions, after Otto II's death inherited their respective inheritances.
Luitpold (II) (Lupolt Olomoucký)	1102; Son of Bořivoj II and Helbirga of Austria	1 March 1130 – 1137	1143 aged 40/1	Olomouc	Unmarried	Appointed and deposed by Sobeslaus, then the senior duke in Bohemia, who replaced him in Olomouc with his own son.
Vladislaus (Vladislav)	? First son of Sobeslaus I and Adelaide of Hungary (II)	1137 – 1140	1165	Olomouc	Daughter of Albert the Bear no children	Probably resigned, waiting for succeed in Bohemia; however it was another Vladislaus who ended up ascending the seniority position in Bohemia.
Vladislaus II (Vladislav II)	c.1110 Son of Vladislaus I and Richeza of Berg	14 February 1140 - 11 January 1158 (as Duke) 11 January 1158 - 1172 (as King)	18 January 1174; Meerane aged 63/4	Bohemia	Gertrude of Austria; 1140 six children Judith of Thuringia; 1155 three children	Resigned in 1172.
Otto III (Ota III)	1122; Son of Otto II and Sophia of Berg	1140 – 12 May 1160	12 May 1160 aged 37/8	Olomouc	Durancia five children	
Spytihněv (II)	? Son of Vratislaus (II)	6 August 1156 – 1182	1199	Brno	Umarried	In 1182, abdicated for Conrad Otto of Znojmo
Brno annexed to Znojmo
Frederick (Bedřich)	1142; Son of Vladislaus II and Gertrude of Austria	12 May 1160 – 1173	25 March 1189	Olomouc	Elizabeth of Hungary; 1157 six children	
Frederick (Bedřich)	1142; Son of Vladislaus II and Gertrude of Austria	1172 – 1173 1178 – 25 March 1189	25 March 1189	Bohemia	Elizabeth of Hungary; 1157 six children	
Ulrich (III)	1134; Second son of Sobeslaus I and Adelaide of Hungary (II)	1173 – 18 October 1177	18 October 1177 aged 42/3	Olomouc	Cecilia of Thuringia no children Sophia of Meissen no children	
Sobeslaus II the Prince of the Peasants (Soběslav II. kníže sedláků)	1128; Third son of Sobeslaus I and Adelaide of Hungary (II)	1173 – 1178	29 January 1180 aged 51/2	Bohemia	Elisabeth of Greater Poland no children	
Wenceslaus II	1137; Fourth son of Sobeslaus I and Adelaide of Hungary (II)	18 October 1177 – 1178	after 1192	Olomouc	Unmarried	Abdicated for Conrad III.
Wenceslaus II	1137; Fourth son of Sobeslaus I and Adelaide of Hungary (II)	9 September 1191 - 1192	after 1192	Bohemia	Unmarried	Abdicated for Conrad III.
Olomouc annexed to Znojmo
Conrad III Otto (Konrád III. Ota)	c.1136 Son of Conrad II and Maria of Serbia	1161 – 1182	9 September 1191 aged 54/5	Znojmo	Hellicha of Wittelsbach before 1176 no children	Son of Conrad II. United Znojmo and Olomouc. Brno joined in 1182, when he also became the first Margrave of Moravia.
Conrad III Otto (Konrád III. Ota)	c.1136 Son of Conrad II and Maria of Serbia	1182 – 9 September 1191	9 September 1191 aged 54/5	Moravia	Hellicha of Wittelsbach before 1176 no children	Son of Conrad II. United Znojmo and Olomouc. Brno joined in 1182, when he also became the first Margrave of Moravia.
Conrad III Otto (Konrád III. Ota)	c.1136 Son of Conrad II and Maria of Serbia	1189 – 9 September 1191	9 September 1191 aged 54/5	Bohemia	Hellicha of Wittelsbach before 1176 no children	Son of Conrad II. United Znojmo and Olomouc. Brno joined in 1182, when he also became the first Margrave of Moravia.
Bretislaus III Henry (Břetislav III. Jindřich)	1137; Son of Henry and Margaret (?)	1193 - 15/19 June 1197	15/19 June 1197	Bohemia	Unmarried	Son of Henry, brother of King Vladislaus II. Also Bishop of Prague (1182-97).
Vladislaus III Henry (Vladislav III. Jindřich)	1137; Second son of Vladislaus II and Judith of Thuringia	22 June - 6 December 1197	12 August 1222	Bohemia	Heilwida no children	Left no descendants. After his death, Moravia became an appanage of Bohemian princes.
Vladislaus III Henry (Vladislav III. Jindřich)	1137; Second son of Vladislaus II and Judith of Thuringia	December 1197 – 12 August 1222	12 August 1222	Moravia	Heilwida no children	Left no descendants. After his death, Moravia became an appanage of Bohemian princes.
Premislaus Ottokar I (Přemysl Otakar I)	1155; First son of Vladislaus II and Judith of Thuringia	1192 - 1193 6 December 1197 - 1198 (as Duke) 1198 - 15 December 1230 (as King)	15 December 1230; Prague aged 74/5	Bohemia	Adelaide of Meissen; 1178 (annulled 1199) one child Constance of Hungary; 1199 nine children	First king of hereditary royal title, confirmed by Frederick II, Holy Roman Emperor in 1212 by issuing the Golden Bull of Sicily.
Wenceslaus I the One-Eyed (Václav I. Jednooký)	1205; Son of Premislaus Ottokar I and Constance of Hungary	15 December 1230 - 23 September 1253	23 December 1253; Králův Dvůr aged 47/8	Bohemia	Kunigunde of Hohenstaufen; 1224 five children	
Premislaus Ottokar II The Iron and Golden King (Přemysl Otakar II. král železný a zlatý)	1233; Městec Králové; Son of Wenceslaus I and Kunigunde of Hohenstaufen	23 December 1253 - 26 August 1278	26 August 1278; Dürnkrut aged 44/5	Bohemia	Margaret of Austria; 11 February 1252; Hainburg an der Donau (annulled 1261) no children Kunigunda Rostislavna of Halych; 25 October 1261; Pressburg three children	Also Duke of Austria, Styria, Carinthia and Friuli and margrave of Carniola.
Regencies of Kunigunda Rostislavna of Halych (1278-1285) and Otto V, Margrave of Brandenburg (1278-1283)						Also Duke of Cracow (from 1291) and King of Poland (1300–1305).
Wenceslaus II (Václav II)	27 September 1271; PragueSon of Premislaus Ottokar II and Kunigunda Rostislavna of Halych	26 August 1278 - 21 June 1305	21 June 1305; Prague aged 33	Bohemia	Judith of Austria; January 1285; Cheb ten children Elizabeth Richeza of Poland; 26 May 1303; Prague one child	Also Duke of Cracow (from 1291) and King of Poland (1300–1305).
Wenceslaus III (Václav III)	6 October 1289; Son of Wenceslaus II and Judith of Austria	21 June 1305 - 4 August 1306	4 August 1306; Olomouc aged 16	Bohemia	Viola of Cieszyn; 5 October 1305; Brno no children	Uncrowned (as Bohemian king). Also King of Hungary (1301–1305) and King of Poland.
Anna (Anna Přemyslovna)	10 October 1290; Daughter of Wenceslaus II and Judith of Austria	4 August 1306 - 1306; 3/4 July 1307 - 3 December 1310	3 Septembre 1313; Olomouc aged 16	Bohemia	Henry; 1306 no children	Heiresses of Bohemia, they were the true inheritors of the power claimed by their husbands during the succession crisis. Of the three, Rudolf had the weakest claim, and also the lowest popularity. The conflict was settled when, in 1310, Elizabeth and John invaded Prague, and defeated their opponents, Anna and Henry.
Henry of Carinthia (Note: VI as duke of Carinthia.) (Jindřich Korutanský)	1265; Son of Meinhard, Duke of Carinthia and Elisabeth of Bavaria	4 August 1306 - 1306; 3/4 July 1307 - 3 December 1310	2 April 1335; Tirol aged 69/70	Bohemia	Anna; 1306 no children Adelaide of Brunswick-Lüneburg; 1313 two children Beatrice of Savoy; 1327 no children	Heiresses of Bohemia, they were the true inheritors of the power claimed by their husbands during the succession crisis. Of the three, Rudolf had the weakest claim, and also the lowest popularity. The conflict was settled when, in 1310, Elizabeth and John invaded Prague, and defeated their opponents, Anna and Henry.
Elisabeth Richeza of Poland (Eliška-Rejčka)	1 September 1288; Poznań; Daughter of Przemysł II of Poland and Richeza of Sweden	1306 - 3/4 July 1307	19 October 1335; Brno aged 47	Bohemia	Wenceslaus II; 26 May 1303; Prague one child Rudolf; 16 October 1306; Prague no children	Heiresses of Bohemia, they were the true inheritors of the power claimed by their husbands during the succession crisis. Of the three, Rudolf had the weakest claim, and also the lowest popularity. The conflict was settled when, in 1310, Elizabeth and John invaded Prague, and defeated their opponents, Anna and Henry.
Rudolf of Habsburg the Good (Rudolf Habsburský, Rudolf Dobrý)	c. 1281; Vienna; Eldest son of Albert I of Germany and Elisabeth of Gorizia-Tyrol	1306 - 3/4 July 1307	Blanche of France; 25 May 1300 one child Elisabeth Richeza; 16 October 1306; Prague no children	Bohemia	3/4 July 1307; Horažďovice aged 26	Heiresses of Bohemia, they were the true inheritors of the power claimed by their husbands during the succession crisis. Of the three, Rudolf had the weakest claim, and also the lowest popularity. The conflict was settled when, in 1310, Elizabeth and John invaded Prague, and defeated their opponents, Anna and Henry.
Elisabeth (Eliška Přemyslovna)	20 January 1292; Prague; Daughter of Wenceslaus II and Judith of Austria	3 December 1310 - 28 September 1330	28 September 1330; Prague aged 38	Bohemia	John; 1 September 1310; Prague seven children	Heiresses of Bohemia, they were the true inheritors of the power claimed by their husbands during the succession crisis. Of the three, Rudolf had the weakest claim, and also the lowest popularity. The conflict was settled when, in 1310, Elizabeth and John invaded Prague, and defeated their opponents, Anna and Henry.
John of Luxembourg the Blind (Jan Lucemburský, Jan Slepý)	10 August 1296; Luxembourg; Son of Henry VII, Holy Roman Emperor and Margaret of Brabant	3 December 1310 - 26 August 1346	26 August 1346; Crécy-en-Ponthieu aged 50	Bohemia	Elisabeth; 1 September 1310; Prague seven children Beatrice of Bourbon; December 1334; Vincennes one child	Heiresses of Bohemia, they were the true inheritors of the power claimed by their husbands during the succession crisis. Of the three, Rudolf had the weakest claim, and also the lowest popularity. The conflict was settled when, in 1310, Elizabeth and John invaded Prague, and defeated their opponents, Anna and Henry.

== The Late Kingdom of Bohemia: from the House of Luxembourg to Austria-Hungary (1310–1918) ==
Kings of Bohemia
House of Luxembourg
39		John the Blind (Jan Lucemburský)	1310–1346	Son-in-law of Wenceslaus II.
40		Charles I (Karel I.)	1346–1378	Son of John. Also Holy Roman Emperor as Charles IV.
41		Wenceslaus IV (Václav IV.)	1378–1419	Son of Charles I. Also King of the Romans until 1400.
42		Sigismund (Zikmund)	1419–1437	Brother of Wenceslaus IV. Ruled effective 1436–1437 only (because of the Hussite Revolution). Also Holy Roman Emperor and King of Hungary.
House of Habsburg
43		Albert (Albrecht Habsburský)	1437–1439	Son-in-law of Sigismund. Also King of the Romans and of Hungary.
	Interregnum	1440–1453	The succession of Albert's son was not recognized by the Czech nobility for most of this era; the land was administered by the Landfrieden (provincial and territorial).	
44		Ladislaus the Posthumous (Ladislav Pohrobek)	1453–1457	Son of Albert born after his father's death. Also King of Hungary.
Non-Dynastic
45		George of Podebrady (Jiří z Poděbrad)	1457–1471	Elected king from the Czech noble family House of Kunštát. Although he had descendants, the succession devolved to the prince from Polish kingdom.
46		Matthias Corvinus (Matyáš Korvín)	1469–1490	King of Hungary, elected by the insurgent Catholic Czech aristocrats as anti-king in 1469, but never crowned. In 1479, he agreed to limit his rule to Moravia, Silesia, and Lusatia, while retaining his title.
House of Jagiellon
47		Vladislaus II the Jagiellonian (Vladislav II. Jagellonský)	1471–1516	Nephew of Ladislaus the Posthumous; elected on request of his predecessor George. Also King of Hungary after 1490.
48		Louis the Jagiellonian (Ludvík Jagellonský)	1516–1526	Son of Vladislaus II. Also King of Hungary.
House of Habsburg
49		Ferdinand I	1526–1564	Brother-in-law of Louis; elected king. Also King of Hungary and Holy Roman Emperor-elect from 1558.
50		Maximilian I (Maxmilián I.)	1564–1576	Son of Ferdinand I, grandson of Vladislaus II. Also King of Hungary and Holy Roman Emperor.
51		Rudolph II (Rudolf II.)	1576–1611	Son of Maximilian I. Also King of Hungary and Holy Roman Emperor.
52		Mathias (Matyáš)	1611–1619	Brother of Rudolph II. Also King of Hungary and Holy Roman Emperor.
House of Wittelsbach
53		Frederick I (Fridrich I.)	1619–1620	Elected by the Crown's Estates at the beginning of the Thirty Years' War, but after losing the Battle of White Mountain, he fled the country.
Usurpers and hereditary kings
House of Habsburg
54		Ferdinand II	1619–1637	Cousin of Matthias. Also King of Hungary and Holy Roman Emperor.
55		Ferdinand III	1637–1657	Son of Ferdinand II. Also King of Hungary and Holy Roman Emperor. From this time on, Bohemia no longer had an elective monarchy, with the Habsburgs having imposed their exclusive rule at the Battle of the White Mountain.
56		Ferdinand IV	1646–1654	Son of Ferdinand III. Junior co-monarch during his father's reign. Also King of Hungary and King of the Romans.
57		Leopold I	1657–1705	Brother of Ferdinand IV. Also King of Hungary and Holy Roman Emperor.
58		Joseph I (Josef I.)	1705–1711	Son of Leopold I. Also King of Hungary and Holy Roman Emperor.
59		Charles II (Karel II.)	1711–1740	Brother of Joseph I. Also King of Hungary and Holy Roman Emperor as Charles VI.
60		Maria Theresa (Marie Terezie)	1740–1780	Daughter of Charles II. Also Queen of Hungary.
House of Wittelsbach
61		Charles Albert (Karel Albrecht)	1741–1743	Son-in-law of Joseph I. Anti-king to Maria Theresa during the War of the Austrian Succession. Also Holy Roman Emperor as Charles VII.
House of Habsburg-Lorraine
62		Joseph II (Josef II.)	1780–1790	Son of Maria Theresa. Also King of Hungary and Holy Roman Emperor.
63		Leopold II	1790–1792	Brother of Joseph II. Also King of Hungary and Holy Roman Emperor.
64		Francis I (František I.)	1792–1835	Son of Leopold II. Also King of Hungary, Holy Roman Emperor to 1806, Emperor of Austria from 1804.
65		Ferdinand V	1835–1848	Son of Francis I. Also Emperor of Austria and King of Hungary. Last crowned King of Bohemia. Forced to abdicate during the Revolution of 1848.
66		Francis Joseph I (František Josef I.)	1848–1916	Nephew of Ferdinand V. Also Emperor of Austria and King of Hungary.
67		Charles III (Karel III.)	1916–1918	Grandnephew of Francis Joseph I. Also Emperor of Austria and King of Hungary. Ruled briefly during World War I; in November 1918 renounced participation in state affairs but did not abdicate.

== Presidents of Czechoslovakia (1918–1992) ==
- Czechoslovak National Social Party (ČSNS)
- Communist Party of Czechoslovakia (KSČ)
- Civic Forum (OF)
- Independent

No.	Portrait	Name	Lifespan	Ethnicity	Elected	Took office	Left office	Political affiliation(s)
First Czechoslovak Republic (1918–1938)
68		Tomáš Garrigue Masaryk	1850–1937	Czech	1918; 1920; 1927; 1934	14 November 1918	14 December 1935	Independent
—		Milan Hodža	1878–1944	Slovak	Acting	14 December 1935	18 December 1935	RSZML
69		Edvard Beneš	1884–1948	Czech	1935	18 December 1935	5 October 1938	ČSNS
—		Jan Syrový	1888–1970	Czech	Acting	5 October 1938	30 November 1938	Independent
Second Czechoslovak Republic (1938–1939)
70		Emil Hácha	1872–1945	Czech	1938	30 November 1938	15 March 1939	Independent
Occupation (1939–1945); Emil Hácha became State President of the Protectorate of Bohemia and Moravia, a de jure autonomous region incorporated into Nazi Germany. Jozef Tiso became President of the pseudo-independent, pro-Nazi and clero-fascist Slovak Republic. Avgustyn Voloshyn became President of the Carpatho-Ukraine few days before occupation by the Kingdom of Hungary.
Czechoslovak government-in-exile (1940–1945)
—		Edvard Beneš	1884–1948	Czech	1940	21 July 1940	4 April 1945	ČSNS
Third Czechoslovak Republic (1945–1948)
69		Edvard Beneš	1884–1948	Czech	1946	4 April 1945	7 June 1948	ČSNS
Communist Era (1948–1989); Official names: Czechoslovak Republic (1948–1960), Czechoslovak Socialist Republic (1960–1989)
71		Klement Gottwald	1896–1953	Czech	1948	7 June 1948 acting to 14 June 1948	14 March 1953 (died in office)	KSČ
72		Antonín Zápotocký	1884–1957	Czech	1953	14 March 1953 acting to 21 March 1953	13 November 1957 (died in office)	KSČ
—		Viliam Široký	1902–1971	Hungarian	Acting	13 November 1957	19 November 1957	KSČ
73		Antonín Novotný	1904–1975	Czech	1957; 1964	19 November 1957	22 March 1968	KSČ
—		Jozef Lenárt	1923–2004	Slovak	Acting	22 March 1968	30 March 1968	KSČ
74		Ludvík Svoboda	1895–1979	Czech	1968; 1973	30 March 1968	28 May 1975	KSČ
75		Gustáv Husák	1913–1991	Slovak	1975; 1980; 1985	29 May 1975	10 December 1989	KSČ
—		Marián Čalfa	1946-	Slovak	Acting	10 December 1989	29 December 1989	KSČ
Post–Communist Era (1989–1992); Official names: Czechoslovak Socialist Republic (1989–1990), Czech and Slovak Federative Republic (1990–1992)
76		Václav Havel	1936–2011	Czech	1989; 1990; 1992 (failed)	29 December 1989	20 July 1992	OF
—		Jan Stráský	1940–2019	Czech	Acting	20 July 1992	31 December 1992 (dissolution of the country)	ODS

== Presidents of the Czech Republic (1993–present) ==
Parties

Independent ODS ČSSD SPO

	President (Birth–Death)	Took office	Left office	Party	Term	Previous office(s)
—	Václav Klaus (born 1941)	1 January 1993	2 February 1993	Civic Democratic Party (ODS)	Acting jointly	Minister of Finance of Czechoslovakia (1989–1992), Incumbent Prime Minister (1992–1998) acting pending the presidential election
—	Milan Uhde (born 1936)	1 January 1993	2 February 1993	Civic Democratic Party (ODS)	Acting jointly	Incumbent Chairman of the Lower House of Parliament (1993–1996) acting pending the presidential election
76	Václav Havel (1936–2011)	2 February 1993	2 February 2003	Independent	1 (1993)	President of the Czech and Slovak Federative Republic (1989–1992)
76	Václav Havel (1936–2011)	2 February 1993	2 February 2003	Independent	2 (1998)	President of the Czech and Slovak Federative Republic (1989–1992)
—	Vladimír Špidla (born 1951)	3 February 2003	7 March 2003	ČSSD	Acting jointly	Incumbent Prime Minister (2002–2004) acting during vacancy
—	Lubomír Zaorálek (born 1956)	3 February 2003	7 March 2003	ČSSD	Acting jointly	Incumbent Chairman of the Lower House of Parliament (2002–2006) acting during vacancy
77	Václav Klaus (born 1941)	7 March 2003	7 March 2013	Civic Democratic Party (ODS)	3 (2003)	Minister of Finance of Czechoslovakia (1989–1992), Prime Minister (1992–1998), Chairman of the Lower House of Parliament (1998–2002)
77	Václav Klaus (born 1941)	7 March 2003	7 March 2013	Civic Democratic Party (ODS)	4 (2008)	Minister of Finance of Czechoslovakia (1989–1992), Prime Minister (1992–1998), Chairman of the Lower House of Parliament (1998–2002)
78	Miloš Zeman (born 1944)	8 March 2013	8 March 2023	Party of Civic Rights (SPO)	5 (2013)	Chairman of the Lower House of Parliament (1996–1998), Prime Minister (1998–2002)
78	Miloš Zeman (born 1944)	8 March 2013	8 March 2023	Party of Civic Rights (SPO)	6 (2018)	Chairman of the Lower House of Parliament (1996–1998), Prime Minister (1998–2002)
79	Petr Pavel (born 1961)	9 March 2023	Incumbent	Independent	7 (2023)	Chief of the General Staff (2012–2015); Chairman of the NATO Military Committee (2015–2018)

== See also ==
- List of rulers of Bohemia
- List of presidents of Czechoslovakia
- List of prime ministers of Czechoslovakia
- List of prime ministers of the Czech Socialist Republic
- List of rulers of the Protectorate Bohemia and Moravia
- List of prime ministers of the Czech Republic
- Lists of incumbents
