= List of presidents of Czechoslovakia =

President of Czechoslovakia
- Prezident Československa (Czech); Prezident Česko-Slovenska (Slovak)
- Presidential Standard (1918–1960)

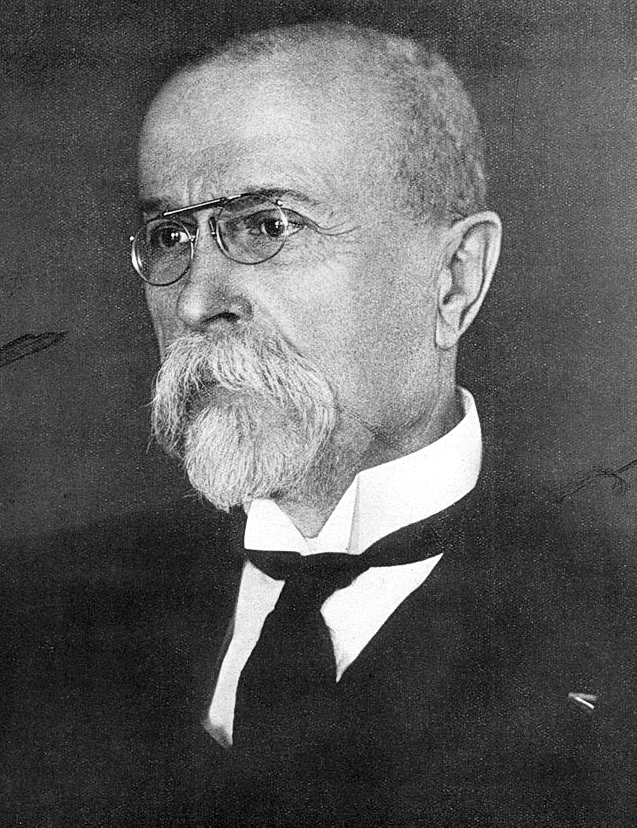
- Longest serving Tomáš Masaryk; 14 November 1918 – 14 December 1935
- Style: His Excellency
- Residence: Prague Castle; Bratislava Castle (1969–92)
- Appointer: Federal Assembly
- Formation: 14 November 1918; 107 years ago
- First holder: Tomáš Masaryk
- Final holder: Václav Havel
- Abolished: 20 July 1992; 34 years ago
- Superseded by: President of the Czech Republic; President of Slovakia
- Deputy: Prime Minister of Czechoslovakia (1948–1992)

The president of Czechoslovakia (Czech: prezident Československa, Slovak: prezident Česko-Slovenska) was the head of state of Czechoslovakia, from the creation of the First Czechoslovak Republic in 1918 until the dissolution of the Czech and Slovak Federative Republic on 1 January 1993.

In periods when the presidency was vacant, most presidential duties were assumed by the prime minister.

The second section lists the leaders of the Communist Party of Czechoslovakia (KSČ) from 1948 to 1989. The post was titled as chairman from 1948 to 1953, first secretary from 1953 to 1971, and general secretary from 1971 to 1989. After the 1948 coup d'état, the KSČ's leader held the real executive power in the country. However, three party leaders (Klement Gottwald, Antonín Novotný, and Gustáv Husák) also served as president at some point in their tenures.

== Presidents of Czechoslovakia (1918–1992) ==
Political parties

Czechoslovak National Socialist Party (ČSNS)
Communist Party of Czechoslovakia (KSČ)
Civic Forum (OF)

Other factions

Independent

No.	Portrait	Name (Birth–Death)	Ethnicity	Election	Term of office			Party
No.	Portrait	Name (Birth–Death)	Ethnicity	Election	Took office	Left office	Time in office	Party
First Czechoslovak Republic (1918–1938)
1		Tomáš Masaryk (1850–1937)	Czech	1918; 1920; 1927; 1934	14 November 1918	14 December 1935	17 years, 30 days	Independent
2		Edvard Beneš (1884–1948)	Czech	1935	18 December 1935	5 October 1938	2 years, 291 days	ČSNS
Second Czechoslovak Republic (1938–1939)
3		Emil Hácha (1872–1945)	Czech	1938	30 November 1938	15 March 1939	105 days	Independent
Occupation (1939–1945); Emil Hácha became State President of the Protectorate of Bohemia and Moravia, a de jure autonomous region incorporated into Nazi Germany. Edvard Beneš proclaimed himself President of the Czechoslovak government-in-exile, the Czechoslovak government recognized by the Allies. Jozef Tiso became President of the quasi-independent, pro-Nazi, and clero-fascist Slovak Republic. Avgustyn Voloshyn became President of Carpatho-Ukraine for a few days before invasion and occupation by the Kingdom of Hungary.
Czechoslovak government-in-exile (1940–1945)
–		Edvard Beneš (1884–1948)	Czech	–	17 October 1939	2 April 1945	5 years, 167 days	ČSNS
Third Czechoslovak Republic (1945–1948)
(2)		Edvard Beneš (1884–1948)	Czech	1946	2 April 1945	7 June 1948	3 years, 66 days	ČSNS
Communist Era (1948–1989) Czechoslovak Republic (1948–1960), Czechoslovak Socialist Republic (1960–1989)
4		Klement Gottwald (1896–1953)	Czech	1948	14 June 1948	14 March 1953	4 years, 273 days	KSČ
5		Antonín Zápotocký (1884–1957)	Czech	1953	21 March 1953	13 November 1957	4 years, 237 days	KSČ
6		Antonín Novotný (1904–1975)	Czech	1957; 1964	19 November 1957	22 March 1968	10 years, 124 days	KSČ
7		Ludvík Svoboda (1895–1979)	Czech	1968; 1973	30 March 1968	29 May 1975	7 years, 60 days	KSČ
8		Gustáv Husák (1913–1991)	Slovak	1975; 1980; 1985	29 May 1975	10 December 1989	14 years, 195 days	KSČ
Post–Communist Era (1989–1992) Czechoslovak Socialist Republic (1989–1990), Czech and Slovak Federative Republic (1990–1992)
9		Václav Havel (1936–2011)	Czech	1989; 1990	29 December 1989	20 July 1992	2 years, 204 days	OF

== General secretaries of the Communist Party of Czechoslovakia (1948–1989) ==
Except for the final office-holder, the leader of the KSČ was de facto the most powerful person in the country during this period.

Title: Chairman (1948–1953); First Secretary (1953–1971)

No.	Portrait	Name (Birth–Death)	Ethnicity	Term of office		
No.	Portrait	Name (Birth–Death)	Ethnicity	Took office	Left office	Time in office
1		Klement Gottwald (1896–1953)	Czech	February 1948	14 March 1953	5 years, 41 days
2		Antonín Novotný (1904–1975)	Czech	14 March 1953	5 January 1968	14 years, 297 days
3		Alexander Dubček (1921–1992)	Slovak	5 January 1968	17 April 1969	1 year, 102 days
4		Gustáv Husák (1913–1991)	Slovak	17 April 1969	17 December 1987	18 years, 244 days
5		Miloš Jakeš (1922–2020)	Czech	17 December 1987	24 November 1989	1 year, 342 days
6		Karel Urbánek (born 1941)	Czech	24 November 1989	20 December 1989	26 days

== Presidential standards ==
1918–1939, 1945–1960

1960–1990

1990–1992

== See also ==
- List of heads of the Czech state
  - List of Bohemian monarchs
  - List of political office-holders in the Protectorate of Bohemia and Moravia
  - List of de facto rulers of the Czechoslovak Socialist Republic
  - List of prime ministers of Czechoslovakia
  - President of the Czech Republic
    - List of presidents of the Czech Republic
  - Prime Minister of the Czech Republic
    - List of prime ministers of the Czech Republic
  - President of Slovakia
  - Prime Minister of Slovakia
- List of Czech presidential pets
