= Štefan Kvietik =

Slovak actor (1936–2025)

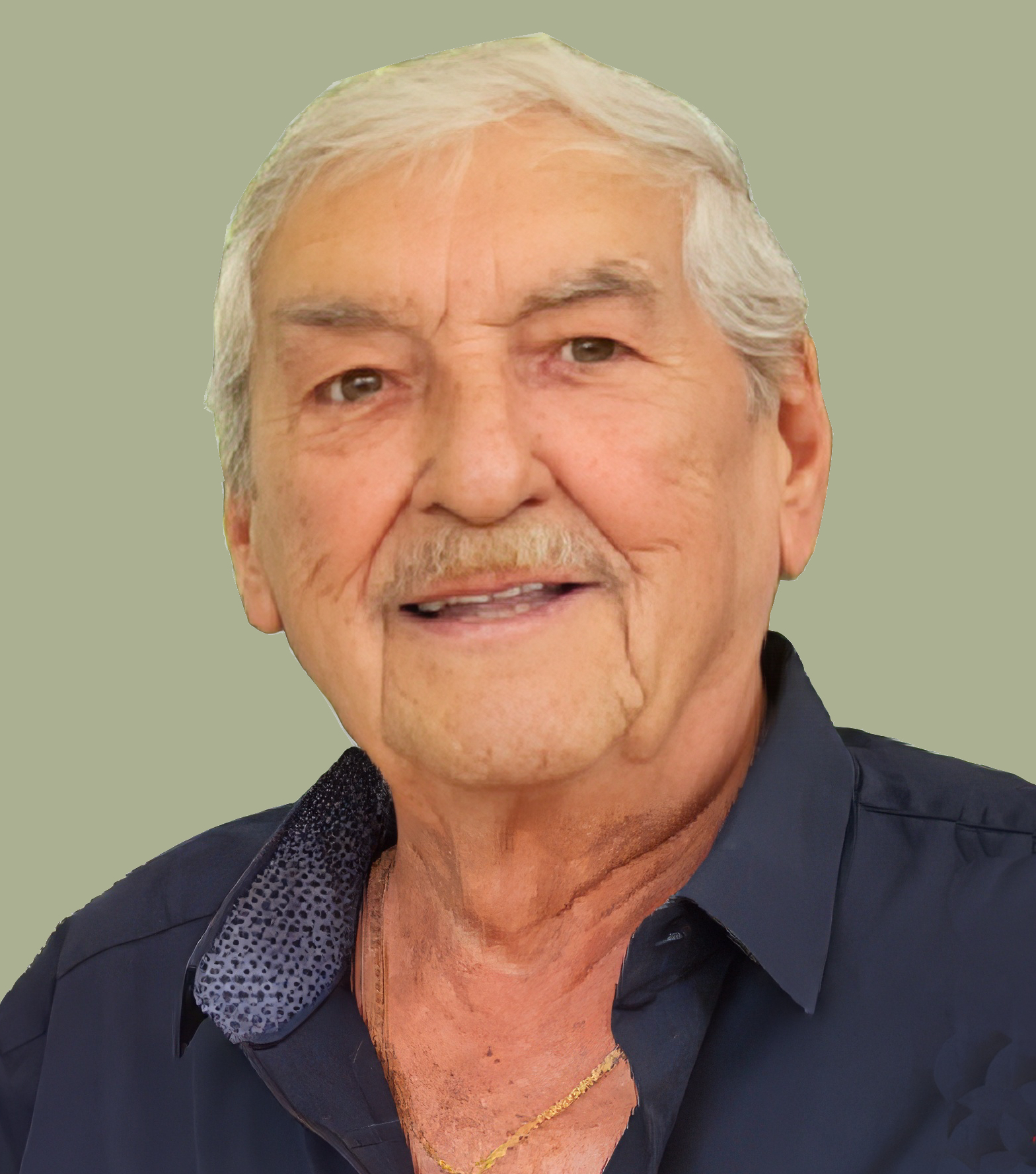
- Kvietik in 2024
- Born: 10 May 1934; Dolné Plachtince, Czechoslovakia
- Died: 21 March 2025 (aged 90)
- Burial place: National Cemetery in Martin
- Education: Academy of Performing Arts in Bratislava
- Occupation: Actor
- Years active: 1957–2007

Štefan Kvietik (10 May 1934 – 21 March 2025) was a Slovak actor and politician.

== Early life ==
Kvietik was born on 10 May 1934 in the village Dolné Plachtince, Czechoslovakia. As a child, he planned to study medicine but eventually decided to follow the example of his parents, who were amateur theatre actors. In 1957, Kvietik graduated in theatre acting from the Academy of Performing Arts in Bratislava. After graduation he shortly acted in the Army theatre in Martin and in 1959 he joined the Slovak National Theatre, where he remained an assembly member for 50 years. Between 1984 and 1990, Kvietik also taught acting at his alma mater, the Academy of Performing Arts.

== Film career ==
Kvietik debuted in the film adaptation of Ladislav Mňačko's television series Death Is Called Engelchen of the Second World War era. Over the course of his career, he appeared in over 40 films, including The Boxer and Death, The Millennial Bee, and Sitting on a Branch, Enjoying Myself. His final role was in the 1997 television series Camp of Fallen Women.

== Political career ==
Between 1990 and 1994, Kvietik was a member of the National Council of Slovakia for the Slovak National Party.

In 1990, the Slovak National Party considered Kvietik as a candidate for president of Czechoslovakia, but Kvietik refused to run.

== Death ==
Kvietik died on 21 March 2025, at the age of 90. He is buried at the National Cemetery in Martin.

== Awards ==
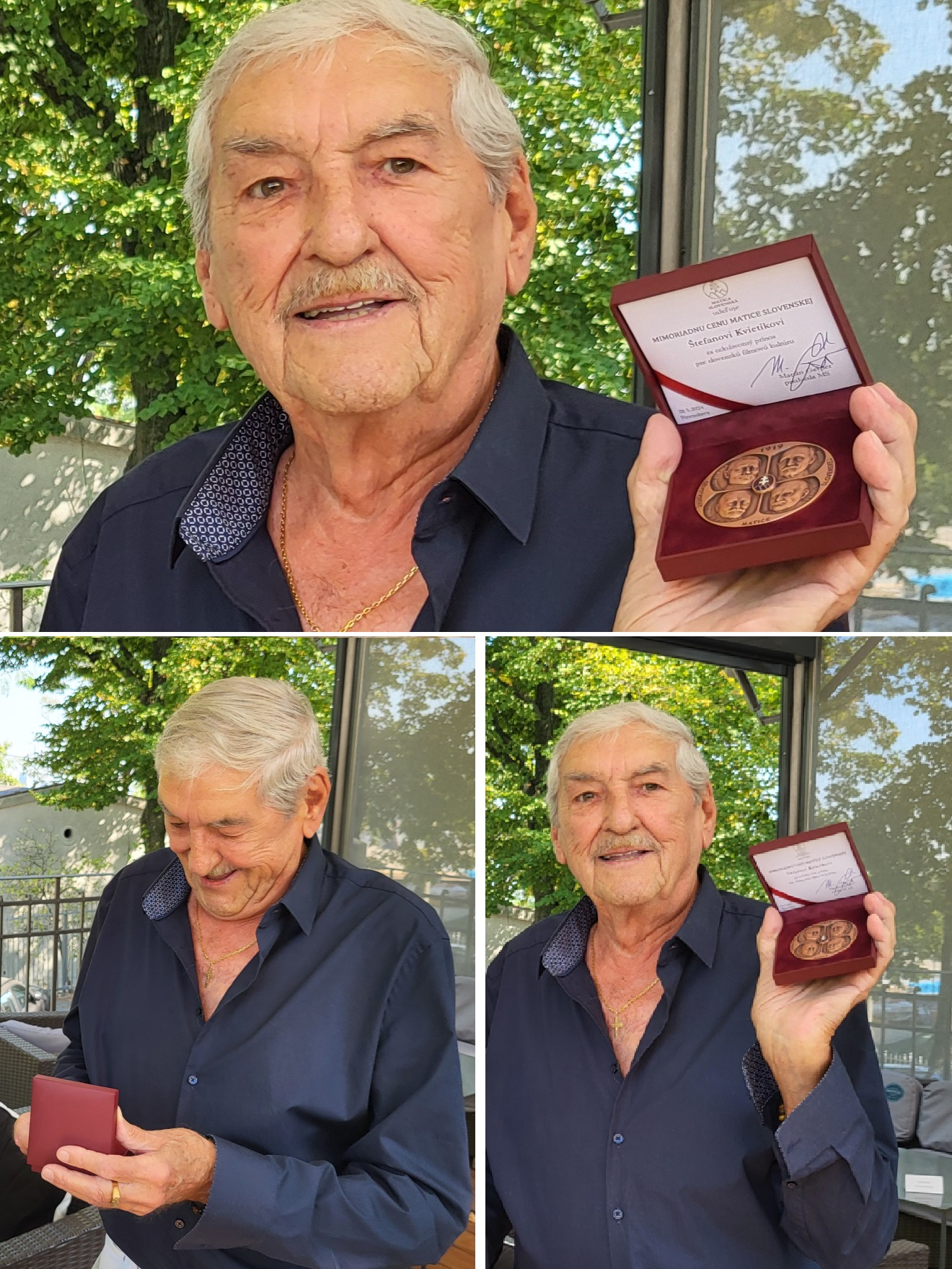
Štefan Kvietik with the Slovak Matica Award for Lifetime Contribution to Slovak Film Culture

Kvietik was awarded the Order of Ľudovít Štúr, 2nd class in 2004 by the president of Slovakia Ivan Gašparovič. In 2009, he was introduced to the OTO Hall of Fame. On the occasion of the 90th anniversary, he was awarded the Slovak Matica Special Award for his lifelong contribution to Slovak film culture.
