= Bożena =

- Pronunciation: Polish pronunciation: [bɔˈʐɛna]
- Gender: female

Origin
- Meaning: derived from God
- Region of origin: Poland

Other names
- Related names: Božena

Bożena (Polish pronunciation: [bɔˈʐɛna]) is a Polish feminine given name, originally appearing as Bożana and Bożechna. It is derived from the word "Bóg" (God).

This Slavic name is equivalent to Božena in Czech, Slovak and other Slavic languages.

Individuals named Bożena may celebrate their name day on 13 March, 20 June or 27 July (in Slovakia).

Notable people with this name include:

- Bożenna Bukiewicz (born 1952), Polish politician
- Bożena Dykiel (1948–2026), Polish actress
- Bozenna Intrator (born 1964), Polish-American writer, lyricist and translator

== See also ==
- Polish name
- Slavic names
