= 1992 Czechoslovak presidential election =

- 3 July to 3 October 1992
President before election
Václav Havel
Elected President
None

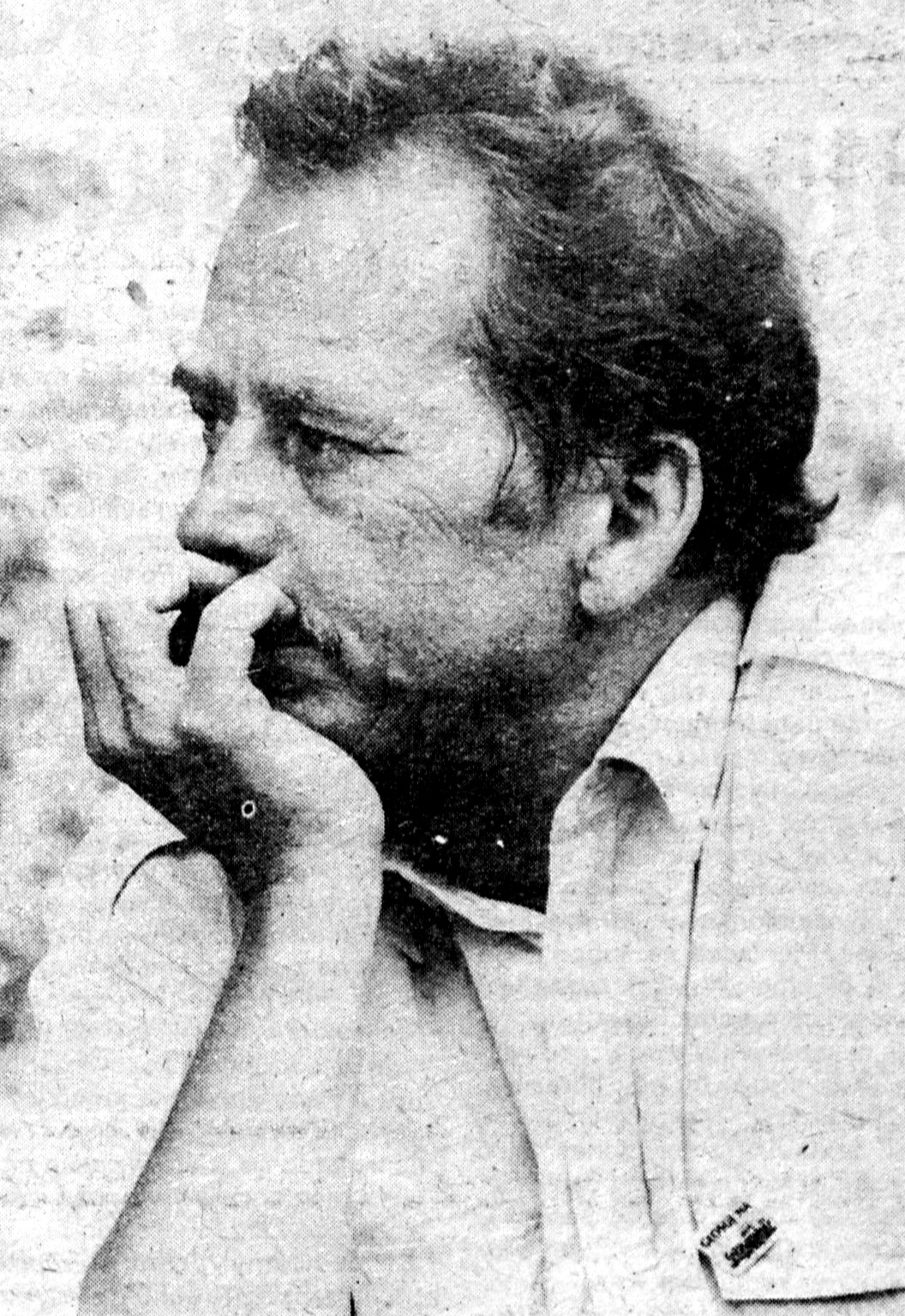
Václav Havel, incumbent president during the election

The 1992 Czechoslovak presidential election was held from July to October 1992, but parliament failed to elect a new president, foreshadowing the breakup of Czechoslovakia. Incumbent President Václav Havel participated in the first ballot held on 3 July 1992. He ran unopposed but failed to receive enough votes from Slovak MPs to be re-elected. Havel resigned on 17 July due to his failure.

== Result ==
Candidate	Party	1st ballot		2nd ballot		3rd ballot		4th ballot
Candidate	Party	1st round	2nd round	1st round	2nd round	1st round	2nd round	4th ballot
Václav Havel	Independent	SL:79; SN:69	SL:80; SN:63	N/A		N/A		N/A
Miroslav Sládek	Rally for the Republic – Republican Party of Czechoslovakia	N/A		SL:32; SN:26	SL:33; SN:27	N/A		N/A
Zdeněk Viktor Procházka	Rally for the Republic – Republican Party of Czechoslovakia	N/A		N/A		SL:4; SN:3	SL:5; SN:0	N/A
Zdeněk Pinta	Rally for the Republic – Republican Party of Czechoslovakia	N/A		N/A		SL:4; SN:4	SL:1; SN:2	N/A
Marie Kristková	Liberal-Social Union	N/A		N/A		SL:29; SN:36	SL:33; SN:37	N/A
Jiří Kotas	Liberal-Social Union	N/A		N/A		N/A		SL:16; SN:24
