= Dolné Plachtince =

Dolné Plachtince Alsópalojta
- Municipality
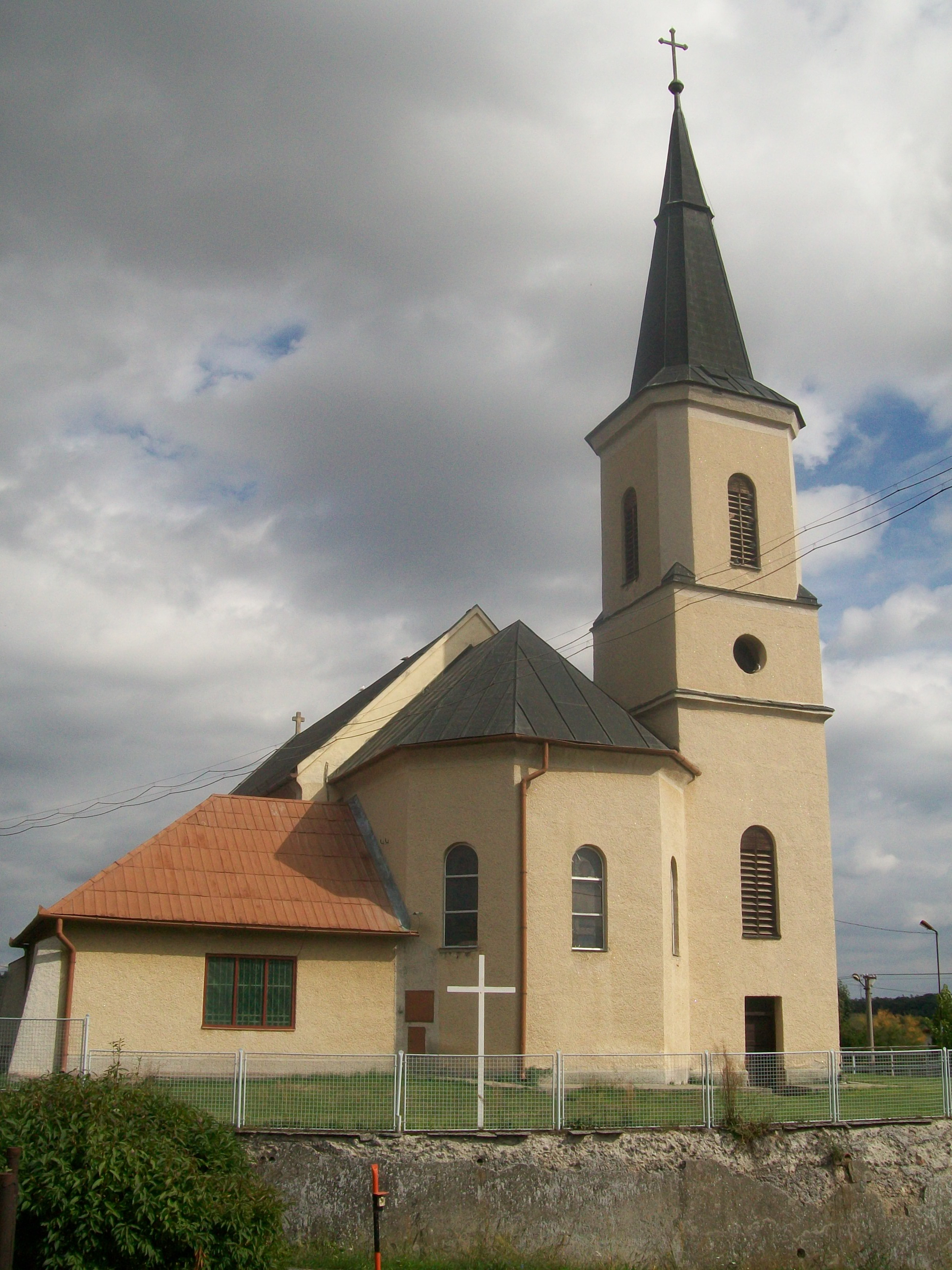
- St. Martin's Church

- Flag

- Location of Dolné Plachtince in the Banská Bystrica Region Location of Dolné Plachtince in Slovakia
- Coordinates: 48.20°N 19.32°E
- Country: Slovakia
- Region: Banská Bystrica Region
- District: Veľký Krtíš District
- First mentioned: 1337

Area
  - Total: 9.88 km^{2} (3.81 sq mi)
- Elevation: 203 m (666 ft)

Population (2025)
  - Total: 593
- Time zone: UTC+1 (CET)
  - Summer (DST): UTC+2 (CEST)
- Postal code: 991 24
- Area code: +421 47
- Vehicle registration plate (until 2022): VK
- Website: www.dolneplachtince.sk/wp/

Dolné Plachtince (Hungarian: Alsópalojta) is a village and municipality in the Veľký Krtíš District of the Banská Bystrica Region of southern Slovakia.

== Geography ==
The municipality lies at an altitude of 203 metres (666 ft) and covers an area of 9.88 km^{2} (3.81 sq mi) (2025).

== History ==
In historical records, the village was first mentioned in 1337 (Palahta Inferior). It belonged to nobles Dacsoy, Lukay and Simonfy. In 1776 it passed to ecclesiastical Rožňava’s Capitol.

== Population ==
Population statistic (10 years)
Year	1995	2005	2015	2025
Count	551	606	635	593
Difference		+9.98%	+4.78%	−6.61%

Population statistic
Year	2024	2025
Count	596	593
Difference		−0.50%

It has a population of 593 people (31 December 2025).

=== Ethnicity ===
Census 2021 (1+ %)
Ethnicity	Number	Fraction
Slovak	530	87.89%
Not found out	63	10.44%
Romani	11	1.82%
Hungarian	10	1.65%
Total	603	

In year 2021 was 603 people by ethnicity 530 as Slovak, 63 as Not found out, 11 as Romani, 10 as Hungarian, 4 as German, 4 as Other and 1 as Ukrainian.

Note on population: The difference values of population numbers in the table "Population statistic" and in the sections "Ethnicity" & "Religion" is caused by the use of various statistical methods.

=== Religion ===
Census 2021 (1+ %)
Religion	Number	Fraction
Roman Catholic Church	375	62.19%
None	86	14.26%
Evangelical Church	66	10.95%
Not found out	61	10.12%
Greek Catholic Church	9	1.49%
Total	603	

In year 2021 was 603 people by religion 375 from Roman Catholic Church, 86 from None, 66 from Evangelical Church, 61 from Not found out, 9 from Greek Catholic Church, 1 from Old Catholic Church, 1 from Eastern Orthodox Church, 1 from Other and not ascertained christian church, 1 from Christian Congregations in Slovakia, 1 from Other and 1 from Ad hoc movements.

== Genealogical resources ==
The records for genealogical research are available at the state archive "Statny Archiv in Banska Bystrica, Slovakia"

- Roman Catholic church records (births/marriages/deaths): 1689-1900 (parish A)
- Lutheran church records (births/marriages/deaths): 1712-1936 (parish B)

== Notable people ==
- Štefan Kvietik (1936–2025), actor

== See also ==
- List of municipalities and towns in Slovakia
