= List of Czech presidential pets =

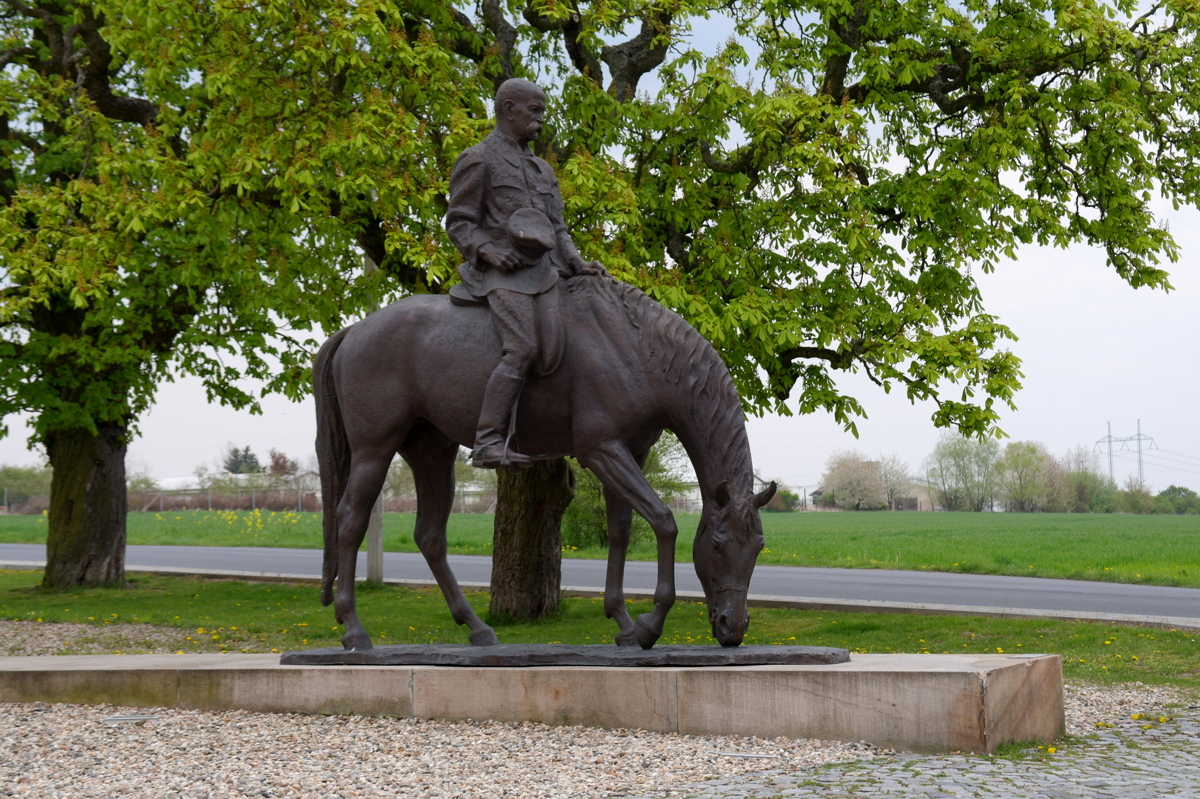
Equestrian statue of President Tomáš Garrigue Masaryk on his horse Hektor in Lány, completed in 2010

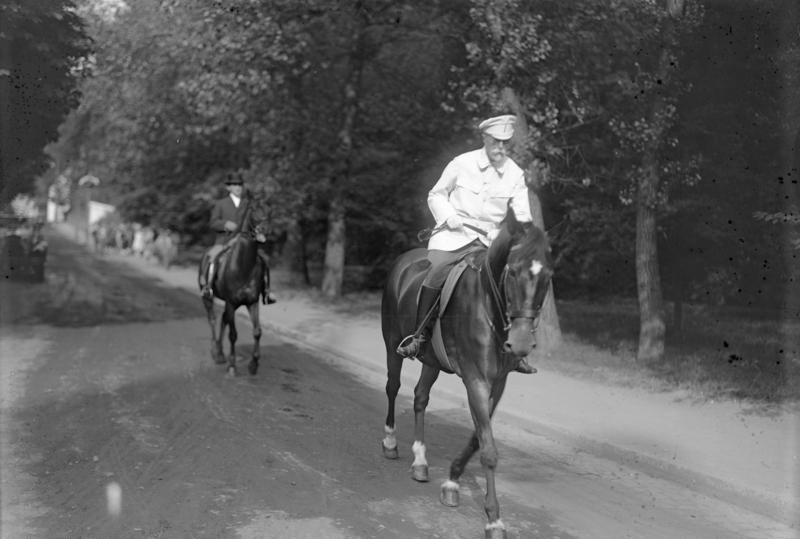
Tomáš Garrigue Masaryk on his horse Hektor in 1931

Presidents of the Czech Republic and their predecessors as Presidents of Czechoslovakia have often kept pets while in office.

In addition to traditional pets, this list includes some animals normally considered livestock or working animals that have a close association with presidents or their families; occasionally the animals were given to the presidents from foreign dignitaries.

== List of presidential pets ==
President	Pets
Czechoslovakia (1918–1992)
Tomáš Garrigue Masaryk	Hektor (1906–1933) – mounted police horse; Bayard – mounted police horse
Edvard Beneš	Jerry – Airedale Terrier; Imru – Airedale Terrier; Toga – German Shepherd; Bojek – German Shepherd, relative of Blondi, from František Czerny's dog breeding in Kravaře
Emil Hácha	
Klement Gottwald	
Antonín Zápotocký	Astor – German Shepherd border guard dog
Antonín Novotný	
Ludvík Svoboda	German Shepherd
Gustáv Husák	
Václav Havel	Ďula (1991–2002) – Standard Schnauzer
Czech Republic (from 1993)
Václav Havel	Ďula (1991–2002) – Standard Schnauzer; Sugar – Boxer; Madla – Boxer
Václav Klaus	
Miloš Zeman	Darcy – Golden Retriever
Petr Pavel	Micka – cat

== See also ==
- United States presidential pets
- List of Taiwanese presidential pets
