= 1968 Czechoslovak presidential election =

- 30 March 1968
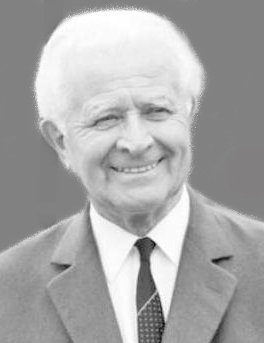

Nominee	Ludvík Svoboda	Abstain
Party	KSČ
Electoral vote	282	6
Percentage	97.6%	2.1%
President before election
Antonín Novotný
KSČ
Elected President
Ludvík Svoboda
KSČ

The 1968 Czechoslovak presidential election took place on 30 March 1968. Ludvík Svoboda replaced Antonín Novotný as the President of Czechoslovakia. It was the only time during Communist regime that the elected president didn't receive 100% of votes.

== Background ==
The election was held as a result of Novotný's resignation during Prague Spring. Discussions about his successor started. The reformist wing of the Communist Party of Czechoslovakia wanted an independent candidate and nominated Josef Charvát while others supported Ludvík Svoboda. Another suggested candidate was Čestmír Císař who was supported by students. It was eventually decided that Svoboda will be the only candidate in the election.

== Voting ==
Candidate	Votes	%
Ludvík Svoboda	282	97.58
Abstain	6	2.08
Blank votes	1	0.35

The election was held on 30 March 1968. 288 MPs participated. Svoboda received 282 votes and became the new president.
