= Čestmír Císař =

Czech politician and diplomat

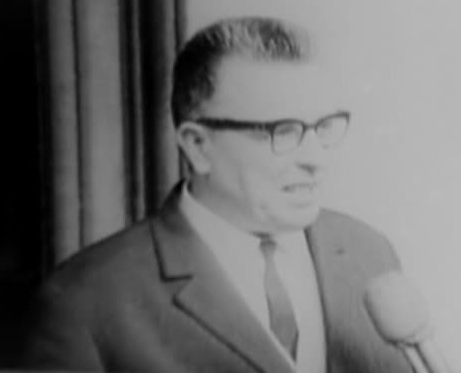
Císař in 1968

Čestmír Císař (2 January 1920 – 24 March 2013) was a Czech politician and diplomat. He served as the first Chairman of the Czech National Council from 1968 to 1969 when the Czech Republic was part of Czechoslovakia during the Communist era. A leading advocate for reforms of the Communist Party, Císař introduced a series of liberal reforms to Communist Czechoslovakia, becoming a major figure in the Prague Spring as a result. He sought to create a new form of socialism with a "human face." His reforms were repealed following the 1968 Warsaw Pact invasion of Czechoslovakia. He was removed from office and expelled from the Communist Party until the Velvet Revolution of 1989.

== Life and career ==
Císař was born in Hostomice nad Bílinou on 2 January 1920. He studied at Lycée Carnot in Dijon, France. He attended Charles University in Prague but was forced to leave the school following the German occupation of Czechoslovakia in 1939. He worked as an accountant during the Nazi occupation and World War II.

He joined the Communist Party of Czechoslovakia (KSČ) in 1945 following the end of the war. Císař first became involved in the Communist Party's cultural programs in the western city of Plzeň.

Císař served as the department head and Secretary of the KSČ regional committee in Plzeň from 1952 to 1957. He next held the post Secretary of the Central Committee of the KSČ during the early 1960s.

He served as the country's Minister of Culture and Education of Czechoslovakia from 1963 to 1965. However, he soon angered leaders within the Communist Party (KSČ) for openly expressing liberal viewpoints. Antonín Novotný, the President of Czechoslovakia and head of the KSČ, accused Císař of "dabbling too much with intellectuals." Novotný removed from the ministry in 1965 and sent him out of the country as the ambassador of Czechoslovakia to Romania as a punishment.

Antonín Novotný resigned as First Secretary of the Presidium of the Central Committee of the KSČ in January 1968 and was replaced by Alexander Dubček. Císař returned to Czechoslovakia from Romania at the behest of Dubček.

Císař was one of several candidates within the Communist Party who campaigned for President of Czechoslovakia in the aftermath of Novotný's resignation from this office in March. He received widespread support from Czechoslovak university students, as well as the support of Dubček in the KSČ election. However, Communist Party members chose General Ludvík Svoboda as the new President and head of the KSČ instead of Císař.

He became the Chairman of the Czech National Council in 1968, holding the office during the Prague Spring. Císař introduced a series of liberal reforms within the Communist system and he became a symbol of the Prague Spring.

Císař attempted to halt the 1968 Soviet invasion which ended the Prague Spring. He was removed from office and expelled from the Communist Party (KSČ) in the aftermath of the invasion. He left politics and public life after his removal from office, taking small jobs for a living.

He remained out of politics until the end of the Communist era in 1989. He briefly founded the Obroda group in 1989, a small group of reformed Communist veterans of the Prague Spring who advocated "democratic socialism" in the wake of the Velvet Revolution. However, the group was opposed by Václav Havel and it soon disbanded.

Císař returned to his former career as a diplomat in the 1990s in an agreement with Václav Havel. He served as the representative of Czechoslovakia to the Council of Europe from 1991 to 1992.

Císař focused on his writings during the 1990s and 2000s. In 2013, he attended a victory party to celebrate the election of Miloš Zeman as President of the Czech Republic.

Čestmír Císař died on 24 March 2013 in Prague, at the age of 93.

== Publications ==
- Císař, Čestmír (1998). Člověk a politik: kniha vzpomínek a úvah. Profily generace (Vyd. 1 ed.). Praha: ETC Publ. ISBN 978-80-86006-59-8.
- Císař, Čestmír (2006). Moji českoslovenští presidenti (1. vyd ed.). Praha: Slávy Dcera. ISBN 978-80-903725-0-4.
- Císař, Čestmír (2005). Paměti: nejen o zákulisí Pražského jara. Praha: SinCon. ISBN 978-80-239-5900-0.
