= Bożenna Bukiewicz =

Polish politician (born 1952)

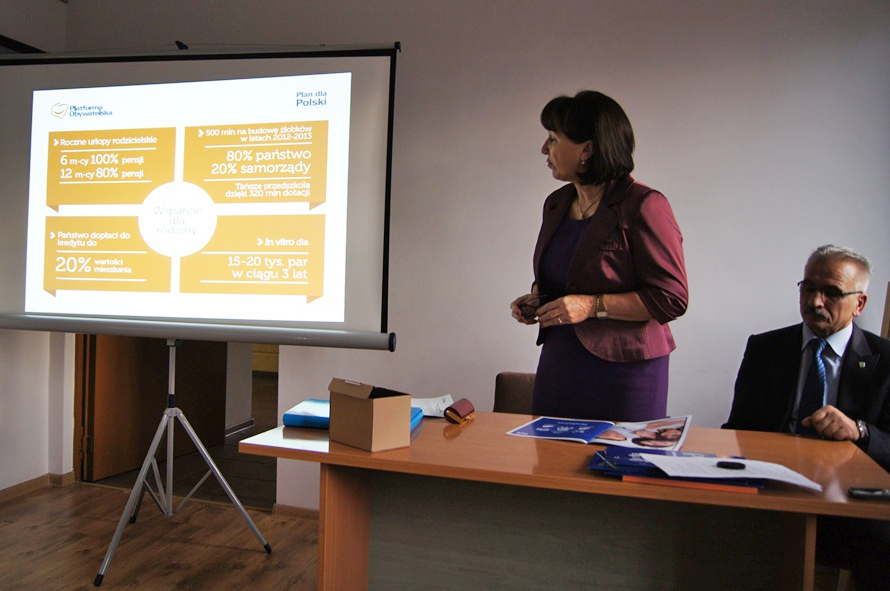

member of Sejm 2005–2007
- Incumbent
- Assumed office 25 September 2005

Personal details
- Born: 1952 (age 73–74)
- Party: Civic Platform

Bożenna Bukiewicz, née Lickiewicz [bɔˈʐɛnna buˈkjɛwʲit͡ʂ] (born 14 February 1952 in Żary) is a Polish politician. She was elected to the Sejm on 25 September 2005 getting 11,237 votes in 8 Zielona Góra district as a candidate from the Civic Platform list.

== See also ==
- Members of Polish Sejm 2005–2007
