= 1935 Czechoslovak presidential election =

- 18 December 1935
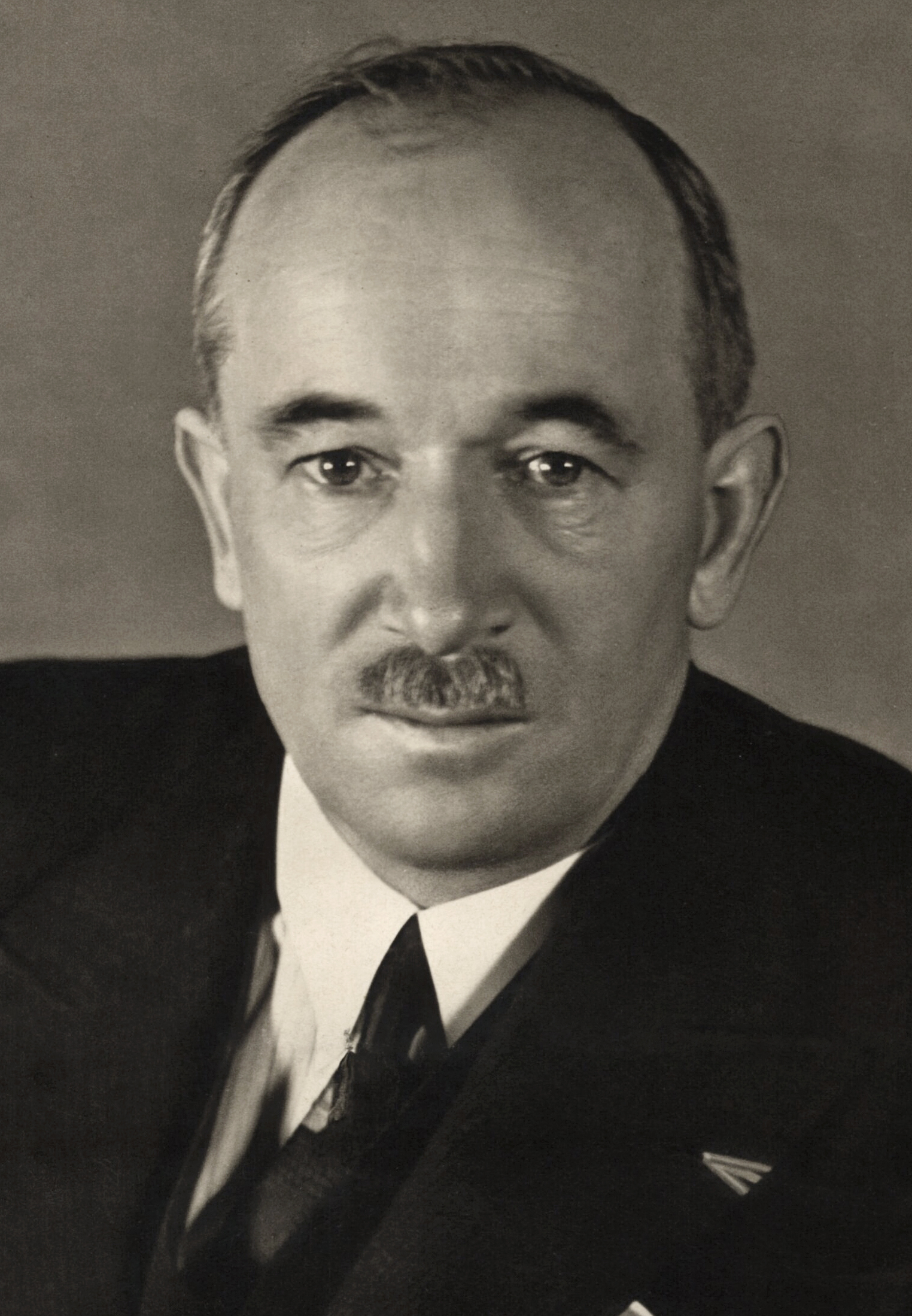

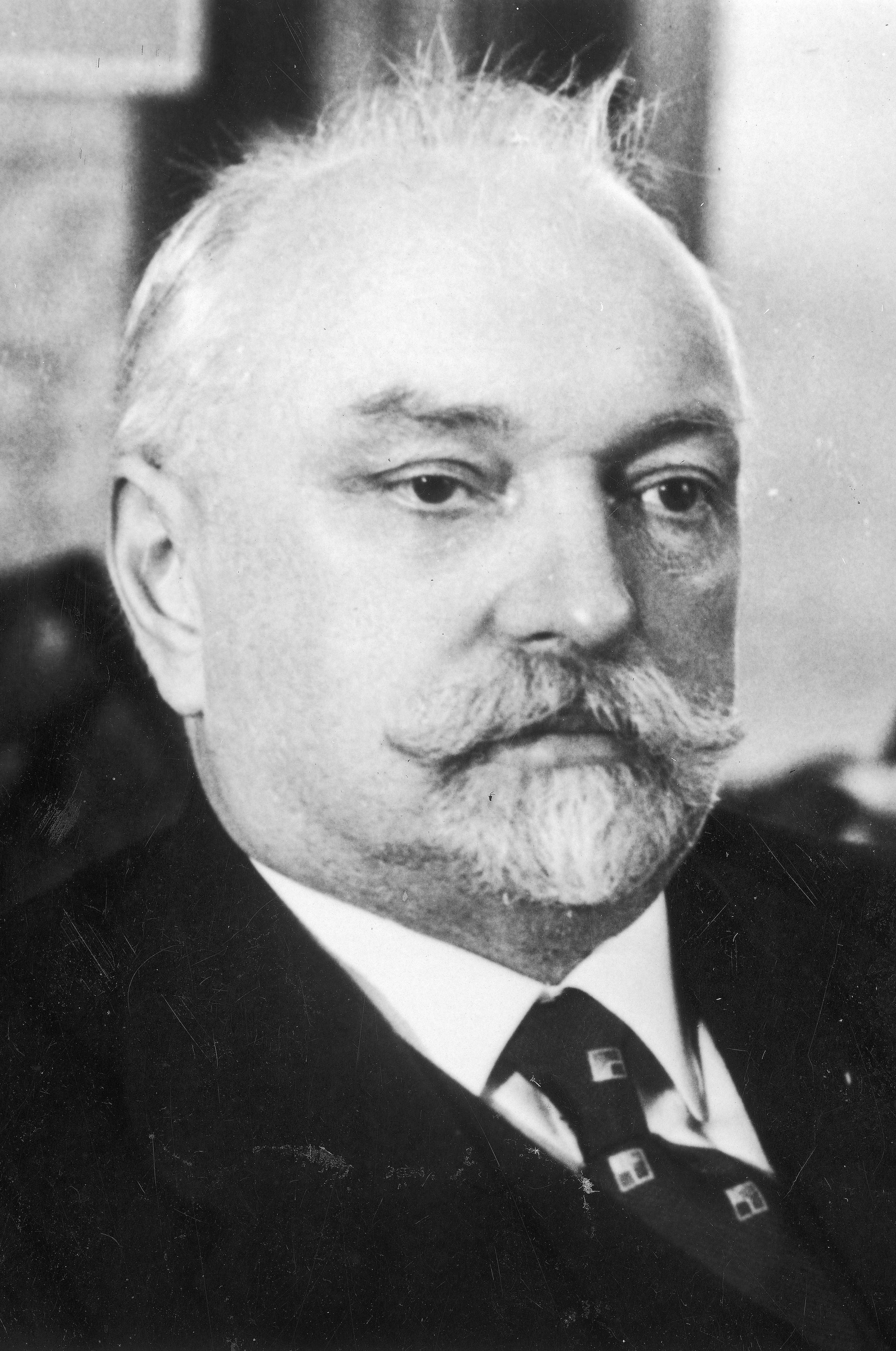
Nominee	Edvard Beneš	Bohumil Němec
Party	ČSNS	RSZML
Electoral vote	340	24
Percentage	77.3%	5.5%
President before election
Milan Hodža (acting)
RSZML
Elected President
Edvard Beneš
ČSNS

The 1935 Czechoslovak presidential election took place on 18 December 1935. Edvard Beneš was elected the second President of Czechoslovakia and replaced Tomáš Garrigue Masaryk. Beneš's victory was considered unlikely due to lack of support in a parliament but negotiations helped him to win much larger support than Masaryk has ever received.

== Background ==
Edvard Beneš was considered Masaryk's successor since 1918. His candidacy in the 1934 election was opposed by the Republican Party of Farmers and Peasants and the large party of Social Democrats and Tomáš Garrigue Masaryk decided to run for his fourth term. He was reelected on 1934. The 1935 parliamentary election resulted in the success of the Sudeten German Party (SdP). SdP remained in opposition and Milan Hodža eventually became the new Prime Minister. Tomáš Garrigue Masaryk decided to resign on his position due to his poor health. Hodža wanted to postpone Masaryk's resignation but agreed that he will support Beneš. Beneš's candidacy was supported by National socialists, Social Democrats and Populars. Republicans and Traders opposed it and wanted Masaryk to remain president.

== Campaign ==
=== Negotiations ===
The leader of Republicans Rudolf Beran tried to persuade Masaryk to not resign but Masaryk declined. The Republicans decided to not support Beneš and started to look for their own candidate. Bohumil Němec was eventually nominated as the party's candidate. He quickly received support of Czechoslovak Traders' Party and Hlinka's Slovak People's Party. Beneš managed to receive support of National socialists and Social Democrats. Němec was then endorsed by National Unification and the National Fascist Community. Hodža resigned due to his failure to find support for Beneš but Masaryk didn't accept it. Masaryk resigned on 14 December 1935. He suggested Beneš as the new president.

Beran tried to convince the Sudeten German Party to vote against Beneš but failed. Beneš on the other hand convinced Hlinka's Slovak People's Party to support him. Beran eventually agreed to negotiate with Beneš. Němec withdrew from election on 17 December 1935 and Republican Party of Farmers and Peasants agreed to support Beneš. Beneš also received indirect support from the Communist Party of Czechoslovakia on 17 December 1935.

=== Press campaign ===
The right wing and nationalist press led a campaign against Beneš. Parties used their own newspapers for the campaign. The Republicans tried to persuade people that Němec is the only candidate who can be the President of all. The National Unification was strictly against Beneš and tried to undermine Beneš's image of the national candidate. The National Socialists and Social Democrats used their newspapers to support Beneš. Populars eventually supported Beneš due to Masaryk's wish. The Communists supported Beneš because Němec was supported by Fascist parties.

== Procedure ==
The president was elected by a bicameral parliament that consisted of 300 Deputies and 150 Senators. A candidate needed 60% of votes to be elected.

== Candidates ==
- Edvard Beneš, supported by the Czechoslovak National Socialist Party, Czechoslovak Social Democratic Workers' Party, Czechoslovak People's Party and Communist Party of Czechoslovakia.
- Bohumil Němec, supported by the Republican Party of Farmers and Peasants, Czechoslovak Traders' Party and National Unification. He withdrew from election on 17 December 1935.

== Voting ==
Candidate	Party	Votes	%
Edvard Beneš	Czechoslovak National Socialist Party	340	77.27
Blank votes		76	17.27
Bohumil Němec	Republican Party of Farmers and Peasants	24	5.45
Total		440	100.00
Total votes		440	–
Registered voters/turnout		450	97.78

Voting was held on 18 December 1935. 440 electors participated in the election. Beneš received 340 votes while 76 votes were blank. 24 electors voted for Němec despite his withdrawal from election. Beneš's support was unexpectedly high.

== Aftermath ==
Beneš became second president of Czechoslovakia. He led Czechoslovakia until 1938 when he had to leave Czechoslovakia due to World War II and formed the Czechoslovak government-in-exile. He became the leader of the resistance to Nazi Germany and returned to his position as the president of Czechoslovakia when the country was liberated. He resigned in 1948 due to the 1948 coup d'état.
