= Božena =

Božena is a feminine given name. Notable people with the name include:

- Božena (Křesinová), Bohemian duchess
- Božena of Bohemia, Bohemian princess and Margravine of Brandenburg
- Božena Angelova, Slovenian violinist
- Božena Dobešová, Czech gymnast
- Božena Komárková, Czech philosopher
- Božena Laglerová, Czech aviator
- Božena Němcová, Czech writer
- Božena Slančíková-Timrava, Slovak writer
- Božena Srncová, Czech gymnast

== See also ==
- Bożena
