= 1985 Czechoslovak presidential election =

Presidential election

← 1980	22 May 1985	1989 →
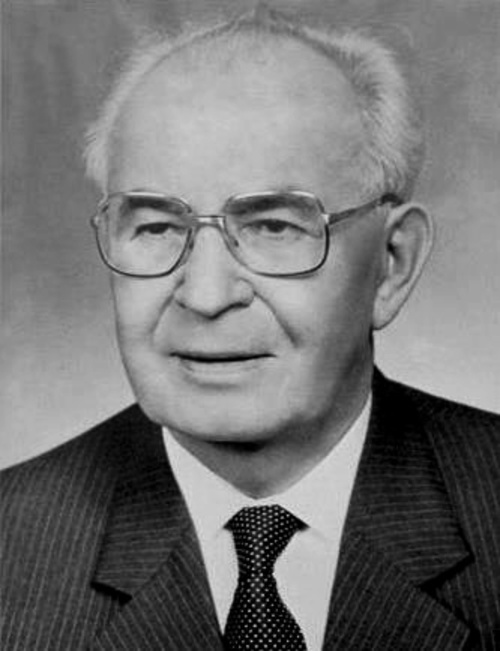
Nominee	Gustáv Husák
Party	KSČ
Electoral vote	344
Percentage	100%
President before election
Gustáv Husák
KSČ
Elected President
Gustáv Husák
KSČ

The 1985 Czechoslovak presidential election took place on 22 May 1985. Gustáv Husák was re-elected for his third term and remained in the office until 1989 when he resigned as a result of the Velvet Revolution. Husák was the only candidate.
