= 1980 Czechoslovak presidential election =

Czechoslovakia presidential election in May 1980

← 1975	22 May 1980	1985 →
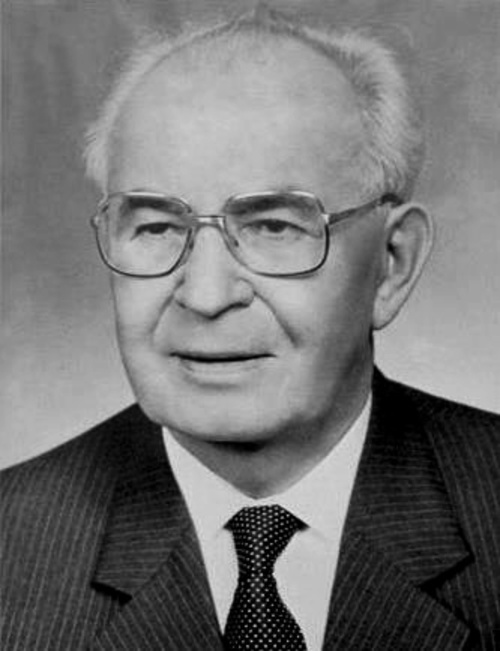
Nominee	Gustáv Husák
Party	KSČ
Electoral vote	343
Percentage	100%
President before election
Gustáv Husák
KSČ
Elected President
Gustáv Husák
KSČ

The 1980 Czechoslovak presidential election was carried out on 22 May 1980 by the deputies of the two houses of the nation's parliament, the Federal Assembly, rather than by popular vote. Gustáv Husák was re-elected for his second term. Husák was the only candidate considered in the joint session, and received a 343 to 0 approval from the 150 member House of the Nations (which consisted of 75 Czech and 75 Slovak deputies) and the 200 member House of the People.
