= 1920 Czechoslovak presidential election =

- 27 May 1920
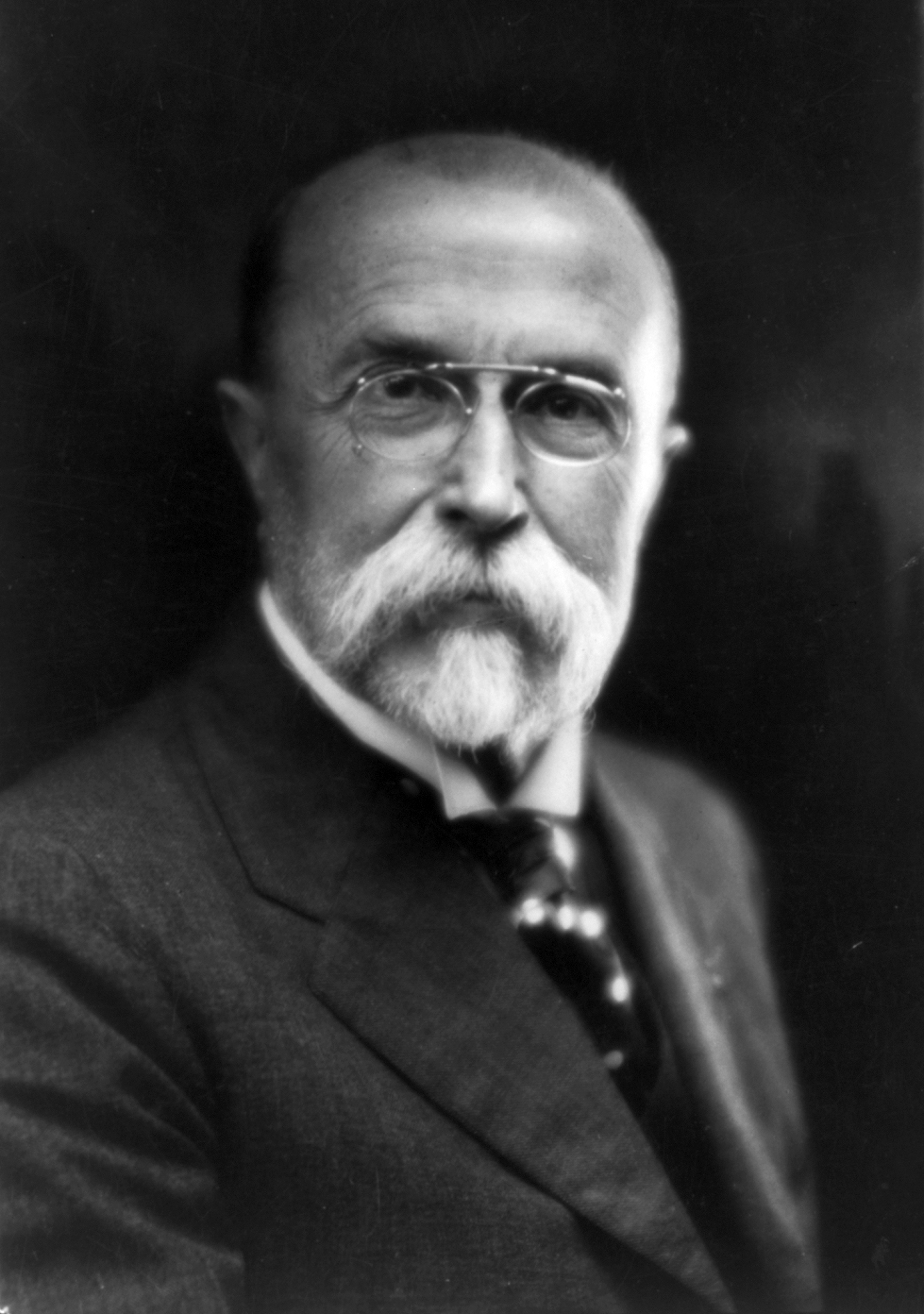

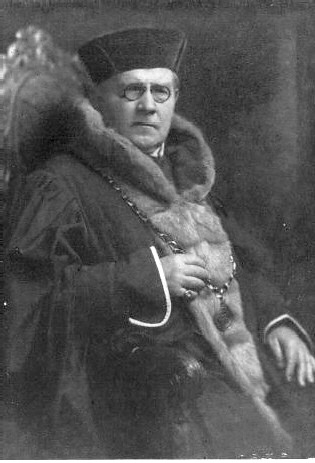
Nominee	Tomáš Garrigue Masaryk	August Naegle
Party	Independent	DNP
Electoral vote	284	61
Percentage	67.1%	14.4%
President before election
Tomáš Garrigue Masaryk
Independent
Elected President
Tomáš Garrigue Masaryk
Independent

The 1920 Czechoslovak presidential election took place on 27 May 1920. It was the first contested presidential election. Tomáš Garrigue Masaryk has won his second term against German theologian August Naegle.

== Procedure ==
President was elected by bicameral parliament that consisted of 281 Deputies and 142 Senators. Candidate needed at least 247 votes to be elected.

== Candidates ==
- Tomáš Garrigue Masaryk, the incumbent president and a candidate of governing coalition.
- August Naegle, candidate of German minority.

There were also two names written on protest ballot: Alois Muna, candidate of left fraction of social democrats (later Communist) and Antonín Janoušek, Communist radical, former leader of Slovak Soviet Republic.

== Election ==
Masaryk received 284 votes and was elected for his second term.
