= 1938 Czechoslovak presidential election =

- 30 November 1938
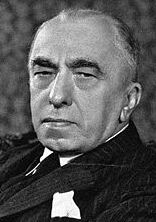
Nominee	Emil Hácha
Party	Independent
Electoral vote	272
Percentage	87.2%
President before election
Edvard Beneš
ČSNS
Elected President
Emil Hácha
Independent

The 1938 Czechoslovak presidential election took place on 30 November 1938. The election was held following the Munich Agreement. Edvard Beneš resigned on his position and Emil Hácha became the new president.

== Voting ==
312 members of parliament voted. Hácha received 272 votes while 39 were blank.
