= 1953 Czechoslovak presidential election =

- 21 March 1953
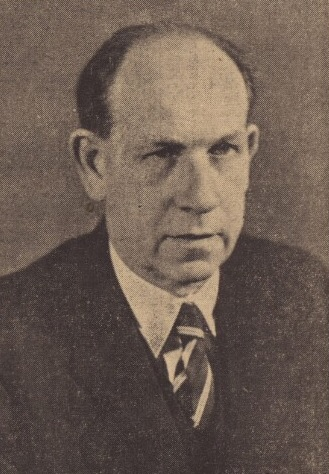
Nominee	Antonín Zápotocký
Party	KSČ
Electoral vote	271
Percentage	100%
President before election
Klement Gottwald
KSČ
Elected President
Antonín Zápotocký
KSČ

The 1953 Czechoslovak presidential election took place on 21 March 1953. It was held due to the death of Klement Gottwald. Prime Minister Antonín Zápotocký was elected the new president.

== Voting ==
Klement Gottwald died on 14 March 1953. At the 14 June election, Zápotocký received all 271 votes in the Parliament. He had already been carrying out most presidential duties since Gottwald's death, as per the Constitution.
