= 1973 Czechoslovak presidential election =

- 22 March 1973
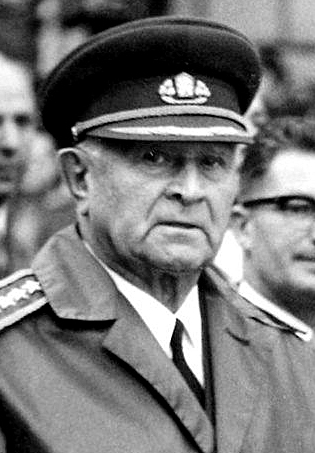
Nominee	Ludvík Svoboda
Party	KSČ
Electoral vote	341
Percentage	100%
President before election
Ludvík Svoboda
KSČ
Elected President
Ludvík Svoboda
KSČ

The 1973 Czechoslovak presidential election took place on 22 March 1973. Ludvík Svoboda was elected for his second term.

== Background ==
Svoboda was the president since 1968. His first term expired in 1973. He was nominated as the only candidate.
