= 1934 Czechoslovak presidential election =

- 24 May 1934
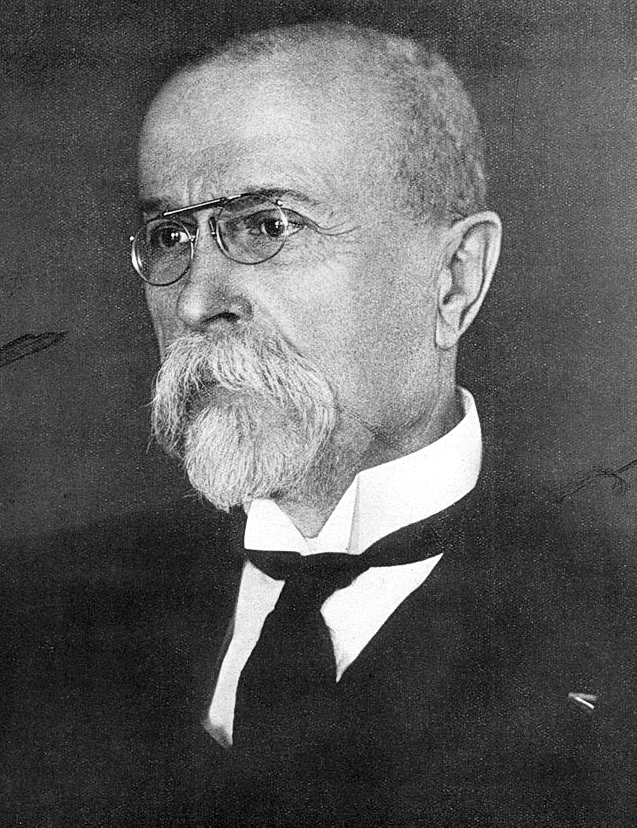

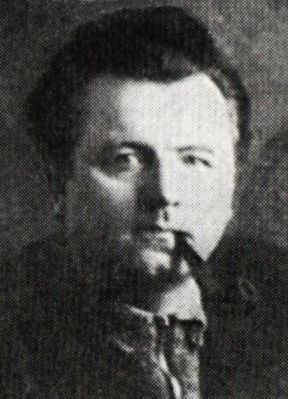
Nominee	Tomáš Garrigue Masaryk	Klement Gottwald
Party	Independent	KSČ
Electoral vote	327	38
Percentage	78.2%	9.1%
President before election
Tomáš Garrigue Masaryk
Independent
Elected President
Tomáš Garrigue Masaryk
Independent

The 1934 Czechoslovak presidential election took place on 24 May 1934. Tomáš Garrigue Masaryk was elected for his fourth term.

== Background ==
Tomáš Garrigue Masaryk was 84 years old when his third term concluded. He wanted Edvard Beneš to become his successor but Beneš didn't have required support and Masaryk decided to run instead of him. Masaryk had to deal with poor health and suffered a stroke prior to election. Communist Party of Czechoslovakia nominated Klement Gottwald as its candidate; he would later go on to serve as president between 1948 and 1953, following the coup in 1948.

== Procedure ==
President was elected by bicameral parliament that consisted of 300 Deputies and 150 Senators. Candidate needed 60% of votes to be elected.

== Voting ==
Candidate	Party	Votes	%
Tomáš Garrigue Masaryk	Independent	327	78.23
Blank votes		53	12.68
Klement Gottwald	Communist Party of Czechoslovakia	38	9.09
Total		418	100.00
Total votes		418	–
Registered voters/turnout		450	92.89

418 electors voted. Masaryk received 327 votes while Gottwald received 38 votes. 53 Ballots were blank.

== Aftermath ==
Masaryk resigned on 14 December 1935 and Edvard Beneš was elected his successor.
