= 1990 Czechoslovak presidential election =

- 5 July 1990
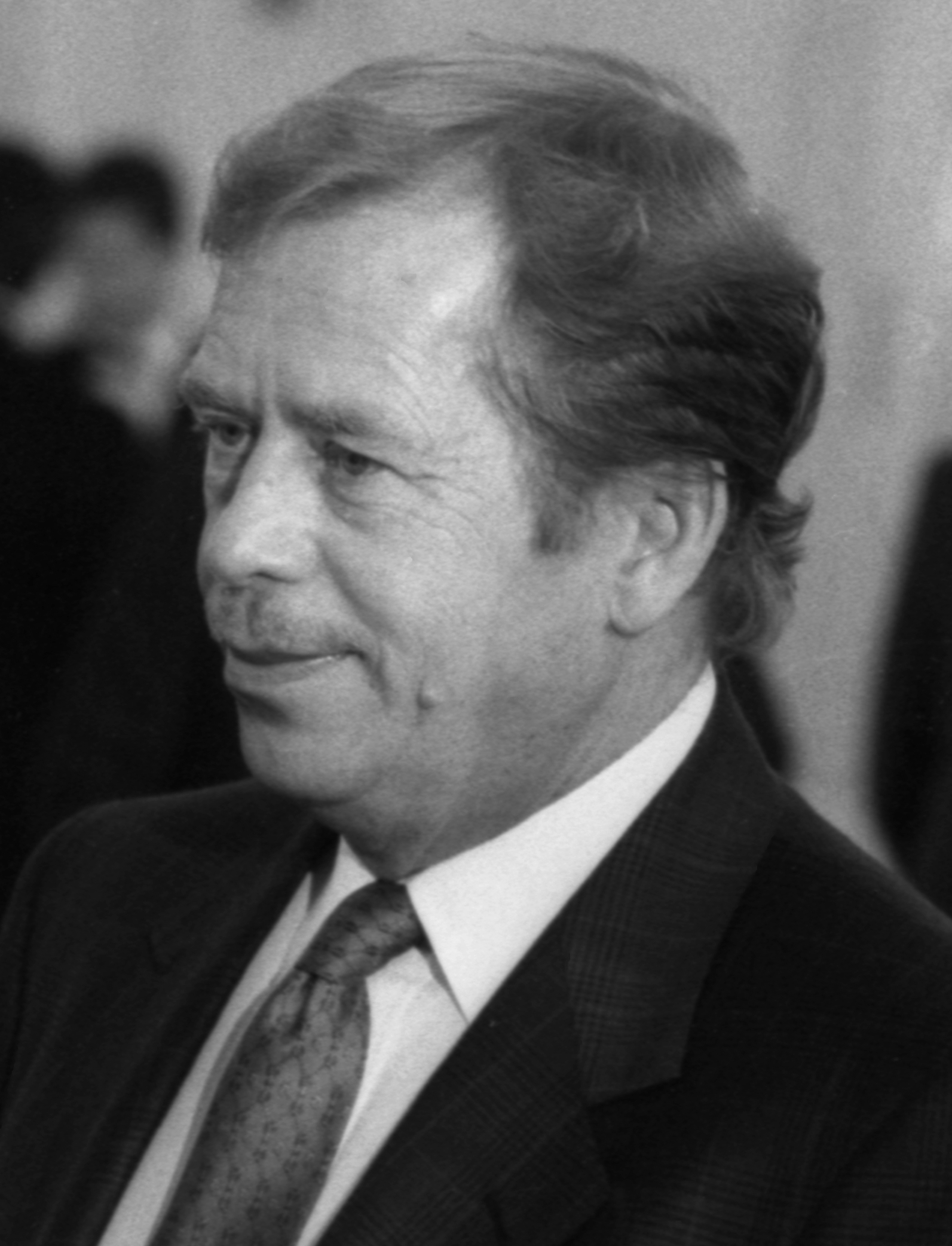
Nominee	Václav Havel
Party	OF
Electoral vote	235
Percentage	82.5%
President before election
Václav Havel
OF
Elected President
Václav Havel
OF

The 1990 Czechoslovak presidential election was held on 5 July 1990. Václav Havel was elected for his second term. Havel was the only candidate. Slovak National Party intended to nominate Štefan Kvietik who declined to run.

== Results ==
Candidate	Party	Votes	%
Václav Havel	Civic Forum	235	82.46
Against		50	17.54
Total		285	100.00
Total votes		285	–
Registered voters/turnout		300	95.00
