= 1946 Czechoslovak presidential election =

- 19 June 1946
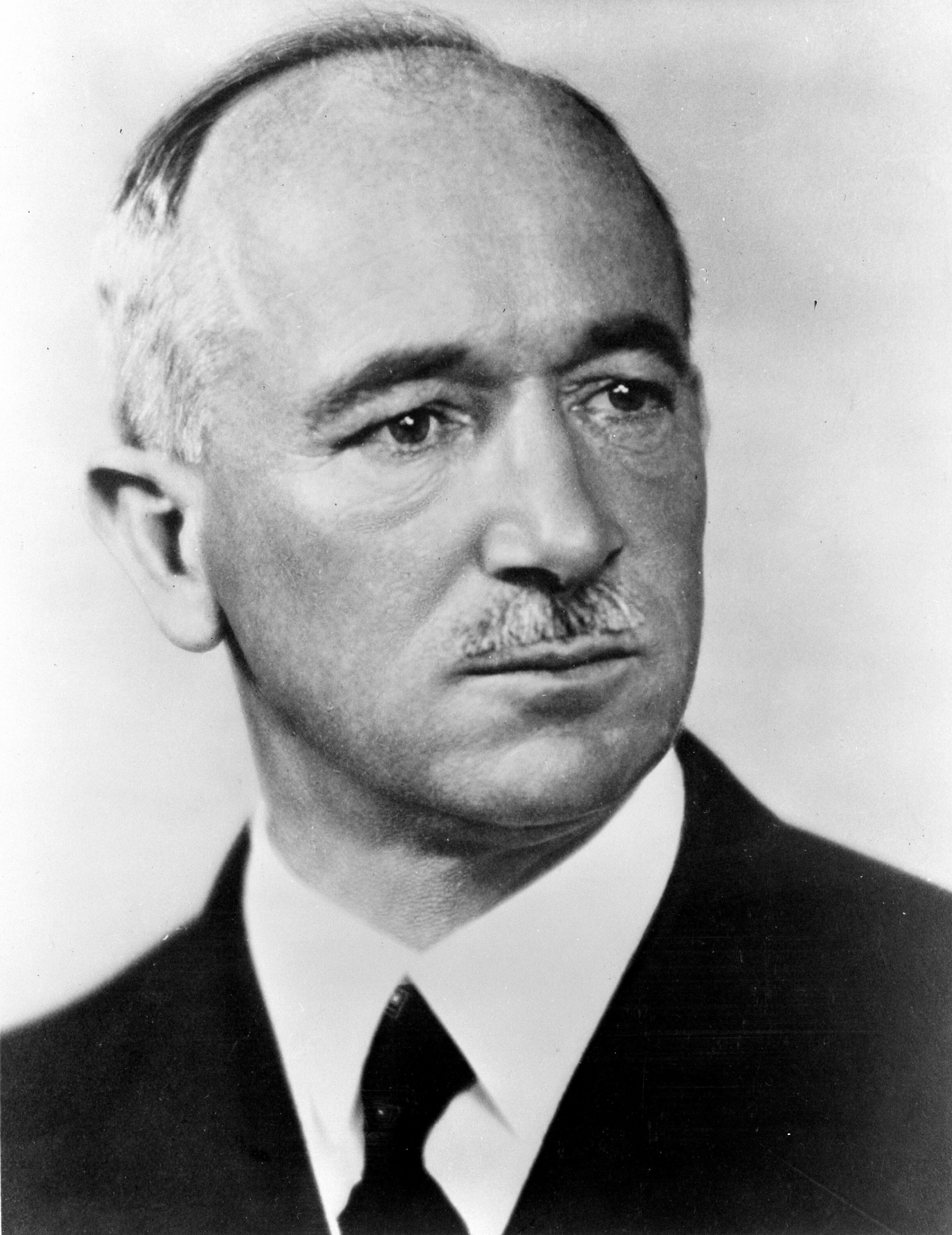
Nominee	Edvard Beneš
Party	ČSNS
Electoral vote	298
Percentage	100%
President before election
Edvard Beneš
ČSNS
Elected President
Edvard Beneš
ČSNS

The 1946 Czechoslovak presidential election took place on 19 June 1946. It was the first election since the end of World War II. Edvard Beneš was elected for his second term.

== Background ==
Edvard Beneš resigned in 1938 and emigrated to the United Kingdom. He formed the Czechoslovak government-in-exile and led the Czechoslovak resistance against Nazi Germany which occupied Czechoslovakia. He returned to Czechoslovakia after World War II and was confirmed as the President of Czechoslovakia in October 1945 by the votes of parliament.

== Voting ==
The election was held on 19 June 1946. Beneš was the only candidate. He received all 298 votes.
