= 1957 Czechoslovak presidential election =

- 19 November 1957
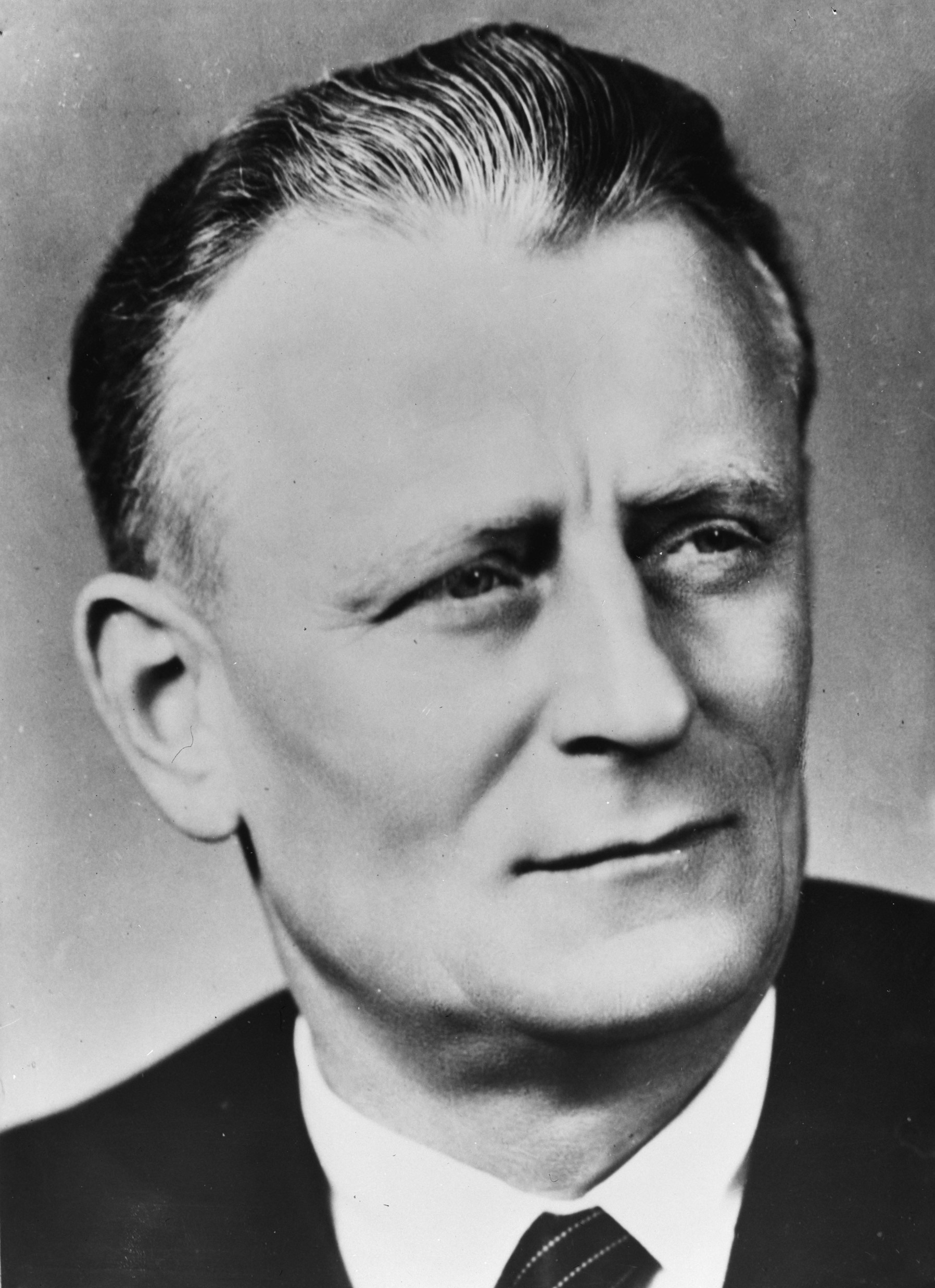
Nominee	Antonín Novotný
Party	KSČ
Electoral vote	353
Percentage	100%
President before election
Antonín Zápotocký
KSČ
Elected President
Antonín Novotný
KSČ

The 1957 Czechoslovak presidential election took place on 19 November 1957. It was held due to the death of the incumbent president Antonín Zápotocký. Antonín Novotný was elected the new president.

== Background ==
Antonín Zápotocký died of a heart attack in Fall 1957. The Prime Minister Viliam Široký was considered his successor. It was changed when the leader of Soviet Union Nikita Khrushchev suggested Antonín Novotný.

== Voting ==
The election was held on 19 November 1957. Novotný received all 353 votes.
