= 1964 Czechoslovak presidential election =

- 12 November 1964
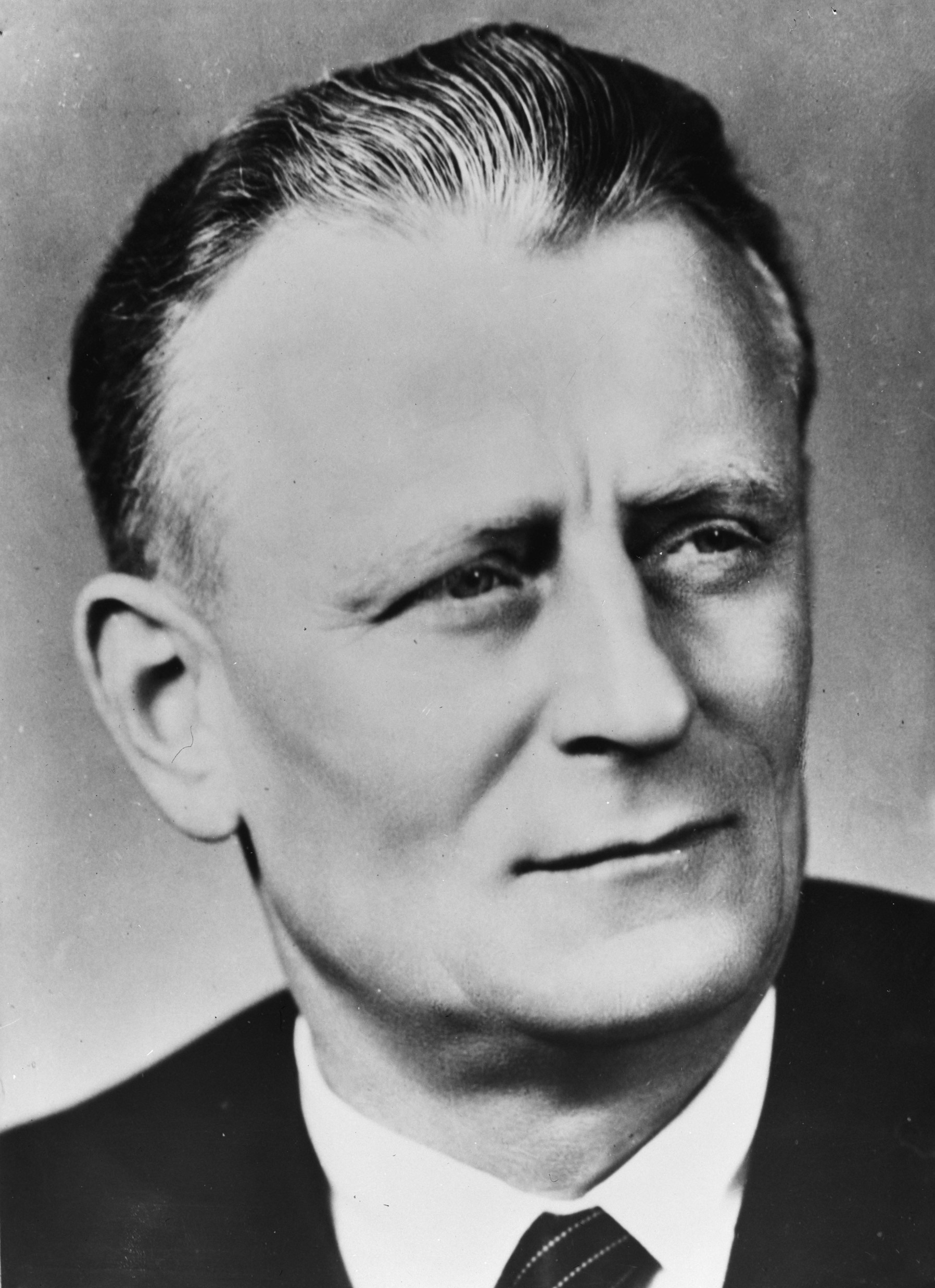
Nominee	Antonín Novotný
Party	KSČ
Electoral vote	353
Percentage	100%
President before election
Antonín Novotný
KSČ
Elected President
Antonín Novotný
KSČ

The 1964 Czechoslovak presidential election took place on 12 November 1964. Antonín Novotný was elected for his second term. It was the first time that the president was elected for a five-year term.

== Background ==
Novotný was the president since 1957 when he was elected on suggestion of Nikita Khrushchev. His first term concluded in 1964. It was speculated that he would be replaced by Jozef Lenárt. Novotný was eventually nominated as the only candidate.
