= 1989 Czechoslovak presidential election =

- 29 December 1989
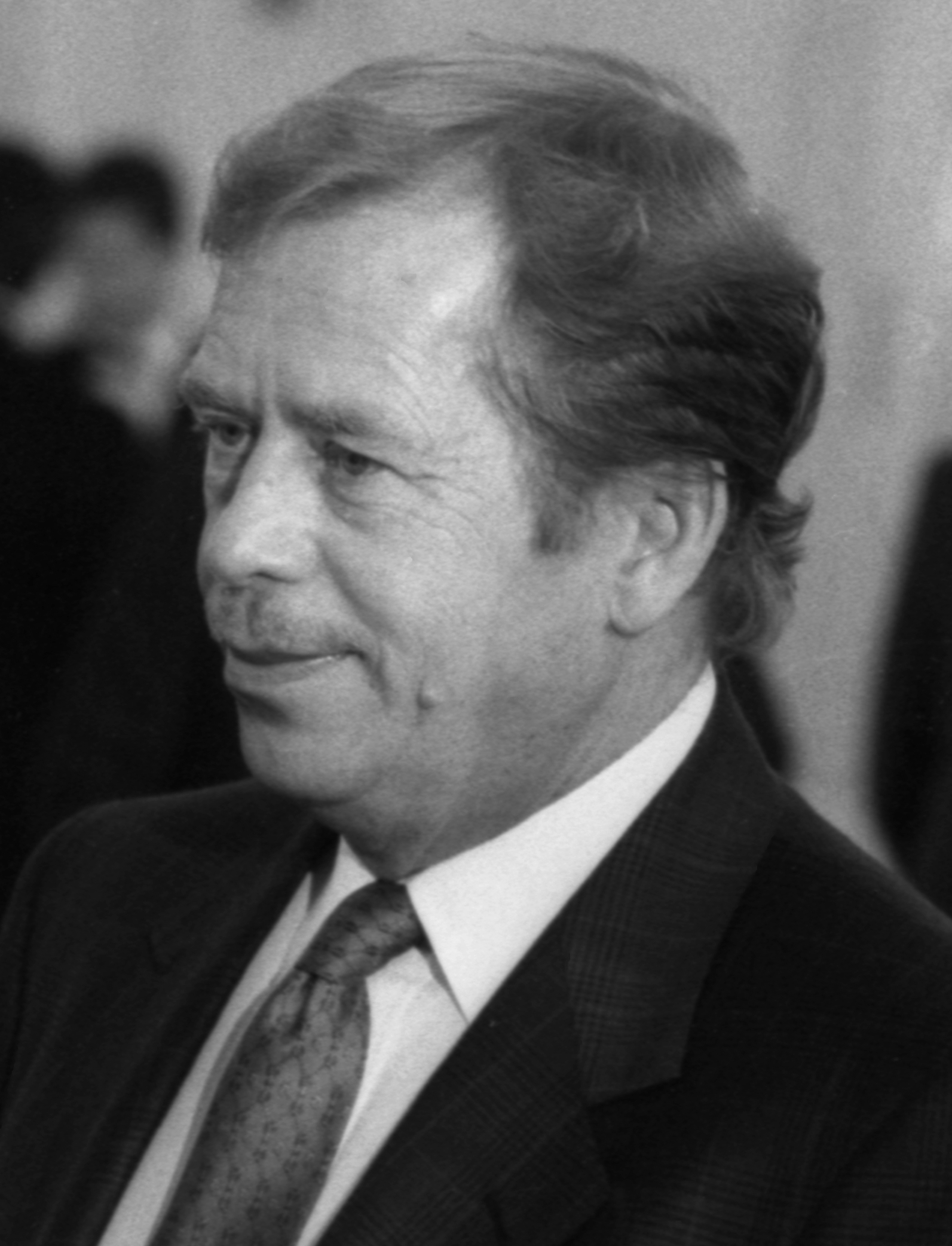
Nominee	Václav Havel
Party	OF
Electoral vote	323
Percentage	100%
President before election
Gustáv Husák
KSČ
Elected President
Václav Havel
OF

The 1989 Czechoslovak presidential election was held on 29 December. Václav Havel became the first non-communist president of Czechoslovakia since 1948. Election was held following the Velvet Revolution.

== Candidates ==
- Ladislav Adamec (KSČ)
- Čestmír Císař (SSM)
- Václav Havel (OF/VPN)

Havel was eventually the only candidate to participate in the election.

=== Other possible candidates ===
- Alexander Dubček was speculated to be a candidate. Dubček himself sought the nomination of VPN.

== Opinion polls ==
Date	Alexander Dubček	Valtr Komárek	Václav Havel	Ladislav Adamec	Čestmír Císař
6 December	11%	8%	1%	1%	1%
10 December	75%	14%	2%	2%	n/a
19 December	0.5	n/a	80%	8.5%	1%

== Results ==
Candidate	Party	Votes	%
Václav Havel	Civic Forum	323	100.00
Total		323	100.00
Total votes		323	–
Registered voters/turnout		350	92.29

Havel received votes of all 183 members of House of the People and 140 members of House of Nations.
