= 1918 Czechoslovak presidential election =

- 14 November 1918
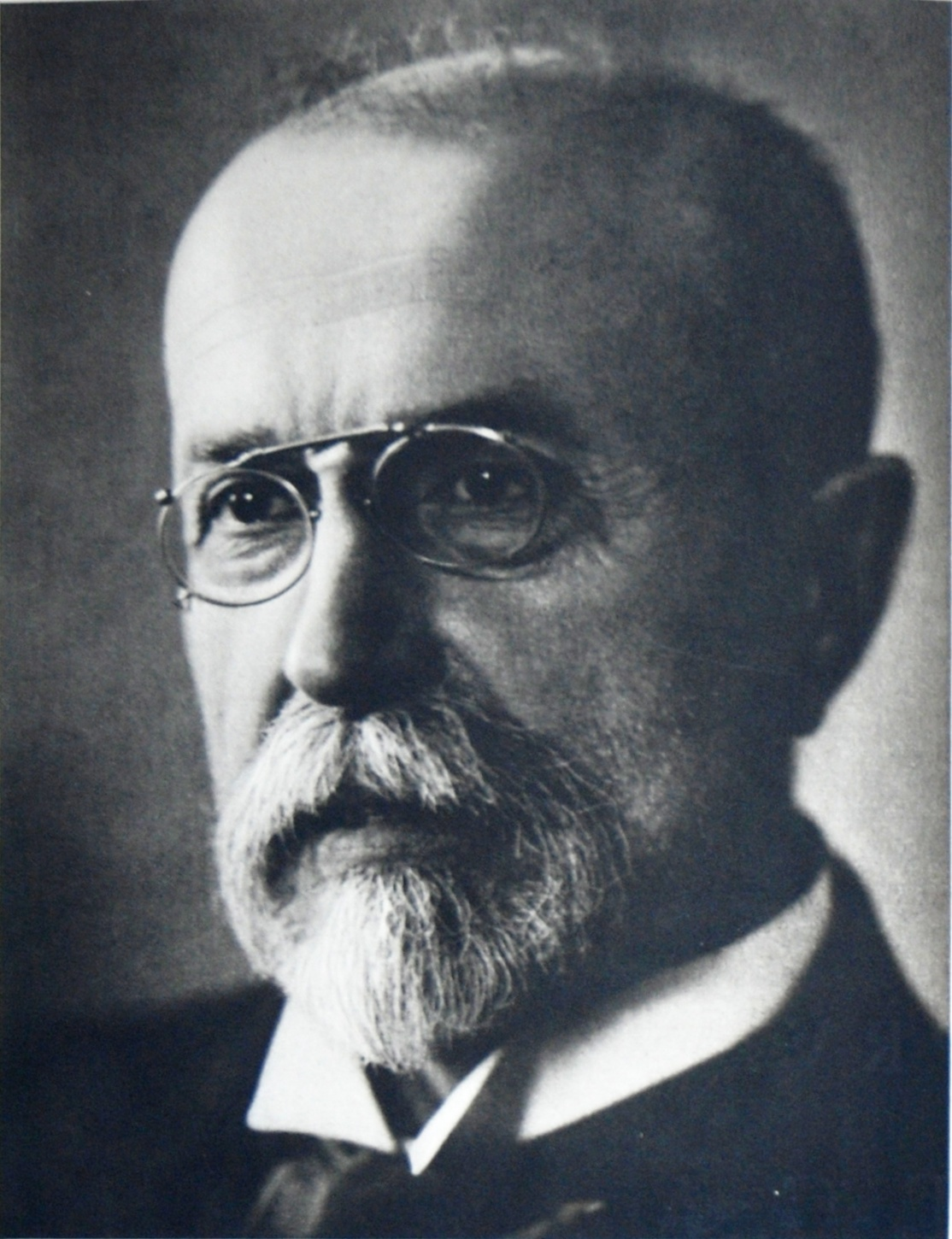
Nominee	Tomáš Garrigue Masaryk
Party	Realisté
Electoral vote	N/A
Percentage	N/A
Elected President
Tomáš Garrigue Masaryk
ČSP

The 1918 Czechoslovak presidential election took place on 14 November 1918. Tomáš Garrigue Masaryk was elected the first Czechoslovak president. The election was uncontested and Masaryk was elected by Acclamation.

== Election ==
Czechoslovakia was established as a result of fall of Austria-Hungary. Masaryk was leader of Czechoslovak resistance against the Austro-Hungarian Empire and was the only candidate. The parliament decided to elect him by acclamation for a two-year term.
