= 1948 Czechoslovak presidential election =

- 14 June 1948
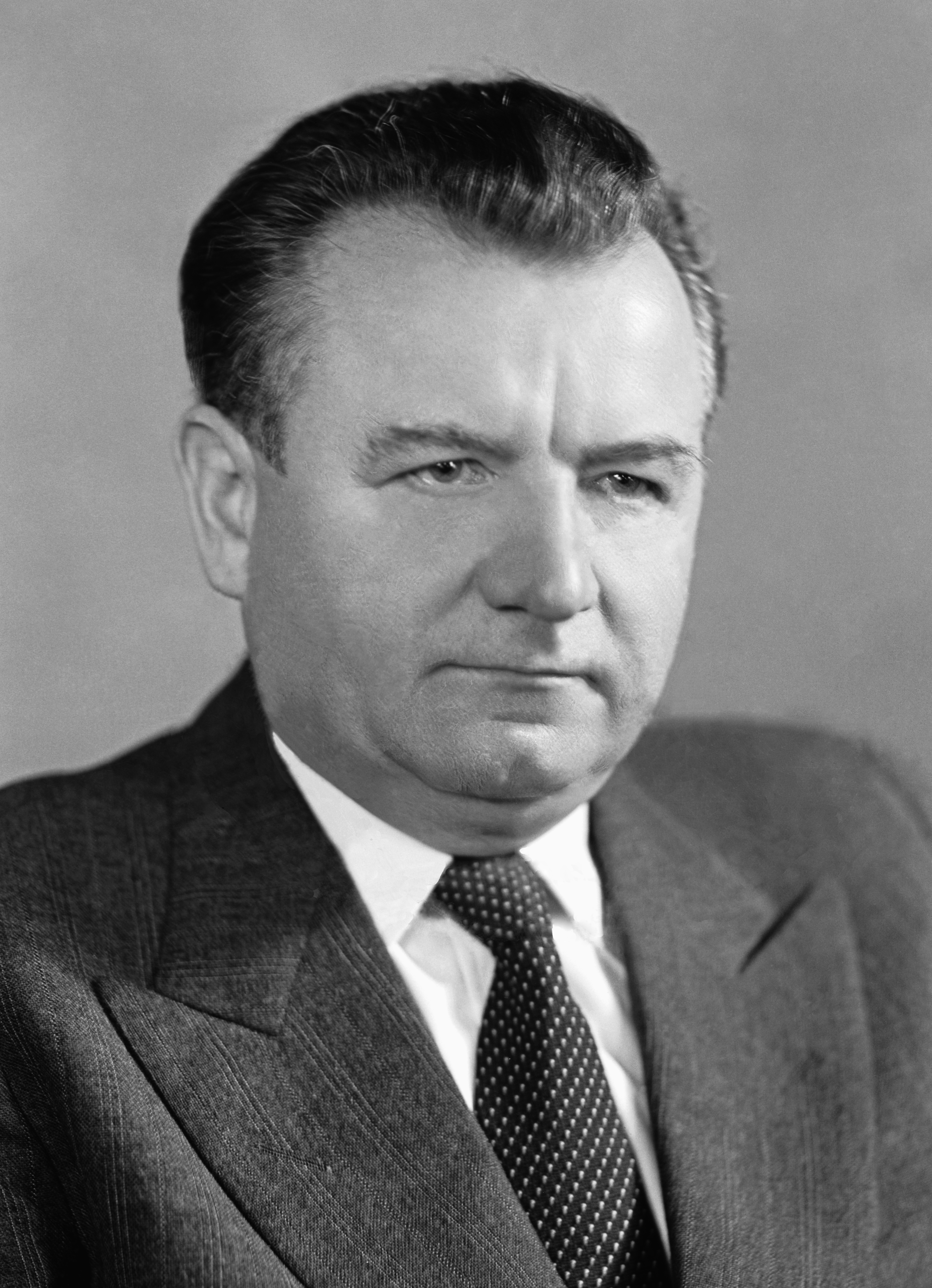
Nominee	Klement Gottwald
Party	KSČ
Electoral vote	296
Percentage	100%
President before election
Edvard Beneš
ČSNS
Elected President
Klement Gottwald
KSČ

The 1948 Czechoslovak presidential election took place on 14 June 1948. Klement Gottwald was elected the first Communist president of Czechoslovakia.

== Background ==
The Communist Party of Czechoslovakia finished first in the 1946 parliamentary election and formed a new government with party leader Klement Gottwald as Prime Minister. The party used its influence to take over the country in a 1948 coup d'etat. The incumbent president Edvard Beneš was unable to resist and resigned on 7 June 1948. In accordance with the 1920 Constitution, Gottwald took over most presidential duties pending the election of a permanent successor.

When negotiations began, two candidates were proposed–Gottwald and Culture Minister Zdeněk Nejedlý. It was eventually decided that Gottwald would be nominated in order to legitimate the Communist regime.
