= 1927 Czechoslovak presidential election =

- 27 May 1927
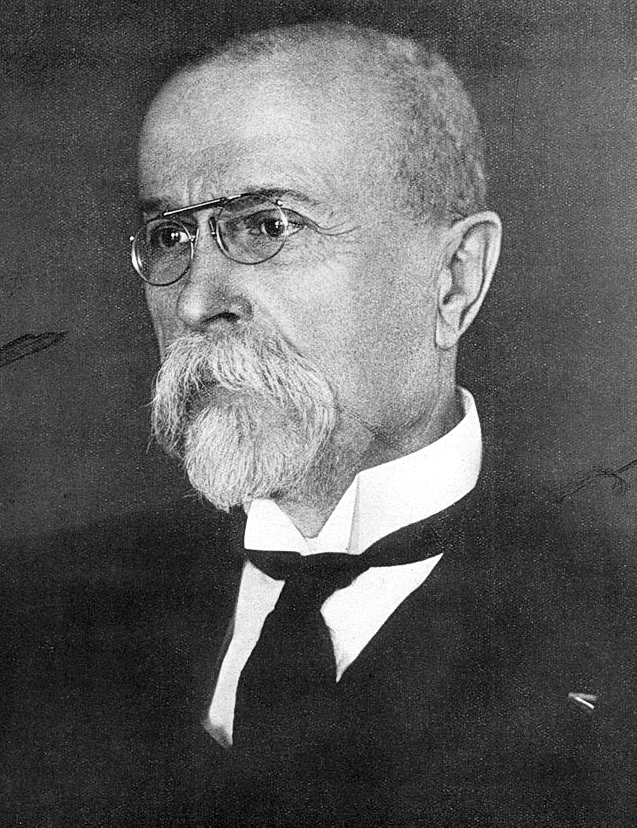

Nominee	Tomáš Garrigue Masaryk	Václav Šturc
Party	Independent	KSČ
Electoral vote	274	54
Percentage	63.4%	12.5%
President before election
Tomáš Garrigue Masaryk
Independent
Elected President
Tomáš Garrigue Masaryk
Independent

The 1927 Czechoslovak presidential election took place on 27 May 1927. Tomáš Garrigue Masaryk was elected for his third term. His main rival was Communist Václav Šturc.

== Background ==
Tomáš Garrigue Masaryk was president of Czechoslovakia since 1918. His second term concluded in 1927. He decided to seek another term but stated that he wouldn't participate in the second round if he wasn't elected during the first. The Republican Party of Farmers and Peasants nominated Antonín Švehla who became the strongest of Masaryk's competitor. The Communist Party of Czechoslovakia nominated Václav Šturc. Masaryk's reelection became uncertain as he would have withdrawn from election if he wasn't elected in the first round.

== Procedure ==
The President was elected by bicameral parliament that consisted of 300 Deputies and 150 Senators. A candidate needed 60% of votes to be elected.

== Voting ==
Candidate	Party	Votes	%
Tomáš Garrigue Masaryk	Independent	274	63.43
Blank votes		104	24.07
Václav Šturc	Communist Party of Czechoslovakia	54	12.50
Total		432	100.00
Total votes		432	–
Registered voters/turnout		450	96.00

Švehla withdrew from the election before the voting started. Šturc was Masaryk's only rival. 286 Deputies and 148 Senators participated in the election. 432 votes were submitted. Masaryk received 274 and was narrowly elected.
