= 1975 Czechoslovak presidential election =

Czechoslovak presidential election took place on 29 May 1975

- 29 May 1975
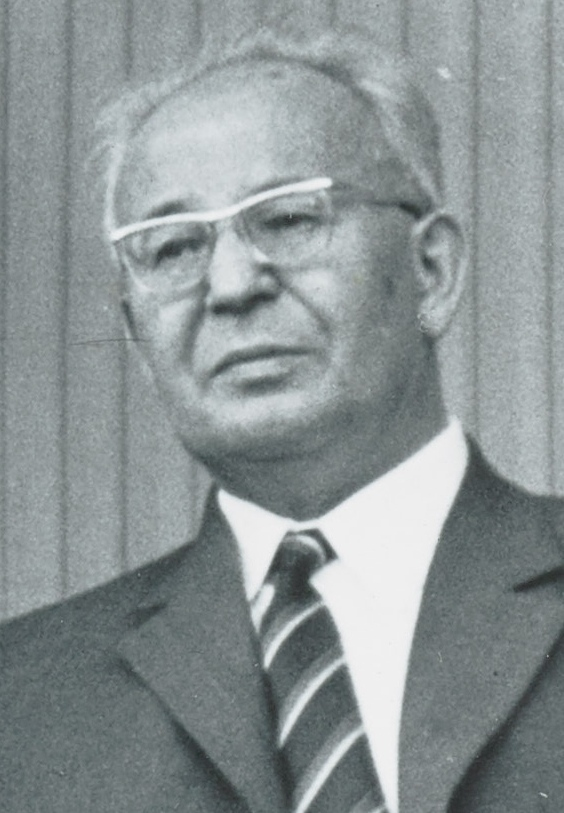
Nominee	Gustáv Husák
Party	KSČ
Electoral vote	343
Percentage	100%
President before election
Ludvík Svoboda
KSČ
Elected President
Gustáv Husák
KSČ

The 1975 Czechoslovak presidential election took place on 29 May 1975. Gustáv Husák was elected the new president.

== Background ==
The health of the incumbent president Ludvík Svoboda was getting worse and members of the Communist Party of Czechoslovakia concluded that he won't finish his second term. Vasil Bilak and Gustáv Husák were suggested for the position. Bilak had stronger support but Husák's influence increased thanks to Bilak's authoritarian behaviour.
