= Margraviate of Moravia =

Part of the Bohemian Crown from 1182 to 1918

Coordinates: 50°N 17°E

Margraviate of Moravia Markrabství moravské (Czech) Markgrafschaft Mähren (German)
- 1182–1918
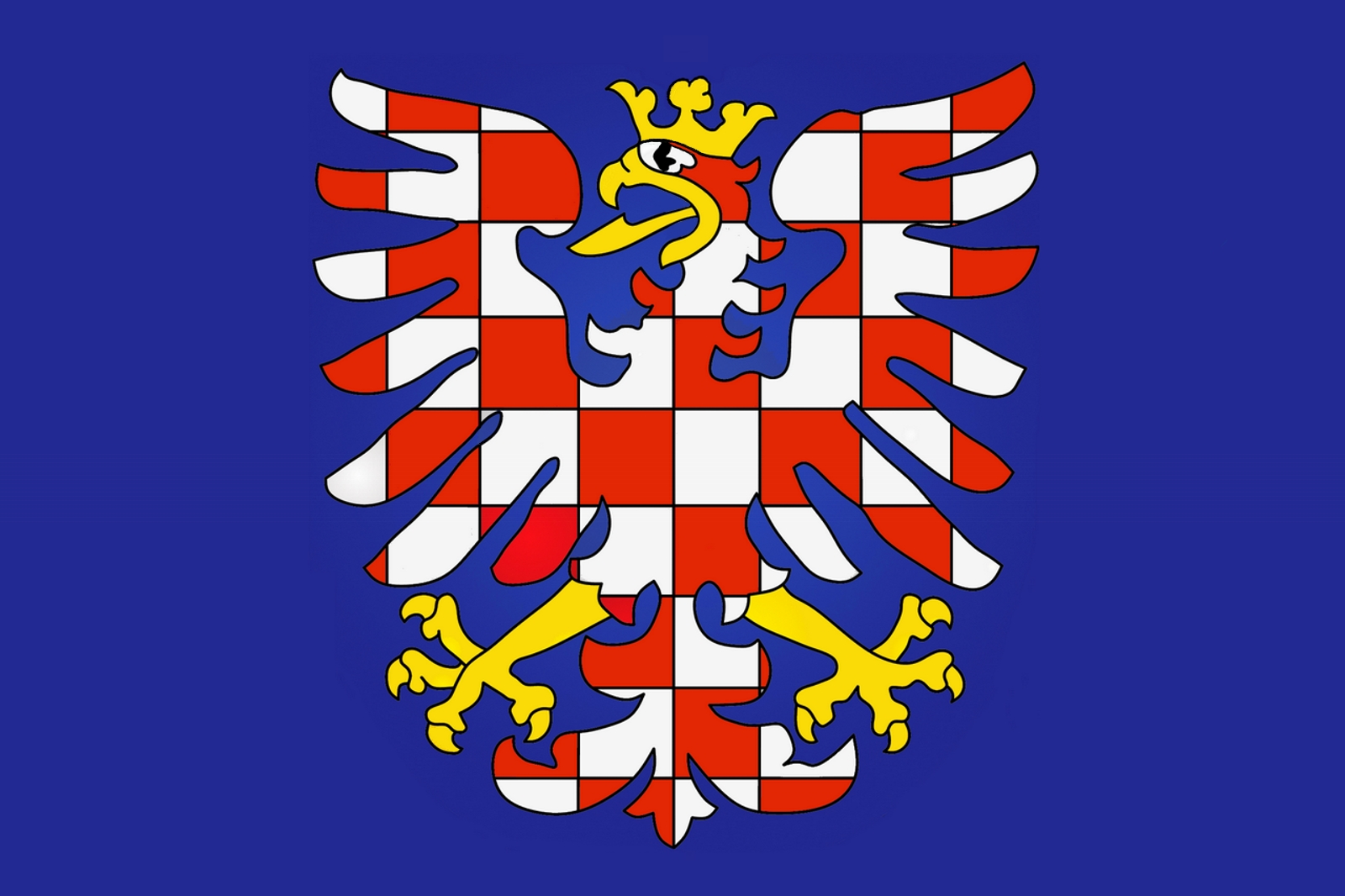
- Flag Coat of arms

- The Margraviate of Moravia and the Lands of the Bohemian Crown within the Holy Roman Empire (1618)

- The Margraviate in 1893
- Status: Crown land of the Bohemian Crown (1348–1918); Imperial State of the Holy Roman Empire (1198–1806); Crown land of the Habsburg monarchy (1526–1804), of the Austrian Empire (1804–67), and of the Cisleithanian part of Austria-Hungary (1867–1918)
- Capital: Olomouc (1182–1641); Brno (1641–1918)
- Common languages: Moravian dialects of Czech, German, Polish and Slovak
- Religion: Catholicism (official); Hussitism, later Bohemian Reformed (Moravian Church, Utraquism); Hutterian Anabaptism; Lutheranism; Judaism (Jews); Abrahamite Deism
- Demonym: Moravians
- Government: Margraviate
- Margrave
  - 1182–1191 (first): Conrad II of Bohemia
  - 1916–1918 (last): Charles I of Austria
- Legislature: Provincial Diet
- History
  - Established: 1182
  - Disestablished: 1918
Preceded by	Succeeded by
Duchy of Bohemia	First Czechoslovak Republic
- Today part of: Czech Republic; Moravia

The Margraviate of Moravia (Czech: Markrabství moravské; German: Markgrafschaft Mähren) was one of the Lands of the Bohemian Crown within the Holy Roman Empire, the Austrian Empire and Austria-Hungary, existing from 1182 to 1918. It was officially administered by a margrave in cooperation with a provincial diet. It was variously a de facto independent state, and also subject to the Duchy, later the Kingdom of Bohemia. It comprised the historical region called Moravia, which lies within the present-day Czech Republic.

== Geography ==
The Margraviate lay east of Bohemia proper, with an area about half that region's size. In the north, the Sudeten Mountains, which extend to the Moravian Gate, formed the border with the Polish Duchy of Silesia, incorporated as a Bohemian crown land upon the 1335 Treaty of Trentschin. In the east and southeast, the western Carpathian Mountains separated it from present-day Slovakia. In the south, the winding Thaya River marked the border with the Duchy of Austria.

Moravians, usually considered a Czech people that speak Moravian dialects, made up the main part of the population. According to a 1910 Cisleithanian census, 27.6% identified themselves as German Moravians. Other ethnic minority groups included Poles, Roma and Slovaks.

== History ==
After the early medieval Great Moravian realm had been finally defeated by the Árpád princes of Hungary in 907, what is now Slovakia was incorporated as "Upper Hungary" (Felső-Magyarország), while adjacent Moravia passed under the authority of the Duchy of Bohemia. King Otto I of Germany officially granted it to Duke Boleslaus I in turn for his support against the Hungarian forces in the 955 Battle of Lechfeld. Temporarily ruled by King Bolesław I Chrobry of Poland from 999 until 1019, Moravia was re-conquered by Duke Oldřich of Bohemia and ultimately became a land of the Crown of Saint Wenceslas held by the Přemyslid dynasty.

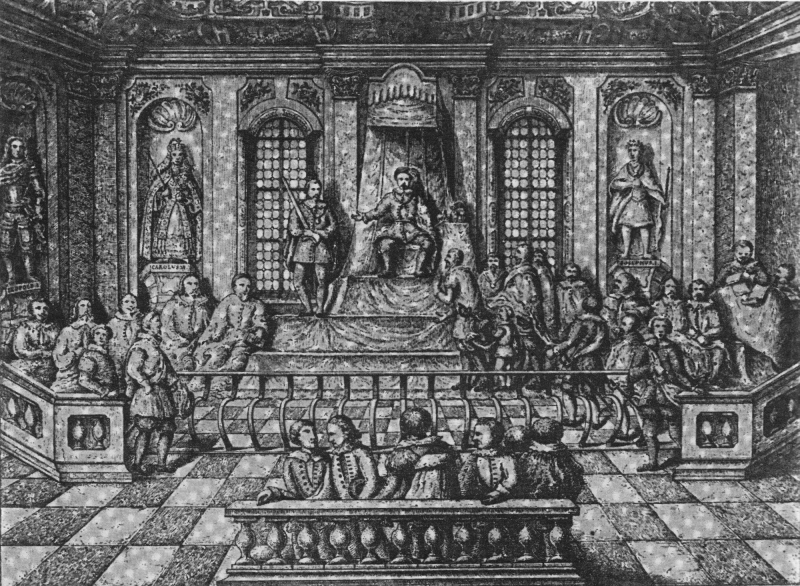
Sitting of the Moravian Diet, 17th century

In 1182, the Margraviate was created at the behest of Emperor Frederick Barbarossa by merger of the three Přemyslid appanage principalities of Brno, Olomouc and Znojmo, and given to Conrad II, the son of Prince Conrad of Znojmo. As heir apparent, the future King Ottokar II of Bohemia was appointed Moravian margrave by his father Wenceslaus I in 1247. Along with Bohemia, Moravia was ruled by the House of Luxembourg from the extinction of the Přemyslid dynasty until 1437. Jobst, nephew of Emperor Charles IV inherited the Margraviate in 1375, ruled autonomously and was even elected King of the Romans in 1410. Shaken by the Hussite Wars, the Moravian nobles remained loyal supporters of the Luxembourg emperor Sigismund.

In 1469, Moravia was occupied by the Hungarian king Matthias Corvinus, who had allied with the Catholic nobility against the rule of George of Poděbrady and had himself elected rival king of Bohemia at Olomouc. The rivalry with King Vladislaus II was settled in the 1479 Peace of Olomouc, whereby Matthias renounced the royal title but retained the rule over the Moravian lands.

From 1599 to 1711, Moravia was frequently subjected to raids by the Ottoman Empire and its vassals (especially the Tatars and Transylvania). Overall, hundreds of thousands were enslaved whilst tens of thousands were killed.

With the other lands of the Bohemian Crown, the Margraviate was incorporated into the Habsburg monarchy upon the death of King Louis II in the 1526 Battle of Mohács. Moravia was ruled as a crown land within the Austrian Empire from 1804 and within Cisleithanian Austria from 1867.

During the foundation of Czechoslovakia after World War I, the Margraviate was transformed into "Moravia Land", later "Moravia-Silesia Land" in 1918. This autonomy was eliminated in 1949 by the communist government and has not been re-established since.

== Government ==
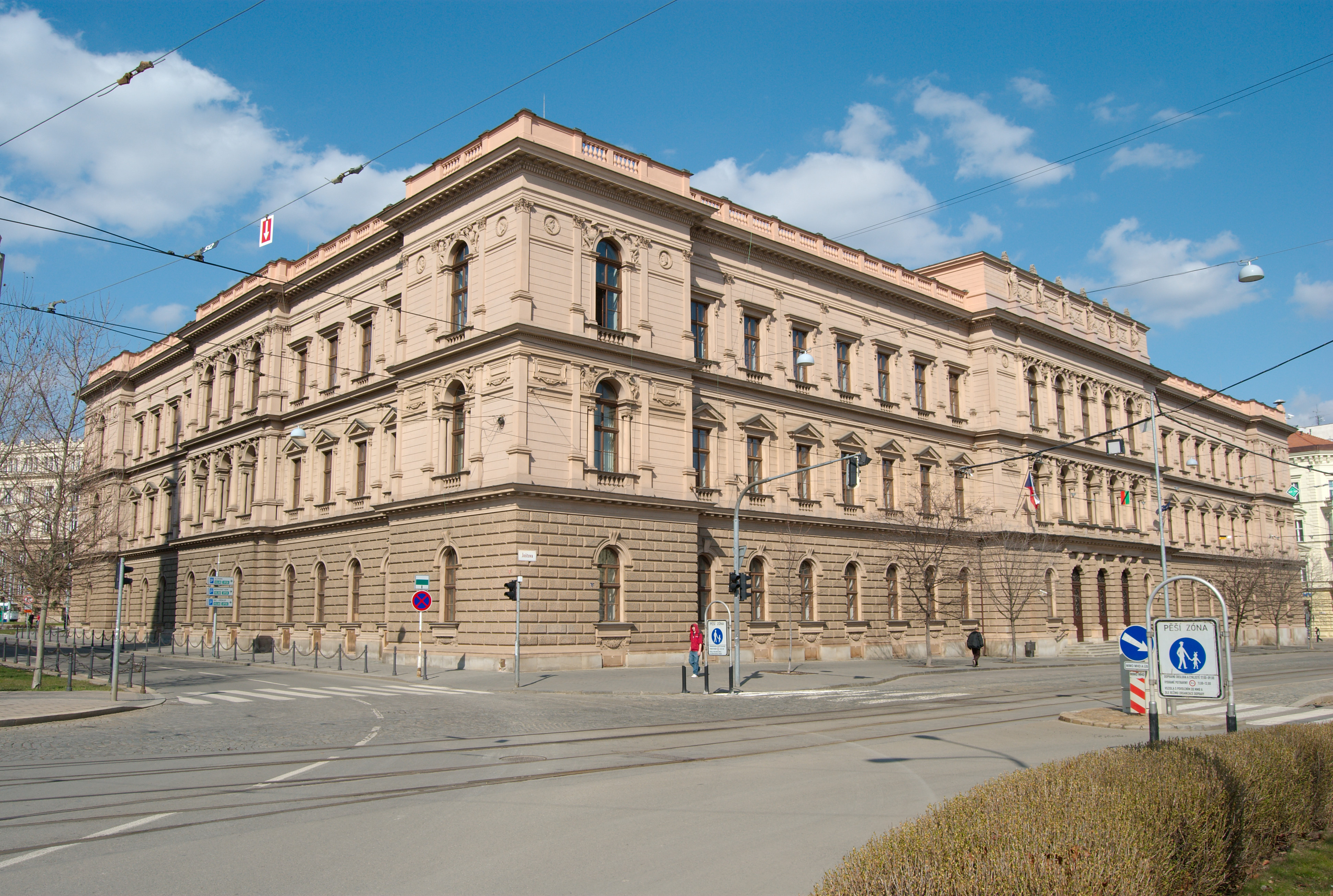
The former Moravian Diet building. It now houses the Constitutional Court of the Czech Republic.

The margrave held ultimate authority in Moravia, throughout the history of the margraviate. This meant that as its margraves became more foreign, so too did governance of the margraviate.

Moravia possessed a legislature, known as the Moravian Diet. The assembly has its origins in 1288, with the Colloquium generale, or curia generalis. This was a meeting of the upper nobility, knights, the Bishop of Olomouc, abbots and ambassadors from royal cities. These meetings gradually evolved into the diet.

The power of this diet waxed and waned throughout history. By the end of the margraviate, the diet was almost powerless. The diet consisted of three estates of the realm: the estate of upper nobility, the estate of the lower nobility, and the estate of prelates and burghers. With the February Patent of 1861, the diet was reformed into a more egalitarian body. It still retained the same structure, but the members changed. It consisted of assembly seats for landowners, city-dwellers, and rural farmers. This was retained until the diet was abolished after the fall of the Dual Monarchy.

== Moravian eagle ==
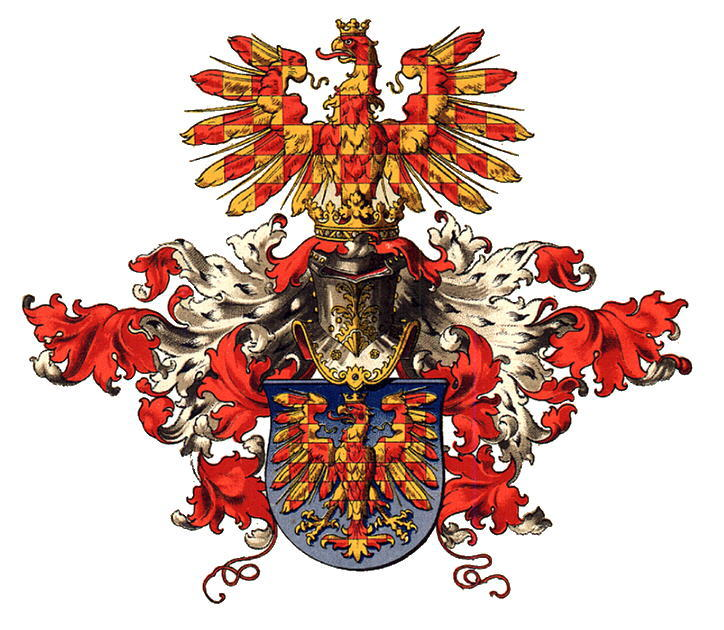
The unadopted coat of arms as a heraldic artwork made by Hugo Gerard Ströhl

The coat of arms of Moravia is charged with a crowned silver-red chequered eagle with golden claws and tongue. It first appeared in the seal of Margrave Přemysl (1209–1239), a younger son of King Ottokar I of Bohemia. After 1462, the Moravian eagle was gold-red chequered, but was never accepted by the Moravian assembly.

== Administration ==
=== Until 1848 ===
In the mid 14th century Emperor Charles IV, also King of Bohemia and Margrave of Moravia, established administrative divisions called kraje (Kreise in German). These subdivisions were named for their capitals:

- Brno
- Jihlava
- Olomouc
- Přerov
- Uherské Hradiště
- Znojmo

=== After 1848 ===
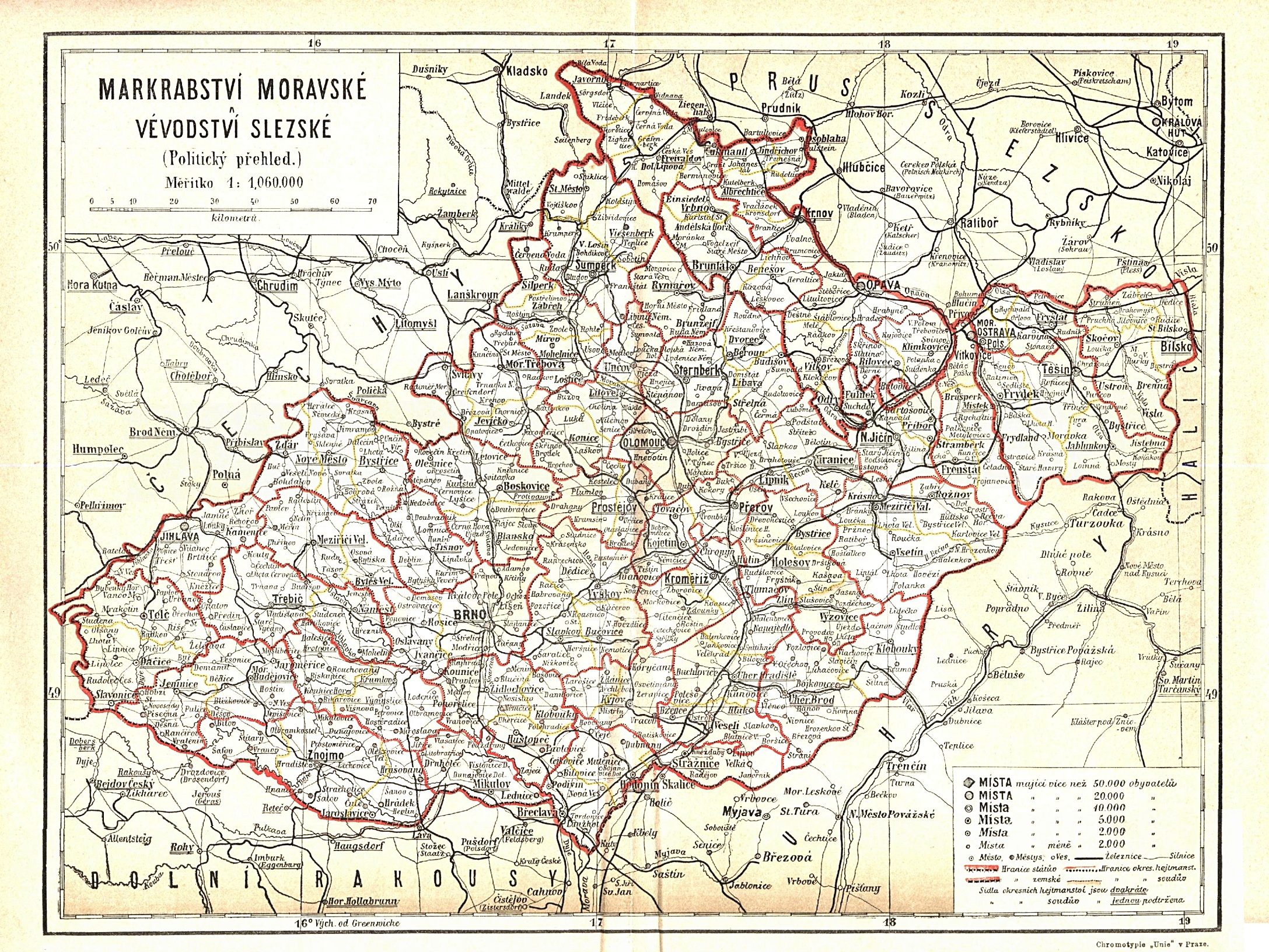
Moravian and Austrian Silesian districts, 1897

After the 1848 revolutions, political districts (politický okres, politische Bezirke; formally Bezirkshauptmannschaften) were established, which were organised into two Kreise/kraje – Brünn and Olmütz.

- Brünner Kreis (Brněnský kraj) – 12 districts:
  - Brünn
  - Trübau
  - Boskowitz
  - Witschau
  - Gaya
  - Auspitz
  - Iglau
  - Datschitz
  - Znaym [sic]
  - Kromau
  - Nikolsburg
- Olmützer Kreis (Olomoucký kraj) – 13 districts:
  - Olmütz
  - Sternberg
  - Schönberg
  - Hohenstadt
  - Littau
  - Neutitschein
  - Weißkirchen
  - Wistek
  - Wallachisch-Meseritsch
  - Hradisch
  - Kremsier
  - Holleschau
  - Ungarischbrod [sic]

In Bach's reforms of 1854 the former kraje were restored (albeit with some minor border changes and with Nový Jičín (Neutitschein) replacing Přerov) and the political districts were replaced by 'office districts' (Amtsbezirke), subordinate to the kraje which distributed some of their authority. The Moravian capital Brno/Brünn acted as the seat for Kreis Brünn/Brněnský kraj but as a statutory city was directly subordinate to Moravia.

- Kreis Brünn (Brněnský kraj) – 17 districts:
  - Auspitz
  - Austerlitz
  - Blansko
  - Boskowitz
  - Brünn (environs)
  - Butschowitz
  - Eibenschitz
  - Gewitsch
  - Klobauk
  - Kunstadt
  - Lundenburg
  - Seelowitz
  - Steinitz
  - Titschnowitz
  - Triebau
  - Wischau
  - Zwittau
- Kreis Olmütz (Olomoucký kraj) – 17 districts:
  - Altstadt
  - Hof
  - Hohenstadt
  - Kojetein
  - Littau
  - Müglitz
  - Mährisch-Naustadt
  - Olmütz (environs)
  - Plumenau
  - Prerau
  - Proßnitz
  - Römerstadt
  - Schildberg
  - Schönberg
  - Sternberg
  - Weisenberg
  - Olmütz (city)
- Kreis Neutitschein – 13 districts:
  - Bystřitz
  - Frankstadt
  - Freiberg
  - Fulnek
  - Leipnitz
  - Liebau
  - Walachisch-Meseritsch
  - Mistek
  - Neutitschein
  - Mährisch-Ostrau
  - Rožnau
  - Weißkirchen
  - Wsetin
- Kreis Hradisch (Hradišťský kraj) – 12 districts:
  - Ungarisch-Brod
  - Gaya
  - Göding
  - Holleschau
  - Hradisch
  - Klobauk
  - Kremsier
  - Rapajedl
  - Ungarisch-Ostra
  - Stražnitz
  - Wisowitz
  - Zdaunek
- Kreis Znaim (Znojemský kraj) – 9 districts:
  - Mährisch-Budwitz
  - Frain
  - Hrottowitz
  - Jamnitz
  - Joslowitz
  - Kromau
  - Namiescht
  - Nikolsburg
  - Znaim
- Kreis Iglau (Jihlavský kraj) – 8 districts:
  - Bystřitz
  - Datschitz
  - Iglau
  - Groß-Meseritsch
  - Neustadtl
  - Saar
  - Teltsch
  - Trebitsch

In 1860 the Kreise/kraje were dissolved and the districts were subordinated directly to the Statthalterei in Brünn/Brno.

Political districts were re-established in the December Constitution following the Austro-Hungarian Compromise of 1867 and remained in place until Austria-Hungary's dissolution. They were largely retained by the Czechoslovak administration after 1918:

- Boskovice
- Brno
- Dačice
- Hodonín
- Holešov
- Hranice na Moravě
- Hustopeče
- Jihlava
- Kroměříž
- Kyjov
- Litovel
- Mikulov
- Místek
- Moravská Třebová
- Moravské Budějovice
- Moravský Beroun
- Moravský Krumlov
- Nové Město na Moravě
- Nový Jičín
- Olomouc
- Ostrava
- Přerov
- Prostějov
- Rýmařov
- Šternberk
- Šumperk
- Tišnov
- Třebíč
- Uherské Hradiště
- Uherský Brod
- Valašské Meziříčí
- Velké Meziříčí
- Vsetín
- Vyškov
- Zábřeh
- Znojmo

== Demographics ==
The region experienced rapid population growth when it was part of Austria-Hungary. From 1890 to 1900 alone there was an increase of 7.1%. The population development from 1851 to 1900 was as follows:

Year	1851	1880	1890	1900
Population	1,799,838	2,153,407	2,276,870	2,437,706

=== Ethnicity ===
Judicial districts (Gerichtsbezirke) in Moravia

In terms of ethnicity, the population was predominantly divided between Czechs and Germans. The German minority mostly lived on the borders with Lower Austria and Silesia, and in various language islands (around Brünn, Olmütz, Iglau and Zwittau), as well as in some larger cities. The ethnic distribution according to the census was as follows:

Ethnicity	1880		1900	
Czechs	1,507,327	70.0%	1,727,270	70.9%
Germans	628,907	29.2%	675,492	27.7%
Others	17,173	0.8%	34,944	1.4%
Total	2,153,407		2,437,706	

=== Population by district (1910) ===
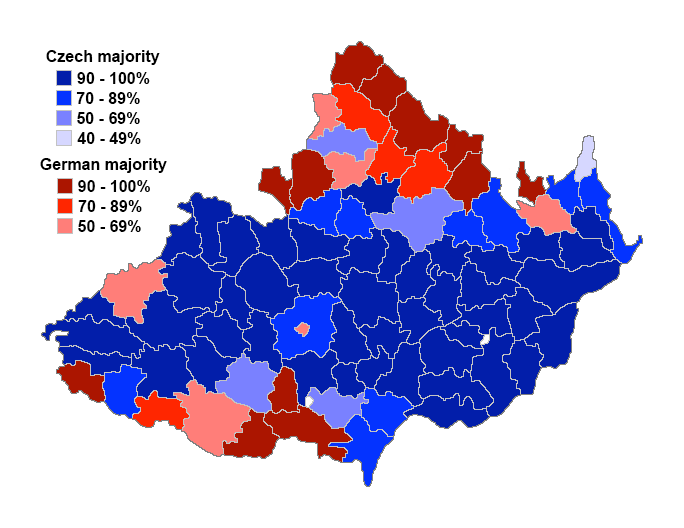
Ethnic distribution in Moravia in 1910

Judicial district	Czech name	Political district (Politischer Bezirk)	Population	Germans	%	Czechs	%	Others	%	Foreigners	%
Auspitz	Hustopeč	Auspitz	24,506	10,319	42.1%	14,128	57.7%	1	0.0%	58	0.2%
Austerlitz	Slavkov	Wischau	33,604	808	2.4%	32,679	97.2%	6	0.0%	111	0.3%
Blansko	Blansko	Boskowitz	34,816	186	0.5%	34,584	99.3%	1	0.0%	45	0.1%
Bojkowitz	Bojkovice	Ungarisch Brod	13,816	11	0.1%	13,673	99.0%	7	0.1%	125	0.9%
Boskowitz	Boskovice	Boskowitz	30,762	981	3.2%	29,724	96.6%	6	0.0%	51	0.2%
Brünn	Brno	Brünn	125,737	81,617	64.9%	41,943	33.4%	214	0.2%	1,963	1.6%
Brünn Umgebung	Brno okolí	Brünn (Landbezirk)	125,828	14,702	11.7%	110,457	87.8%	80	0.1%	589	0.5%
Butschowitz	Bučovice	Wischau	19,922	144	0.7%	19,734	99.1%	2	0.0%	42	0.2%
Bystřitz	Bystřice	Neustadtl in Mähren	21,762	39	0.2%	21,700	99.7%	0	0.0%	23	0.1%
Bystřitz am Hostein	Bystřice pod Hostýnem	Holleschau	21,944	144	0.7%	21,687	98.8%	8	0.0%	105	0.5%
Datschitz	Dačice	Datschitz	13,075	176	1.3%	12,893	98.6%	0	0.0%	6	0.0%
Eibenschitz	Ivančice	Brünn (Landbezirk)	36,665	2,087	5.7%	34,461	94.0%	7	0.0%	110	0.3%
Frain	Vranov	Znaim (Landbezirk)	9,123	7,920	86.8%	1,157	12.7%	8	0.1%	38	0.4%
Frankstadt	Frenštát	Mistek	19,087	85	0.4%	18,864	98.8%	53	0.3%	85	0.4%
Freiberg	Příbor	Neutitschein	25,710	6,877	26.7%	18,524	72.0%	89	0.3%	220	0.9%
Fulnek	Fulnek	Neutitschein	14,771	13,960	94.5%	630	4.3%	58	0.4%	123	0.8%
Gaya	Kyjov	Gaya	39,836	884	2.2%	38,728	97.2%	7	0.0%	217	0.5%
Gewitsch	Jevíčko	Mährisch Trübau	21,898	3,024	13.8%	18,849	86.1%	0	0.0%	25	0.1%
Göding	Hodonín	Göding	35,510	5,369	15.1%	28,813	81.1%	63	0.2%	1,265	3.6%
Großbittesch	Velká Byteš	Großmeseritsch	12,946	23	0.2%	12,918	99.8%	0	0.0%	5	0.0%
Großmeseritsch	Velké Meziříčí	Großmeseritsch	28,253	189	0.7%	28,045	99.3%	0	0.0%	19	0.1%
Hof	Dvorec	Bärn	12,293	12,203	99.3%	20	0.2%	0	0.0%	70	0.6%
Hohenstadt	Zábřeh	Hohenstadt	31,071	9,954	32.0%	21,042	67.7%	1	0.0%	74	0.2%
Holleschau	Holešov	Holleschau	32,225	440	1.4%	31,657	98.2%	0	0.0%	128	0.4%
Hrottowitz	Hrotovice	Mährisch Kromau	15,704	80	0.5%	15,598	99.3%	6	0.0%	20	0.1%
Iglau	Jihlava	Iglau (Landbezirk), Iglau (Stadt)	53,513	27,886	52.1%	25,380	47.4%	14	0.0%	233	0.4%
Jamnitz	Jemnice	Mährisch Budwitz	13,709	3,406	24.8%	10,272	74.9%	10	0.1%	21	0.2%
Joslowitz	Jaroslavice	Znaim (Landbezirk)	24,043	23,694	98.5%	280	1.2%	4	0.0%	65	0.3%
Klobouk	Klobouky	Auspitz	14,282	50	0.4%	14,194	99.4%	1	0.0%	37	0.3%
Kojetein	Kojetín	Prerau	31,010	225	0.7%	30,348	97.9%	33	0.1%	404	1.3%
Konitz	Konice	Littau	23,179	5,329	23.0%	17,842	77.0%	0	0.0%	8	0.0%
Kremsier	Kroměříž	Kremsier (Land), Kremsier (Stadt)	42,496	893	2.1%	41,388	97.4%	49	0.1%	166	0.4%
Kunstadt	Kunštát	Boskowitz	25,335	73	0.3%	25,248	99.7%	2	0.0%	12	0.0%
Leipnik	Lipník	Mährisch Weißkirchen	23,182	3,512	15.1%	19,503	84.1%	22	0.1%	145	0.6%
Littau	Litovel	Littau	26,121	1,125	4.3%	24,967	95.6%	7	0.0%	22	0.1%
Lundenburg	Břeclav	Göding	31,699	5,370	16.9%	25,860	81.6%	5	0.0%	464	1.5%
Mährisch Altstadt	Staré Město	Mährisch Schönberg	15,511	15,429	99.5%	38	0.2%	0	0.0%	44	0.3%
Mährisch Budwitz	Moravské Budějovice	Mährisch Budwitz	25,839	169	0.7%	25,639	99.2%	0	0.0%	31	0.1%
Mährisch Kromau	Moravský Krumlov	Mährisch Kromau	26,911	11,595	43.1%	15,259	56.7%	1	0.0%	56	0.2%
Mährisch Neustadt	Unčov	Sternberg	24,567	20,136	82.0%	4,373	17.8%	1	0.0%	57	0.2%
Mährisch Ostrau	Moravská Ostrava	Mährisch Ostrau	111,186	43,246	38.9%	52,254	47.0%	12,906	11.6%	2,780	2.5%
Mährisch Schönberg	Šumperk	Mährisch Schönberg	50,348	38,179	75.8%	11,814	23.5%	59	0.1%	296	0.6%
Mährisch Trübau	Moravská Třebová	Mährisch Trübau	29,996	27,926	93.1%	1,943	6.5%	7	0.0%	120	0.4%
Mährisch Weißkirchen	Hranice	Mährisch Weißkirchen	35,465	8,701	24.5%	26,345	74.3%	141	0.4%	278	0.8%
Mistek	Místek	Mistek	36,917	3,457	9.4%	32,990	89.4%	200	0.5%	270	0.7%
Müglitz	Mohelnice	Hohenstadt	23,360	13,993	59.9%	9,209	39.4%	74	0.3%	84	0.4%
Namiest an der Oslawa	Náměšť nad Oslavou	Trebitsch	15,711	67	0.4%	15,636	99.5%	0	0.0%	8	0.1%
Napajedl	Napajedla	Ungarisch Hradisch	29,861	38	0.1%	29,696	99.4%	7	0.0%	120	0.4%
Neustadtl in Mähren	Nové Město na Moravě	Neustadtl in Mähren	22,297	31	0.1%	22,246	99.8%	1	0.0%	19	0.1%
Neutitschein	Nový Jičín	Neutitschein	44,764	23,976	53.6%	20,400	45.6%	71	0.2%	317	0.7%
Nikolsburg	Mikulov	Nikolsburg	33,030	31,619	95.7%	597	1.8%	683	2.1%	131	0.4%
Olmütz	Olomouc	Olmütz (Land), Olmütz (Stadt)	103,280	30,987	30.0%	70,645	68.4%	934	0.9%	714	0.7%
Plumenau	Plumlov	Proßnitz	23,738	84	0.4%	23,640	99.6%	0	0.0%	14	0.1%
Pohrlitz	Pohořelice	Nikolsburg	16,021	15,292	95.4%	654	4.1%	2	0.0%	73	0.5%
Prerau	Přerov	Prerau	47,174	1,635	3.5%	45,250	95.9%	59	0.1%	230	0.5%
Proßnitz	Prostějov	Proßnitz	57,735	2,407	4.2%	54,839	95.0%	181	0.3%	308	0.5%
Römerstadt	Rýmařov	Römerstadt	28,497	28,355	99.5%	4	0.0%	25	0.1%	113	0.4%
Rožnau am Radhorst	Rožnov pod Radhoštěm	Wallachisch Meseritsch	20,178	29	0.1%	20,118	99.7%	0	0.0%	31	0.2%
Saar	Žďár	Neustadtl in Mähren	14,383	30	0.2%	14,330	99.6%	1	0.0%	22	0.2%
Schildberg	Šilperk	Hohenstadt	16,388	9,150	55.8%	7,194	43.9%	2	0.0%	42	0.3%
Seelowitz	Židlochovice	Auspitz	30,980	2,476	8.0%	28,454	91.8%	5	0.0%	45	0.1%
Stadt Liebau	Město Libavá	Bärn	17,347	17,285	99.6%	28	0.2%	0	0.0%	34	0.2%
Steinitz	Ždánice	Gaya	14,814	205	1.4%	14,567	98.3%	0	0.0%	42	0.3%
Sternberg	Šternberk	Sternberg	36,123	28,018	77.6%	7,982	22.1%	5	0.0%	118	0.3%
Straßnitz	Strážnice	Göding	26,425	427	1.6%	25,744	97.4%	2	0.0%	252	1.0%
Teltsch	Telč	Datschitz	26,137	95	0.4%	25,982	99.4%	0	0.0%	60	0.2%
Tischnowitz	Tišnov	Tischnowitz	35,406	264	0.7%	35,044	99.0%	18	0.1%	80	0.2%
Trebitsch	Třebíč	Trebitsch	40,832	837	2.0%	39,919	97.8%	6	0.0%	70	0.2%
Triesch	Třešť	Iglau (Landbezirk)	14,249	160	1.1%	14,057	98.7%	2	0.0%	30	0.2%
Ungarisch Brod	Uherský Brod	Ungarisch Brod	36,954	706	1.9%	35,929	97.2%	11	0.0%	308	0.8%
Ungarisch Hradisch	Uherské Hradiště	Ungarisch Hradisch (Land), Ungarisch Hradisch (Stadt)	41,354	100	0.2%	41,129	99.5%	1	0.0%	124	0.3%
Ungarisch Ostra	Uherský Ostroh	Ungarisch Hradisch	46,528	469	1.0%	45,846	98.5%	7	0.0%	206	0.4%
Wallachisch Klobouk	Valašské Klobouky	Ungarisch Brod	26,419	101	0.4%	25,784	97.6%	41	0.2%	493	1.9%
Wallachisch Meseritsch	Valašské Meziříčí	Wallachisch Meseritsch	24,657	319	1.3%	24,224	98.2%	15	0.1%	99	0.4%
Wiesenberg	Viesenberk	Mährisch Schönberg	14,525	14,465	99.6%	7	0.0%	4	0.0%	49	0.3%
Wischau	Vyškov	Wischau	43,545	3,486	8.0%	39,976	91.8%	6	0.0%	77	0.2%
Wisowitz	Vizovice	Holleschau	23,469	2	0.0%	23,223	99.0%	90	0.4%	154	0.7%
Wsetin	Vsetín	Wsetin	42,976	214	0.5%	42,250	98.3%	22	0.1%	490	1.1%
Zdounek	Zdounky	Kremsier (Landbezirk)	22,368	92	0.4%	22,241	99.4%	4	0.0%	31	0.1%
Zlabings	Slavonice	Datschitz	10,090	9,322	92.4%	734	7.3%	0	0.0%	34	0.3%
Znaim	Znojmo	Znaim (Land), Znaim	61,866	42,253	68.3%	18,339	29.6%	52	0.1%	1,222	2.0%
Zwittau	Svitavy	Mährisch Trübau	28,197	27,339	97.0%	767	2.7%	0	0.0%	91	0.3%
TOTAL			2,627,851	718,951	27,35%	1,875,129	71,5%	16,410		17,361	

== Rulers of Moravia ==
- Part of Great Moravia (c. 820–907)

=== Dukes in Moravia (907–1182) ===
==== Přemyslid dynasty as Duke of Bohemia (907–999) ====
Ruler	Born	Reign	Death	Consort	Notes
Spytihněv I	882	907–915	915	Unmarried	First son of Bořivoj I and Ludmila of Bohemia. He restored Bohemian sovereignty in 894, than ruled from 907 over the territory of Moravia too.
Vratislaus I	888	915–921	13 February 921	Drahomíra three children	Second son of Bořivoj I and Ludmila of Bohemia.
Wenceslaus I	907	921–929/935	28 September 929/935	Unmarried	Known as St. Wenceslaus ("Good King Wenceslas" for English-speaking people), the patron saint of the Czech lands. He was the first son of Vratislaus I and Drahomíra. His rule started with the regencies of Ludmila of Bohemia (921) and Drahomíra (921–925)
Boleslaus I the Cruel	915	929/935–972	July 972	Biagota four children	Assassinated his brother to ascend to the ducal throne. He was the second son of Vratislaus I and Drahomíra.
Boleslaus II the Pious	940	972–999	7 February 999	Adiva (of England?) four children Emma of Mělník (Emma of Italy (?)); 989 no children	Son of Boleslaus I and Biagota. He lost Moravia against Poland.

==== Piast dynasty as Duke of Poland (999–1019) ====
Ruler	Born	Reign	Death	Consort	Notes
Boleslaus III the Brave	967	999–1002 1003–1019	17 June 1025	Oda/Hunilda; Judith of Hungary one child Emnilda five children Oda of Meissen one child	Son of Mieszko I of Poland and Doubravka of Bohemia. He conquered Moravia as Duke of Poland in 999, than Bohemia in 1002 and given these territories to his younger brother Vladivoj. After the death of his brother, he ruled over Bohemia and Moravia as Duke of Poland and Bohemia till 1004, than as Duke of Poland over Moravia.
Vladivoj	981	1002–1003	January 1003	Unknown	Son of Mieszko I of Poland and Doubravka of Bohemia. He ruled over Moravia as Duke of Bohemia.

==== Přemyslid dynasty as Duke in Moravia (1019–1182) ====
Ruler	Born	Reign	Death	Ruling part	Consort	Notes
Bretislaus I	1002/5	1019/29–1033 1034–1055	10 January 1055	Moravia	Judith of Schweinfurt; 1020 four children	Son of Ulrich, Duke of Bohemia, who reconquered Moravia from Poland and given to his son.
Ulrich I	975	1033–1034	9 November 1034	Moravia	Unknown no children Božena c. 1002 (morganatic) one child	In his After his death, his son was replaced in Moravia.
Conrad I	c. 1035	1055–1056 1061–1092	6 September 1092	Brno	Wirpirk of Tengling; 1054 two children	Children of Bretislav I, divided their inheritance: Conrad received Brno; Vratislav got Olomouc; Otto inherited Znojmo.; The division was made ineffective by their other brother Spytihnev (1055), who had inherited Bohemia and extended his rule to Moravia, uniting the whole Premyslid domain under his control. However, after Spytihnev's death (1061), the landless brothers recovered the inheritance and divided it differently, as Vratislav had inherited Bohemia: Conrad recovered Brno but also received Otto's share in Znojmo; Otto received Vratislav's part in Olomouc.
Vratislaus I	c. 1035	1055–1056	14 January 1092	Olomouc	Maria before 1057 no children Adelaide of Hungary I 1057 four children Świętosława of Poland; 1062 five children	
Otto I the Fair	1045	1055–1056	9 June 1087	Znojmo	Euphemia of Hungary before 1073 two children	
Otto I the Fair	1045	1056–1087	9 June 1087	Olomouc	Euphemia of Hungary before 1073 two children	
Znojmo annexed to Brno (1056–1092)
Spytihněv II	1031	1056–1061	28 January 1061	Moravia	Ida of Wettin c. 1054 one child	Brother of the three above, ended briefly the division of Moravia, uniting Bohemian and Moravian lands. After his death, his brothers re-split the land.
Boleslaus	1062	1087–1091	11 August 1091	Olomouc	Unmarried	
Svatopluk I the Lion	1075	1091–1109	21 September 1109	Olomouc	Unknown one child	Brother of Boleslaus.
Luitpold I	?	1092–1112	15 March 1112	Znojmo	Ida of Austria one child	Children of Conrad I, divided the inheritance: Luitpold received Znojmo; Ulrich inherited Brno.; Despite having heirs, Luitpold's land came to Ulrich's possession after his death. Conrad II, Luitpold's heir, would come to power in 1123.
Ulrich II	?	1092–1113	5 January 1113	Brno (with Znojmo since 1112)	Adelaide two children	Children of Conrad I, divided the inheritance: Luitpold received Znojmo; Ulrich inherited Brno.; Despite having heirs, Luitpold's land came to Ulrich's possession after his death. Conrad II, Luitpold's heir, would come to power in 1123.
Sobeslaus I	c. 1075	1113–1123	14 February 1140	Brno (with Znojmo)	Adelaide of Hungary II; 1123 five children	Son of Vratislaus I, ruled in Brno and Znojmo, which split after his resign: Znojmo returned to its heir, Conrad II; Brno was absorbed by Olomouc, the other Moravian feud.
Conrad II	c. 1075	1123–1161	14 February 1140	Znojmo	Maria of Serbia; 1132 four children	Son of Vratislaus I.
Otto II the Black	1085	1109–1123	18 February 1126	Olomouc (with Brno since 1123)	Sophia of Berg; 1113 three children	Ruled in Olomouc, since 1091 with his brother Svatopluk. Acquired Brno in 1123.
Wenceslaus Henry	1107	1126–1130	1 March 1130	Olomouc	Unmarried	Son of Svatopluk, inherited Olomouc.
Vratislaus II	c. 1111	1126–1146	1146	Brno	A Russian princess 1132 three children	Son of Ulrich II, inherited Brno.
Luitpold II	1102	1130–1137	1143	Olomouc	Unmarried	Son of Bořivoj II, Duke of Bohemia.
Vladislaus	?	1137–1140	1165	Olomouc	Unmarried	Son of Sobeslaus I.
Otto III	1122	1140–1160	12 May 1160	Olomouc	Durancia five children	Son of Otto II.
Spytihněv III	?	1146?–1182	1199	Brno	Umarried	In 1182 abdicated for Conrad III.
Brno annexed to Znojmo
Frederick I	1142	1160–1173	25 March 1189	Olomouc	Elizabeth of Hungary; 1157 six children	Son of Vladislaus II, Duke of Bohemia.
Ulrich III	1134	1173–1177	18 October 1177	Olomouc	Cecilia of Thuringia no children Sophia of Meissen no children	Son of Soběslav I, Duke of Bohemia.
Wenceslaus	1137	1177–1178	after 1192	Olomouc	Unmarried	Son of Sobeslaus I. Abdicated for Conrad III.
Olomouc annexed to Znojmo
Conrad III Otto	c. 1136	1161–1182	9 September 1191	Znojmo	Hellicha of Wittelsbach before 1176 no children	Son of Conrad II. United Znojmo and Olomouc. Brno joined in 1182, when he also became the first Margrave of Moravia.

=== Margraves of Moravia ===
==== Přemyslid dynasty ====
- Conrad II Otto 1182–1191

united with Bohemia 1189–1197

- Vladislaus I Henry 1197–1222, second son of King Vladislaus II of Bohemia and Judith of Thuringia
- Vladislaus II 1223–1227, son of King Ottokar I of Bohemia and Constance of Hungary
- Přemysl 1227–1239, son of King Ottokar I of Bohemia and Constance of Hungary
- Vladislaus III 1239–1247, son of King Wenceslaus I of Bohemia and Kunigunde of Hohenstaufen
- Ottokar II 1247–1278, son of King Wenceslaus I of Bohemia and Kunigunde of Hohenstaufen

directly held by King Rudolph I of Germany 1278–1283

- Wenceslaus II 1283–1305, son of King Ottokar II of Bohemia and Kunigunda of Halych
- Wenceslaus III 1305–1306, son of King Wenceslaus II of Bohemia and Judith of Habsburg

==== Various dynasties ====
- Rudolf I of Habsburg 1306–1307, son of King Albert I of Germany and Elizabeth of Carinthia
- Henry of Carinthia 1307–1310, son of Duke Meinhard of Carinthia and Elisabeth of Bavaria

==== Luxembourgs ====
- John 1310–1333, son of Emperor Henry VII and Margaret of Brabant
- Charles 1333–1349, son of King John of Bohemia and Elizabeth
- John Henry 1349–1375, enfeoffed by his brother King Charles IV
- Jobst of Moravia 1375–1411, son of John Henry, with his brothers John Sobieslaus (until 1382) and Prokop (until 1405)
- Sigismund 1419–1423, son of Emperor Charles IV and Elizabeth of Pomerania

==== Various dynasties ====
- Albert V of Austria 1423–1439, son-in-law of Sigismund
- Ladislaus the Posthumous 1440–1457, son of Albert and grandson of Sigismund
- George of Poděbrady 1458–1468
- Matthias Corvinus 1468–1490, second son of John Hunyadi and Erzsébet Szilágyi

==== Jagiellons ====
- Vladislaus II 1490–1516, son of King Casimir IV Jagiellon of Poland and Elisabeth of Habsburg
- Louis II 1516–1526, son of King Vladislaus II

==== Habsburgs ====
- Ferdinand I 1527–1564, fourth child of Philip I and Joanna of Castile
- Maximilian II 1564–1576, son of Emperor Ferdinand I and Anne of Bohemia and Hungary
- Rudolf II 1576–1608, son of Emperor Maximilian II
- Matthias II 1608–1617, son of Emperor Maximilian II

Under the united rule of the Bohemian kings from 1611 (see List of rulers of Bohemia).
