= 921 =

Calendar year

921 in various calendars
Gregorian calendar	921; CMXXI
Ab urbe condita	1674
Armenian calendar	370; ԹՎ ՅՀ
Assyrian calendar	5671
Balinese saka calendar	842–843
Bengali calendar	327–328
Berber calendar	1871
Buddhist calendar	1465
Burmese calendar	283
Byzantine calendar	6429–6430
Chinese calendar	庚辰年 (Metal Dragon); 3618 or 3411 — to — 辛巳年 (Metal Snake); 3619 or 3412
Coptic calendar	637–638
Discordian calendar	2087
Ethiopian calendar	913–914
Hebrew calendar	4681–4682
- Hindu calendars
Vikram Samvat	977–978
Shaka Samvat	842–843
Kali Yuga	4021–4022
Holocene calendar	10921
Iranian calendar	299–300
Islamic calendar	308–309
Japanese calendar	Engi 21 (延喜２１年)
Javanese calendar	820–821
Julian calendar	921; CMXXI
Korean calendar	3254
Minguo calendar	991 before ROC 民前991年
Nanakshahi calendar	−547
Seleucid era	1232/1233 AG
Thai solar calendar	1463–1464
Tibetan calendar	ལྕགས་ཕོ་འབྲུག་ལོ་ (male Iron-Dragon); 1047 or 666 or −106 — to — ལྕགས་མོ་སྦྲུལ་ལོ་ (female Iron-Snake); 1048 or 667 or −105

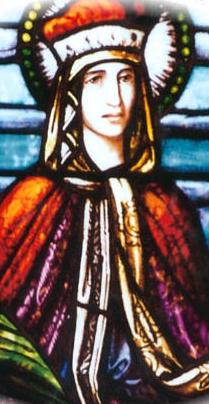
Ludmila of Bohemia (c. 860–921)

Year 921 (CMXXI) was a common year starting on Monday of the Julian calendar.

== Events ==
=== By place ===
==== Byzantine Empire ====
- March – Battle of Pegae: Bulgarian forces under kavhan (first minister) Theodore Sigritsa defeat the Byzantine army at the outskirts of Constantinople. After the battle, the Bulgarians burn the palaces in Pegae ("the Spring"), and devastate the area north of the Golden Horn.

==== Europe ====
- Summer – King Henry I (the Fowler) defeats his rival Arnulf I (the Bad), duke of Bavaria, in two campaigns. Arnulf is besieged at Regensburg and forced to accept peace negotiations, recognising Henry as sole sovereign of the East Frankish Kingdom (Germany).
- Landulf I, prince of Benevento, supports an anti-Greek Apulian rebellion, ravaging several Byzantine strongpoints as far as Ascoli. The Apulian nobility, professing loyalty to the Byzantine Empire, appoints Landulf as stratego of the Theme of Longobardia.
- September 15 – Ludmila, Bohemian duchess and widow of Bořivoj I, is murdered by her daughter-in-law Drahomíra at Tetín (modern Czech Republic). Ludmila will be canonised and become the patron saint of Bohemia and is venerated in the Orthodox and the Catholic Churches.
- November 7 – Treaty of Bonn: King Charles III (the Simple) and Henry I sign a peace treaty or 'pact of friendship' (amicitia) at a ceremony aboard a ship in the middle of the Rhine, recognising the border between their two Frankish kingdoms.
- A Hungarian mercenary force led by Dursac and Bogát defeats an army of insurgents, who plans to overthrow their ally, Emperor Berengar I, at Brescia.

==== Arabian Empire ====
- June 21 – A diplomatic delegation is sent from Baghdad to establish trade routes between the Abbasid Caliphate towards Bukhara (modern Uzbekistan). Ahmad ibn Fadlan, an Arab diplomat and traveller, makes contact with Almış, the İltäbär (vassal-king under the Khazars) of Volga Bulgaria, on behalf of Caliph al-Muqtadir.
- Battle of Sevan: Sajid forces under Yusuf Beshir invade Armenia and besiege King Ashot II near Lake Sevan. After gathering a small force he attacks Beshir's camps and drives the enemy out of the country. Ashot starts a counter-offensive to rebuild the ruined cities and fortresses.

==== Africa ====
- The Fatimid Caliphate crushes Idrisid forces in battle, capturing the cities of Tlemcen and Fez.
- The Fatimid Caliphate creates a new capital in Ifriqiya, al-Mahdiya on the Tunisian coast.

==== China ====
- The Later Liang Dynasty reports that all "barbarian" tribes have been pacified by the Khitan Empire.

== Births ==
- February 21 – Abe no Seimei, Japanese astrologer (d. 1005)
- October 9 – Li Chun'an, Chinese merchant (d. 999)
- October 27 – Chai Rong, emperor of Later Zhou (d. 959)
- Edmund I (the Magnificent), king of England (d. 946)
- Ja'far ibn al-Furat, Ikhshidid and Fatimid vizier (d. 1001)
- Louis IV, king of the West Frankish Kingdom (or 920)
- Ōnakatomi no Yoshinobu, Japanese nobleman (d. 991)

== Deaths ==
- February 13 – Vratislaus I, duke of Bohemia
- September 15 – Ludmila, Bohemian duchess
- Alexios Mosele, Byzantine admiral
- Elvira Menéndez, queen of Galicia and León
- Harusindan, ruler of the Gilites (Iran)
- Lili ibn al-Nu'man, ruler of the Gilites
- Liu Xun, general of Later Liang (b. 858)
- Ragnall ua Ímair, Viking king of Northumbria
- Richard, duke of Burgundy (b. 858)
- Wang Rong, Chinese warlord (b. 877)
