= Spytihněv I of Bohemia =

Duke of Bohemia from 889 to 915

Spytihněv I
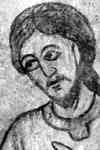
- Fresco, Rotunda of Saint Catherine, Znojmo

Duke of Bohemia
- Reign: 889 – 915
- Predecessor: Bořivoj I
- Successor: Vratislaus I
- Born: 882
- Died: 915 (aged 33)
- Burial: probably Church of the Virgin Mary
- Dynasty: Přemyslid
- Father: Bořivoj I
- Mother: Ludmila

Spytihněv I (c. 875 – 915), a member of the Přemyslid dynasty, was Duke of Bohemia from 889 (under regency until 894 or 895) until his death in 915.

== Life ==
He was the eldest son of Duke Bořivoj I, the first historically documented Bohemian ruler, and his wife Ludmila. Because Spytihněv and his younger brother Vratislaus were still minors at the time of their father's death about 889, the Bohemian lands were placed under the regency of their suzerain, the Great Moravian ruler Svatopluk I.

After Svatopluk died in 894, an inheritance conflict arose between his sons Mojmír II and Svatopluk II. Spytihněv took advantage of the situation to free himself from Moravian vassalage. According to the Frankish chronicle Annales Fuldenses, he appeared with another Bohemian duke Witizla at the Imperial Diet (Reichstag) in Regensburg in 895 and paid homage to the East Frankish King Arnulf of Carinthia. This was an important first step in detaching Bohemia from Moravian rule. He reinforced Přemyslid rule in Central Bohemia around present-day Prague, having several castles erected along the borders of his realm at Mělník, Libušín, Tetín, Lštění, and Boleslav. He also continued the extension of Prague Castle as the administrative centre of the rising Přemyslid duchy as a replacement for the early medieval gord of Levý Hradec.

Spytihněv further strengthened ties with East Francia by forming an alliance with Margrave Luitpold of Bavaria, who in 898 fought against Mojmír II with the result that Bohemia finally separated from the Greater Moravian realm. Designed to protect Bohemia against the ravages of Hungarian invasions, the alliance with East Francia also opened Bohemia to Carolingian culture and paved the way for the eventual triumph of Roman Catholicism in Czech spiritual affairs.

He was confirmed to buried in the Church of the Virgin Mary in Prague Castle, as were many members of the royal Přemyslid dynasty during this period.

== DNA ==
DNA testing on his remains suggests the Přemysl family's Y-haplogroup was R1b, common to Western Europe and Czech Republic.

Spytihněv I of Bohemia Přemyslid dynasty Born: c. 875 Died: 915
Preceded by Bořivoj I	Duke of Bohemia c. 889–915	Succeeded by Vratislaus I
