= Mojslav =

Mojslav (Latin: Moyslan or Myslan; born and died in the 9th century) was a Czech prince. He participated in the Battle of the Vltava and was likely the father of Saint Dobroslava.

== Life ==
The Annals of Fulda mention him in 872, during the Battle of the Vltava, where Czech forces led by five princes, including Mojslav, clashed with the Franks. The Czechs ultimately suffered a defeat, and those who managed to escape sought refuge in nearby fortresses.

It is possible that Prince Mojslav was injured or even killed during this skirmish. No other written sources concerning Mojslav are known.

There has also been speculation about his kinship with the first documented Přemyslid ruler, Bořivoj I, but there is no historical evidence to support this theory. According to a Russian dictionary of historical Slavic names, Mojslav was not a Czech but a prince of the White Croats, who at that time lived in northeastern Bohemia and northern Moravia.
