= Boleslaus I of Bohemia =

Duke of Bohemia from 935 to 972

Boleslaus I
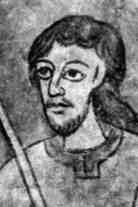
- Fresco of Boleslaus I in the Znojmo Rotunda

Duke of Bohemia
- Reign: September 935 – 15 July 967/972
- Predecessor: Wenceslaus I
- Successor: Boleslaus II
- Born: 915
- Died: 972 (aged 57)
- Spouse: Biagota
- Issue: Doubravka of Bohemia; Boleslaus II, Duke of Bohemia; Strachkvas; Mlada
- Dynasty: Přemyslid
- Father: Vratislaus I, Duke of Bohemia
- Mother: Drahomíra

Boleslaus I (Czech: Boleslav I. Ukrutný; 915–972), a member of the Přemyslid dynasty, was ruler (kníže, "prince") of the Duchy of Bohemia from 935 until his death in 972. He is notorious for the murder of his elder brother Wenceslaus I, through which he became duke. As duke, his decisions surrounding his dynasty led to the Roman Catholic conversion of Poland, which in turn led to the recognition of the Polish state by the papacy. This recognition helped to define medieval Poland as one of the first modern states.

Boleslaus I is generally respected by Czech historians as an energetic ruler who significantly strengthened the Bohemian state and expanded its territory. This perspective is fairly modern, as Boleslaus was often overshadowed by his brother Wenceslaus in terms of historical legacy. Certain medieval historians, notably Cosmas of Prague, overtly present Boleslaus as a cruel figure, particularly after the death of his brother. Over time, this perspective has evolved as modern historians have acknowledged Boleslaus' accomplishments as Duke through a more historically objective lens.

According to Cosmas, Duke Boleslaus I died on 15 July 967, a date questioned by modern researchers. He was succeeded by his eldest son, Boleslaus II (also known as Boleslaus the Pious).

== Early life ==
=== Family and the Přemyslid dynasty ===
Boleslaus was the son of Duke Vratislaus I of Bohemia (d. 921) and Drahomíra (d. 934), who was likely a Hevellian princess. Vratislaus took over the rule in Prague around the time of Boleslaus' birth, during which he had to manage both the exertion of influence by the East Frankish dukes of Bavaria and Saxony and the Magyar incursions.

Vratislaus (and, by extension, Boleslaus) was part of the Přemyslid dynasty which had ruled the Duchy of Bohemia since c. 870. In the early years of the dynasty, Bořivoj I became Bohemia's first duke to be baptized into the Roman Catholic religion, beginning a Catholic ruling style that would continue throughout the reigns of proceeding rulers. Vratislaus I was a Catholic ruler similar to his predecessors, focused on maintaining Bohemian peace and converting the land to Roman Catholicism. He raised his two sons, Wenceslaus I and Boleslaus I, in Catholicism, influencing their future reigns.

=== Religion ===
Boleslaus I and his elder brother Wenceslaus were taught the Roman Catholic faith and to read the Psalms by their grandmother Ludmila. There is evidence that Boleslaus's mother Drahomíra, who was pagan, might have influenced him against his brother and Catholicism, though he later repented.

== Rise to power ==
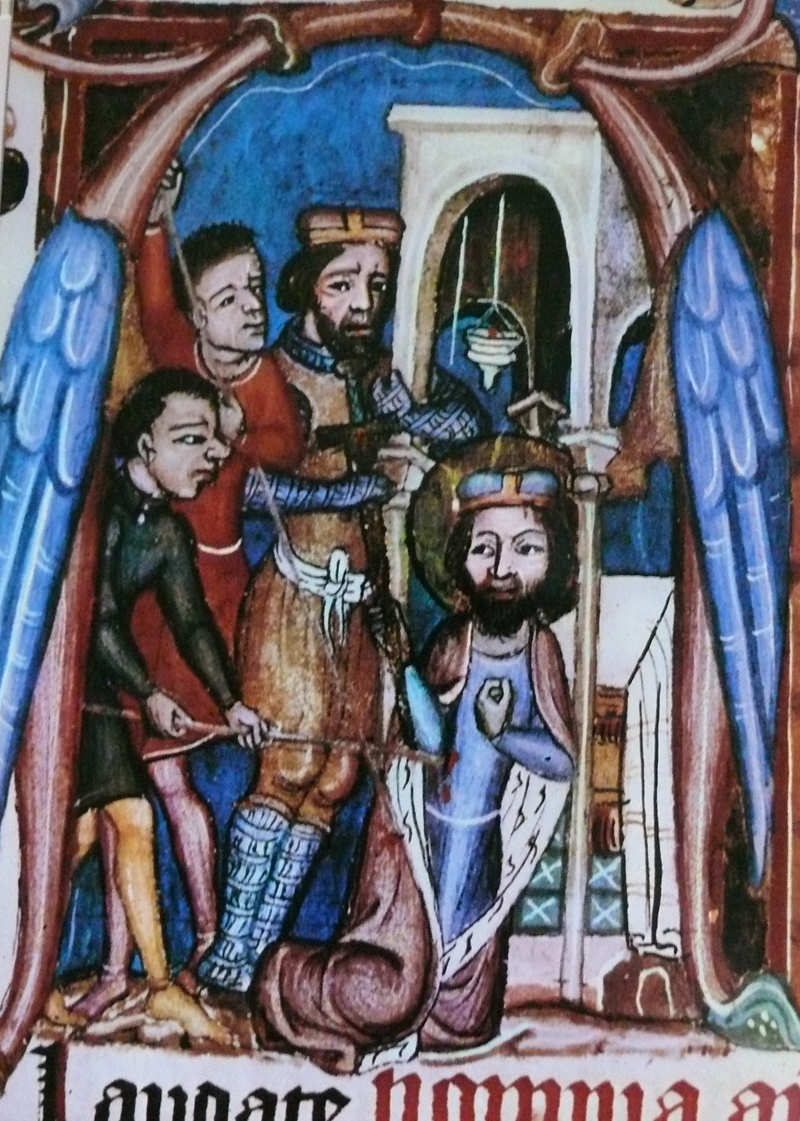
Murder of Duke Wenceslaus, Liber viaticus (14th century)

=== Frankish invasion of Henry I ===
Upon his death, Duke Vratislaus was succeeded by his eldest son Wenceslaus. While the external situation worsened with the alliance between Duke Arnulf of Bavaria and the Saxon duke Henry I (also known as Henry the Fowler), King of East Francia from 919, Wenceslaus could only maintain his independence by entering an agreement to pay an annual tribute to the East Frankish (German) ruler.

As part of a 929 CE military campaign, Henry I led a march into Prague. In response, Wenceslaus surrendered almost immediately, reaffirming Frankish dominance in the region. Wenceslaus’ surrender would not have been surprising given his pacifist upbringing and the reputation of the Přemyslid dynasty as nonviolent rulers.

=== Assassination of Duke Wenceslaus I ===
In 935 (or in 929, according to other sources), Wenceslaus was murdered at Stará Boleslav after accepting an invitation from Boleslaus to celebrate the feast of Saints Cosmas and Damian with him there. Historians are uncertain of Boleslaus I's motives for the assassination, but argue it was likely a desire for power, the influence of his pagan mother, or to put an end to Wenceslaus I's political plans. Regardless of his specific motive, it was a planned political move that put Boleslaus I in power as Duke of Bohemia and opened the door for immense changes in the ruling style of the Přemyslid Dynasty.

After the assassination, a cult promoting Wenceslaus’ martyrdom immediately grew and the late duke was canonized. Some historians claim that Boleslaus played a large role in promoting the cult because the sacredness of the canonization would be an advantage to his rule. The violent murder of his predecessor indicates a shift away from the peaceful ruling of the Přemyslid Dynasty until this point, but the canonization confirmed Boleslaus I and the Přemyslid Dynasty's kept ties with the Roman Catholic Church, illustrating the complex rule of Boleslaus I.

== Reign ==
=== War with Otto I ===
Under Boleslaus's rule, Bohemia renounced the rule of the Eastern Franks' raging war with Otto the Great, the eldest son of Henry I. This war rejuvenated a newfound sense of unity within the kingdom as they came together to fight against the East Frankish Empire pushing them out of Prague. Boleslaus stopped the payment shortly after he ascended the throne, which led to this war with King Otto. In 935, Boleslaus attacked the Thuringian allies of the Saxons in the northwest and defeated two of Otto's armies (from Thuringia and Merseburg). The war then deteriorated to border raids (the general pattern of warfare in this region at the time) and reached its conclusion in 950, when King Otto besieged a castle owned by Boleslaus's son, Boleslaus II. This prompted Boleslaus to sign a peace treaty with Otto. Although he remained undefeated, he promised to resume the payment of tribute. However, because of his success against the Eastern Franks, Boleslaus would become a great ally to Otto the Great in his later conquest.

=== Military conquests ===
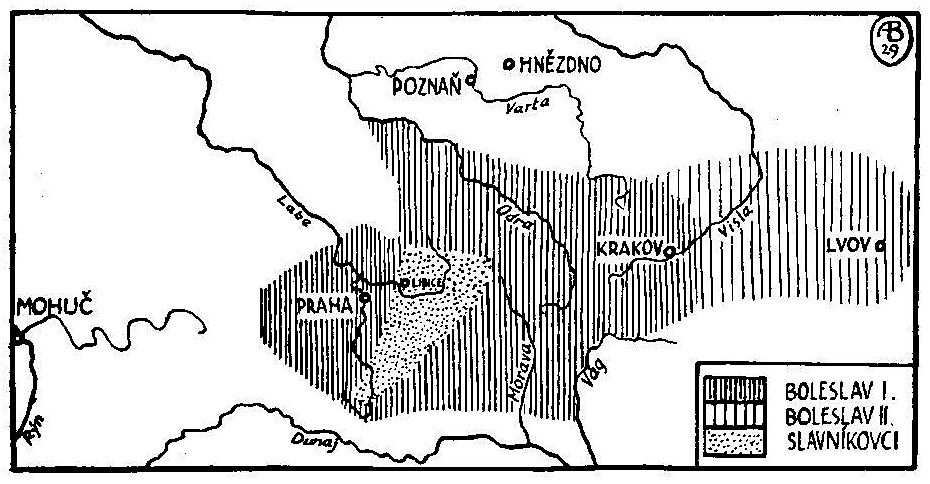
Expansion of the Bohemian state during the reign of Boleslaus I and Boleslaus II

Five years after the war with Otto, Boleslaus and the armies of the Bohemians and Franks allied against the Magyars in the victorious Battle of Lechfeld. After the battle, the remainder of the huge Magyar army turned to Bohemia, where it was crushed by Boleslaus. He had also helped Otto to crush an uprising of Slavic tribes led by the Obotrite princes Nakon and Stojgněv on the Lower Elbe river in the Battle on the Raxa. The defeat of the invading Hungarians brought the same benefits to both Franks and Bohemians. Less obvious is what Boleslaus expected to gain from his participation in Otto's war against the Obotrite princes in the far north. He probably wanted to ensure that his powerful Frankish neighbors did not interfere with him in expanding the Bohemian territories to the east. As a result of the victory, Boleslaus freed the Moravian lands from Magyar raids and expanded his territory, which in turn was later conquered by Polish dukes and became known as Upper Silesia and Lesser Poland. By occupying the city of Kraków, he controlled important trade routes from Prague to Kiev and Lviv. He even allied with Mieszko in the campaign against the Saxon count Wichmann the Younger. Boleslaus was ambitious in his conquest gaining many new territories for Bohemia. It was under Boleslaus that the “hradská soustava” system was created. In this system, strongholds are built all along the countryside. These strongholds were integral for keeping governance over the land, each castle holding importance whether militaristic, political, or religious. As the Bohemian territory expanded, so did the expansion of Christianity in those territories.

=== Religious expansion ===
Despite his violent rise to power and aggressive ruling style that differed heavily from his predecessors, Boleslaus I kept strong ties with the Roman Catholic Church throughout his reign and played a part in further Catholicizing Eastern Europe. Similarly to his predecessors, Duke Boleslaus I had several religious institutions built throughout Bohemia. This is not only a sign of his commitment to Catholicism but monasteries also supported Bohemia through an elevated economy and the keeping of records, books, and manuscripts which are often written in monasteries.

Duke Boleslaus I made many alliances throughout his reign, and his alliance with Prince Mieszco I is often accredited with converting Poland to Roman Catholicism. The alliance between Bohemia and Poland was built through the marriage of Boleslaus I's daughter, Doubravka, to Prince Miezco I of Poland. Doubravka refused to marry the Prince of Poland unless he converted to Catholicism which he eventually did. This marriage was not only a strong political move to create an alliance between Bohemia and Poland but also a move to further the Roman Catholic conversion of Eastern Europe.

=== Economy and trade ===
Under Boleslaus I, Prague was a major trading center and wealthy city. A narrative from a traveling Jewish merchant illustrates a prosperous city that traded goods as well as some form of cash. Flour, tin, slaves, and furs were desired among the Rus, Slavs, Turks, and Jews who are recorded to have traveled to Bohemia to trade for these goods. During the reign of the Boleslaus I, Prague was a production center as well, producing items like saddles, bridles, and shields. Bohemia also produced kerchiefs which were very thin and of no functional use but were used as precious items for trading. The expansive system of trade and production in Prague indicates cultural connections and foreign relationships that existed during the reign of Boleslaus I. Trading with foreign lands and people likely contributed to the spread of Christianity to Bohemia's trading partners, further indicating a focus on Christianization under the rule of Boleslaus I. Boleslaus I and his predecessors are also known to have built churches, monasteries, and strongholds in the city of Prague. Medieval religious institutions were very wealthy and important in building both the city and Bohemia's population and economy. The growing economic strength Bohemia while Duke Boleslaus I was in power built stability and influence which he would use in his efforts to centralize Bohemian power.

== Marriage and children ==
Boleslaus' wife may have been Biagota. It is unknown if she was the mother of all four of his adult children:

=== Doubravka of Bohemia ===
To defuse the Bohemian-Polish conflict, Duke Boleslaus married his daughter Doubravka to the pagan Piast prince Mieszko I in 963/964. As a devout Christian, Doubravka refused to marry the prince unless he converted to Christianity. Contemporary historians claim that Doubravka refused to marry the prince unless he converted to Christianity, waiting until Prince Mieszko I was baptized into the Christian Church to marry him. This marriage played a key role in the Christianization of Poland and set up a strong alliance between Bohemia and Poland.

=== Boleslaus II, Duke of Bohemia ===
After the death of Boleslaus I, he was succeeded as Duke by his son, Boleslaus II. Boleslaus II had a much kinder reputation than that of his father, possibly because of his strong Christian faith and philanthropy towards the church in the region.

=== Strachkvas of Bohemia ===
According to tradition, a son of Boleslaus I was born at exactly the same time that Wenceslaus was killed. The child was given the name "Strachkvas", which means "a dreadful feast". Remorseful of the killing of his brother, Boleslaus promised to have Strachkvas educated as a clergyman and devote his life to religion.

=== Mlada of Bohemia ===
Boleslaus I's daughter, Mlada, was raised as a devout Christian, allegedly having close ties with the pope, and was taught monastic discipline. She was consecrated abbess, changed her name to Mary, and was admitted to the Order of Saint Benedict, making her the first abbess of the monastery of St. George in Prague Castle.

== Sources ==
- Ancestral Roots of Certain American Colonists Who Came to America Before 1700 by Frederick Lewis Weis; Line 244–7
- The Plantagenet Ancestry by William Henry Turton, Page 85

Boleslaus I of Bohemia Přemyslid dynasty Born: c. 908 or 910 Died: 967 or 972
Preceded by Wenceslaus I	Duke of Bohemia; 935–972	Succeeded by Boleslaus II
