= Drahomíra =

Duchess consort of Bohemia

- Duchess consort of Bohemia
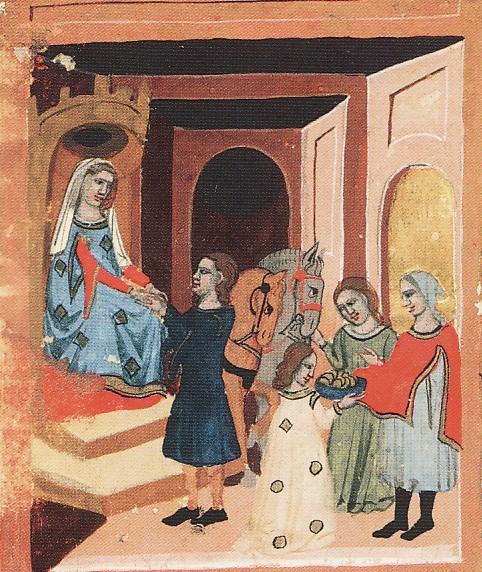
- Drahomíra hiring the assassins of Saint Ludmila, Chronicle of Dalimil, c. 1330
- Reign: 915–921
- Born: c. 877 or 890
- Died: after 934 or 936
- Spouse: Vratislaus I, Duke of Bohemia
- Issue: Wenceslaus I, Duke of Bohemia; Boleslaus I, Duke of Bohemia; Střezislava (?)
- Father: Boleslaw Hevelli Stodoransky - prince of Hevelli

Drahomíra of Stodor (Czech: Drahomíra ze Stodor; c. 877 or 890 – died after 934 or 936) was Duchess consort of Bohemia from 915 to 921, wife of the Přemyslid duke Vratislaus I. She also acted as regent of the Duchy of Bohemia from 921 to 924 during the minority of her son Wenceslaus. She is chiefly known for the murder of her mother-in-law Ludmila of Bohemia by hired assassins.

== Life ==
Drahomíra was born in the present-day Havelland region centered around the fortress of Brandenburg (Brennabor), the daughter of a Hevelli (Stodoran) prince. According to Cosmas of Prague, she married Duke Vratislaus I of Bohemia about 906. Drahomíra gave birth to at least six children: her sons were Wenceslaus and Boleslaus, who both succeeded their father as Bohemian dukes. Among her four daughters was one Přibislava, who is considered to have married to a Croatian prince, who became a nun at the St. George's Convent in Prague, and possibly Střezislava, the wife of the Bohemian-Croatian nobleman Slavník, founder of the Slavník dynasty. The marriage led the Přemyslid dynasty to cooperation with the Polabian Slavs and brought Bohemia in conflict with the Saxon duke Henry the Fowler, who became German king in 919 and later waged war against the Hevelli tribes.

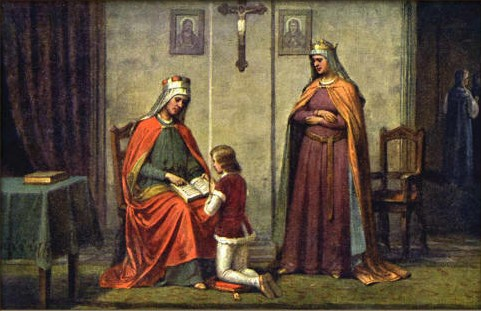
Ludmila and Drahomíra with young Wenceslaus, 19th-century painting

After her husband's untimely death in 921, the Bohemian nobles designated Drahomíra regent for her minor son Wenceslaus. However, she had to divide the government of Bohemia with her mother-in-law Ludmila, widow of Duke Bořivoj I, who took over the religious education of her sons. Popular history depicts Ludmila as a restrained and pious grandmother.

Wenceslaus was one of the main reasons for the eventually fatal discord between Drahomíra and Ludmila, who had exerted great influence over Drahomíra's eldest son, leaving Drahomíra to concentrate her efforts on her younger son, Boleslaus. Despite or perhaps as a result of her political and personal efforts, Ludmila attracted Drahomíra's bitter enmity. She alleged that her mother-in-law, with the help of Bavarian missionaries, educated Wenceslaus to become a monk rather than a prince. Moreover, the two women may have disagreed whether to recognise the East Frankish supremacy of Henry the Fowler. Ludmila fled from Prague to Tetín Castle on the road to Regensburg, where on 16 September 921 Drahomíra's henchmen, Tunna and Gommon, attacked and strangled her.

The next year the troops of Duke Arnulf of Bavaria raided the Bohemian duchy. When Drahomíra's son Wenceslaus came of age about 922, he sent his mother into exile, though he called her back in 925. She spent her later years in Prague; however, upon the murder of her son she fled from the court to the Croats. While some considered that the Croats lived near Prague, others noted that in the case of noble and royal fugitives tried to find security as distant as possible, indicating these Croats probably were located more to the East around Vistula valley.

== In popular culture ==
She is the subject of two operas, Drahomíra by František Škroup (1848), and Drahomíra by Karel Šebor (1867).

== Bibliography ==
- Ancestral Roots of Certain American Colonists Who Came to America Before 1700 by Frederick Lewis Weis; Line 244–7

Royal titles
Preceded by Ludmila of Bohemia	Duchess consort of Bohemia ca. 915–921	Succeeded by Biagota
