= Church of the Virgin Mary (Prague Castle) =

Coordinates: 50°5′26″N 14°23′58″E

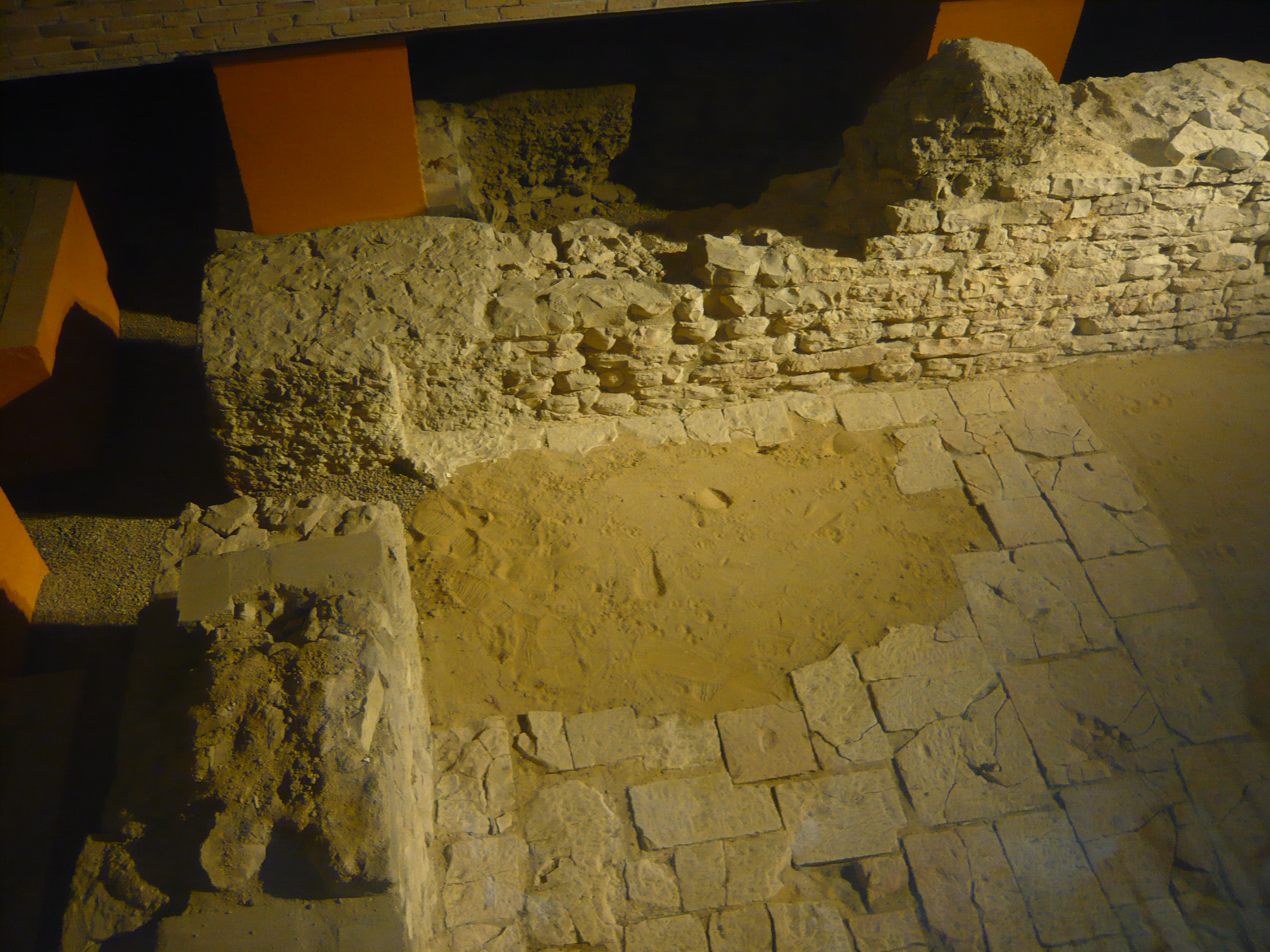
Ruins of the Church of the Virgin Mary

The Church of the Virgin Mary (Czech: Kostel Panny Marie) was the first known church built in the current area of the Prague Castle. The structure was built by Prince Borivoj I after 884, making it not only the oldest church in Prague Castle but also the second oldest in Bohemia, after the Church of St. Clement in Levý Hradec. The church was rebuilt after a fire in the 11th century, but was eventually destroyed again in the 13th century and not rebuilt; it is known today due to excavations directly under extant administrative buildings. The surviving foundations indicate a rectangular nave and a semicircular apse; archaeological surveys uncovered tombs for members of the royal Přemyslid dynasty which was prominent in Bohemia during the early Christian era.

== Burials (probable) ==
- Spytihněv I, Duke of Bohemia

== Bibliography ==
- Ivo Štefan and Martin Wihoda (eds.), Kostel Panny Marie na Pražském hradě. Dialog nad počátky křesťanství v Čechách, Praha: NLN, 2018.
