= Wenceslaus I, Duke of Bohemia =

Duke of Bohemia from 921 to 935

Wenceslaus I
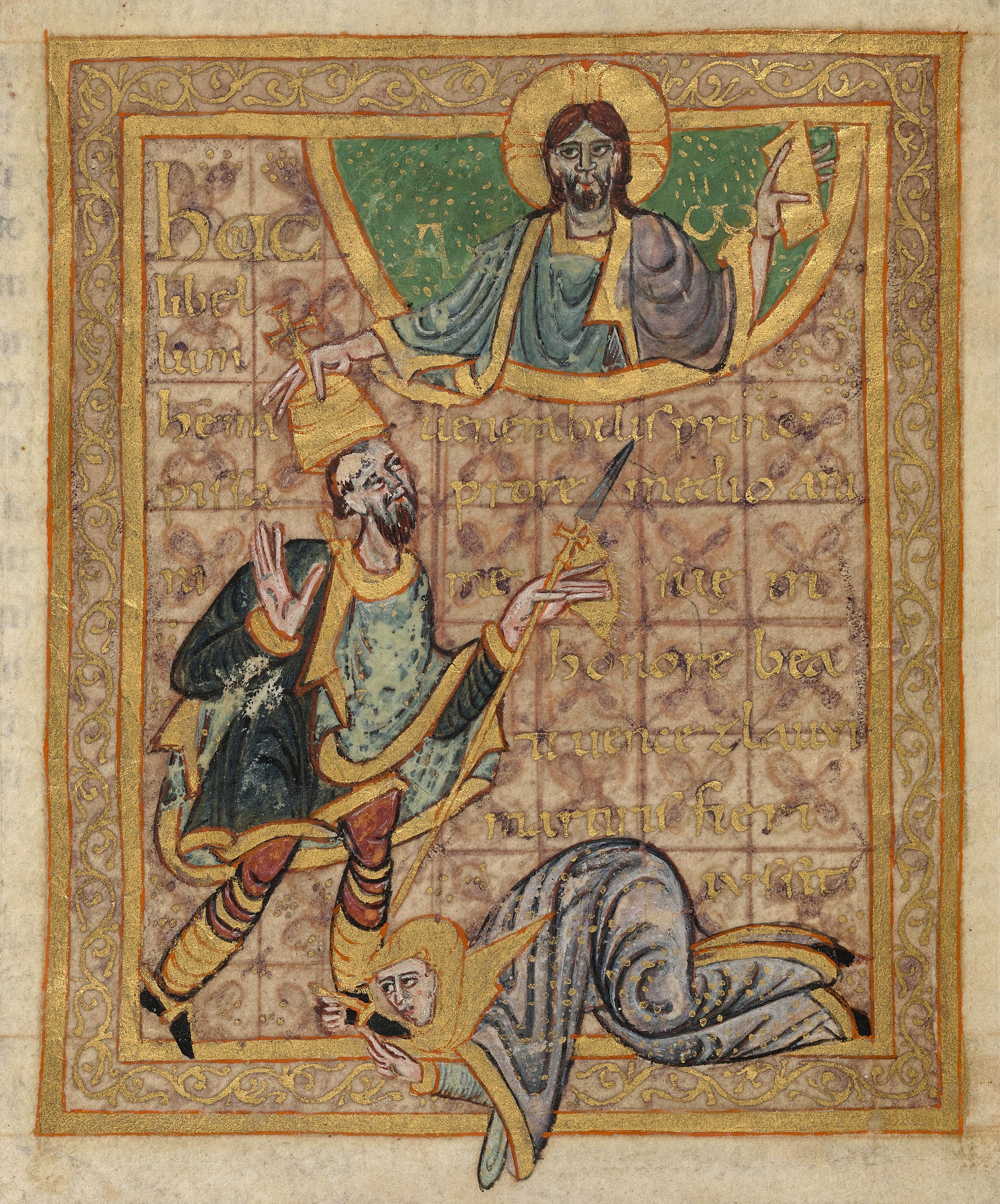
- Wenceslaus adored by his niece-in-law Emma (from the 10th-century Gumpold's Codex)

Duke of Bohemia
- Reign: 13 February 921 − 28 September 935 or 929
- Predecessor: Vratislaus I
- Successor: Boleslaus I
- Born: c. 907 (Note: Most frequently cited year of birth; other cited years are 908 or 911.); Stochov, (Note: According to legend; otherwise the place of birth is unknown.) Bohemia
- Died: 28 September 935 (aged c. 28) or 28 September 929 (aged c. 22); Stará Boleslav, Bohemia
- Burial: Basilica of St. Wenceslaus in Stará Boleslav, St. Vitus Cathedral in Prague
- House: Přemyslid
- Father: Vratislaus I
- Mother: Drahomíra
- Religion: Chalcedonian Christianity

Wenceslaus I (Czech: Václav [ˈvaːtslaf]; c. 907 – 28 September 935), Wenceslas I or Václav the Good was the Prince (kníže) of Bohemia from 921 until his death, probably in 935. According to the legend, he was assassinated by his younger brother, Boleslaus the Cruel.

His martyrdom and the popularity of several biographies gave rise to a reputation for heroic virtue that resulted in his sainthood. He was posthumously declared to be a king and patron saint of the Czech state. He is the subject of the well-known "Good King Wenceslas", a carol for Saint Stephen's Day.

== Biography ==
Wenceslaus was the son of Vratislaus I, Duke of Bohemia from the Přemyslid dynasty. His grandfather, Bořivoj I of Bohemia, and grandmother, Ludmila, had been converted by Cyril and Methodius to Byzantine Christianity in a still unified Christendom, before the Great Schism. His mother, Drahomíra, was the daughter of a chief of the Havelli, but was baptized at the time of her marriage. His paternal grandmother, Ludmila of Bohemia, saw to it that he was educated in the Old Church Slavonic liturgical language and, at an early age, Wenceslaus was sent to the college at Budeč.

In 921, when Wenceslaus was about 13, his father died and his grandmother became regent. Jealous of the influence Ludmila wielded over Wenceslaus, Drahomíra arranged to have her killed. Ludmila was at Tetín Castle near Beroun when assassins murdered her on 15 September 921. She is said to have been strangled by them with her veil. She was at first buried in the church of St. Michael at Tetín, but her remains were later removed, probably by Wenceslaus, to the church of St. George in Prague, which had been built by his father.

Drahomíra then assumed the role of regent and immediately initiated measures against Christians. When Wenceslaus was 18, those Christian nobles who remained rebelled against Drahomira. The uprising was successful, and Drahomira was sent into exile to Budeč.

=== Reign ===
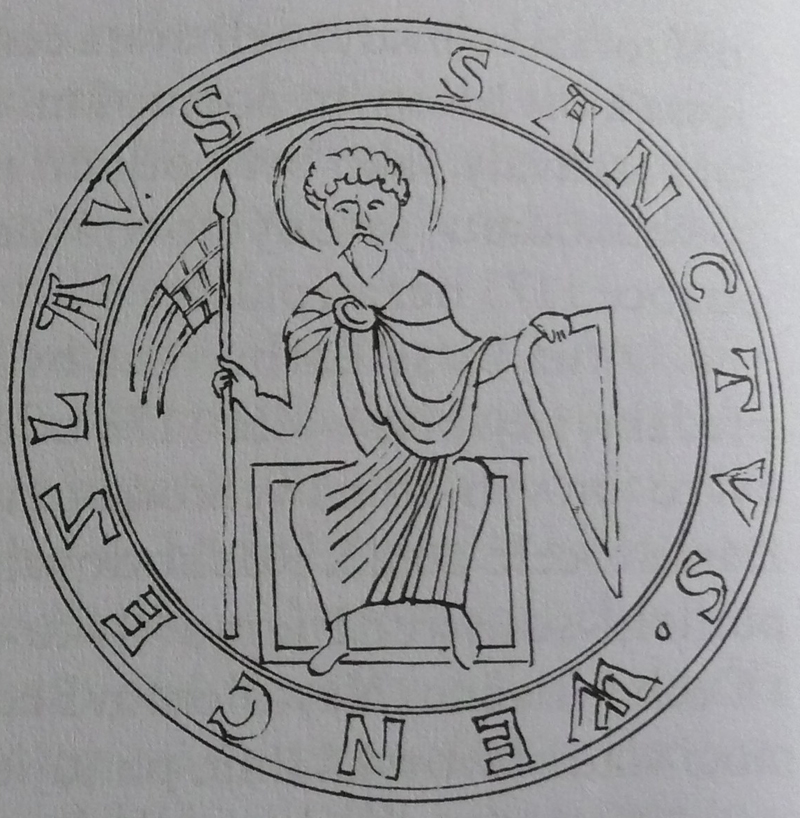
Seal of Wenceslaus I

With the nobles' support, Wenceslaus took control of the government. He reined in the dependent dukes who had become restive under the regency and used Christianity to strengthen his state.

After the fall of Great Moravia, rulers of the Bohemian Duchy had to deal both with continuous raids by the Magyars and the forces of the Saxon and East Frankish king Henry the Fowler, who had started several eastern campaigns into the adjacent lands of the Polabian Slavs, Wenceslaus's mother's homeland. To withstand Saxon overlordship, Wenceslaus's father Vratislaus had forged an alliance with the Bavarian duke Arnulf, a fierce opponent of King Henry at that time. The alliance became worthless when Arnulf and Henry reconciled at Regensburg in 921.

Early in 929, the joint forces of Duke Arnulf of Bavaria and King Henry I the Fowler reached Prague in a sudden attack that forced Wenceslaus to resume payment of a tribute first imposed by the East Frankish king Arnulf of Carinthia in 895. Henry had been forced to pay a huge tribute to the Magyars in 926 and needed the Bohemian tribute, which Wenceslaus probably refused to pay after Arnulf and Henry reconciled. Another possible reason for the attack was the formation of the anti-Saxon alliance between Bohemia, the Polabian Slavs, and the Magyars.

Wenceslaus introduced German priests into his realm and favoured the Latin rite instead of the old Slavic, which had gone into disuse in many places for want of priests. He also founded a rotunda consecrated to St. Vitus at Prague Castle in Prague that was the basis of present-day St. Vitus Cathedral.

=== Assassination ===
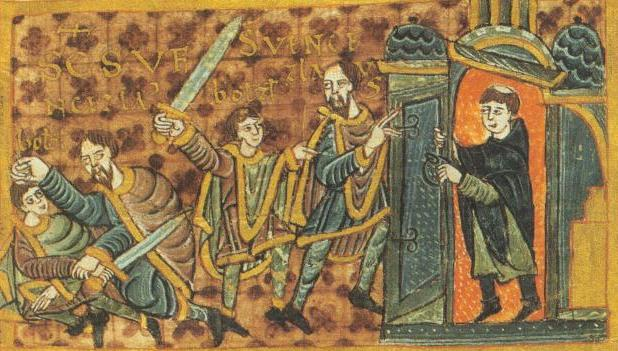
Wenceslaus flees from his brother who is wielding a sword, but the priest closes the door of the church (from Gumpold's Codex)

In September 935, a group of nobles allied with Wenceslaus's younger brother Boleslav plotted to kill him. After Boleslav invited Wenceslaus to a celebration of the feast of Saints Cosmas and Damian in Stará Boleslav, three of Boleslav's companions (Tira, Česta, and Hněvsa) fell on the duke and stabbed him to death. As the duke fell, Boleslav ran him through with a lance.

According to Cosmas of Prague's Chronica Boëmorum of the early 12th century, one of Boleslav's sons was born on the day of Wenceslaus's death. Because of the ominous circumstance of his birth, the infant was named Strachkvas, which means "a dreadful feast".

There is also a tradition that Wenceslaus's loyal servant Podevin avenged his death by killing one of the chief conspirators, an act for which Boleslav executed him.

Wenceslaus's assassination has been characterized as an important turning point in early Bohemian history, as the rule of Boleslav I saw him renounce the Franks, centralize power in Bohemia, and expand the territory of the polity.

== Veneration ==
Saint Wenceslaus
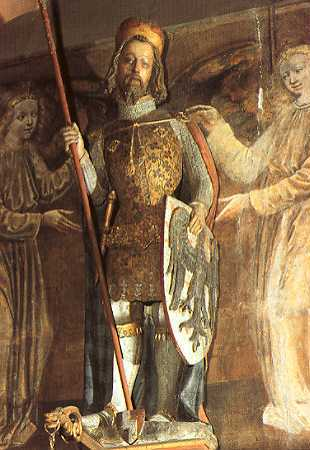
- Statue of Saint Wenceslaus in St. Vitus Cathedral, Prague

Martyr
- Born: c. 907; Prague, Bohemia
- Died: 28 September 935; Stará Boleslav, Bohemia
- Venerated in: Catholic Church and Eastern Orthodox Church
- Major shrine: St. Vitus Cathedral, Prague
- Feast: 28 September
- Attributes: Crown, dagger, burning eagle on a banner
- Patronage: Prague, Bohemia, Czech Republic

Wenceslaus was considered a martyr and saint immediately after his death, when a cult of Wenceslaus arose in Bohemia. Within a few decades, four biographies of him were in circulation. These hagiographies had a powerful influence on the High Middle Ages concept of the rex justus (righteous king), a monarch whose power stems mainly from his great piety as well as his princely vigor.

Referring approvingly to these hagiographies, the chronicler Cosmas of Prague wrote circa 1119:

But his deeds I think you know better than I could tell you; for, as is read in his Passion, no one doubts that, rising every night from his noble bed, with bare feet and only one chamberlain, he went around to God’s churches and gave alms generously to widows, orphans, those in prison and afflicted by every difficulty, so much so that he was considered, not a prince, but the father of all the wretched.

Several centuries later, Pope Pius II asserted this legend as fact.

Although Wenceslaus was only a duke during his lifetime, Holy Roman Emperor Otto I posthumously "conferred on him the regal dignity and title", which is why he is referred to as "king" in legend and song.

The hymn "Svatý Václave" (Saint Wenceslaus) or "Saint Wenceslas Chorale" is one of the oldest known Czech songs. Traceable to the 12th century, it is still among the most popular religious songs in the Bohemian lands. In 1918, at the founding of the modern Czechoslovak state, the song was discussed as a possible national anthem. During the Nazi occupation, it was often played along with the Czech anthem.

Wenceslaus's feast day is celebrated on September 28. On this day, celebrations and a pilgrimage are held in the city of Stará Boleslav, whereas the translation of his relics, which took place in 938, is commemorated on 4 March. Since 2000, the September 28 feast day has been a public holiday in the Czech Republic, celebrated as Czech Statehood Day.

=== In legend ===
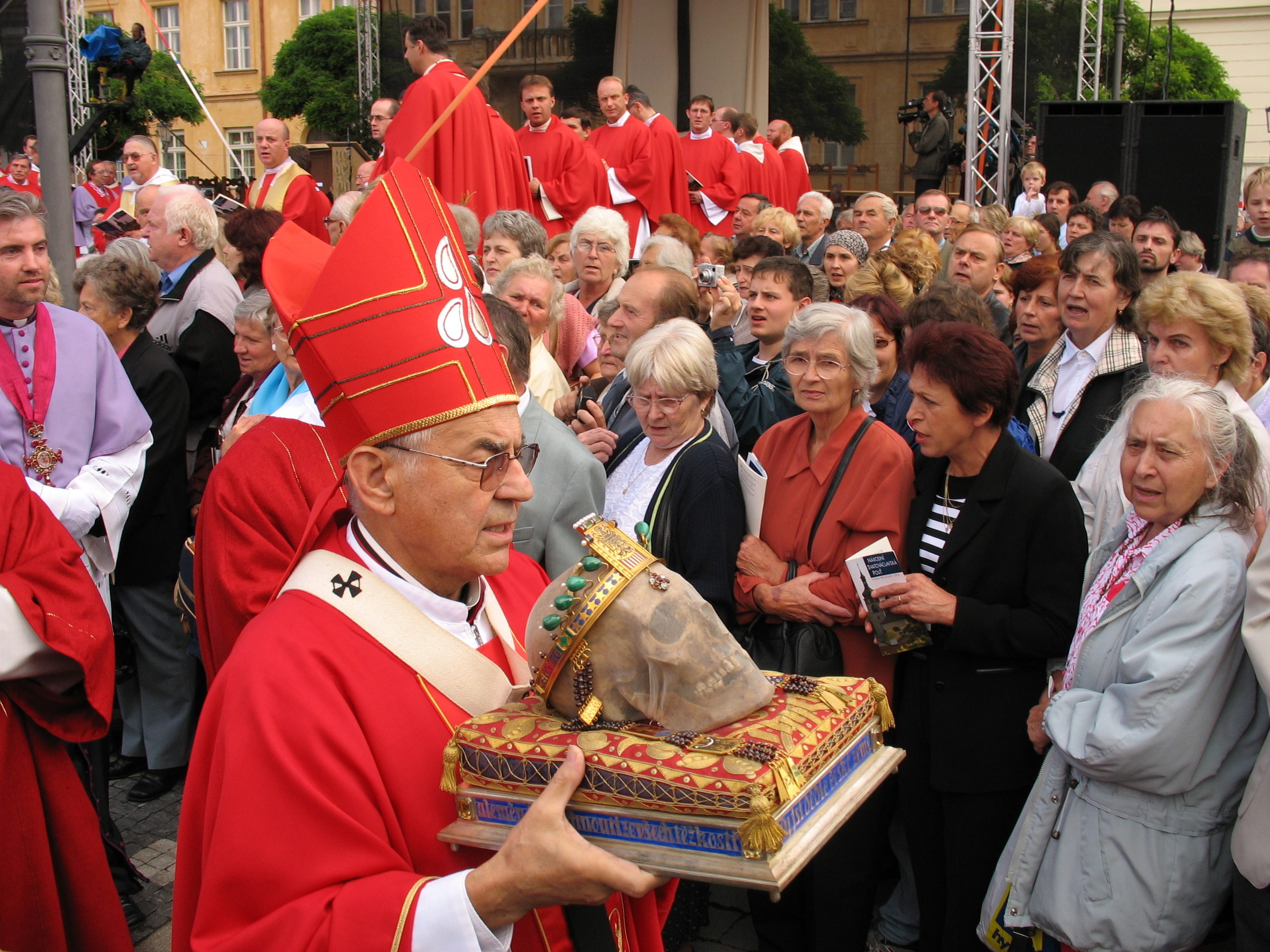
Cardinal Miloslav Vlk with the crowned skull of Saint Wenceslaus during a procession on 28 September 2006

Legends of Wenceslaus began to appear around the second half of the 10th century, several decades after his death, and spread both in Bohemia and abroad, including Italy, Germany, and even Russia. Such legends include the first Old Slavic legend from the 10th century, the Latin legend Crescente fide, Gumpold's legend, and Christian's legend.

According to legend, one Count Radislas rose in rebellion and marched against Wenceslaus. The latter sent a deputation with offers of peace, but Radislas viewed this as cowardice. The two armies were drawn up opposite each other in battle array when Wenceslaus, to avoid shedding innocent blood, challenged Radislas to single combat. As Radislas advanced toward the king, he saw by Wenceslaus's side two angels, who cried: "Stand off!" Thunderstruck, Radislas repented his rebellion, threw himself from his horse at Wenceslaus's feet, and asked for pardon. Wenceslaus raised him and kindly received him again into favour.

A second enduring legend claims an army of knights sleeps under Blaník, a mountain in the Czech Republic. They will awake and, under Wenceslaus's command, bring aid to the Czech people in their ultimate danger. There is a similar legend in Prague which says that when the Motherland is in danger or in its darkest times and close to ruin, the equestrian statue of King Wenceslaus in Wenceslaus Square will come to life, raise the army sleeping in Blaník, and upon crossing the Charles Bridge his horse will stumble and trip over a stone, revealing the legendary sword of Bruncvík. With this sword, Wenceslaus will slay all the enemies of the Czechs, bringing peace and prosperity to the land.

== Legacy ==
Good King Wenceslas
The first, third, and fifth verses, performed by the chorus of the U. S. Army Band

Wenceslaus is the subject of the popular Saint Stephen's Day (celebrated on December 26 in the West) carol "Good King Wenceslas". It was published by John Mason Neale in 1853, and may be a translation of a poem by Czech poet Václav Alois Svoboda. A supposed American spelling of the duke's name, "Wenceslaus", is occasionally encountered in later textual variants of the carol, although it was not used by Neale, and in the U.S. the name usually is spelled Wenceslas, as in the carol. Wenceslaus is not to be confused with King Wenceslaus I of Bohemia (Wenceslaus I Premyslid), who lived more than three centuries later.

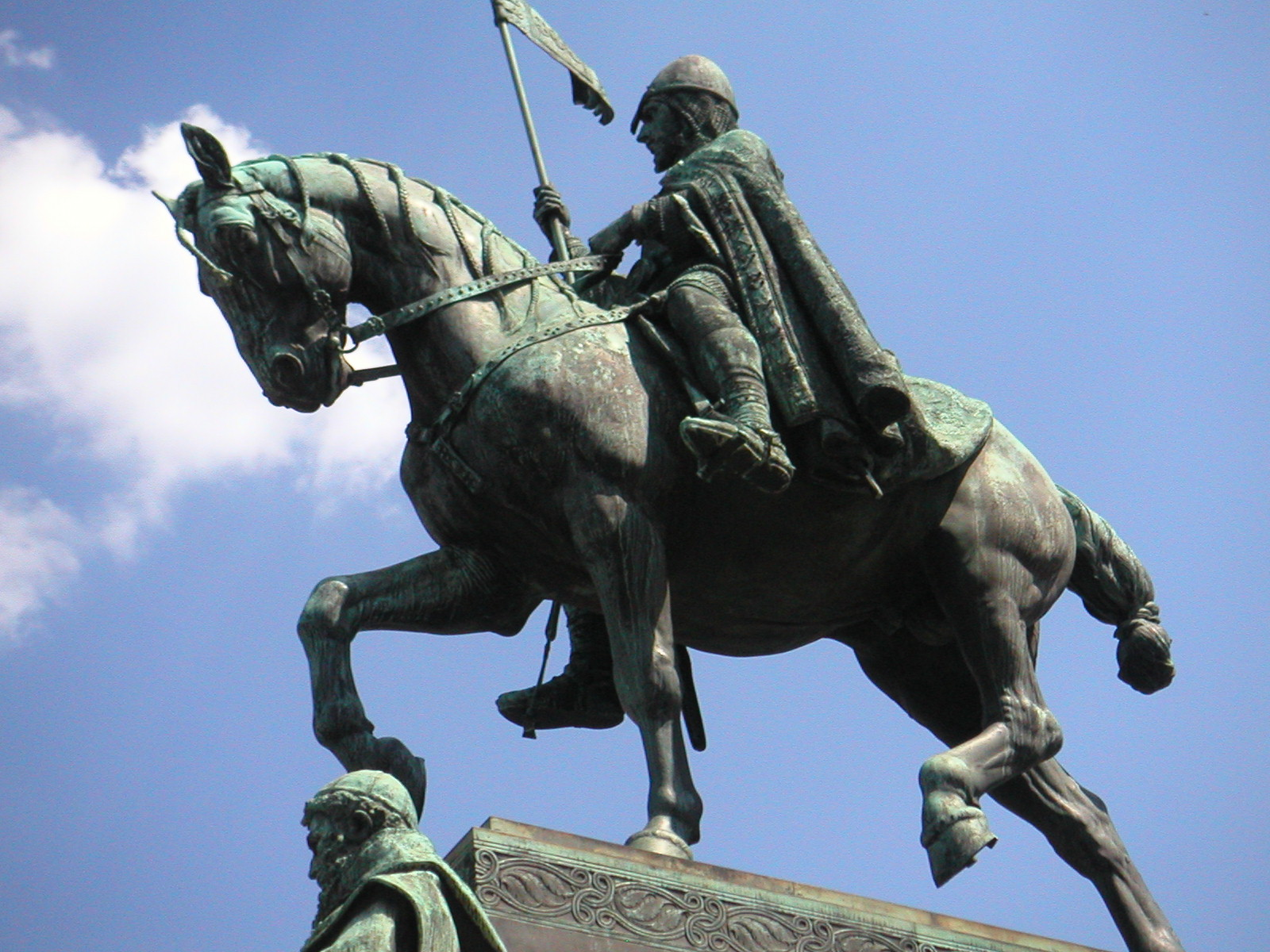
Statue of Saint Wenceslas on the eponymous square in Prague

At the beginning of the Hussite Wars Wenceslaus's name was often invoked, and it was only later that he was overshadowed by Hussite warrior Jan Žižka. Later, even when the Hussites and Protestants gained the upper hand in Bohemia and the cult of Wenceslaus faded, he remained a venerated figure throughout Bohemia, with Jan Hus himself often referencing Wenceslaus in his sermons. During his reign, Charles IV often used Wenceslaus's image as a saint and martyr in his enterprises at home and abroad, and when the systematic Germanization of Bohemia began, Wenceslaus came to be considered a representation of the Czech national consciousness.

An equestrian statue of Saint Wenceslaus and other patrons of Bohemia (St. Adalbert, St. Ludmila, St. Prokop, and St. Agnes of Bohemia) are on Wenceslaus Square in Prague. The statue is a popular meeting place. Demonstrations against the Communist regime were held there.

His helmet and armour are on display inside Prague Castle.

=== In popular culture ===
The 1930 silent film St. Wenceslas was at the time the most expensive Czech film ever made.

Ogden Nash wrote a comic epic poem, "The Christmas that Almost Wasn't" (1957), in which a boy awakens Wenceslaus and his knights to save the kingdom of Lullapat from usurpers who have outlawed Christmas, with elements from the legend of Wenceslas.

A 2023 novel by George WB Scott entitled "The Good King" tells the history behind the famous Christmas carol from the point of view of the younger brother of the saint, Boleslav I, "The Cruel," who is accountable for the saint's murder. The story is meant to be accurate to the limited historical records, and includes historical and fictionalized characters and situations based on research of the time period. The book includes a bibliography of reference sources.

== See also ==
- Crown of Saint Wenceslas
- Sword of Saint Wenceslas
- Statues of Saints Norbert, Wenceslaus and Sigismund
- Good King Wenceslas

== Notes ==
Preceded by Vratislav I	Duke of Bohemia; 921–935	Succeeded by Boleslav I
