= Ludmila of Bohemia =

Czech saint (c. 860 – 921)

Saint Ludmila
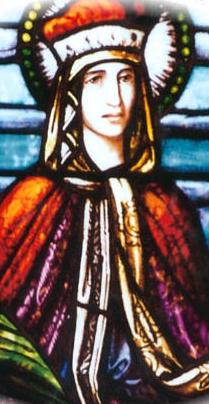
- Saint Ludmila, St. Ludmila's Church, Cedar Rapids, Iowa

Martyr
- Born: c. 860; Mělník
- Died: 15 September 921; Tetín castle (cs), Tetín, Bohemia
- Venerated in: Catholic Church; Eastern Orthodox Church
- Canonized: shortly after her death
- Major shrine: Chapel of St. Ludmila
- Feast: 16 September
- Attributes: veil
- Patronage: Bohemia

Ludmila of Bohemia (c. 860 – 15 September 921) is a Czech saint and martyr venerated by Catholic and Orthodox Christians. She was born in Mělník as the daughter of the Sorbian prince Slavibor. Saint Ludmila was the grandmother of Saint Wenceslaus, who is widely referred to as Good King Wenceslaus. Saint Ludmila was canonised shortly after her death. As part of the process of canonisation, in 925, Wenceslaus moved her remains to St. George's Basilica, Prague.

== Marriage ==
Ludmila was married to Bořivoj I of Bohemia, the first Christian Duke of Bohemia, in 873. The couple converted to Christianity through the efforts of Methodius. Their efforts to convert Bohemia to Christianity were initially not well received, and pagans drove them from their country for a time. Eventually the couple returned and ruled for several years before retiring to Tetín, near Beroun.

In 875, the eldest son of the princely couple, Spytihněv, was born. Ludmila gave birth to at least six children (three sons and three daughters - not counting any children who died in infancy and were not mentioned in the records) during the approximately fourteen years of her marriage. Only the names of two sons Spytihněv 875-915 and Vratislav c. 888-921) are known, both of whom later ascended to the princely throne.

Bořivoj was succeeded by their son Spytihněv. Spytihněv was succeeded by his brother Vratislav. When Vratislav died in 921, his son Wenceslas became the next ruler of Bohemia. It had been primarily Ludmila who raised her grandson, and she acted as regent for him.

== Ludmila and Drahomíra ==
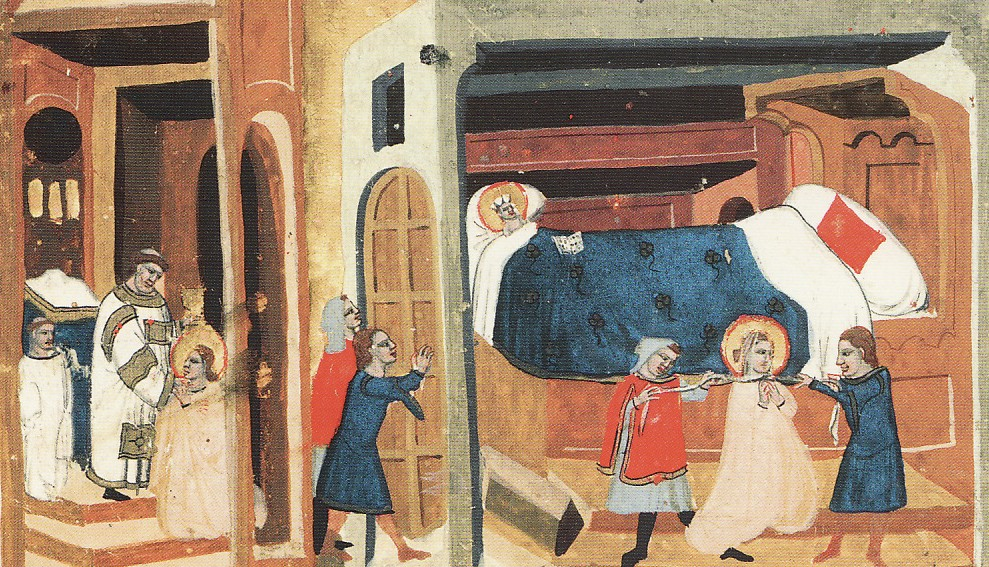
Murder of Saint Ludmila

Wenceslaus' mother, Drahomíra, became jealous of Ludmila's influence over Wenceslaus. She had two noblemen, Tunna and Gommon (probably of Frankish or Varangian descent) murder Ludmila in Tetín, and part of Ludmila's narrative states that she was strangled with her veil. Initially, Ludmila was buried at St. Michael's at Tetín.

Ludmila was canonized shortly after her death. As part of the process of canonization, in 925 Wenceslaus moved her remains to St. George's Basilica, Prague. She is venerated as a patroness of Bohemia. She is considered to be a patron saint of Bohemia, converts, duchesses, those with problems with in-laws, and widows. Her feast day is celebrated on September 16.

Antonín Dvořák composed his oratorio Saint Ludmila between September 1885 and May 1886. The work was commissioned by the publisher Littleton for the Leeds Festival.

== Interesting facts ==
A direct descendant of Saint Ludmila is Cardinal Christoph Schönborn, Archbishop Emeritus of Vienna.

== See also ==
- St. George's Basilica, Prague
- House of Přemysl
- Bohemia
- Statue of Saint Ludmila, Charles Bridge
- Saint Ludmila, patron saint archive

== Sources ==
- Pekar, J., Die Wenzels- und Ludmilla-Legenden und die Echtheit Christians (Prag, 1906).
- Christianus Monachus, "Vita et Passio sancti Venceslai et sanctae Ludmilae avae eius," in Magnae Moraviae Fontes Historici (Brno, 1967), 186–199.
- Ingham, N. W., "The Lost Church Slavonic Life of Saint Ludmila," in Studia Slavica Mediaevalia et Himanistica. Riccardo Piccio dicata. T. 1–2 (Roma, 1986), 349–360.

Royal titles
Preceded by -	Duchess consort of Bohemia c. 874–888/891	Succeeded by Drahomíra
