= Tetín (Beroun District) =

- Municipality
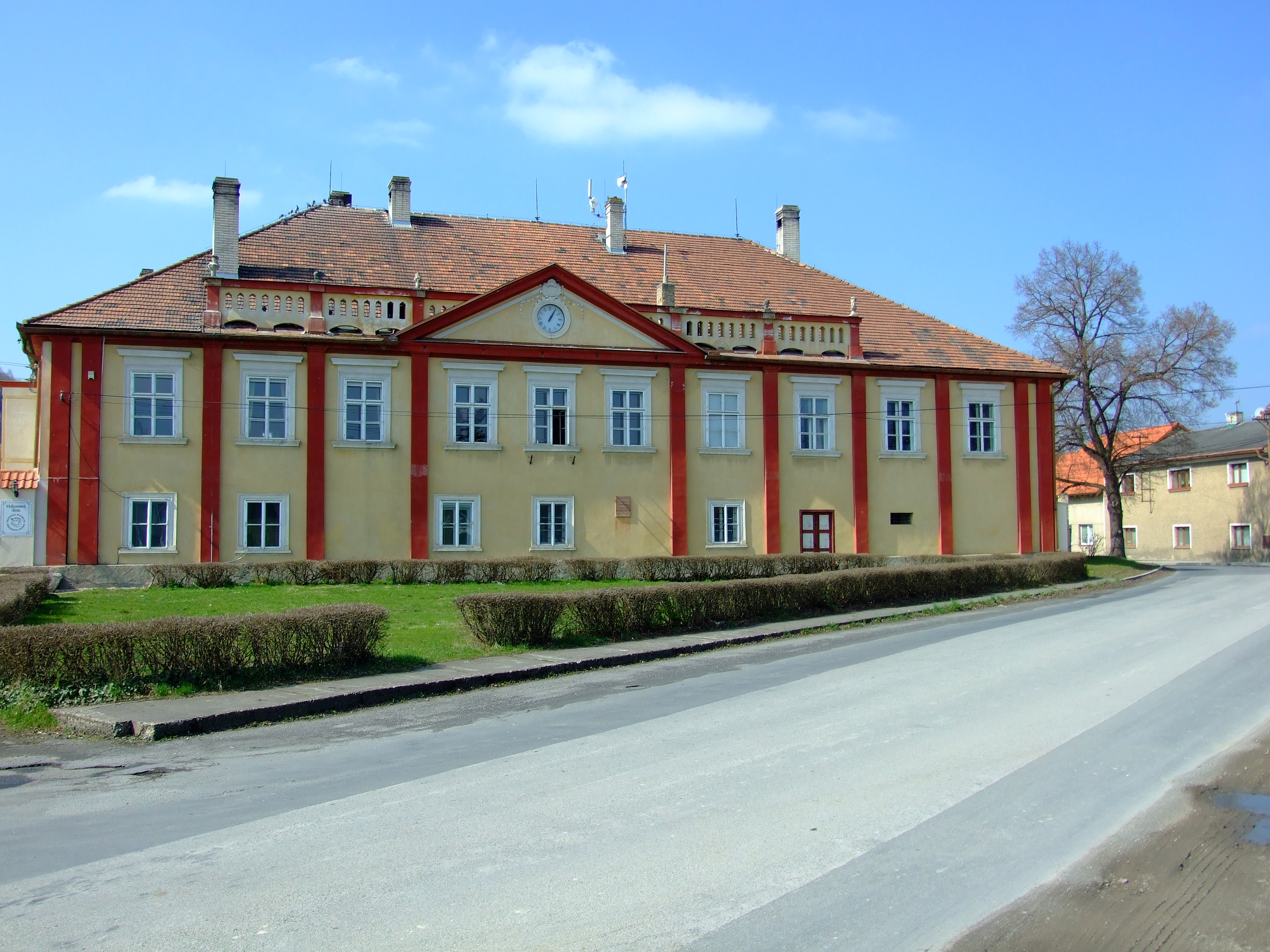
- Tetín Castle

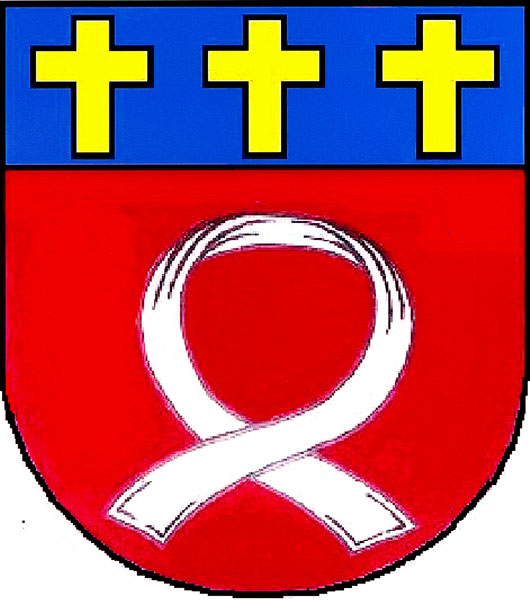
- Flag Coat of arms

- Location in the Czech Republic
- Coordinates: 49°56′58″N 14°6′8″E
- Country: Czech Republic
- Region: Central Bohemian
- District: Beroun
- First mentioned: 1088

Area
  - Total: 10.29 km^{2} (3.97 sq mi)
- Elevation: 235 m (771 ft)

Population (2026-01-01)
  - Total: 851
  - Density: 82.7/km^{2} (214/sq mi)
- Time zone: UTC+1 (CET)
  - Summer (DST): UTC+2 (CEST)
- Postal code: 266 01
- Website: www.tetin.cz

Tetín is a municipality and village in Beroun District in the Central Bohemian Region of the Czech Republic. It has about 900 inhabitants.

== Administrative division ==
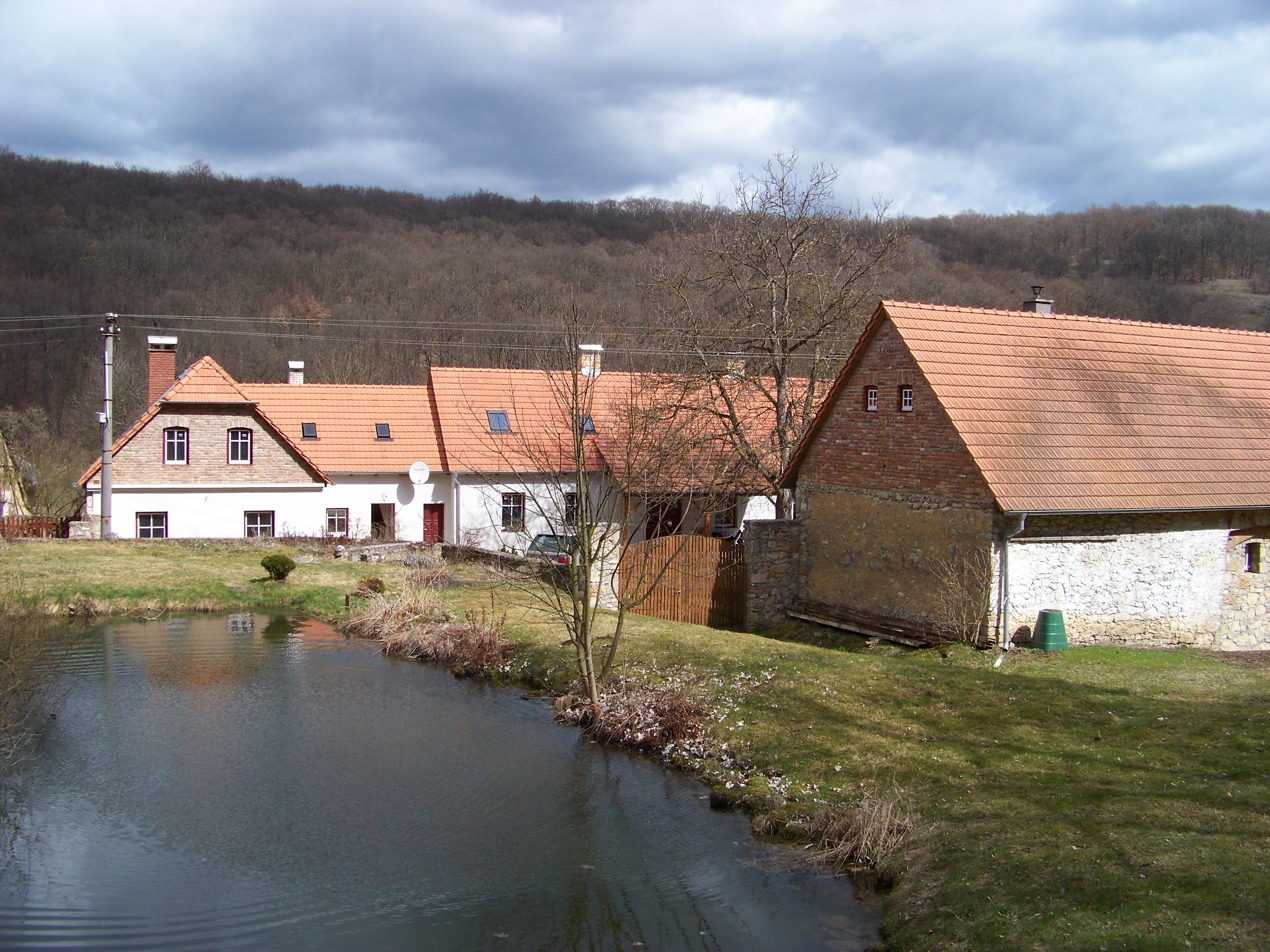
Koda hamlet

Tetín consists of two municipal parts (in brackets population according to the 2021 census):

- Tetín (820)
- Koda (3)

== Etymology ==
The name is derived from the personal name Teta, meaning "Teta's (castle/court)".

== Geography ==
Tetín is located about 2 kilometres (1 mi) south of Beroun and 23 km (14 mi) southwest of Prague. It lies in the Hořovice Uplands. The highest point is the hill Tobolský vrch at 467 m (1,532 ft) above sea level. The municipality is situated on the right bank of the Berounka River, which forms the municipal border.

Most of the territory lies in the Bohemian Karst Protected Landscape Area. The Koda National Nature Reserve with the Bohemian Karst occupies almost half of the municipal territory. Along the Berounka there is also the Tetínské skály Nature Reserve.

== History ==
Tetín is one of the oldest villages in the Czech Republic. There is a legend that connects Tetín with the mythological figure Teta (the daughter of the mythological Duke Krok), who was supposed to have lived here.

The place was already inhabited during the Paleolithic period. Archaeologists found that the beginnings of the village date back to the 10th century, when local gord was founded by dukes from the Přemyslid dynasty. In the 10th century, the duchess Ludmila of Bohemia raised St. Wenceslaus in the gord. She was murdered here in 921.

In 1288, Tetín was the residence of the royal hunter and towards the end of the 13th century, the castle was rebuilt as a residence for the royal bastards of the Přemyslid line. By 1321, Tetín Castle was owned by Štěpán of Tetín, who later sold it to Emperor Charles IV. The latter then joined the Tetín estate to Karlštejn. In 1422, during the Hussite Wars, the castle was destroyed. In the late Middle Ages, the importance of Tetín declined, but it remained a frequented pilgrimage site.

In the second half of the 19th century, limestone mining began near Tetín. This caused economic development and an influx of new residents.

== Demographics ==
Historical population

Year	Pop.	±%
1869	579	—
1880	664	+14.7%
1890	756	+13.9%
1900	935	+23.7%
1910	1,099	+17.5%

Year	Pop.	±%
1921	1,076	−2.1%
1930	1,193	+10.9%
1950	944	−20.9%
1961	938	−0.6%
1970	862	−8.1%

Year	Pop.	±%
1980	803	−6.8%
1991	720	−10.3%
2001	704	−2.2%
2011	821	+16.6%
2021	823	+0.2%

Source: Censuses

== Transport ==
The railway line Prague–Beroun runs through the municipality, but there is no train station.

== Sights ==
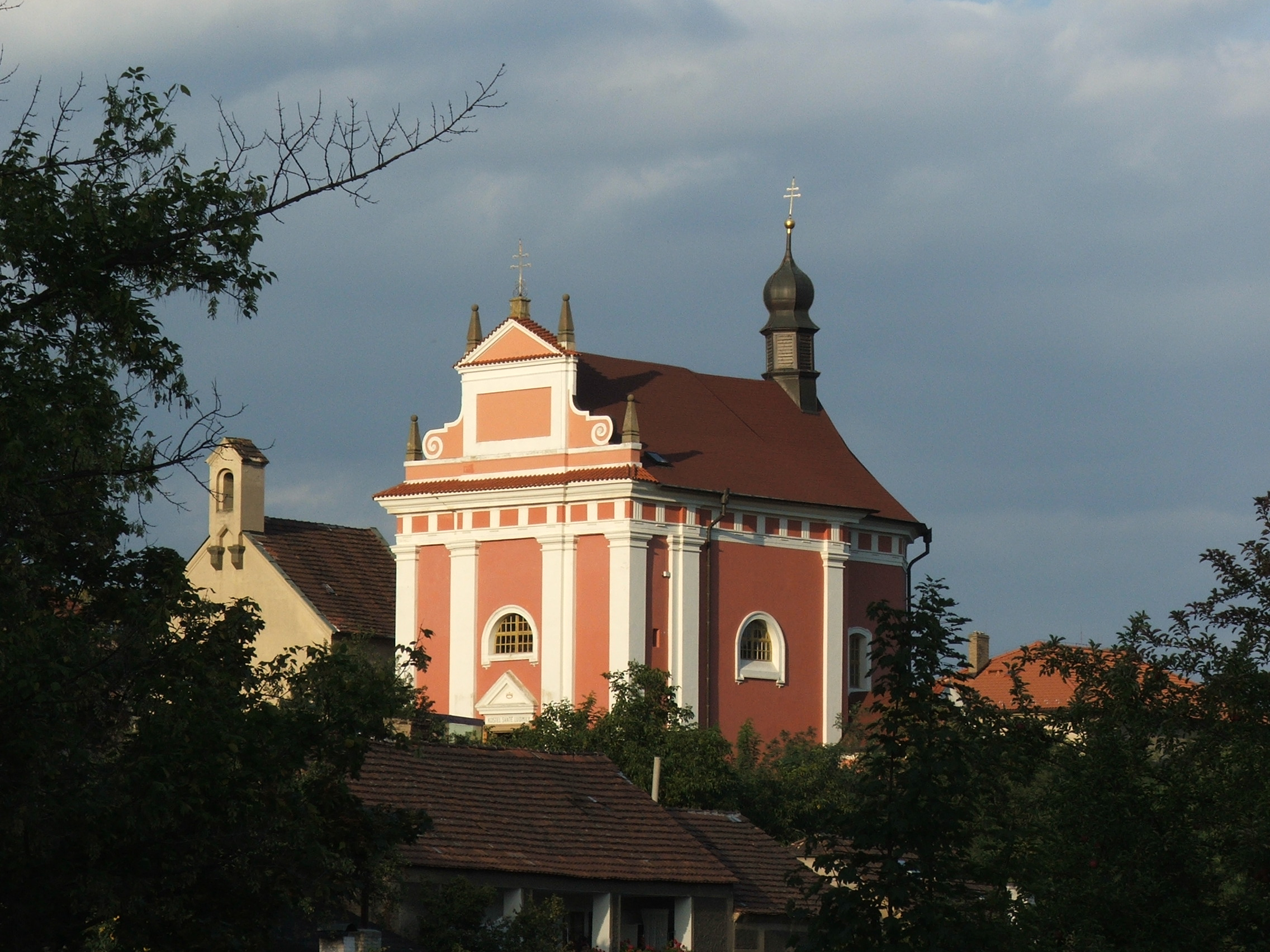
Church of Saint Ludmila

The Church of Saint Catherine of Alexandria is the smallest church in Tetín. This Romanesque church was founded around 1200 and restored in 1858. The Church of Saint Ludmila was built in the early Baroque style in 1685 next to the Church of Saint Catherine of Alexandria.

The Church of Saint John of Nepomuk was originally a Romanesque church from the 12th–13th centuries. In the 17th century, it was rebuilt in the Baroque style. Until 1836, it was consecrated to Saint Michael. Today the church is desecrated and houses an art gallery.

Several ruins have been preserved from the original Tetín Castle. They are freely accessible.

The Tetín Castle is a Neoclassical castle from the end of the 18th century. Today it is privately owned and inaccessible to the public.

== Notable people ==
- Ludmila of Bohemia (c. 860–921), duchess, martyr and saint; died here
- Wenceslaus Hajek (?–1553), chronicler; lived and worked here in 1533–1539
