= Vratislaus I of Bohemia =

Duke of Bohemia from 915 to 921

Vratislaus I
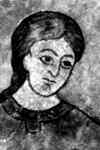
- Detail from a 12th-century fresco in the Rotunda of Saint Catherine, probably depicting Vratislaus I

Duke of Bohemia
- Reign: 915 – 13 February 921
- Predecessor: Spytihněv I
- Successor: Wenceslaus I
- Born: c. 888
- Died: 13 February 921 (aged c. 33)
- Burial: St. George's Basilica, Prague
- Spouse: Drahomíra
- Issue: Wenceslaus I, Duke of Bohemia; Boleslaus I, Duke of Bohemia; Střezislava (?)
- Dynasty: Přemyslid
- Father: Bořivoj I, Duke of Bohemia
- Mother: Ludmila of Bohemia

Vratislaus (or Wratislaus) I (Czech: Vratislav I.; c. 888 – 13 February 921), a member of the Přemyslid dynasty, was Duke of Bohemia from 915 until his death in 921.

== Life ==
He was a son of Duke Bořivoj I of Bohemia by his wife Ludmila and the younger brother of Duke Spytihněv I. Around 906, he married Drahomíra, a Hevellian princess, to establish close ties with the Polabian Slavs. Vratislaus had at least two sons, Wenceslaus and Boleslaus, both of whom succeeded him as Bohemian dukes. Some historians believe that Střezislava, the wife of the Bohemian nobleman Slavník, founder of the Slavník dynasty, was also the daughter of Vratislaus.

Upon the death of his elder brother Spytihněv in 915, Vratislaus became duke at a time when the Bohemian lands around Prague Castle had already distanced themselves from the political and cultural sphere of Great Moravia and fallen under the influence of East Francia, especially during the rule of Duke Arnulf of Bavaria. The contemporary Annales Fuldenses report that the Bavarian forces had attacked Prince Mojmír II of Moravia in alliance with the Bohemians already in the year 900. On the other hand, Duke Vratislaus offered the Hungarian invaders free passage and supported their campaign against the Saxon duke Henry the Fowler in the year 915.

Vratislaus is credited with the establishment of St. George's Basilica at Prague Castle and also with the foundation of the Silesian city of Wrocław (Breslau), whose Latin name "Vratislavia" denotes his initiative. He died in battle against the Hungarians, possibly in 919, although 921 is more often conjectured.

Vratislaus I of Bohemia Přemyslid dynasty Born: c. 888 Died: 13 February 921
Preceded by Spytihněv I	Duke of Bohemia; 915–921	Succeeded by Wenceslaus I
