= Bořivoj I of Bohemia =

Duke of Bohemia from c. 867 to c. 889

Bořivoj I
- Baptism of Duke Bořivoj, 19th-century painting

Duke of Bohemia
- Reign: c. 867 – c. 889
- Predecessor: Unknown
- Successor: Spytihněv I
- Born: c. 852
- Died: c. 889 (aged c. 35–36)
- Spouse: Ludmila
- Issue: Spytihněv; Vratislaus
- Dynasty: Přemyslid
- Father: Hostivít

Bořivoj I (Czech pronunciation: [ˈbor̝ɪvoj], Latin: Borzivogius, c. 852 – c. 889) was the first historically documented Duke of Bohemia and progenitor of the Přemyslid dynasty. His reign over the Duchy of Bohemia is believed to have started about the year 870, but in this era Bohemia was subordinated to Great Moravia. One of the most important clues to the approximate time of his accession is the contemporary Frankish chronicle Annales Fuldenses, which mentions several West Slavic princes in the year 872, among them one Goriwei, who may be identical with Bořivoj.

== Life ==
According to the early 12th-century Cosmas' Chronica Boëmorum, Bořivoj was a son of the legendary Bohemian prince Hostivít, thus a descendant of Queen Libuše and her husband Přemysl the Ploughman. His ancestry has not been conclusively established by historians, however. In view of his dependence on Great Moravia, he might have been related by blood to the Mojmir dynasty. DNA testing on the remains of his son, Spytihněv, suggests the family's Y-haplogroup was R1b, common to Western Europe and Czech Republic.

Bořivoj initially resided at Levý Hradec, a gord situated northwest of present-day Prague. As the head of the Přemyslids who dominated the Central Bohemian environs, Bořivoj declared himself kníže ("prince")—in Latin dux, which means a sovereign prince—around the year 867 AD. His title was later translated by German scholars as "duke" (Herzog) of the Bohemian (Czechs). Although the rulers of the German stem duchies emerging in the late 9th century held the same title, the meaning of his title was in fact completely different. In contrast to the German dukes who acted as the representatives of higher rulers (kings or emperors), the Czech dux denoted a sovereign ruler. Bořivoj was recognised as such around 872 by his overlord King Svatopluk I of Moravia, who dispatched Bishop Methodius of Thessalonica to begin the Christianization of Bohemia.

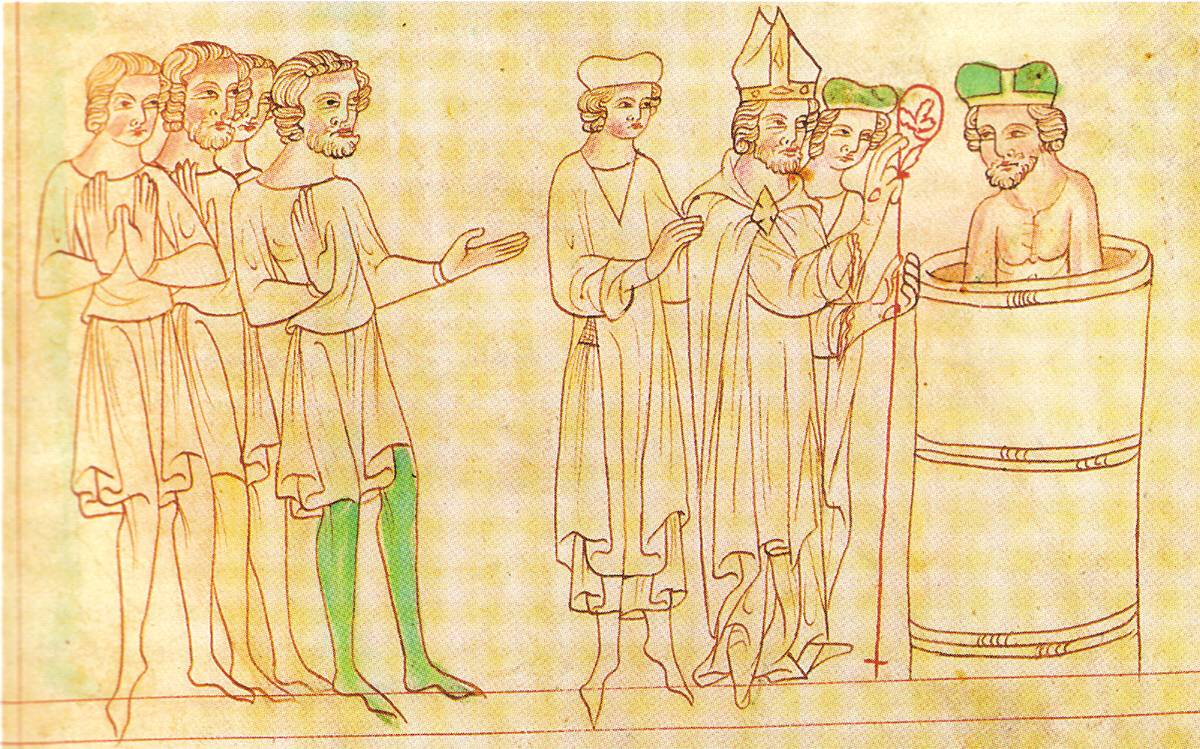
Baptism of Bořivoj, Velislai biblia picta, 14th century

In 872, Bořivoj supported Svatopluk militarily in his dispute with the East Frankish king Louis the German, and in south Bohemia, they defeated the Frankish troops. About 874, Bořivoj married Ludmila (later canonized as St. Ludmila of Bohemia). The couple had two known sons, Spytihněv and Vratislaus, both of whom succeeded him as dukes. Ludmila and Bořivoj were baptised by Methodius (probably in 883), and the latter became an enthusiastic evangelist, although the religion failed to take root among Bořivoj's subjects.

In the years 883/884, Bořivoj was deposed by a revolt in support of his Přemyslid kinsman Strojmír. He was restored in 885 only with the support of his suzerain Svatopluk of Moravia. The duke or (more probably) his son Spytihněv moved his residence to the Hradčany mountain and laid the foundations for Prague Castle. When Bořivoj died about 889, his sons still minors, King Svatopluk concluded an agreement with the East Frankish ruler Arnulf of Carinthia and took over the rule of the Bohemian duchy himself.

As with most of the early Bohemian rulers, Bořivoj is a shadowy figure; exact dates for his reign and vital statistics cannot be established. Nonetheless, several major fortifications and religious foundations are said to have dated from this time.

== Notes ==
Bořivoj I of Bohemia Přemyslid dynasty Born: c. 852 Died: c. 889
Preceded by Unknown	Duke of Bohemia c. 867 – c. 889	Succeeded by Spytihněv I
