= Soběslav I of Bohemia =

Duke of Bohemia from 1125 to 1140

Soběslav I
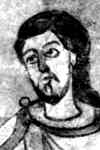

Duke of Bohemia
- Reign: 12 April 1125 – 14 February 1140
- Predecessor: Vladislaus I
- Successor: Vladislaus II
- Born: c. 1075
- Died: 14 February 1140 (aged 64–65)
- Spouse: Adelaide of Hungary
- Issue: Wenceslaus II; Udalrich of Olomouc; Maria of Bohemia; Soběslav II; Vladislaus
- House: Přemyslid dynasty
- Father: Vratislaus II
- Mother: Świętosława of Poland

Soběslav I (also Sobeslaus; c. 1075 – 14 February 1140) was Duke of Bohemia from 1125 until his death in 1140. He was a member of the Přemyslid dynasty, the youngest son of Vratislaus II (d. 1092), by his third wife Świętosława of Poland.

== Life ==
Soběslav is first documented about 1107, when he and his elder brother Duke Bořivoj II were expelled by their Přemyslid relative Svatopluk of Olomouc and fled to the court of their maternal cousin Duke Bolesław III Wrymouth of Poland. After Svatopluk was assassinated during the Battle of Głogów in 1109, Bořivoj's attempts to regain the Bohemian throne failed. In the following fratricidal war that followed the battle, Bořivoj's younger brother Vladislaus I prevailed, backed by King Henry V of Germany. Later the brothers reconciled and Soběslav was vested with rule at Brno and Znojmo in Moravia from 1115 until 1123, when tensions between the brothers rose again and Soběslav was once more expelled.

Nevertheless, as the last surviving son of Vratislaus II, he succeeded to the ducal throne after Duke Vladislaus' death in 1125. From the beginning, his rule was contested by Otto II the Black, the younger brother of Svatopluk, who gained support not only from Vladislaus's widow Richeza of Berg, but also from King Lothair III of Germany. Soběslav therefore was an adversary of the German monarchy throughout his reign and began by using the divisiveness of the 1125 election of King Lothair against rival Duke Frederick II of Swabia to further Bohemian independence.

When Soběslav decided to dethrone Otto II from Olomouc, the despoiled prince recoursed to the German king. Lothair III declared that no one could succeed to the Bohemian throne without Imperial investiture and proceeded to invade on behalf of Otto II. This, however, was dangerous to the interests of the local nobility, and they rallied around Soběslav. On 18 February 1126, the German and Moravian troops under Lothair met the Bohemian forces at the Battle of Chlumec, a frontier fortress at the border with the March of Meissen. Soběslav routed and captured King Lothair, while Otto II was killed in battle. However, the relationship between the two countries returned to the former vassal-suzerain relationship, as King Lothair was released on condition of Soběslav's investiture with Bohemia.

Throughout his reign, Soběslav continued to possess the Olomouc duchy, but his rule in Bohemia was again undermined by his nephew Bretislaus, son of Soběslav's eldest brother Duke Bretislaus II (d. 1100). Young Bretislaus referred to the principle of agnatic seniority and had the support of the Moravian dukes Conrad II of Znojmo and Vratislaus II of Brno, as well as of the church party under Bishop Meinhard of Prague. In June 1130, the conspiracy was discovered and thwarted with much bloodshed. The dukes survived and continued to rule, but Bretislaus was blinded. Upon the accession of his brother-in-law King Bela II of Hungary in 1131, he became entangled in an armed conflict with Duke Bolesław III of Poland, who supported Bela's rival Boris Kalamanos.

Conrad III of Hohenstaufen, elected King of the Romans in 1138, tried to amend relations between the thrones of Bohemia and Germany. At the Reichstag of Bamberg in the same year, he gave Soběslav the hereditary dignity of the archcupbearer of the Holy Roman Empire and the promise to vest his eldest son Vladislaus with Bohemia upon his death. The duke's reign saw the foundation of many new German colonies in Czech lands in the course of the Ostsiedlung (German eastward expansion}.

Soběslav died on 14 February 1140 at Hostinné Castle. The succession intended for his son failed, as the Bohemian estates raised his nephew Vladislaus II, the son of his elder brother and predecessor Duke Vladislaus, to the ducal dignity with the approval of Conrad III.

== Marriage and issue ==
About 1123 Soběslav married Adelaide, daughter of Prince Álmos of Hungary. The marriage produced at least five children:

1. Vladislaus (d. 1165), Duke at Olomouc, married an unnamed daughter of Albert the Bear
2. Maria (1124/25-1172)
3. Soběslav II (~1128-1180), Duke of Bohemia
4. Udalrich II (1134–1177), Duke at Olomouc
5. Wenceslaus II (1137–1192), Duke of Bohemia

== Sources ==
- Raffensperger, Christian (2018). Conflict, Bargaining, and Kinship Networks in Medieval Eastern Europe. Lexington Books.
- Petr Sommer; Třeštík, Dušan; Žemlička, Josef, et al.: Přemyslovci. Budování českého státu. Nakladatelství Lidové noviny, Praha 2009, ISBN 978-80-7106-352-0, besonders S. 198–200.

Regnal titles
| Preceded by Vladislaus I | Duke of Bohemia; 1125–1140 | Succeeded by Vladislaus II |
