= Henry I of Berg =

Henry I, Count of Berg (c. 1073 – 24 September 1115) was a Bavarian nobleman who ruled Berg Castle in Ehingen, Bavaria. His parents were Poppo, Count of Berg, and his wife Sophia, who is sometimes claimed to be a Princess of Hungary – an otherwise unattested daughter of Solomon, King of Hungary and Judith of Swabia, but this is highly unlikely for chronological reasons. The historian Christoph Friedrich von Stälin theorised that their great political power despite humble origins was due to kinship with Bishop St. Otto of Bamberg, who was also Judith's chaplain after her marriage to Władysław I, Duke of Poland, with whom she had a daughter Adelaide, who married Henry's brother-in-law Diepold III, Margrave of Vohburg and gave birth to Adelaide of Vohburg, the first wife of Frederick Barbarossa.

Henry married around 1090 to Adelaide of Mochental, daughter of Diepold II, Margrave of Vohburg and Liutgard of Carinthia. During the 1090s Henry and Adelaide had three sons and three daughters, who married highly influential nobles from the Houses Přemyslid of Bohemia and Piast of Poland. Henry retired during the 1100s and became a monk in Zwiefalten Abbey. His eldest son succeeded him as the Count of Berg.

Henry and Adelaide had:

1. Henry II, Count of Berg (c. 1093 – 1126), who succeeded him
2. Richeza of Berg (c. 1095 – 1125), who married Vladislaus I, Duke of Bohemia
3. Diepold II, Count of Berg (c. 1097 – 1160), who succeeded Henry II
4. Sophia of Berg (c. 1099 – 1126), who married Otto II, Prince of Olomouc
5. Salomea of Berg (c. 1101 – 1144), who married Bolesław III, Duke of Poland
6. Rapoto, Count of Berg (c. 1103 – 1164), who succeeded Diepold II.

Diepold II married Gisela of Andechs, daughter of Berthold II, Count of Andechs and Sophia of Istria and they had sons including Bishops Henry, Diepold and Manegold of Passau as well as Berthold, Count of Berg, who was Rapoto's successor and father of Henry I, the first Margrave of Burgau.

== Sources ==
- Wiszewski, Przemyslaw (2010). Domus Bolezlai: Values and social identity in dynastic traditions of medieval Poland (c.966-1138). Brill.
