= Loděnice =

Loděnice may refer to places in the Czech Republic:

- Loděnice (river), a tributary of the Berounka
- Loděnice (Beroun District), a municipality and village in the Central Bohemian Region
  - Battle of Loděnice
- Loděnice (Brno-Country District), a municipality and village in the South Moravian Region
- Loděnice, a village and part of Holasovice in the Moravian-Silesian Region
- Loděnice, a village and part of Jedousov in the Pardubice Region
- Horní Loděnice, a municipality and village in the Olomouc Region
