= 1190 =

1190 in various calendars
- Gregorian calendar: 1190; MCXC
- Ab urbe condita: 1943
- Armenian calendar: 639; ԹՎ ՈԼԹ
- Assyrian calendar: 5940
- Balinese saka calendar: 1111–1112
- Bengali calendar: 596–597
- Berber calendar: 2140
- English Regnal year: 1 Ric. 1 – 2 Ric. 1
- Buddhist calendar: 1734
- Burmese calendar: 552
- Byzantine calendar: 6698–6699
- Chinese calendar: 己酉年 (Earth Rooster); 3887 or 3680 — to — 庚戌年 (Metal Dog); 3888 or 3681
- Coptic calendar: 906–907
- Discordian calendar: 2356
- Ethiopian calendar: 1182–1183
- Hebrew calendar: 4950–4951
- Hindu calendars
- Vikram Samvat: 1246–1247
- Shaka Samvat: 1111–1112
- Kali Yuga: 4290–4291
- Holocene calendar: 11190
- Igbo calendar: 190–191
- Iranian calendar: 568–569
- Islamic calendar: 585–586
- Japanese calendar: Bunji 6 / Kenkyū 1 (建久元年)
- Javanese calendar: 1097–1098
- Julian calendar: 1190; MCXC
- Korean calendar: 3523
- Minguo calendar: 722 before ROC 民前722年
- Nanakshahi calendar: −278
- Seleucid era: 1501/1502 AG
- Thai solar calendar: 1732–1733
- Tibetan calendar: ས་མོ་བྱ་ལོ་ (female Earth-Bird); 1316 or 935 or 163 — to — ལྕགས་ཕོ་ཁྱི་ལོ་ (male Iron-Dog); 1317 or 936 or 164

The Near East with the Crusader states

Year 1190 (MCXC) was a common year starting on Monday of the Julian calendar.

== Events ==
=== By place ===
==== Byzantine Empire ====
- Spring – A German expeditionary force (some 15,000 men) led by Emperor Frederick I (Barbarossa) marches towards Constantinople, on the way to the Holy Land. Emperor Isaac II (Angelos), suspicious that Frederick is planning to conquer Constantinople, attempts to stop him by attacking the Crusaders. The German forces are too strong and they capture Adrianople. A peace treaty is signed by both Isaac and Frederick, that ensures the Germans are given supplies, and free passage through to Palestina.
- Isaac II starts a campaign against the Bulgarians, who claim their independence. After passing the Balkan Mountains, Isaac marches westward to besiege Tarnovo, the new Bulgarian capital. Meanwhile, the Byzantine fleet reaches the Danube River in order to block the way of Cuman reinforcements from the North. The defense of Tarnovo is led by Ivan Asen I, emperor (Tsar) of Bulgaria. After spreading rumors of the arrival of a Cuman army to relieve the city, Isaac orders to retreat to Stara Zagora.
- Battle of Tryavna: Byzantine forces under Isaac II are ambushed and defeated by the Bulgarians in a mountain pass, near Tryavna. In panic, the Byzantines break up and begin a disorganized retreat. Isaac barely escapes, his Varangian Guard has to cut a path through their own soldiers, enabling their emperor's flight from the rout. The Bulgarians capture the imperial treasure, including the golden helmet of Isaac, his crown, and the Imperial Cross which contains a wooden piece of the Holy Cross.

==== Third Crusade ====
- March – Frederick I leaves Adrianople to Gallipoli at the Dardanelles to embark, with the help of Byzantine transports, to cross into Asia Minor. On April 25, he enters territory of the Seljuk Sultanate of Rum under the rule of Sultan Kilij Arslan II. Although promised to let the German Crusaders pass peaceably through his domains, Kilij Arslan harasses Frederick's forces with hit-and-run attacks. On May 7, a Turkish army (some 10,000 men) is defeated at the Battle of Philomelion, by 2,000 Crusaders.
- March 25 – Conrad of Montferrat sails south with a Crusader fleet (some 50 ships) from Tyre. As Conrad's fleet approaches the harbour of Acre, an equally sized Muslim fleet sorties out to meet the Crusaders in open battle. Eventually, the Ayyubid fleet is blockaded (supported by Danish and Pisan ships) in the port. Acre is again cut off from reinforcements; the city's supplies are exhausted, and the Muslim garrison has to resort to eating their own beasts. In the event, troops are driven to cannibalism.
- April – After a long siege Muslim forces under Saladin capture Beaufort Castle from Reginald of Sidon who has offered to hand over the castle to Saladin on the condition that he has three months to remove his family to a place of safety. At the end of the three months, Saladin expects the castle to be handed over but finds that Reginald has used the time to strengthen the castle against a siege. He is imprisoned at Damascus – the castle's garrison finally surrenders in return for Reginald's release.
- May 5 – Siege of Acre: A Crusader force under King Guy of Lusignan attacks the city with three siege engines, but all are destroyed by the Muslim defenders with Greek fire, a highly flammable liquid. An Egyptian flotilla is able to avoid the Pisan fleet (some 50 ships) and resupply the city with new provisions. Saladin launches a massive eight-day attack on the Crusaders two weeks later. Meanwhile, in the Crusader camp the conditions are deteriorating by disease and famine, among the soldiers.
- May 18 – Battle of Iconium: German forces under Frederick I defeat the Seljuk army (40,000 men) in a pitched battle. They are routed, leaving the city at the mercy of the German Crusaders. Frederick does not pursue the Seljuks, because his forces have been weakened by food shortage for the previous weeks. His 23-year-old son, Frederick VI, takes Iconium (modern-day Konya) and proceeds to massacre the citizens. The Germans take booty amounting to 100,000 marks in the Turkish capital.
- June 10 – Frederick I drowns while crossing (or bathing in) the Göksu River near Selucia (modern-day Silifke) in Armenian Cilicia. The German Crusaders are demoralized and exhausted by the summer heat, Frederick VI takes over the command of his father, carrying with him the emperor's body preserved in a barrel of vinegar. Some of the German nobles decide to return home with their followers; Frederick continues with his army (some 5,000 men) and eventually reaches Antioch, on June 21.
- September 24 – A Crusader fleet attempts to destroy the Tower of Flies at Acre, which guards the city's harbour, by ramming vessels loaded with combustibles into it. At a critical moment, the ships collide with one another and are badly damaged. A specially built Pisan vessel resembling a floating castle and outfitted with mangonels, is set afire during a sortie from the harbour by a Muslim flotilla.
- November 24 – The 18-year-old Isabella I, half-sister of Sibylla, Queen of Jerusalem, marries Conrad of Montferrat at Acre making him de facto king of Jerusalem (as Conrad I). He has the support of her mother Maria Comnena and stepfather Balian of Ibelin, as well as Reginald of Sidon and other major nobles in the Crusader states.
- The Teutonic Order is founded at Acre by German knights of Lübeck and Bremen. The Order is formed to aid Christians on their pilgrimages to the Holy Land and to establish hospitals (approximate date).

==== Europe ====
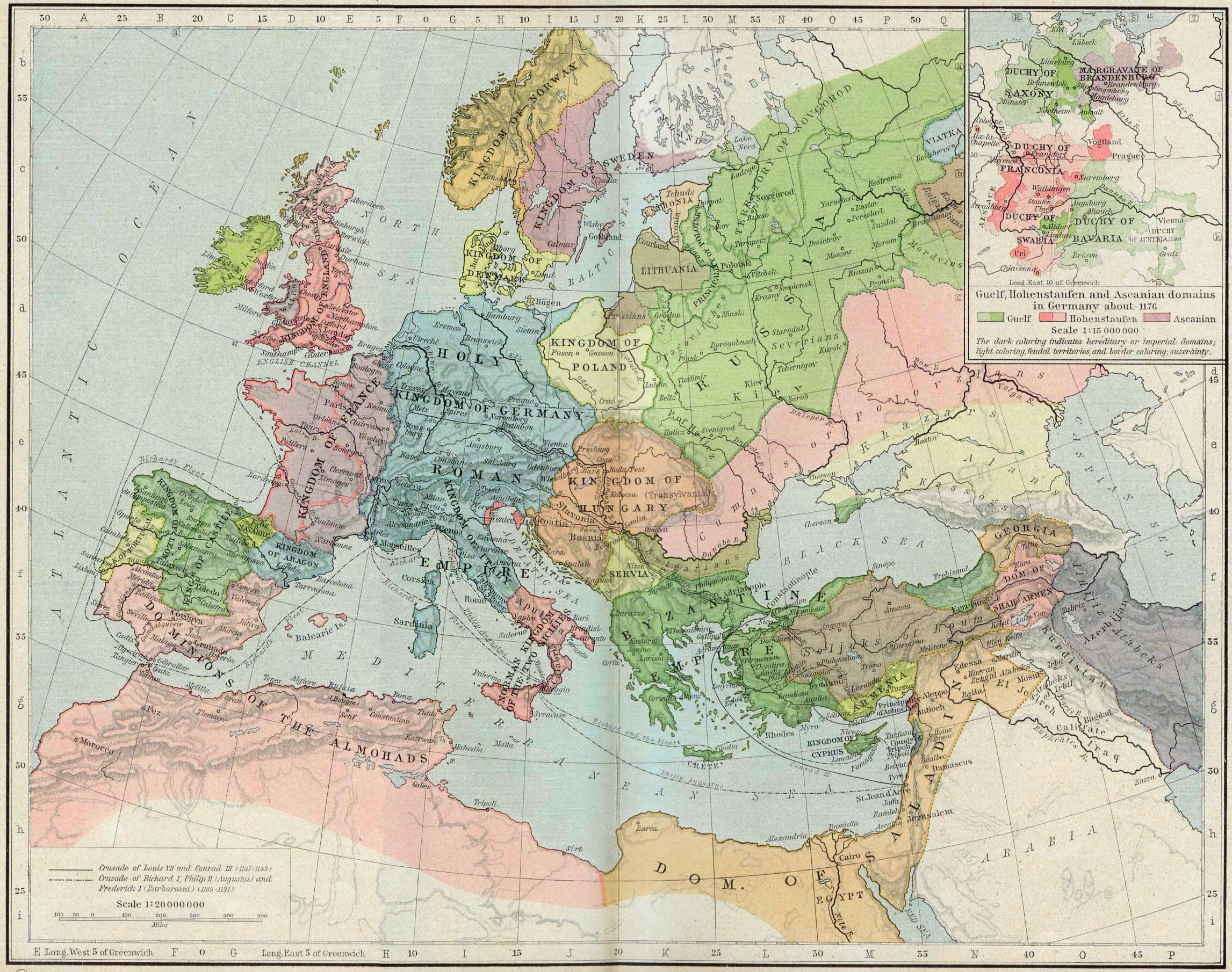
Europe in 1190

- July 4 – King Richard I (the Lion Heart) and Philip II (Augustus), meet at Vézelay and agree to divide the spoils of the Crusade equally between themselves. They march to the coast and then make their way across the Mediterranean, taking different routes. Richard travels with an expeditionary force (some 17,000 men) via Marseille and Philip travels with a smaller contingent (some 15,000 men) via Genoa. Richard has some 100 ships at his disposal, several of which are from Norman ports, others from Shoreham and Southampton.
- September – Richard I arrives in Sicily at the head of a Crusader army and demands the release of his sister Joan of England, queen of Sicily, who is held hostage by the usurper Tancred of Lecce. He also demands that Tancred fulfill the financial commitments made by the late King William II (the Good) to the Crusade. Tancred refuses the financial demand but he agrees to release Joan, on September 28.
- October 4 – Richard I captures Messina, after looting and burning the city he establishes his base there. Richard insists that his own banner be erected over the city, but this creates tension between Richard and Philip II, who has joined him with his forces. Tancred accepts a peace agreement, and pays Richard 20,000 ounces of gold. Friendly relations are restored, Richard agrees to split the gold with Philip.
- King Henry VI, eldest son of Frederick I, grants Henry I (the Brave) the title of Duke of Brabant. Henry tries to expand his power and soon quarrels with Count Baldwin V, duke of Hainaut.
- December – Richard I and Philip II stay in Sicily over the winter months waiting for the weather to improve before continuing their journey to the Holy Land.
- Siege of Silves – the Almohad caliph, Abu Yusuf Yaqub al-Mansur, fails to reconquer Silves, Portugal.

===== England =====
The English "feudal empire" of the Angevins in 1190

- London adopts the Cross of St. George, the red cross on a white background. The flag is also used by the fleet of Genoa, and allows the ships from London to use the flag for protection when they enter the Mediterranean on trading missions.
- March 16 – A massacre and mass-suicide of the Jews in York, results in the deaths of 150–500 Jews in Clifford's Tower.

=== By topic ===
==== Art and Science ====
- On the Harmony of Religions and Philosophy (ar. Kitab fasl al-maqal), by Averroes, is first published.
- Speculum Virginum, a German manuscript, is published (approximate date).

==== Education ====
- Emo of Friesland, a Frisian scholar and abbot, commences his study at what will become the University of Oxford.

==== Religion ====
- Cartmel Priory is founded by William Marshal, 1st Earl of Pembroke, in England.
- King Stefan Nemanja founds the Studenica Monastery in Serbia.

== Births ==
- July 24 – Yelü Chucai, Chinese statesman (d. 1244)
- December 30 – Ibn Abi'l-Hadid, Arab scholar (d. 1258)
- Benedetto Sinigardi, Italian Franciscan friar (d. 1282)
- Gerhard II of Lippe, German archbishop (d. 1258)
- Heinrich I von Müllenark, German archbishop (d. 1238)
- Helvis of Cyprus, princess of Antioch (approximate date)
- Henry II of Bar, French nobleman and knight (d. 1239)
- Ida of Nivelles, Belgian Cistercian nun and mystic (d. 1231)
- John (the Old), French nobleman and knight (d. 1267)
- Klement of Ruszcza, Polish nobleman and knight (d. 1256)
- Luce de Gast, English nobleman (approximate date)
- Maria of Brabant, Holy Roman Empress (d. 1260)
- Peter González (or Pedro), Castilian priest (d. 1246)
- Pietro della Vigna, Italian jurist and diplomat (d. 1249)
- Richer of Senones, French monk and chronicler (d. 1266)
- Roger I of Fézensaguet, French nobleman (d. 1245)
- Sayf al-Din al-Bakharzi, Persian theologian (d. 1261)
- Sorghaghtani Beki, mother of Kublai Khan (d. 1252)
- Tbeli Abuserisdze, Georgian scholar and writer (d. 1240)
- Theodora Angelina, Byzantine noblewoman (d. 1246)
- Vincent of Beauvais, French encyclopedist (d. 1264)
- William Marshal, English nobleman and knight (d. 1231)
- William Perault, French preacher and writer (d. 1271)
- Władysław Odonic, duke of Greater Poland (d. 1239)
- Yuan Haowen, Chinese politician and poet (d. 1257)
- Zulema L'Astròloga, Moorish astronomer (approximate date)

== Deaths ==
- February 18 – Otto II (the Rich), margrave of Meissen (b. 1125)
- March 15 – Isabella of Hainault, wife of Philip II (Augustus) (b. 1170)
- March 23 – Saigyō Hōshi, Japanese monk, poet and writer (b. 1118)
- June 10 – Frederick I (Barbarossa), Holy Roman Emperor (b. 1122)
- July 25 – Sibylla (or Sibylle), queen of Jerusalem (b. 1160)
- July 29 – Maud of Gloucester (or Matilda), English countess
- July - Ngô Lý Tín, Vietnamese general and politician of the Lý dynasty (b. 1126)
- August 1 – Floris III, Dutch nobleman and knight (b. 1141)
- August 16 – Dedi III (the Fat), German nobleman (b. 1130)
- August 21 – Godfrey III, count of Louvain (House of Reginar)
- September 13 – Herman IV, German nobleman (b. 1135)
- September 20 – Adelog of Hildesheim, German bishop
- October 16 – Louis III (the Mild), German nobleman
- November 3 – Diepold of Berg, German bishop (b. 1140)
- November 19 – Baldwin of Forde, English archbishop
- November 21 – Děpolt II (or Diepold), German nobleman
- Bernard II de Balliol, Norman nobleman (approximate date)
- Chrétien de Troyes, French poet, trouvère and writer
- Geoffrey IV (the Younger), French nobleman and knight
- Judah ben Saul ibn Tibbon, Arab-Jewish translator (or 1191)
- Maria Komnene, queen of Hungary and Croatia (b. 1144)
- Ramon I de Montcada, Catalan nobleman (b. 1150)
- Ranulf de Glanvill, English Chief Justiciar and writer
- Robert de Beaumont (White-Hands), English nobleman
- Walkelin de Derby (de Ferrers), Norman nobleman
- Walter de Clifford (or FitzRichard), English nobleman
