= Richeza of Berg =

Bohemian noblewoman (c.1095–1125)

- Duchess of Bohemia
- Born: c. 1095
- Died: 27 September 1125
- Buried: Reichenbach Abbey
- Spouse: Vladislaus I, Duke of Bohemia
- Issue: Vladislaus II, Duke of Bohemia; Děpold I of Jamnitz
- Father: Henry I, Count of Berg
- Mother: Adelheid of Mochental

Richeza of Berg (Czech: Richenza z Bergu; c. 1095 – 27 September 1125) was Duchess of Bohemia from 1111 to 1117 and again from 1120 until 1125, by her marriage with the Přemyslid duke Vladislav I.

She was the daughter of Swabian, Henry I, Count of Berg (d. 1116) and his wife Adelheid of Mochental (d. 1127), a daughter of the Bavarian margrave Diepold II of Vohburg. Adelheid's elder brother, Margrave Diepold III, was a loyal follower of Emperor Henry V; his daughter Adelaide married the Hohenstaufen duke (and later Emperor) Frederick Barbarossa in 1147. Richinza was named after her maternal great-grandmother Richwara, wife of Duke Berthold I of Zähringen.

About 1110/1111 Richeza married Vladislav, who ruled the Duchy of Bohemia since 1109; her sister Sophia married another Přemyslid prince, Otto II the Black, in 1114. The third sister, Salomea of Berg (d. 1144), married the Piast duke of Poland, Bolesław III Wrymouth, in 1115. Richeza and Salomea ensured peace between their Bohemian and Polish husbands.

The ducal couple founded the Benedictine monastery of Kladruby in 1115; Richeza also made several donations to Zwiefalten Abbey in her Swabian homelands. Through the intercession of his wife, in 1125 the dying Duke Vladislav I chose his cousin Prince Otto II the Black as his successor. Only the intervention of his mother, the aged queen dowager Świętosława (Svatava), changed his mind and Vladislav reconciled with his younger brother Soběslav.

While Soběslav became duke upon Vladislav's death, the disappointed Richeza had to flee from Bohemia. She wished to retire to Zwiefalten Abbey, however, she died on the way on 27 September 1125. She is buried in Reichenbach Abbey in Bavaria. Her eldest son Vladislav II succeeded to the Prague throne after Duke Soběslav's death in 1140.

== Issue ==
- Svatava (Luitgarda; died after 1146)
- Vladislav II (c. 1110 – 18 January 1174), Duke of Bohemia from 1140, Bohemian king from 1158
- Děpold I of Jamnitz (died August 1167)
- Jindřich (Henry; died after 1169), father of Duke Bretislav III

== Literature ==
- KAREŠOVÁ, Z.; PRAŽÁK, J. Královny a kněžny české. Prague : X-Egem, 1996.

Richeza of Berg Born: c. 1095 Died: 27 September 1125
Royal titles
Preceded by Helbirga of Austria	Duchess consort of Bohemia; 1111–1117	Succeeded by Helbirga of Austria
Preceded by Helbirga of Austria	Duchess consort of Bohemia; 1120–1125	Succeeded by Adelaide of Hungary
