= Otto von Berg =

Bishop of Freising from 1184 to 1220

- Bishop of Freising
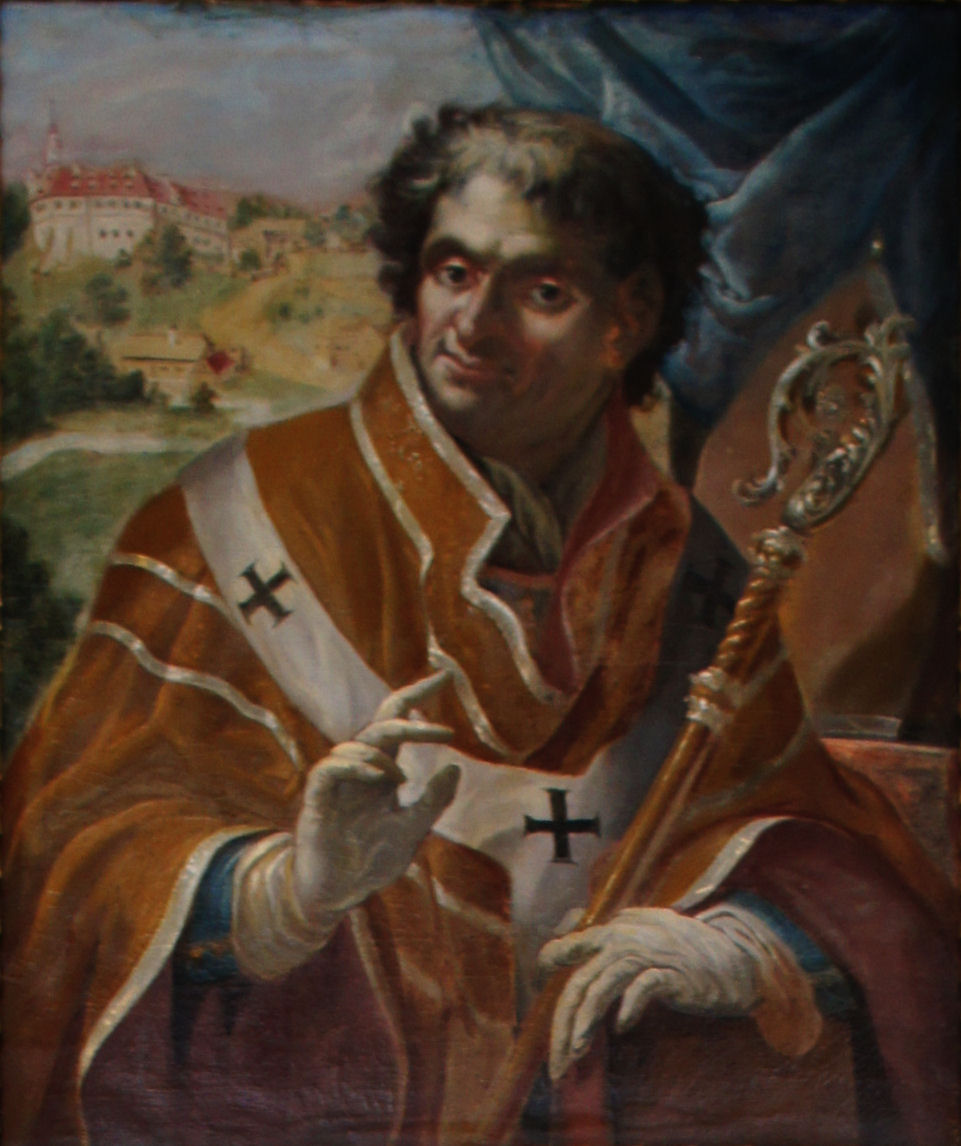
- Painting of Bishop Otto II by Franz Joseph Lederer (1676–1733), from the episcopal palace in Freising
- Diocese: Freising
- In office: December 1184 – 17 March 1220
- Predecessor: Albert of Harthausen
- Successor: Gerold von Waldeck

Personal details
- Died: 17 March 1220
- Denomination: Roman Catholic

Otto von Berg (died 17 March 1220) was a German bishop and author. He was the bishop of Freising (as Otto II) from 1184 until his death. Like his predecessor, Otto I, he was a supporter of the Hohenstaufen monarchs, regularly attending the courts of Emperors Frederick I and Henry VI and siding with Philip of Swabia in the German throne dispute after 1198.

== Life ==
Otto was the son of Diepold II, Count of Berg-Schelklingen, and Gisela of the House of Andechs. His brothers Diepold, Manegold and Henry were also bishops. Otto was a canon at the cathedral of Magdeburg before his election as bishop. In 1189 he obtained juridical rights, market rights and Burgrecht in the possessions of his diocese in the Duchy of Austria. After the disputed imperial election of 1198, he initially sided with Philip of Swabia, but is later found in the following of Otto IV. In 1215 he paid homage to Frederick II.

== Works ==
Around 1200, he composed the "Laubacher Barlaam", a Middle High German translation of a 12th-century Middle Latin version of the legend of Barlaam and Josaphat. His version is not to be confused with the verse romance Barlaam und Josaphat (c. 1220) of Rudolf von Ems.

Otto's Barlaam is 16,500 lines of poetry, one third of which concerns the religious and baptismal instruction, usually in dialogue form, of Josaphat by Barlaam. Otto often compares Barlaam to Saint Anthony the Great for their shared asceticism. Josaphat gives long speeches to his angry father, the king, and to the people. The most interesting aspect to the modern reader is Otto's description of different religions: Chaldaean "astrology and occult arts", Greek anthropomorphism, Egyptian cults of plants and animals, and euhemerism. In this, he relies on earlier Christian writings, notably John of Damascus and perhaps also Lactantius (an influential Christian euhemerist).

Catholic Church titles
Preceded by Albert of Harthausen	Bishop of Friesing; 1184 – 1220	Succeeded by Gerold von Waldeck
