= Henry of Berg =

Several German nobleman were called Henry of Berg (German: Heinrich von Berg). They are divided into two families referring to different places named Berg. These are:

- Henry of the County of Berg in Ehingen (later the Margraviate of Burgau)
  1. Henry I, Count of Berg (d. 1115), the second ruler of the Berg-Schelklingen family
  2. Henry II, Count of Berg (d. 1126), son of the previous
  3. Henry, Bishop of Passau and Würzburg (d. 1193), nephew of the previous
  4. Henry I, Margrave of Burgau (d. 1242), nephew of the previous
  5. Henry II, Margrave of Burgau (d. 1293/1294), son of the previous
  6. Henry III, Margrave of Burgau (d. after 1301), son of the previous
- Henry of the County of Berg in Solingen (later the Duchy of Berg)
  1. Henry IV, Duke of Limburg and Count of Berg (d. 1247), married to the Ezzonid family heiress
  2. Henry, Lord of Windeck (d. 1290/1296), grandson of the previous
  3. Henry, Canon at Cologne (d. 1310), son of the previous
