= Battle of Loděnice =

Historical clash between two Bohemian princes

Date	23 January 1179
Location	Loděnice, Duchy of Bohemia 49°59′43″N 14°9′26″E
Result	Victory of Soběslav II

Belligerents
Soběslav II	Bedřich

Casualties and losses
Unknown	Probably hundreds

The Battle of Loděnice was a conflict that took place in 23 January 1179 near the village Loděnice. It was a clash between two Bohemian princes over the succession of the duchy. Soběslav II defeated Bedřich, who was forced to flee.

Despite Soběslav's significant victory, he was eventually routed by Bedřich and Czech prince, Konrád II Ota, who overthrew Soběslav, at the end of the war. Therefore, Bedřich took the throne, however his reign caused many problems.

== Background ==
In 1178, Emperor Frederick Barbarossa granted Bedřich the Prague throne. This was because Soběslav had been plundering churches and church goods in 1176 as Austrian Duke Henry Jasomirgott refused to return Vitorazsko, an area recently colonized by the Austrians. Bedřich then set out on a campaign in Bohemia, marching through Plzeň to Prague. Dissatisfied, Soběslav summoned an army but were quickly sieged and defeated by Bedřich, forcing Soběslav to take refuge in Skála Castle. Soběslav left the castle at the end of summer. Václav Olomúcky, one of Soběslav's allies, also defected to escape his fate.

== Battle ==
Bedřich's army rested near a river called Mže and set up tents in a place called Brod, they stayed there for seven days. Then, on January 23, in a stream called Loděnice, Soběslav's army unexpectedly struck and captured the careless guards-and due to the cold, no one could tell what was happening. After that, a bloody battle took place. Captain Vitek and many other nobles were captured by Soběslav and most of them were killed or had their noses cut off to humiliate them.

== Aftermath ==
Soběslav, pleased with his victory, attempted to invade Prague. However, he lost because the citizens had been warned in advance and sufficiently defended Prague. Alžběta, Bedřich's wife, also promptly sent a messenger to Bedřich, who was in congress. As a result, Soběslav lost the war. Soběslav again fled to Skála and died there without an heir in 1180. Bedřich received the throne but was later expelled and replaced by Konrád II. Ota.
