= Děpolt II =

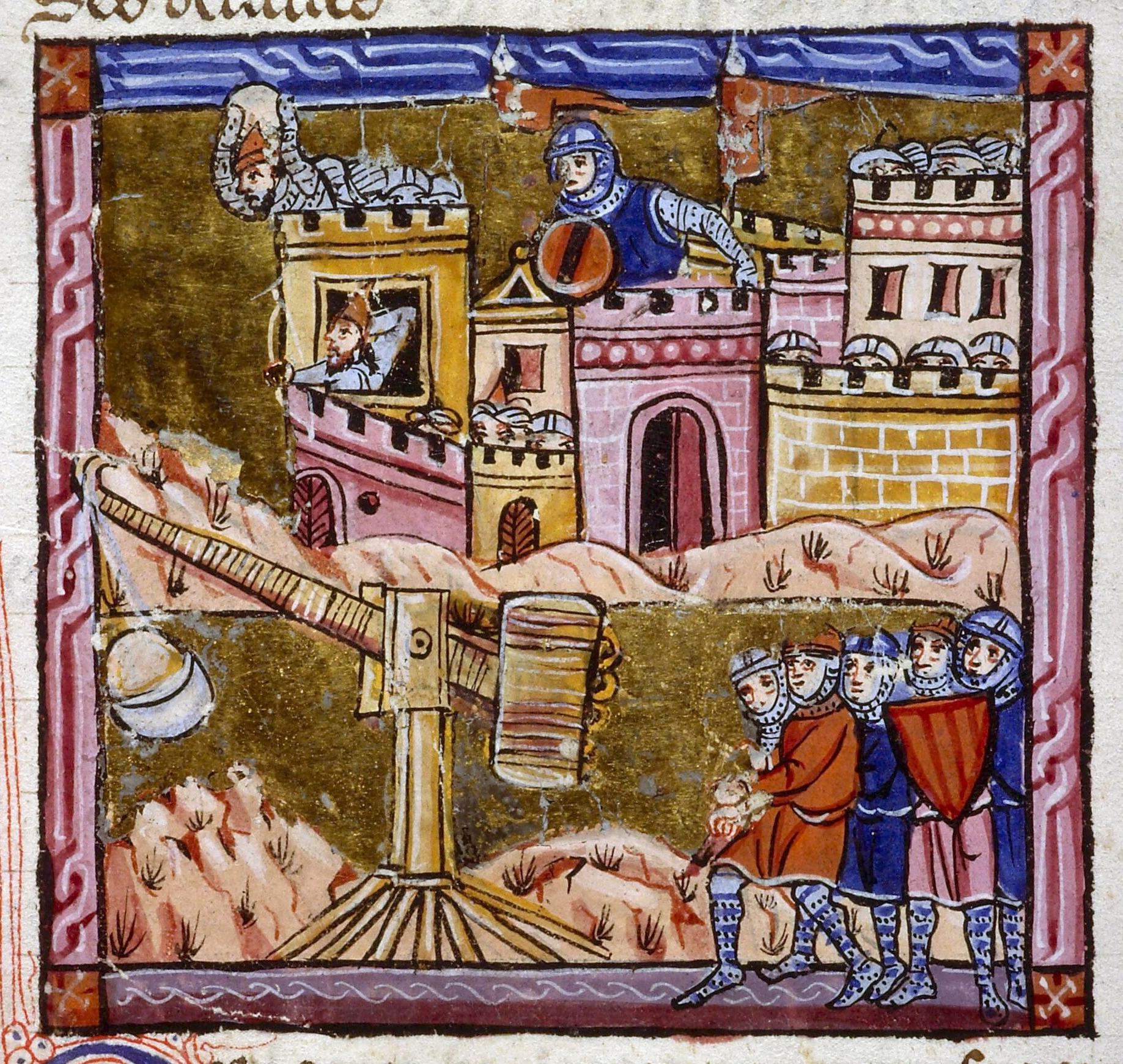
13th-century depiction of the siege of Antioch which took place in 1097–1098. It is from an illuminated manuscript of William of Tyre's Historia rerum in partibus transmarinis gestarum.

Děpolt II (1150s – 21 November 1190), also known as Diepold II (modern English Theobald), was a Bohemian nobleman from the cadet branch of the Přemyslid dynasty and the leader of the Bohemian troop in the Third Crusade.

== Life ==
Děpolt II was the only son of Děpolt I (son of Duke Vladislav I of Bohemia) and of his wife Gertrude (daughter of Albert the Bear of Brandenburg).

He was first mentioned after the death of his father. He had a good relationship with the Duke Frederick of Bohemia (Czech: Bedřich), his cousin. After 1182 he was in dispute with his other cousin Bishop of Prague Jindřich Břetislav (Henry Bretislaus, later known as Duke Bretislaus III of Bohemia). The bishop imposed an interdict on Děpolt's land (the regions of Čáslav, Chrudim and Vraclav). In 1187 he emigrated and came back in 1189 when Conrad II became the new duke of Bohemia.

In 1189 Conrad II appointed Děpolt I to lead the Bohemian troop in the Third Crusade. The Bohemian troop joined the crusaders led by the Holy Roman Emperor Frederick Barbarossa in Esztergom, Hungary. Many of the Bohemian soldiers were former prisoners who were freed just to participate the crusade (8 of them were executed by Frederick Barbarossa because of their violence and robbery already in Serbia). After the death of Frederick Barbarossa in the Saleph River on 10 June 1190 Děpolt II decided to stay in the Holy Land and to continue under the command of Frederick VI, Duke of Swabia. He took part in the siege of Acre in autumn 1190. There he also died on 21 November 1190, maybe because of a war injury or plague. The surviving rest of his troop then probably became a part of the troop of King Richard I of England.

== Marriage and children ==
Děpolt II was married to Adéla/Adelajda Zbysława of Silesia, the daughter of Bolesław I the Tall. They had:

- Děpolt III
- Soběslav I
- Boleslaus

== Sources ==
- Wihoda, Martin (2015). Vladislaus Henry: The Formation of Moravian Identity. Brill.
