= Vladislaus I of Bohemia =

Vladislaus I of Bohemia may refer to:

- Vladislaus I, Duke of Bohemia, died 1125
- Vladislaus II, Duke of Bohemia, from 1158 ruled as a king as Vladislaus I, died 1174
