= Wenceslaus of Bohemia =

Wenceslaus of Bohemia may refer to:

- Wenceslaus I, Duke of Bohemia (907–935 or 929), saint and subject of the Christmas carol "Good King Wenceslas"
- Wenceslaus II, Duke of Bohemia (died 1192)
- Wenceslaus I of Bohemia (c. 1205–1253), King of Bohemia
- Wenceslaus II of Bohemia (1271–1305), grandson of Wenceslaus I, King of Bohemia and Poland
- Wenceslaus III of Bohemia (1289–1306), son of Wenceslaus II, King of Hungary, Bohemia, and Poland
- Wenceslaus IV of Bohemia (1361–1419), great-grandson of Wenceslaus II, King of Bohemia, and German King
