= Oldřich of Olomouc =

Bohemian noble (1134–1177)

- Born: 1134
- Died: 18 October 1177
- Noble family: Přemyslid dynasty
- Spouses: Cecilia of Thuringia; Sophia of Meissen
- Father: Soběslav I, Duke of Bohemia
- Mother: Adelaide of Hungary

Udalrich of Olomouc (also known as Ulrich, Czech: Oldřich; Latin: Oldericus; 1134 – 18 October 1177) was Duke in Hradec Králové (eastern Bohemia) from 1152 till 1153 and between 1173–1177 ruled the appanage of Olomouc (as Duke of Olomouc), one of three ducal regions in Moravia, then part of the Duchy of Bohemia.

== Family ==
Born as a member of the Přemyslid dynasty, a younger son of Duke Sobeslaus I and his wife Adelaide (daughter of Prince Álmos of Hungary). Name Oldřich wore as the third in his dynasty. Both of Udalrich′s brothers, Sobeslaus II and Wenceslaus II became the Dukes of Bohemia; his sister Maria was Margravine of Austria and Duchess of Bavaria by marriage.

== Life ==
Allegedly, Udalrich promised Emperor Frederick Barbarossa in 1152 a large sum of money if Barbarossa would enfeoff Udalrich rather than his cousin Vladislaus II with the Duchy of Bohemia. After an intervention by Bishop Daniel I of Prague, all parties agreed that Vladislaus II would be Duke of Bohemia (in 1158 he became the second King of Bohemia) and Udalrich would receive Hradec Castle (present-day city of Hradec Králové) along with the surrounding region.

The agreement did not last long, and Udalrich fled into exile in Poland, and from there to the Emperor's court, where he was active from 1162 as a loyal supporter of the Emperor. He participated in several of Barbarossa's Italian campaigns.

King Vladislaus II abdicated in 1172 in favour of his son Frederick; nevertheless this act – until then unusual – met with strong resistance of Bohemian nobles and even the Emperor reject to acknowledge Frederick as rightful ruler. The following year he dethroned him and throne of Bohemia was offered to Ulrich. However, Udalrich declined the honour (because he wanted to keep seniority principle established in Přemyslid dynasty already in the mid of 11th century) and renounced the rule over Bohemia in favour to his elder brother Sobeslaus II. Grateful brother rewarded him by reign in the most important part of Moravia, i.e. the Duchy of Olomouc.

Udalrich married twice. His first wife was Cecilia, the daughter of Landgrave Louis I of Thuringia. His second wife was Sophia, the daughter of Margrave Otto II of Meissen.

== Ancestry ==
Ancestors of Oldřich of Olomouc

16. Oldřich of Bohemia
8. Bretislaus I of Bohemia
17. Božena
4. Vratislaus II of Bohemia
18. Henry of Schweinfurt
9. Judith of Schweinfurt
19. Gerberga of Henneberg
2. Soběslav I, Duke of Bohemia
20. Mieszko II Lambert of Poland
10. Casimir I of Poland
21. Richeza of Lotharingia
5. Świętosława of Poland
22. Vladimir the Great of Kiev
11. Maria Dobroniega of Kiev
1. Udalrich II, Duke of Moravia
24. Béla I of Hungary
12. Géza I of Hungary
25. Adelaide of Poland
6. Prince Álmos of Hungary
26. Theodoulos Synadenos
13. Synadene
3. Adelaide of Hungary
28. Iziaslav I of Kiev
14. Sviatopolk II of Kiev
29. Gertrude of Poland
7. Predslava of Kiev

Other offices
Preceded by Frederick	Duke of Olomouc; 1173–77	Succeeded by Vladimír
