= Peter of Kastl =

German translator

Peter of Kastl (c. 1400) was a Benedictine monk who very probably composed a translation of Boethius's Consolation of Philosophy (c. 524).

== Biography ==
The most important evidence for Peter's existence can be found in Andreas of Regensburg's Chronicon Generale (1422).

Eodem anno magister Petrus presbiter professus, Boecium de consolatione philosophiae transtulit de latino in teutonicum. Hic sepultus est in Castello, vulgariter zu Chastel. (In the same year [1401] Magister Peter, presbyter at the Kastl monastery, appointed in Reichenbach, translated Boethius's De Consolatione Philolsophiae from Latin into German. He is buried here in Castello, also called Chastel.)

In the chronicles of the Upper Palatinate monastery of Reichenbach, there is also mention of a provost by the name of Peter in the entries for the years 1397, 1398, 1400, 1406 and 1408. This provost was identified in 1958 as the translator of the Consolatio Philosophiae mentioned by Andreas of Regensburg. The translation was probably lost during the seventeenth century. An anonymous translation, that was printed around 1473 by Anton Koberger in Nuremberg and reprinted in 1500 by Johann Schott in Strasbourg, is sometimes identified with Peter's translation. Though this is not completely impossible, it seems rather improbable for various reasons.
