= Adelaide of Hungary (died 1140) =

Duchess consort of Bohemia (1105–1140)

- Duchess consort of Bohemia
- Born: Between 1105 and 1107
- Died: 15 September 1140
- Spouse: Soběslav I, Duke of Bohemia
- Issue: Maria of Bohemia; Soběslav II; Oldřich of Olomouc; Wenceslaus
- House: House of Árpád
- Father: Prince Álmos
- Mother: Predslava of Kiev

Adelaide of Bohemia (1105 or 1107 – 15 September 1140) was the daughter of Prince Álmos of Hungary and his wife Predslava of Kiev, the daughter of Sviatopolk II great prince of Kiev. Adelaide's father was a son of King Géza I of Hungary and was Duke and later King of East Slavonia.

Adelaide married Soběslav I, Duke of Bohemia. They had at least five children:

1. Vladislaus, Duke at Olomouc
2. Maria
3. Soběslav II (~1128–1180), Duke of Bohemia
4. Udalrich II (1134–1170), Duke at Olomouc
5. Wenceslaus II (1137–1192), Duke of Bohemia

== Sources ==
- Raffensperger, Christian (2007). "Russian Economic and Marital Policy: An Initial Analysis of Correlations". Russian History. 34 (1/4, "FESTSCHRIFT" FOR RICHARD HELLIE: Part 1 (Spring-Summer-Fall-Winter 2007 / Printemps-Été-Automne-Hiver): 149–159. doi:10.1163/187633107X00086.
- Raffensperger, Christian (2018). Conflict, Bargaining, and Kinship Networks in Medieval Eastern Europe. Lexington Books.

Royal titles
Preceded by Richeza of Berg	Duchess consort of Bohemia; 1125–1140	Succeeded by Gertrude of Babenberg
