= Conrad II of Znojmo =

Conrad II
- Duke of Znojmo
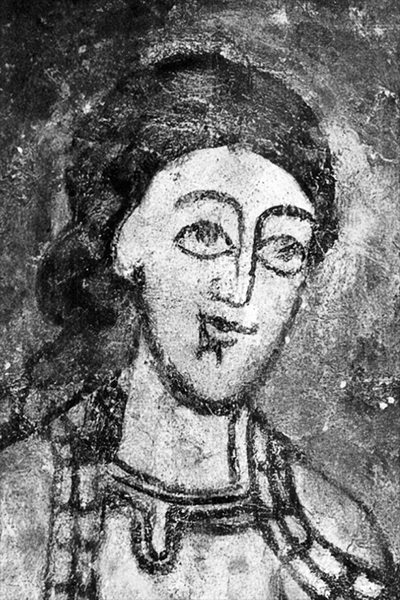
- Conrad II depicted at the Znojmo Rotunda
- Died: 1161
- Noble family: Přemyslid
- Spouse: Maria of Serbia
- Issue: Conrad II, Duke of Bohemia; Helen of Znojmo
- Father: Luitpold of Znojmo
- Mother: Ida of Austria

Conrad II of Znojmo (Czech: Konrád II. Znojemský; d. 1161), a member of the Přemyslid dynasty, was a Bohemian prince who ruled in the Moravian principality of Znojmo from 1123 to 1128 and again from 1134 until his death.

== Life ==
Conrad II was the son of Prince Luitpold of Znojmo and his wife Ida, a daughter of the Babenberg margrave Leopold II of Austria. Upon his father's death in 1112, Znojmo passed to his uncle Ulrich I of Brno, who died the next year. From 1115 onwards, both the Brno and Znojmo principalities in Moravia were held by Soběslav I, youngest son of the late King Vratislaus II of Bohemia.

Finally, when Soběslav fell out with his elder brother Duke Vladislaus I of Bohemia in 1123, Conrad II was able to succeed his father in Znojmo. However, Duke Vladislaus died two years later and as the dynastic struggles culminated in the 1126 Battle of Chlumec, Soběslav had Conrad II deposed and imprisoned at Dohna Castle in 1128. In an attempt to reconcile with his Moravian cousin and to stabilise his rule in the Bohemian lands, Duke Soběslav reinstalled Conrad as Znojmo prince and also arranged his marriage with the Vukanović princess Maria (d. 1189), a daughter of Grand Prince Uroš I of Serbia.

When in 1140 Vladislaus II, son of the late Duke Vladislaus I, succeeded to the Bohemian throne, the Přemyslid quarrels broke out again. Two years later, Prince Conrad II gathered troops and together with his Brno and Olomouc cousins marched against Prague. However, while the castle was successfully defended by the duke's younger brother Prince Děpold I of Jamnitz, Vladislaus II himself proceeded to the court of King Conrad III of Germany in Würzburg and returned with a large royal army. The Moravian forces had to retire and Prince Conrad, excommunicated by the Olomouc bishop Jindřich Zdík, had to accept the Bohemian overlordship.

Conrad II commissioned the wall paintings (frescoes) of the Znojmo Rotunda some time after 1134.

== Family ==
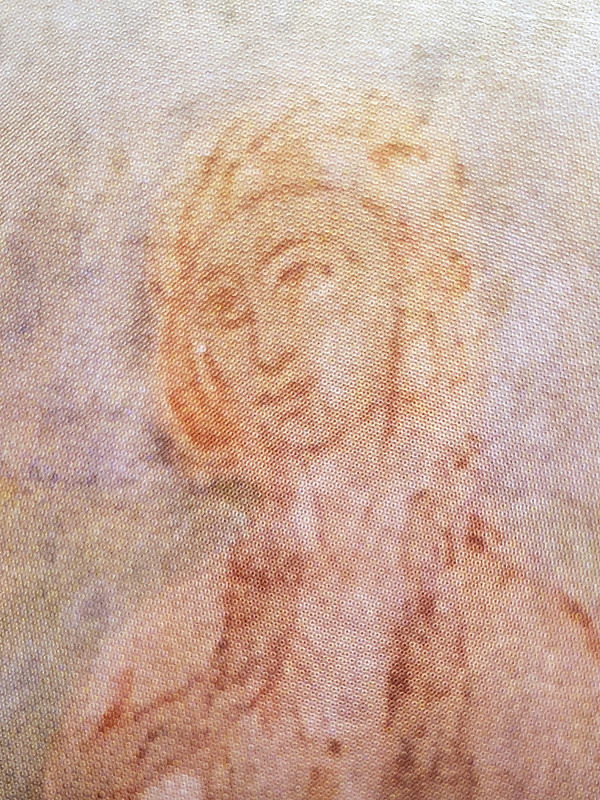
Mary of Serbia depicted at the Znojmo Rotunda

Conrad II married Maria of Serbia (Marija, known in Czech as "Marie Srbská"), a Serbian princess, daughter of Grand Prince Uroš I (r. 1112–45). They had five children, among them:

- Ernest (or Arnošt)
- Conrad III Ota (c. 1135 – 1191), married Hellicha of Wittelsbach, became first Margrave of Moravia in 1182, Duke of Bohemia (as Conrad II) from 1189
- Helena of Znojmo (c. 1141 – 1202/06), High Duchess of Poland by her marriage with Casimir II the Just.

== Sources ==
- Balcárek, Petr (2023). Byzantium in the Czech Lands (4th–16th centuries): Historical and Art Historical Perspectives. Leiden-Boston: Brill.
- Kalić, Jovanka (2016). "Grand Župan Uroš II of Rascia". Balcanica. 47: 75–96.
- Antonín Friedl (1966). Přemyslovci ve Znojmě. Odeon.
- Rostislav Nový (1972). Přemyslovský stát 11. a 12. století. Universita Karlova.
- Josef Žemlička (1997). Čechy v době knížecí, 1034-1198. Lidové Noviny. ISBN 978-80-7106-196-0.

Conrad II of Znojmo Přemyslid dynasty Died: 1161
Preceded by Soběslav I	Prince of Znojmo; 1123–1128; 1134–1161	Succeeded by Conrad III Ota
