= Battle of Olšava =

Coordinates: 48°58′N 17°37′E

The Battle of Olšava was an engagement of Bohemian and Hungarian troops near the Olšava River along the frontier of the two realms in May 1116. The event started as a peaceful meeting between the young Stephen II of Hungary and Vladislaus I of Bohemia, according to Hungarian chronicles. The Czech Cosmas of Prague wrote that the Hungarians came to the border to provocate a war.

== Sources ==
=== Primary sources ===
- Cosmas of Prague: The Chronicle of the Czechs (Translated with an introduction and notes by Lisa Wolverton) (2009). The Catholic University of America Press. ISBN 978-0-8132-1570-9.
- Bak, János M.; Veszprémy, László; Kersken, Norbert (2018). Chronica de gestis Hungarorum e codice picto saec. XIV [The Illuminated Chronicle: Chronicle of the deeds of the Hungarians from the fourteenth-century illuminated codex]. Budapest: Central European University Press. ISBN 978-9-6338-6264-3.

=== Secondary sources ===
- Kordé, Zoltán (1991). "A székelyek a XII. századi elbeszélő forrásokban [Székelys in the 12th-century narrative sources]". Acta Universitatis Szegediensis de Attila József nominatae. Acta Historica (in Hungarian). 92. MTA-SZTE-MOL Magyar Medievisztikai Kutatócsoport: 17–24. ISSN 0324-6965.
- Kristó, Gyula (2003). Háborúk és hadviselés az Árpádok korában [Wars and Tactics under the Árpáds] (in Hungarian). Szukits Könyvkiadó. ISBN 963-9441-87-2.
- Makk, Ferenc (1989). The Árpáds and the Comneni: Political Relations between Hungary and Byzantium in the 12th century (Translated by György Novák). Akadémiai Kiadó. ISBN 963-05-5268-X.
- Pandi, Gergely (2014). "Béketárgyalásból háború? Gondolatok az 1116. évi olšavai ütközethez [From Peace Negotiations to War? About the Battle of Olšava in 1116]". In Belucz, Mónika; et al. (eds.). Magister historiae (in Hungarian). Eötvös Loránd University. pp. 141–152. ISBN 978-963-284-527-2.
- Pauler, Gyula (1899). A magyar nemzet története az Árpád-házi királyok alatt, I. [The History of the Hungarian Nation during the Árpádian Kings, Vol. 1.] (in Hungarian). Athenaeum.
- Szabados, György (2007). "A régi magyar taktika Árpád-kori írott kútfőkben. A steppei eredetű harci műveltség nyomai és megjelenítése a XIII. század végéig [The Ancient Hungarian Tactics in the Written Sources of the Age of the Árpád Dynasty. Traces and Manifestations of the Warfare of the Steppes until the Late 13th Century]". Hadtörténelmi Közlemények (in Hungarian). 120 (2). Hadtörténeti Intézet és Múzeum: 475–500. ISSN 0017-6540.
