= Děpold I of Jamnitz =

Děpold I (also Děpolt, modern English Theobald) was the second son of Duke Vladislav I of Bohemia and brother of Duke and later King of Bohemia Vladislav II.

In 1145, he joined the other territorial dukes of Bohemia, Conrad II of Znojmo, Vratislaus II of Brno, and Otto III of Olomouc, to attack Jindřich (Henry) Zdík, bishop of Olomouc, and chase him from his diocese. For this, Děpold was excommunicated. Subsequently, he went on a pilgrimage to Rome for atonement.

In 1147, while his elder brother Vladislav II went on the Second Crusade as far as Byzantium, Děpold governed Bohemia. He ruled with a strong hand and prevented a seizure of power by the young Soběslav. In 1153, he married Gertrude, daughter of Albert the Bear, Margrave of Brandenburg. Afterwards, he joined his brother-in-law in military campaigns. In 1158, he went with the Emperor Frederick Barbarossa into Italy and was present at the siege of Milan. He would be the leader of several subsequent Bohemian expeditions to Italy. In 1167, he was joined by his nephew Frederick in leading a large force on behalf of King Vladislav. On that expedition, many noblemen died of an epidemic (possible plague or malaria), including Rainald of Dassel and Welf VII. Děpold was also among them.

Děpold and Gertrude had:

- Děpolt II (Theobald)
- Hedwig

== Sources ==
- Wihoda, Martin (2015). Vladislaus Henry: The Formation of Moravian Identity. Brill.
