= Helbirga of Austria =

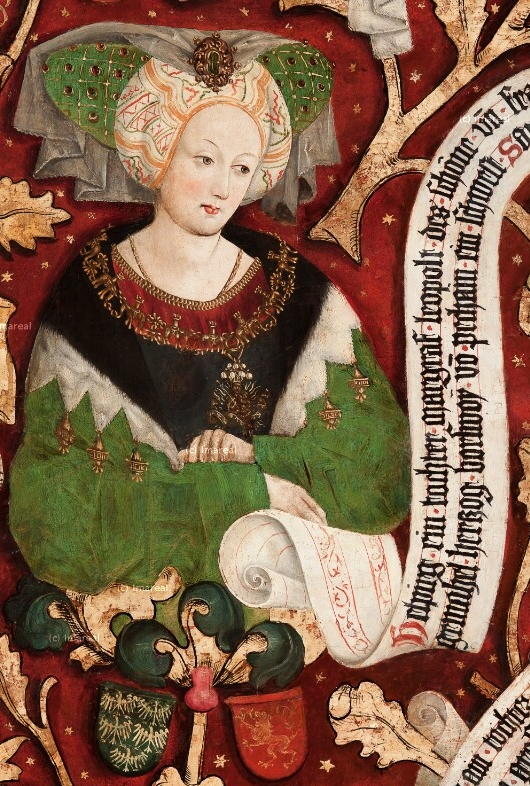
Helpirka (Gerberga) of Austria, Duchess of Bohemia

Helbirga of Austria (died 1142), was a Duchess consort of Bohemia, married to Bořivoj II, Duke of Bohemia.

The great wedding of Helbirga, daughter of Leopold II, Margrave of Austria, to Bořivo II was celebrated in October 1100 in Znojmo.

When Bořivoj fled to Hungary in 1120, she moved back to Austria where her brother Leopold III, Margrave of Austria, granted her sanctuary. She entered Göttweig Abbey where she eventually died in 1142.

Royal titles
Preceded by Lukarta of Bogen	Duchess consort of Bohemia; 1100–1111	Succeeded by Richeza of Berg
Preceded by Richeza of Berg	Duchess consort of Bohemia; 1117–1120	Succeeded by Richeza of Berg
