= Maria of Serbia, Duchess of Znojmo =

Serbian noblewoman and daughter of Uroš I

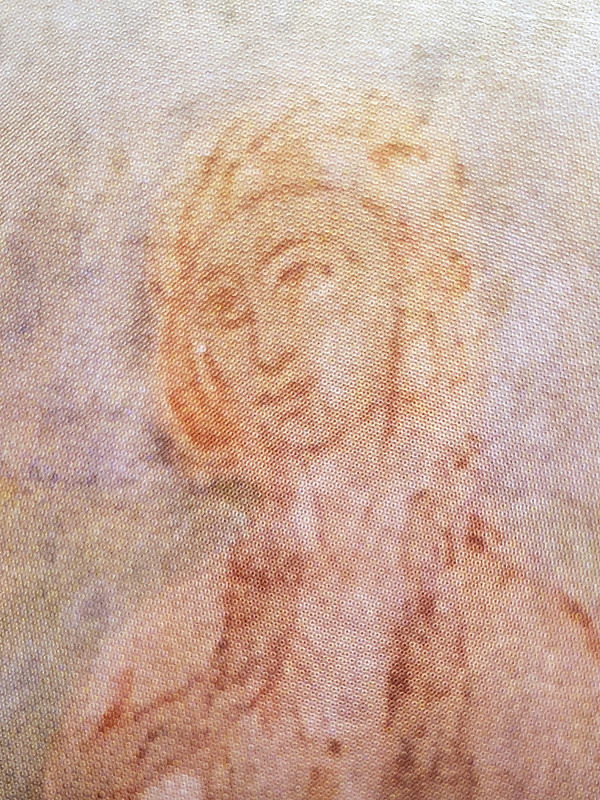
Maria od Serbia, Duchess of Znojmo, depicted at the Znojmo Rotunda

Maria (Serbian: Марија, Marija, Czech: Marie Srbská; fl. 1134–d. 1189) was Serbian princess and daughter of Uroš I, Grand Prince of Serbia. She was sister of Uroš II, Grand Prince of Serbia, and Helena, Queen of Hungary. Sometime before 1134, Maria was married to Conrad II, Duke of Znojmo, a Bohemian prince and a member of the Přemyslid dynasty.

Maria and Conrad had several children, including:

- Ernest of Znojmo
- Conrad II, Duke of Bohemia
- Helena of Znojmo

== Sources ==
- Balcárek, Petr (2023). Byzantium in the Czech Lands (4th–16th centuries): Historical and Art Historical Perspectives. Leiden-Boston: Brill.
- Bataković, Dušan T., ed. (2005). Histoire du peuple serbe [History of the Serbian People] (in French). Lausanne: L’Age d’Homme.
- Ćirković, Sima (2004). The Serbs. Malden: Blackwell Publishing.
- Kalić, Jovanka (2016). "Grand Župan Uroš II of Rascia". Balcanica. 47: 75–96.
- Živković, Tibor (2008). Forging unity: The South Slavs between East and West 550-1150. Belgrade: The Institute of History.
