= Conrad II of Bohemia =

12th-century Duke of Bohemia

Conrad II Otto
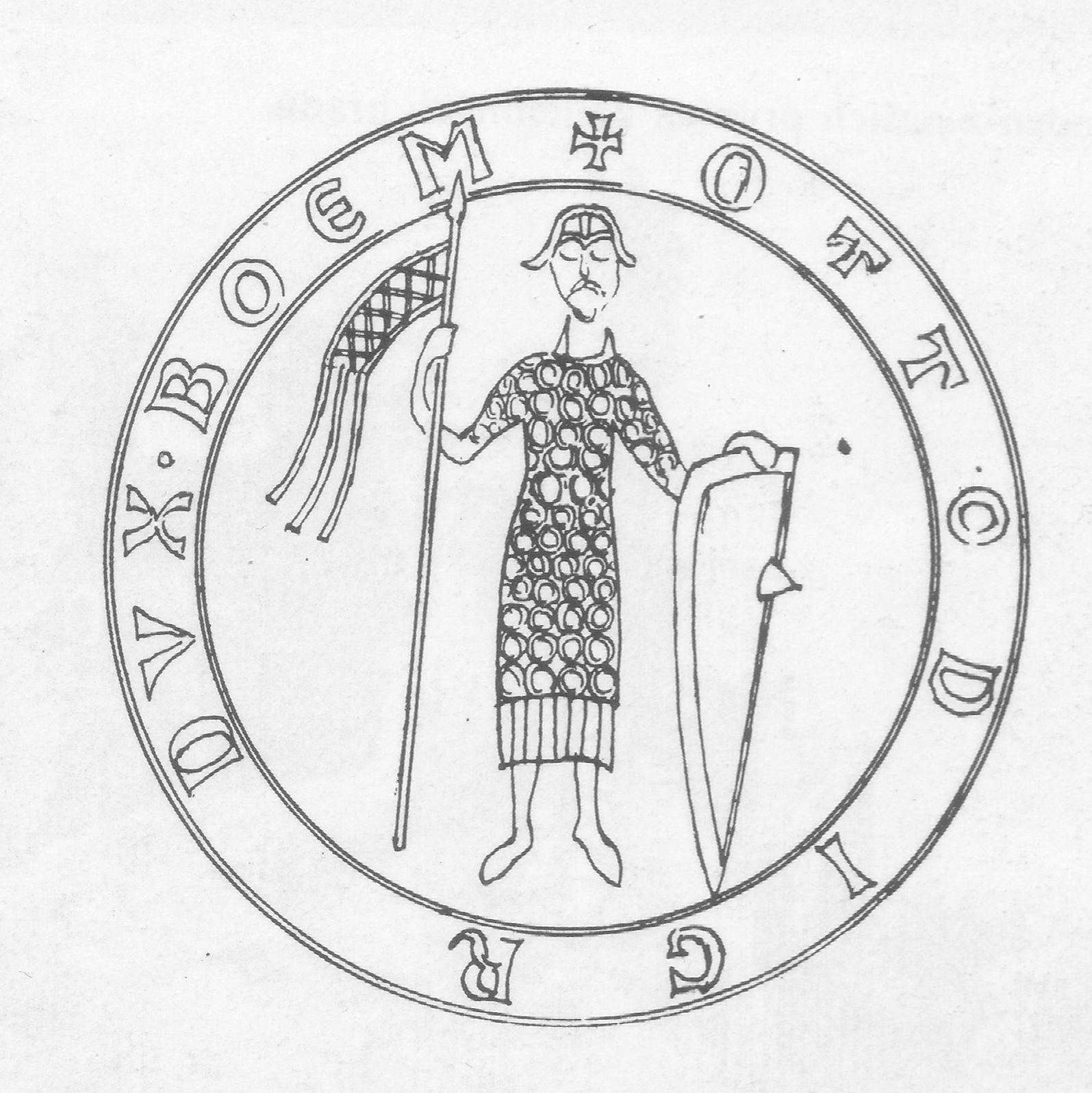
- Seal of Conrad II Otto

Duke of Bohemia
- Reign: March 1189 – 9 September 1191
- Predecessor: Frederick
- Successor: Wenceslaus II
- Born: c. 1136/1140
- Died: 9 September 1191 (aged c. 51–55) near Naples, Kingdom of Sicily
- Spouse: Hellicha of Wittelsbach
- Dynasty: Přemyslid
- Father: Conrad II of Znojmo
- Mother: Maria of Serbia

Conrad II Otto (Czech: Konrád II. Ota; c. 1136/1140 – 9 September 1191), a member of Přemyslid dynasty, was the first margrave of Moravia from 1182 to 1189 and duke of Bohemia from 1189 until his death.

== Family history ==
Conrad was the son of count Conrad II of Znojmo and Maria, a daughter of Grand Prince Uroš I of Serbia. Conrad was the grandson of Luitpold, the first ruler of the Přemyslid appanage of Znojmo in southern Moravia. Conrad's sister Helen of Znojmo became a Polish duchess by her marriage to High Duke Casimir II the Just.

== Rule over Znojmo ==
After the death of his father in 1161, he assumed the rule over the Znojmo principality. In 1173 he occupied the lands of Brno, which controlled more than the half of the Moravian territory (except for Olomouc) at that time. When in summer 1176 he also invaded the region north of the Danube that belonged to Duke Soběslav II of Bohemia, he became entangled in the duke's conflict with his nephew Frederick (Bedřich). Conrad attacked churches and monasteries and was excommunicated by Pope Alexander III.

After Frederick had again obtained the support of Emperor Frederick Barbarossa, Conrad and Duke Leopold V of Austria joined him on his campaign into Moravia and the occupation of Prague in 1178. Frederick was re-installed as Bohemian duke and Conrad expected to be rewarded with Olomouc, however, his hopes were dashed.

== Margrave of Moravia ==
Conrad took a chance on revenge when he rose against the unpopular Frederick in 1182. The duke fled from Prague and only with the emperor's consent was able to retain the Bohemian throne. At the same time, Frederick Barbarossa aimed at weakening his rule: he summoned the adversaries to the Imperial Diet at Regensburg, where he appointed Conrad ruler of the united principalities of Znojmo, Brno and Olomouc, elevated to the Margraviate of Moravia. Deliberately or not, these measures only fuelled the internal Přemyslid quarrels. The conflict between the Bohemian and the Moravian branches culminated in a bloody battle at Loděnice on 10 December 1185, after which both sides chose to enter into peace negotiations. Conrad and Frederick met at Knín, where the margrave recognised Frederick's suzerainty and was acknowledged in turn as ruler of Moravia by the duke and as his successor upon his death.

== Duke of Bohemia ==
When Frederick died on 25 March 1189, Conrad was made duke with the unanimous support of the Bohemian nobility. He renounced his margravial title in order to unite the Bohemian and Moravian lands under his rule. In May of that year, he received the formal affirmation of the emperor. Conrad assumed an active role in Imperial politics, arbitrating in the conflict around the disputed succession of Margrave Otto II of Meissen.

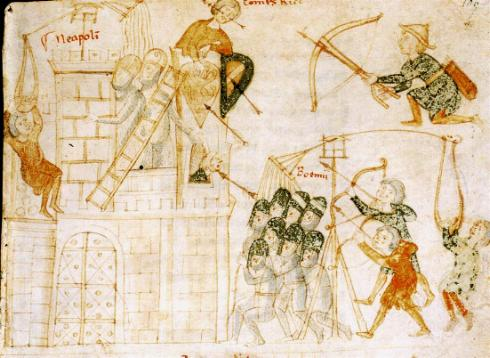
Bohemian forces (r.) besieging Naples, Peter of Eboli, Liber ad honorem Augusti, Palermo, 1196

During his short reign in Bohemia, Duke Conrad was beholden to the nobles. He was forced to concede them a set of privileges by the iura Conradi (Czech: Statuta Konrádova), the first Bohemian codex issued at Sadská in 1189. Among the concessions were these:

- freemen guaranteed against the abuses of the duke or the provincial courts under his župans
- extension of the right of inheritance to the daughters and brothers of deceased lords
- confiscation of property only after a long legal procedure conforming to local custom.

In 1190, Conrad and his mother Maria founded the Premonstratensian Louka Abbey in Znojmo.

Released from the obligation of participating in the Third Crusade, Conrad accompanied Henry VI, the emperor's son, to Southern Italy as part of his attempt to conquer the Kingdom of Sicily from Tancred in right of Henry's wife Constance. On the campaign, Conrad died of the plague in an Imperial military camp near besieged Naples. First buried in Monte Cassino Abbey, his mortal remains were later transferred to Prague.

Conrad's marriage with Hellicha of Wittelsbach remained childless. He was succeeded by Wenceslaus II, a younger brother of late Duke Soběslav II of Bohemia.

== Sources ==
- Balcárek, Petr (2023). Byzantium in the Czech Lands (4th–16th centuries): Historical and Art Historical Perspectives. Leiden-Boston: Brill.
- Kalić, Jovanka (2016). "Grand Župan Uroš II of Rascia". Balcanica. 47: 75–96.

Conrad II of Bohemia Přemyslid dynasty Born: c. 1136 Died: 9 September 1191
New title	Margrave of Moravia; 1182–1189	Vacant Title next held by Vladislaus Henry
Preceded by Frederick	Duke of Bohemia; 1189–1191	Succeeded by Wenceslaus II
