= Ngo Lý Tin =

Vietnamese general under Emperor Lý Cao Tông

Ngô Lý Tín (Chinese: 吳理信, 20 January 1126 – July 1190) was a Vietnamese general and politician who served under Emperor Lý Cao Tông during the Lý dynasty. Starting his career in the royal court in his 50s, he contributed to several military campaigns during the early days of Cao Tông’s reign and helped tutor the child monarch. His death in 1190, along with the death of Tô Hiến Thành in the previous years, marked the beginning of the decline of Cao Tông's rule. Gắm temple, a monument to him is located in the village of Cam Khe.

== Early life ==
According to historical records at Gắm temple in Hai Phong, Ngô Lý Tín was born on January 20, 1126 in Vĩnh Đồng village, Khoái Châu district, Sơn Nam town, which is present-day Hưng Yên. His father was Ngô Huy Hiếu and mother was Đào Thị Phúc. When he was 18, his parents died. He decided to leave his hometown and moved to Cẩm Khê village in Hải Dương province, where he opened a school, became a teacher, and practiced martial arts with his students. There are no clear historical sources explaining how he acquired the scholarly knowledge and martial arts skills necessary to open this school, aside from accounts from the Ngô clan, which claim that he was trained by a renowned Confucian scholar in his youth. However, this account from the Ngô clan cannot be considered an official historical source, as its origin is unknown.

After some time, his reputation became well known throughout the region. In 1175, emperor Lý Anh Tông died, crown prince Long Trát succeeded, as emperor Lý Cao Tông. The first days of Cao Tong witnessed some social unrest caused by bandit activities throughout the nation. The royal court issued an imperial edict calling for talented and virtuous individuals to assist in governing the country. Lý Tín recruited a total of 30 talented men to join him in intensive martial arts training, before presenting themselves to the royal court. Following his presentation, he was formally appointed by the royal court. He was in his fifties at the time. Although this is not explicitly stated in historical records, it can be inferred that he was appointed as a military official (rather than a civil official), since from that point onward he led the national army in suppressing bandits and confronting neighboring states during the first fifteen years of Lý Cao Tông’s reign.

== As Cao Tông's general ==
In 1182, Đại Việt still faced bandit activities resulting from social unrest caused by the famine in April of the previous year. Emperor Cao Tông appointed Ngô Lý Tín as a colonel general then ordered him to lead both infantry and navy forces to suppress the bandits. This is the very first time that Ngô Lý Tín was mentioned in the official historical records. Historical records at Gắm temple claimed he suppressed pirates for the event of that year. Until 1183, the emperor ordered Ngô Lý Tín to launch a campaign against Laos. In the winter of 1184, people in the villages of Tư Nông, Trịnh, and Ô Mễ—located in what are now parts of Hà Nội and Phú Thọ—rose in rebellion against the emperor. Emperor Cao Tông appointed the eunuch and Grand Tutor Vương Nhân Từ to suppress the uprising. Nhân Từ initially defeated the rebels in the villages of Đông Bái and Vạn Mễ, but he was later ambushed and killed by the Sơn Lão barbarians. Although not explicitly stated, it can be inferred from the chronicle from Đại Việt sử ký toàn thư and Đại Việt sử lược that Ngô Lý Tín was appointed Grand Tutor as the replacement for Vương Nhân Từ, after the latter was killed in action in 1184. By July 1185, a force of 12,000 troops from the national army, led by the Duke of Kiến Ninh, Long Ích, had successfully defeated the Sơn Lão barbarians.

In 1188, Grand Preceptor Đỗ An Thuận died. Emperor Cao Tông subsequently appointed Ngô Lý Tín as regent, since the emperor is still a child at this time. From that time onward, Ngô Lý Tín officially took part in the civil affairs of the state. In 1189, a sex scandal erupted at the royal court involving an official named Mạc Hiển Tích, who was accused of committing adultery with Empress Dowager Đỗ Thụy Châu. Regent Ngô Lý Tín, along with bureau director Lê Năng Trường, was drawn into adjudicating the scandal. However, neither of them pursued the investigation in depth, reportedly out of fear of Mạc Hiển Tích. As a result, people throughout the country ridiculed both Ngô Lý Tín and Lê Năng Trường for their inaction. The year 1189 also marked the beginning of an impending crisis during Emperor Cao Tông’s reign, as the emperor neglected court affairs to travel throughout the realm and ordered civilians to construct temples and palaces at sites where deities were reportedly present.

== Death ==
Đại Việt sử ký toàn thư and Đại Việt sử lược briefly stated that Ngô Lý Tín died in July 1190. According to historical records preserved at Gắm Temple, he traveled by boat to Cẩm Khê village to visit his native place and encountered a storm on the Quán Trang River, a tributary of the Văn Úc River. None of the people on the boat survived. The local population mourned his death and buried him at the site where he had previously established his school, beside the Văn Úc River. Gắm Temple was constructed later that same year, with his mausoleum located behind the temple. Historical records at Gắm Temple also claimed that Lý Cao Tông mourned for the death of Ngô Lý Tín then donated 300 quan (貫, strings of cash) for the construction of that temple, and posthumously granted the title of "Thượng Đẳng Phúc Thần" (High-ranking court official and trusted confidant). The imperial edict for that title was still stored in the temple. The emperor also exempted taxes for 3 years for the village of Cẩm Khê. However, claims that Emperor Cao Tông granted a three-year tax exemption to any village might be implausible. That was because the emperor as well as the officials of his reign began exploiting the populace from that time.

After the death of Ngô Lý Tín, Lý Cao Tông’s reign entered a period of crisis due to widespread uprising, legal disorder, corruption, natural disasters and famine. The now-grown-up emperor turned out to be a hedonistic tyrant who indulged in pleasure and compelled the population to engage in the endless construction of lavish temples and palaces. From this point onward, the Lý dynasty under Emperor Lý Cao Tông entered an irreversible crisis and ultimately gave way to the Trần clan, leading to the establishment of the Trần dynasty.

There are no historical records indicating whether Ngô Lý Tín married or had children. The worship practices at Gắm Temple likewise make no mention of a spouse or descendants who succeeded him in his political career during the Lý dynasty. Due to the hereditary succession tradition (tập ấm, 襲蔭) at this time, if Ngô Lý Tín had sons, they could have been appointed in the royal court to success their father. However, there are no historical records from the reign of Lý Cao Tông, Lý Huệ Tông and Lý Chiêu Hoàng mention any officials who were descendants of Ngô Lý Tín.
