= Jedousov =

- Municipality
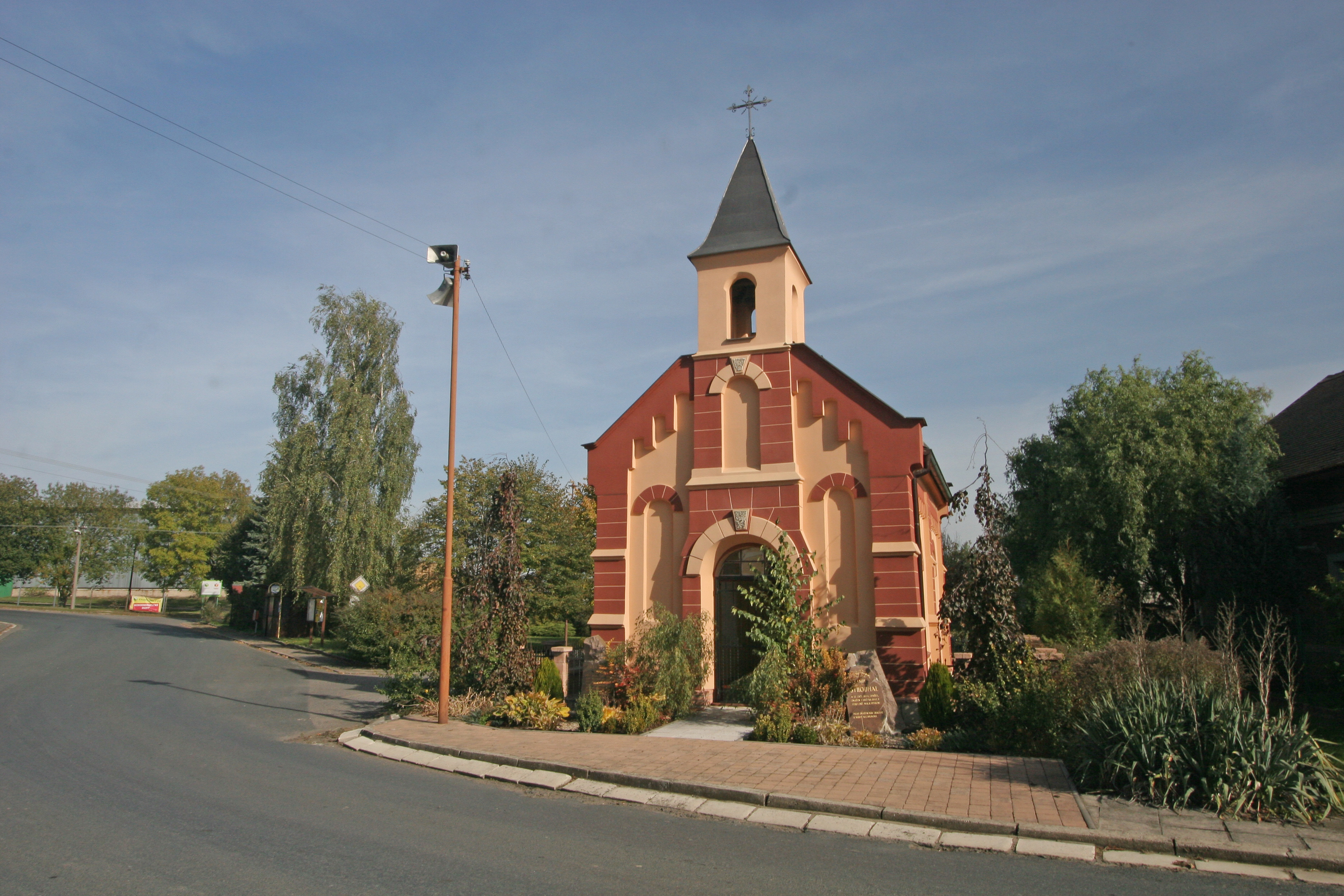
- Chapel of the Virgin Mary

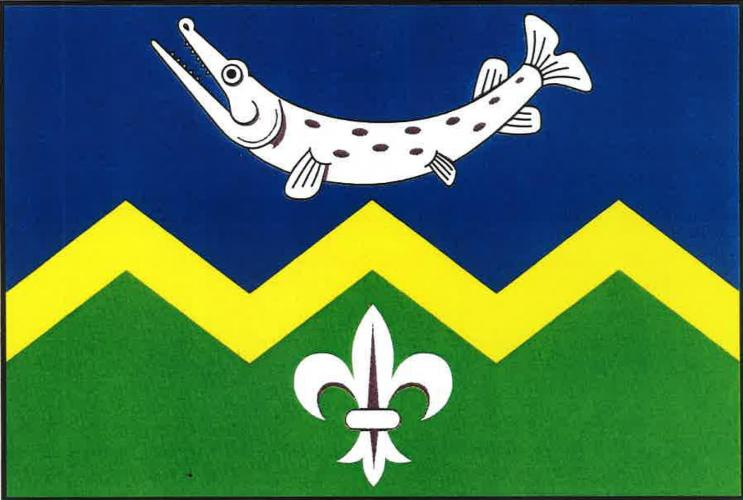
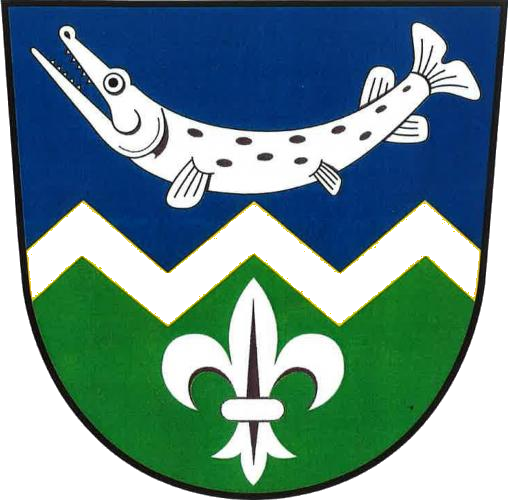
- Flag Coat of arms

- Location in the Czech Republic
- Coordinates: 49°59′43″N 15°36′37″E
- Country: Czech Republic
- Region: Pardubice
- District: Pardubice
- First mentioned: 1545

Area
  - Total: 3.41 km^{2} (1.32 sq mi)
- Elevation: 255 m (837 ft)

Population (2026-01-01)
  - Total: 171
  - Density: 50.1/km^{2} (130/sq mi)
- Time zone: UTC+1 (CET)
  - Summer (DST): UTC+2 (CEST)
- Postal code: 535 01
- Website: www.jedousov.cz

Jedousov is a municipality and village in Pardubice District in the Pardubice Region of the Czech Republic. It has about 200 inhabitants.

== Administrative division ==
Jedousov consists of two municipal parts (in brackets population according to the 2021 census):

- Jedousov (136)
- Loděnice (27)

== Demographics ==
Historical population
Year	Pop.	±%
1869	358	—
1880	409	+14.2%
1890	387	−5.4%
1900	424	+9.6%
1910	481	+13.4%
1921	467	−2.9%
1930	408	−12.6%
1950	287	−29.7%
1961	274	−4.5%
1970	211	−23.0%
1980	186	−11.8%
1991	142	−23.7%
2001	145	+2.1%
2011	135	−6.9%
2021	163	+20.7%
Source: Censuses
