= Diepold III of Vohburg =

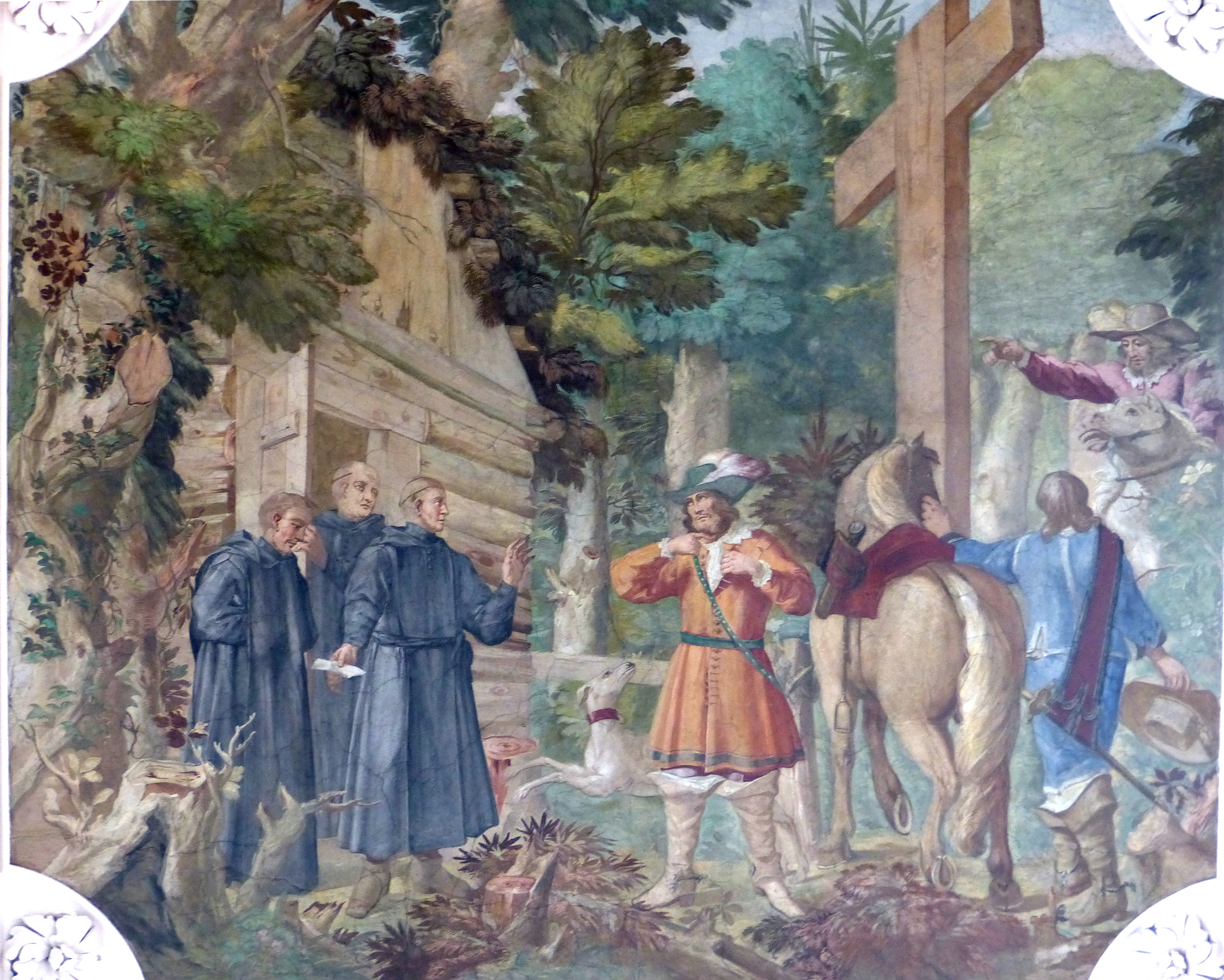
Margrave Diepold III of Vohburg-Cham meets his former friend Gerwig as hermit in the woods. Fresco in 1698, in the Waldsassen Abbey

Diepold III, Margrave of Vohburg (c. 1079 – 1146) was a Bavarian noble from the House of the Diepoldinger-Rapotonen. He was an influential follower of Emperor Henry V and is best known as the father-in-law of Emperor Frederick Barbarossa.

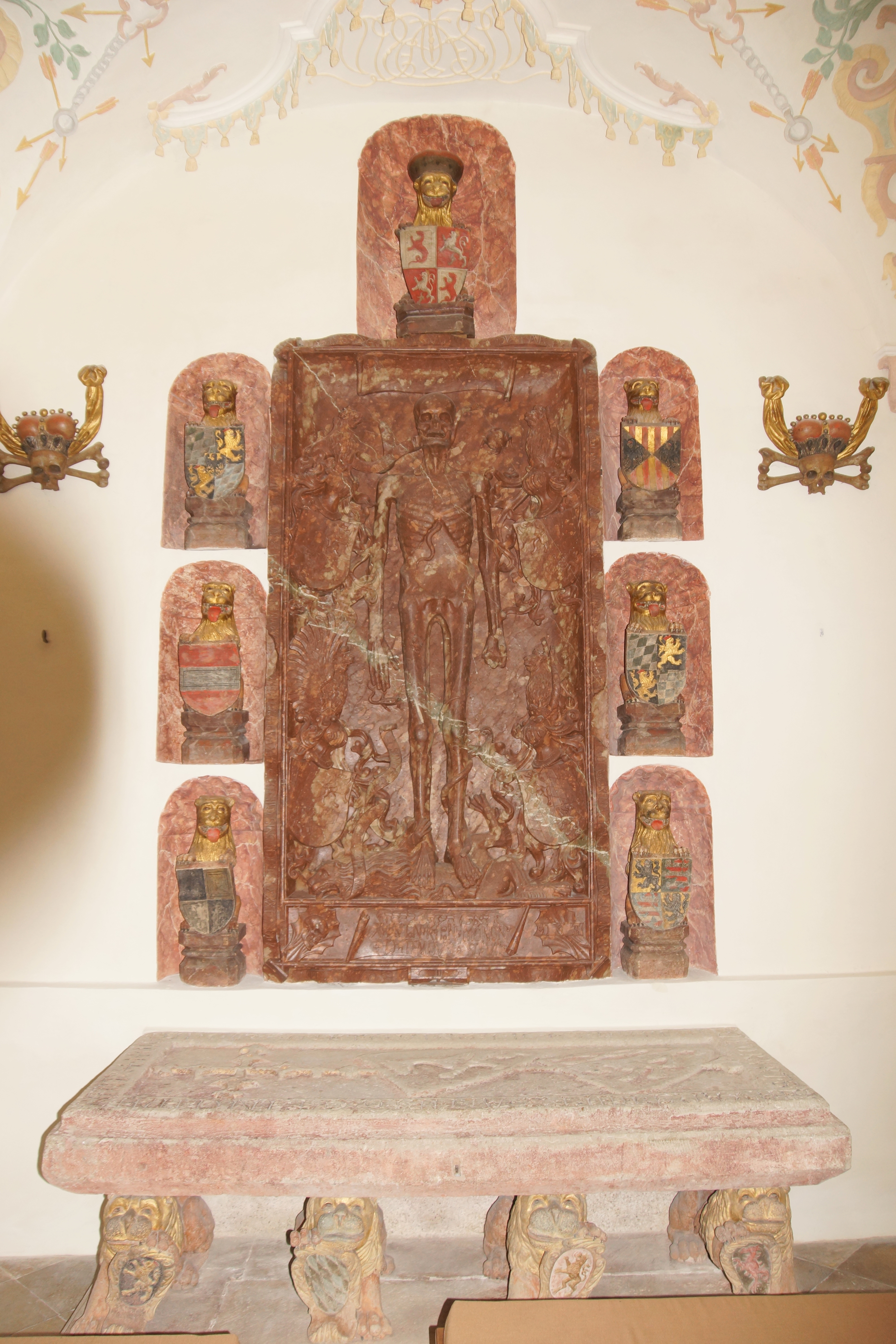
In the foreground his tombstone in the Reichenbach monastery church

He was Margrave of the Nordgau, of Nabburg, Vohburg and Cham. His father was Diepold II, his grandfather Diepold I, margraves of Cham and Vohburg. In 1099 Diepold III took over the rich inheritance of his two relatives, Burgrave Ulrich von Passau and Rapoto V von Cham. Both had died of an epidemic at Easter 1099 at an Imperial Diet in Regensburg. The scattered inheritance included the Margraviates of Cham and Vohburg as well as possessions in the Chiemgau, in Swabia and in Lower Austria. However, he did not inherit the title Count Palatine of Bavaria which Rapoto V had borne.

In 1119 Diepold III founded Reichenbach Abbey (where he was buried) and in 1133 Waldsassen Abbey.

He continued the land development in Egerland through forest clearing, founding of villages and the settlement of German colonists that his father had started. However, after his death in 1146, the Egerland once again became the property of the Bohemian crown.

== Marriage and children ==
With Adelaide of Poland (daughter of Władysław I Herman and Judith of Swabia) he had 5 children, among them Diepold IV who already died before him in 1130, and the daughter Adelheid of Vohburg who married Emperor Frederick I one year after her father's death.

His second wife was Kunigunde von Beichlingen (b. about 1095; d. 8 June 1140), with whom he had 3 children, including Bertold I (d. after 1182), who succeeded him, and Kunigunde von Vohburg (c. 1131 - 22 November 1184) who married Ottokar III of Styria.

His third marriage was to Sophia, the sister of a Hungarian count named Stephan (Istvan). From this marriage came two children, including Diepold V (d. after 1181).

== Sources ==
- Robinson, I. S. (2003). Henry IV of Germany 1056-1106. Cambridge University Press. ISBN 0-521-54590-0.
