= Świętosława of Poland =

Queen of Bohemia from 1085 to 1092

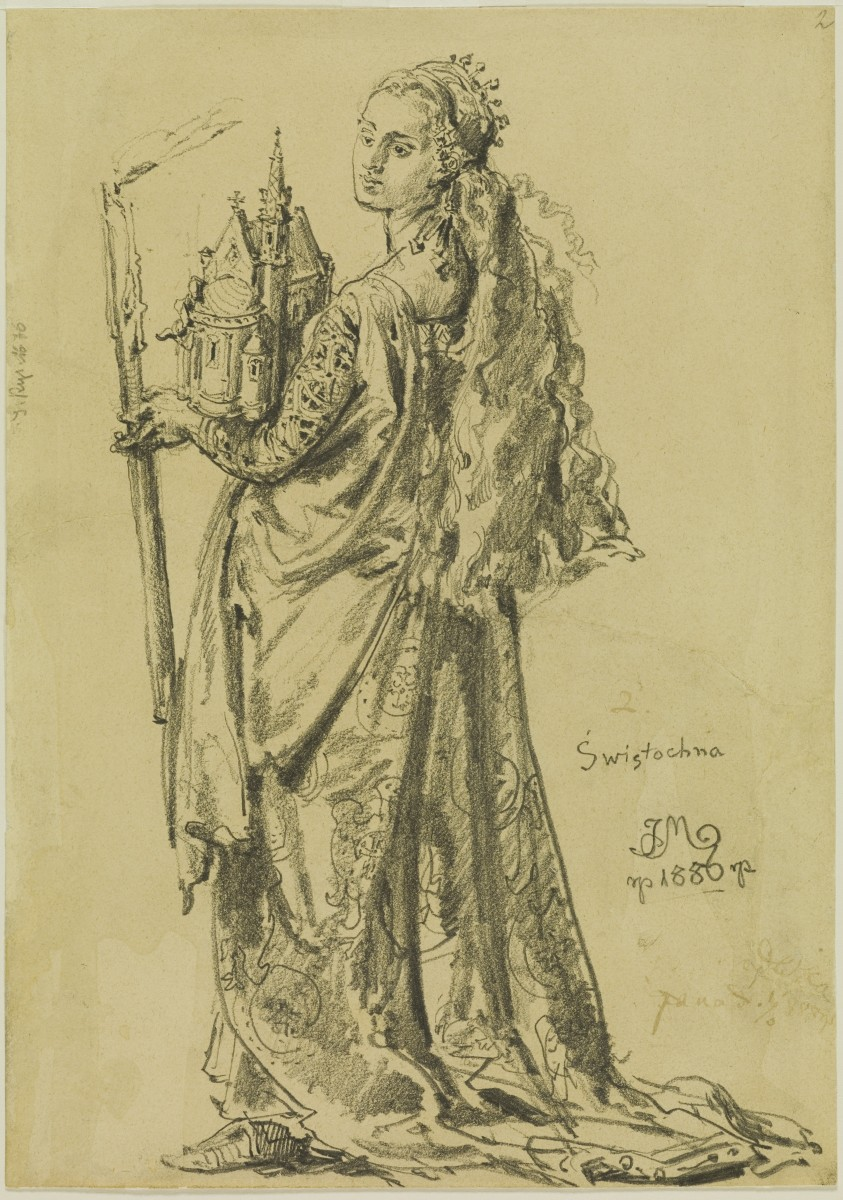
- Świętosława depicted by Jan Matejko, 1886.

Queen consort of Bohemia
- Tenure: 1062–1092
- Coronation: 15 June 1086
- Born: c. 1046–1048
- Died: 1 September 1126 (aged 78–80); Bohemia
- Spouse: Vratislaus II of Bohemia
- Issue more: Bořivoj II of Bohemia; Vladislaus I of Bohemia; Soběslav I of Bohemia
- House: Piast
- Father: Casimir I of Poland
- Mother: Maria Dobroniega of Kiev

Świętosława of Poland (Czech: Svatava Polská; c. 1046–1048 – 1 September 1126) was the third wife of Duke (later King) Vratislaus II of Bohemia and the first Queen of Bohemia as of 1085.

== Origin ==
Świętosława was the daughter of Duke Casimir I of Poland and his wife Maria Dobroniega of Kiev. She was related to the House of Přemysl, the family of her future husband, through her great-grandmother Doubravka of Bohemia. Her brothers Boleslaus II the Bold and Ladislaus I Herman were rulers of Poland.

== Marriage to Vratislaus ==
Vratislaus married Świętosława in 1062, one year after the death of the previous duchess, Vratislaus' second wife Adelaide of Hungary. His first wife Maria had died after the birth of their stillborn child. According to German historians, Świętosława was 15 years' old at the time of their marriage, while according to Oswald Balzer, she was aged 19 to 22.

With this marriage, the neutrality of Bohemia was ensured in the Polish-German conflict. In addition, Vratislaus demonstrated friendly relationships with Boleslaus II the Bold, but at a later date they disputed the Czech-Polish borders.

== The first Queen of Bohemia ==
The new duchess gave birth to four children; Vratislaus had four other ones already. The youngest son, Soběslav, was probably born in 1075. Her sons Vladislaus and Soběslav became dukes in the unquiet years after the death of their father, while her daughter Judith was married to Wiprecht, his ally and friend.

There is little information about this duchess, although she was crowned together with her husband as King and Queen in 1085 by archbishop Egilbert. They reigned for the next seven years.

== Widow ==
In 1092 Świętosława was left a widow and saw a struggle for the throne of Bohemia among the Přemyslids. In 1111, she assisted in negotiations between Vladislaus I and Bolesław III Wrymouth. After Vratislaus' death, she tried to soften clashes between their youngest sons Vladislaus and Soběslav.

In 1125, the dying Vladislaus I confirmed his relative Otto II the Black as his successor, which was also the wish of Vladislaus' wife, Richeza of Berg. Only the intervention of his mother changed his opinion, and Vladislaus reconciled with his brother Soběslav.

Świętosława, who was a widow for thirty years, lived to see the victory of her son Soběslav in the Battle of Chlumec and died in September 1126.

== Children ==
- Boleslaus (died 1091)
- Borivoj II of Bohemia (c. 1064 – 2 February 1124), Duke of Bohemia
- Vladislaus I of Bohemia (died 12 April 1125), Duke of Bohemia
- Soběslav I of Bohemia (died 14 February 1140), Duke of Bohemia
- Judith (c. 1066 – 9 December 1108), married to Wiprecht de Groitzsch

== Literature ==
- VANÍČEK, V. Vratislav II. (I.) První český král. Prague : Vyšehrad, 2004.
- KAREŠOVÁ, Z.; PRAŽÁK, J. Královny a kněžny české. Prague : X-Egem, 1996.

Świętosława of Poland Piast dynasty Born: c. 1046–1048 Died: 1 September 1126
Royal titles
Preceded by Adelaide of Hungary	Duchess consort of Bohemia; 1062–1085	Vacant Title next held by Wirpirk of Tengling
New title	Queen consort of Bohemia; 1085–1092	Vacant Title next held by Judith of Thuringia
