= Hellicha of Wittelsbach =

Duchess consort of Bohemia from 1189 to 1198

- Duchess of Bohemia
- Born: c. 1160
- Died: 13 August 1198
- Noble family: House of Wittelsbach
- Spouse: Conrad II, Duke of Bohemia
- Father: Otto VII of Wittelsbach
- Mother: Benedicta of Donauwörth

Hellicha of Wittelsbach (Czech: Hellicha z Wittelsbachu, German: Heilika von Wittelsbach; c. 1160 – 13 August 1198), was Duchess consort of Bohemia from 1189 to 1198, married to Duke Conrad II.

== Life ==
She was born in Bavaria, the daughter of Count palatine Otto VII (d. 1189), himself a son of Count Otto IV of Wittelsbach, and his wife Benedicta, daughter of Count Mangold of Donauwörth.

She and Conrad, then Duke of Znojmo, married before 1176, when she was about 16 years old and her husband was about 25 years her senior. In 1182 she became first Margravine of Moravia, when her husband was appointed margrave by Emperor Frederick Barbarossa in 1182. She became duchess when her husband, backed by both the emperor and the local nobles, ascended to the Bohemian throne in 1189.

In 1191 Duke Conrad II accompanied Frederick's son and successor Henry VI on his campaign against the Kingdom of Sicily and never returned as he died on 9 September during the siege of Naples. Hellicha died on 13 August 1198.

Hellicha of Wittelsbach House of Wittelsbach Born: c. 1160 Died: 13 August 1198
Royal titles
Preceded by Elizabeth of Hungary	Duchess consort of Bohemia; 1189–1191	Succeeded by Adelaide of Meissen
