= Reichenbach Abbey (Bavaria) =

Monastery in Reichenbach, Germany

Coordinates: 49°10′58″N 12°20′54″E

Reichenbach Abbey is a monastery of the Brothers Hospitallers, formerly a Benedictine monastery, in Reichenbach in Bavaria, Germany.

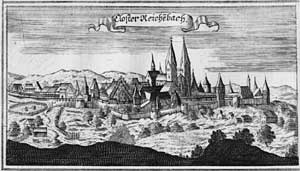
Engraving of the abbey from the "Churbaierische Atlas" of Anton Wilhelm Ertl, 1687

== History ==
The monastery, dedicated to the Assumption of the Blessed Virgin, was founded in 1118 by Markgraf Diepold III of Vohburg and his mother Luitgard. During the Reformation it was looted, and secularised from 1553 to 1669, when it was re-established. It was dissolved again in 1803 during the secularisation of Bavaria. The abbey's property was confiscated by the state and eventually auctioned off in 1820.

After a couple of unsuccessful attempts to restore it as a religious house, the site was acquired in 1890 by the Brothers Hospitallers, who established a nursing home for the mentally and physically handicapped. Today there is in addition a special school teaching therapeutic care.

== Burials ==
- Richeza of Berg
