= Manegold of Berg =

Manegold of Berg (c. 1140/1150 – 9 June 1215 in Vienna) was abbot of St. George's Abbey in the Black Forest, Kremsmünster Abbey and Tegernsee Abbey, and Bishop of Passau.

Manegold, the youngest son of Count Diepold of Berg in Upper Swabia and of Gisela of Andechs, was destined for a religious career. His older brother Otto also became a bishop. He became a monk in his youth, then abbot of the monastery of St. George's Abbey in the Black Forest, where he defended its property rights against counter-claims from Tennenbach Abbey (1180–1187). At the same time he was also put in charge of Kremsmünster Abbey in Austria, a role he held onto from 1183 to 1206, although not without opposition. He then became abbot of the Bavarian monastery of Tegernsee between 1190 and 1206, and gave up the abbacy of St. George's in 1193 or 1194.

In 1197, he took part in the Crusade to the Holy Land. He was elected Bishop of Passau in 1206, which he remained until 1215. Against the background of the pro-Hohenstaufen attitude of the Counts of Berg, Manegold was much involved in the political activities of the Holy Roman Empire and met with Emperor Henry VI (1190–1197), King Philip (1198–1208), Emperor Otto IV (1198–1215/1218) and Emperor Frederick II (1212/1215–1250). As a bishop he was interested in the territorial expansion of his bishopric, and had the city of Passau fortified in 1209. He died on 9 June 1215 in Vienna.

== Sources ==
- Franz-Reiner Erkens (1990). "Manegold von Berg". Neue Deutsche Biographie (in German). Vol. 16. Berlin: Duncker & Humblot. p. 27.
- Buhlmann, M., 2003. Manegold von Berg – Abt von St. Georgen, Bischof von Passau (= Vertex Alemanniae, H. 4). St. Georgen.
- Buhlmann, M., 2003. Die Urkunde Papst Alexanders III. für das Kloster St. Georgen (= Vertex Alemanniae, H. 5). St. Georgen.
- Buhlmann, M., 2003. Manegold von Berg – Abt von St. Georgen, Bischof von Passau: Quellen und Regesten (= Vertex Alemanniae, H. 6). St. Georgen.
