= Adelaide of Vohburg =

Queen of Germany from 1152 to 1153

Queen consort of Germany
- Tenure: 1152–1153
- Born: c. 1125
- Died: 25 May after 1187; Weissenau Abbey, Swabia
- Spouse: Frederick I of Germany; Dietho of Ravensburg
- Father: Diepold III, Margrave of Vohburg

Adelaide of Vohburg (German: Adela or Adelheid; c. 1125 – 25 May after 1187) was Duchess of Swabia from 1147 and German queen from 1152 until 1153, as the first wife of the Hohenstaufen king Frederick Barbarossa, the later Holy Roman Emperor.

== Life ==
Adelaide was a daughter of the Bavarian margrave Diepold III of Vohburg (c. 1079 – 1146), probably from his first marriage with Adelaide (Adelajda; c. 1091 – 1127), a daughter of the Polish duke Władysław I Herman and Judith of Swabia. Since the days of Emperor Henry IV, her father's ancestors ruled over the Egerland territory in the Bavarian March of the Nordgau, which, however, was seized by King Conrad III of Germany upon the margrave's death in 1146. To secure his hold on the Egerland, Conrad III married his nephew Frederick of Hohenstaufen to Diepold's daughter, Adelaide, before 2 March 1147 in the city of Eger. Frederick had just returned from the Second Crusade; he succeeded his father Frederick the One-Eyed as Duke of Swabia one month later and added his wife's extended dowry to his estates.

Adelaide and Frederick's marriage was not successful, however. According to some later sources, this was because Adelaide committed adultery. Adelaide rarely made public appearances and was not present for Frederick's election as the successor of his paternal uncle, Conrad III, on 4 March 1152, nor for his coronation as King of Germany at Aachen Cathedral five days later.

Adelaide was Frederick's queen consort, but the couple remained childless. In 1153 Frederick petitioned Pope Eugene III for an annulment. The separation was granted and confirmed by the Bishop of Constance in March 1153; the justification given on grounds of consanguinity. Frederick immediately began to court the Byzantine princess Maria Komnena, though to no avail.

No longer a queen, Adelaide, apparently unhampered by her former husband, soon after entered into a morganatic marriage with Dietho of Ravensburg, a ministerialis in the service of Duke Welf VI. The marriage produced several children. Dietho died about 1187; Adelaide died shortly afterwards at the Premonstratensian abbey of Weissenau near Ravensburg.

Adelaide of Vohburg Diepoldings Born: c. 1125 Died: 25 May after 1187
Royal titles
Preceded by Gertrude of Sulzbach	Queen consort of Germany; 1152–1153	Succeeded by Beatrice I of Burgundy
