= Loděnice (Brno-Country District) =

- Municipality
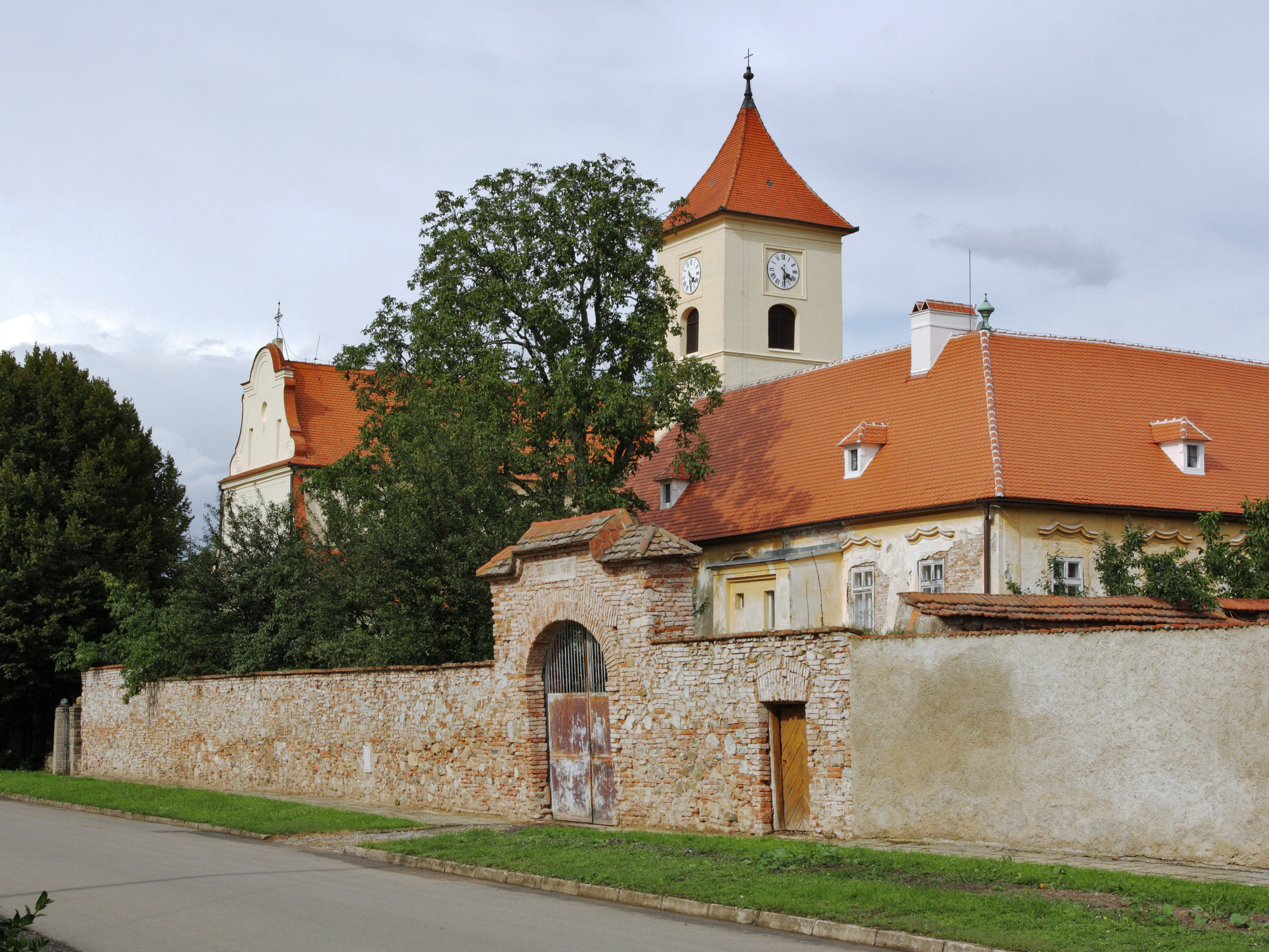
- Rectory and Church of Saint Margaret the Virgin

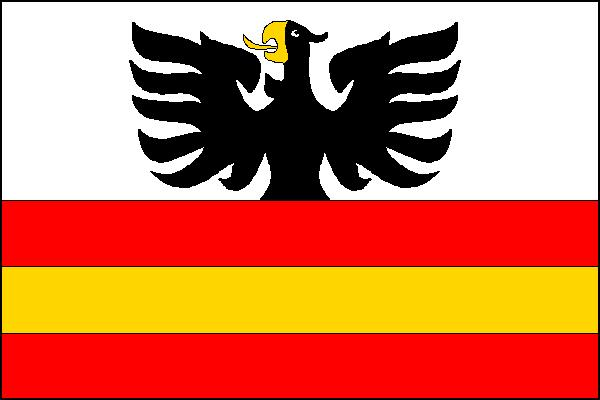
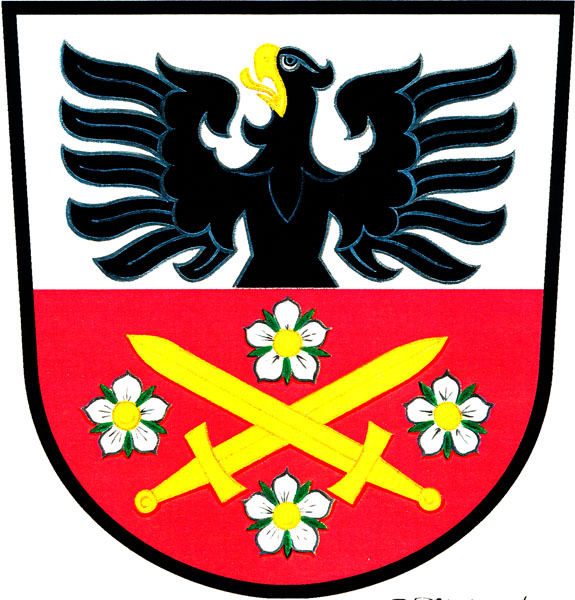
- Flag Coat of arms

- Location in the Czech Republic
- Coordinates: 49°0′42″N 16°27′47″E
- Country: Czech Republic
- Region: South Moravian
- District: Brno-Country
- First mentioned: 1185

Area
  - Total: 8.67 km^{2} (3.35 sq mi)
- Elevation: 200 m (660 ft)

Population (2026-01-01)
  - Total: 635
  - Density: 73.2/km^{2} (190/sq mi)
- Time zone: UTC+1 (CET)
  - Summer (DST): UTC+2 (CEST)
- Postal code: 671 75
- Website: www.obec-lodenice.cz

Loděnice is a municipality and village in Brno-Country District in the South Moravian Region of the Czech Republic. It has about 600 inhabitants.

Loděnice lies approximately 24 kilometres (15 mi) south-west of Brno and 190 km (120 mi) south-east of Prague.

== Demographics ==
Historical population
Year	Pop.	±%
1869	593	—
1880	704	+18.7%
1890	661	−6.1%
1900	752	+13.8%
1910	831	+10.5%
1921	841	+1.2%
1930	854	+1.5%
1950	586	−31.4%
1961	611	+4.3%
1970	571	−6.5%
1980	499	−12.6%
1991	478	−4.2%
2001	473	−1.0%
2011	461	−2.5%
2021	549	+19.1%
Source: Censuses
