= Heinrich von Berg =

Heinrich von Berg (died 14 April 1197 in Würzburg) was Bishop of Passau from 1169 to 1171 and Bishop of Würzburg from 1191 to 1197.

== Early life ==
Heinrich von Berg comes from the Swabian counts of Berg. His parents were Diepold II von Berg-Schelklingen and Gisela von Dießen-Andechs. His younger brothers were Diepold von Berg and Manegold von Berg, both later also Bishop of Passau. The Freisinger Bishop Otto II von Berg was also his brother. Count Berthold I. von Henneberg is considered a nephew. An uncle was Bishop Otto II of Bamberg.

According to the count of the bishop's orders, Count Heinrich is a Passau bishop, Heinrich I, and a Bishop Heinrich III of Wurzburg.

== Career as Bishop of Passau ==
Heinrich began his spiritual career as the canon of Speyer Cathedral and was elected by Frederick Barbarossa in the election as bishop of Passau, against the candidate of Pope Alexander III Albo preferred, but had to leave shortly afterwards in 1171 and followed his younger brother Diepold. Heinrich went back to Speyer and rose to the Dompropst in 1176 and took over this post in 1180 also in Bamberg.

== Career as Bishop of Wurzburg ==
In Reichpolitik he appeared in 1193 when the Emperor was a guest in Wurzburg, and on 14 February he negotiated a treaty with the Duke Leopold of Austria on the extradition of the English King Richard the Lion Heart, who had been imprisoned on his return from the Third Crusade.
