= Diepold of Berg =

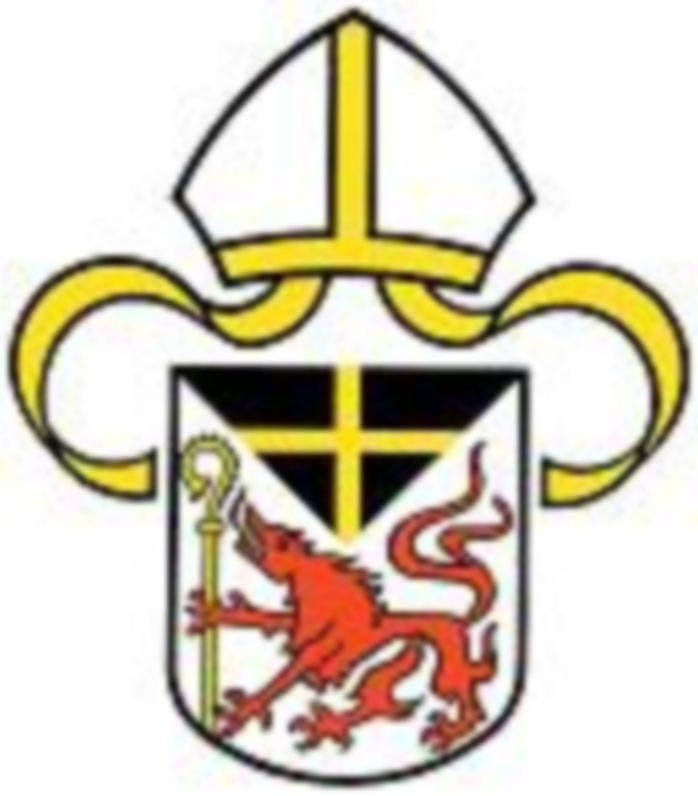
Bistumswappen of Passau.

Diepold Count von Berg, also: Theobald, (c. 1140, – 3 November 1190) was the 11th Bishop of Passau from 1172 to 1190.

== Biography ==
Diepold von Berg was born around 1140 as the son of Diepold von Berg-Schelklingen and Gisela von Andechs. Both his older brother Heinrich and the younger Manegold played an important role in the history of the Diocese of Passau. His third brother, Otto II von Berg, was Bishop of Freising.

Diepold was ordained priest on 10 June 1172 by Bishop Henry I of Gurk. On 23 November of the year, he was, at the urging of the Emperor Frederick Barbarossa (present at the ceremony), and with the consent of Pope Alexander III. New bishop of Passau. He thus succeeded the succession of his brother Heinrich von Berg.

In 1178 he took part in the provincial synod in Hohenau at the Inn and traveled to Rome in 1179 to the third Lateran Council. Back at Passau he had been confronted to the fire of the city in 1181, Diepold energetically sought the reconstruction of the cathedral and the residence.

In 1189, he accompanied Emperor Friedrich Barbarossa to the unsuccessful Third Crusade, and finally died in November 1190, together with six canons of the Passau Cathedral, during the siege of Acre in the camp near the city. Diepold was buried in the Holy Land.
