= Wenceslaus II, Duke of Bohemia =

Duke of Bohemia in 1191

Wenceslaus II

Duke of Bohemia
- Reign: September – December 1191
- Predecessor: Conrad II
- Successor: Ottokar I
- Born: 1137
- Died: c. 1192 (aged c. 55); Margravate of Meissen
- Dynasty: Přemyslid
- Father: Soběslav I

Wenceslaus II (Czech: Václav II.) (1137 – after 1192) was the son of Soběslav I and brother of Soběslav II. He was the duke of Bohemia following Conrad II in 1191.

== Life ==
He was the duke of Olomouc and Brno, but was deposed by Duke Frederick in 1179 and exiled. He returned from exile after thirteen years on Conrad's death.

Wenceslaus was deposed after a reign of three months by Frederick's half-brother Ottokar. He tried to flee to the Emperor Henry VI, but was captured by the margrave of Lusatia, who imprisoned him until his death.

Preceded by Conrad II	Duke of Bohemia; 1191–1192	Succeeded by Ottokar I
