= Soběslav II of Bohemia =

Duke of Bohemia from 1173 to 1178

Soběslav II
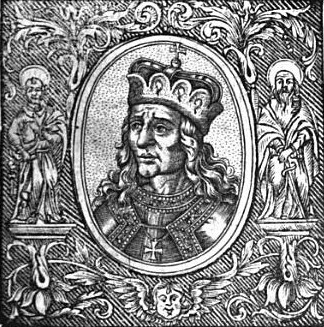

Duke of Bohemia
- Reign: 1173–1178
- Predecessor: Frederick
- Successor: Frederick
- Born: c. 1128
- Died: 29 January 1180 (aged 51 or 52)
- Burial: Vyšehrad
- Spouse: Elisabeth of Greater Poland
- Dynasty: Přemyslid
- Father: Soběslav I
- Mother: Adelaide of Hungary

Soběslav II (also Sobeslaus II), called Prince of the Peasants or King of the Peasants (c. 1128 – 29 January 1180), was the Duke of Bohemia from 1173 to 1178. He was the second son of Soběslav I. Supported by neither nobles nor emperor, he was backed solely by the lowest classes.

== Life ==
In 1172, Frederick, son of Vladislaus II, succeeded his abdicating father. Frederick Barbarossa, the Holy Roman Emperor, held a Diet at Hermsdorf in September 1173 and deposed Frederick, nominating Oldřich, son of Soběslav I. Oldřich immediately abdicated in favour of his elder brother Soběslav II, who had been imprisoned since 1161.

Soběslav granted a charter to the town of Prague, but he entered into a fight with Henry II, Duke of Austria, in 1175. In summer 1176, Soběslav and Conrad Otto of Znojmo devastated the country to the north of the Danube. Churches and monasteries were attacked and Pope Alexander III excommunicated the duke. Barbarossa intervened in 1177 and recognised Frederick as duke. By 1179, Soběslav was removed and he died in "some part of a foreign land" on 29 January 1180 without heirs from his union with Elisabeth (d.1209), daughter of Mieszko III of Poland.

Preceded by Frederick	Duke of Bohemia; 1173–1178	Succeeded by Frederick
