= Vladislaus I, Duke of Bohemia =

c. 1065 – 1125; Duke of Bohemia 1109–1117 and 1120–1125

Vladislaus I
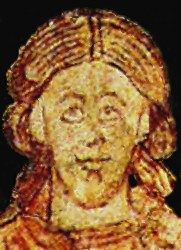

Duke of Bohemia
- Reign: 1109–1117
- Predecessor: Svatopluk
- Successor: Bořivoj II

Duke of Bohemia
- Reign: 1120–1125
- Predecessor: Bořivoj II
- Successor: Sobeslav I
- Born: c. 1065
- Died: 12 April 1125 (aged 59–60)
- Spouse: Richeza of Berg
- Issue among others...: Vladislav II of Bohemia; Děpold I of Jamnitz
- House: Přemyslid dynasty
- Father: Vratislaus II of Bohemia
- Mother: Świętosława of Poland

Vladislaus I (Czech: Vladislav I.; c. 1065 – 12 April 1125) was Duke of Bohemia from 1109 to 1117 and from 1120 until his death.

== Life ==
Vladislav I was a son of Vratislaus II of Bohemia by his second wife Svatava, a daughter of Casimir I of Poland. Together with his cousin Svatopluk, Vladislav expelled his brother Bořivoj II from Bohemia in 1107. In 1109, Svatopluk was killed during a campaign in Poland, and Vladislav I succeeded him as Duke of Bohemia. Bořivoj II returned from exile with the support of Prince Bolesław III Wrymouth of Poland, but was defeated and imprisoned by Vladislav in 1110.

In spite of his victory, Vladislav I remained under Polish pressure and was forced to recognize a younger brother, Soběslav, as subordinate ruler of Moravia in Znojmo. In 1117, Vladislav I formally abdicated in favor of Bořivoj II, but retained much of the actual power. In 1120, Bořivoj was deposed again and endowed with Znojmo, while Vladislav resumed the throne, which he held until his death in 1125.

Vladislav I ruled in a difficult time with considerable success. Although he continued to acknowledge the suzerainty of the Holy Roman Empire, he weathered the interventions of Poland into Bohemian affairs, conflicts with his kinsmen in Moravia, and undertook offensive campaigns against both Poland and Austria. In 1110–11, Vladislav accompanied Emperor Henry V on his Italian expedition, and he encouraged continued German settlement into Bohemia's border regions.

== Kladruby Monastery ==
In 1115, the Benedictine monastery of Kladruby was established, with Vladislav endowing the abbey with 25 manors and the lordship of Zbraslav. Although by 1117, he had enlarged the abbey with six monks and six lay brethren.

== Family ==
By his wife Richeza of Berg (died 27 September 1125), daughter of Count Henry I of Berg. They had:

- Svatava
- Vladislav II of Bohemia (c. 1110 – 18 January 1174), King of Bohemia
- Děpold I of Jamnitz (died August 1167)
- Jindřich (Henry) (d. after 1169), married to Margaret. His son Bretislav became bishop of Prague and later duke of Bohemia as Bretislav III.

== See also ==
- Battle of Olšava

== Sources ==
- Berend, Nora; Urbanczyk, Przemyslaw; Wiszewski, Przemyslaw (2013). Central Europe in the High Middle Ages:Bohemia, Hungary and Poland, c.900–c.1300. Cambridge University Press.
- Davies, Norman (1982). God's Playground: A History of Poland. Vol. I: The Origins to 1795. Columbia University Press.
- Knoll, Paul W.; Schaer, Frank, eds. (2003). Gesta principum Polonorum: The Deeds of the Princes of the Poles. Central European University Press.
- Slepička, Martin (2025). "On the life and reign of Vladislaus I, Duke of Bohemia". In Slepička, Martin; Morávková, Naděžda (eds.). Český kníže Vladislav I., západní Čechy a český stát za vlády Přemyslovců: k 900. výročí úmrtí zakladatele kladrubského kláštera Vladislava I. Západočeská univerzita v Plzni. pp. 66–122. ISBN 978-80-261-1343-0.
- Thompson, James Westfall (1926). "Medieval German Expansion in Bohemia". The Slavonic Review. 4, No. 12 March.
- Wihoda, Martin (2015). Vladislaus Henry: The Formation of Moravian Identity. Brill.
- Wiszewski, Przemyslaw (2010). Domus Bolezlai: Values and social identity in dynastic traditions of medieval Poland (c. 966–1138). Brill.

Vladislaus I, Duke of Bohemia Přemyslid Born: 1065 Died: 12 April 1125
Preceded by Svatopluk	Duke of Bohemia; 1109–1117	Succeeded by Bořivoj II
Preceded by Bořivoj II	Duke of Bohemia; 1120–1125	Succeeded by Soběslav I
